= List of fantasy authors =

This is a list of fantasy authors, authors known for writing works of fantasy, fantasy literature, or related genres of magic realism, horror fiction, science fantasy. Many of the authors are known for work outside the fantasy genres.

== A ==
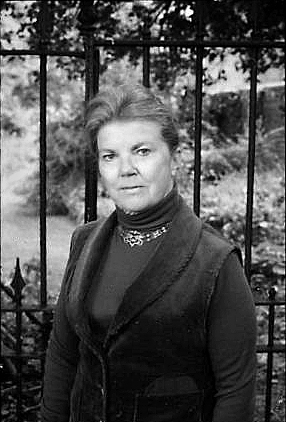
Joan Aiken

- Ben Aaronovitch (born 1964), author of Peter Grant (book series)
- Rafael Ábalos (born 1956) is author of Grimpow
- Lynn Abbey (born 1948)
- Joe Abercrombie (born 1974), author of The First Law series
- Daniel Abraham (born 1969), author of The Dagger and the Coin series
- Douglas Adams (1952–2001), author of The Hitchhiker's Guide to the Galaxy series
- Richard Adams (1920–2016), author of Watership Down
- Katherine Addison, pen name for Sarah Monette, author of The Goblin Emperor
- Tomi Adeyemi (born 1993), author of the Legacy of Orïsha trilogy
- Alexandra Adornetto (born 1992), author of The Strangest Adventures series
- Joan Aiken (1924–2004), author of The Wolves of Willoughby Chase
- Tim Akers (born 1972)
- Wendy Alec, author of the Chronicles of Brothers series
- Lloyd Alexander (1924–2007), author of The Chronicles of Prydain
- Alan Burt Akers, pseudonym of Kenneth Bulmer (1921–2005)
- Hans Christian Andersen (1805–1875), authored fairy tales, including The Little Mermaid
- Poul Anderson (1926–2001), author of The Broken Sword
- Ilona Andrews, husband and wife writing team, author of the Kate Daniels series and The Edge series
- F. Anstey (1856–1934), author of Vice Versa
- Piers Anthony (born 1934), author of Xanth
- Katherine Applegate (born 1956), author of Everworld
- Katherine Arden (born 1987), author of the Winternight trilogy
- Tom Arden (1961–2015)
- Kelley Armstrong (born 1968), author of the Women of the Otherworld
- Jennifer L. Armentrout (born 1980), author of From Blood and Ash
- Danilo Arona (born 1950)
- Catherine Asaro (born 1955)
- Mike Ashley (born 1948)
- Nancy Asire (1945–2021)
- Robert Asprin (1946–2008), author of the MythAdventures and contributing author to Thieves' World
- Tomi Adeyemi (born 1993), author of Children of Blood and Bone
- A. A. Attanasio (born 1951), author of Radix
- Amelia Atwater-Rhodes (born 1984), author of In the Forests of the Night
- Anselm Audley (born 1982), author of the Aquasilva series
- Jean M. Auel, author of the Earth's Children books
- Fiona Avery (born 1974)
- Victoria Aveyard (born 1990), author of the Red Queen series

== B ==
Peter S. Beagle

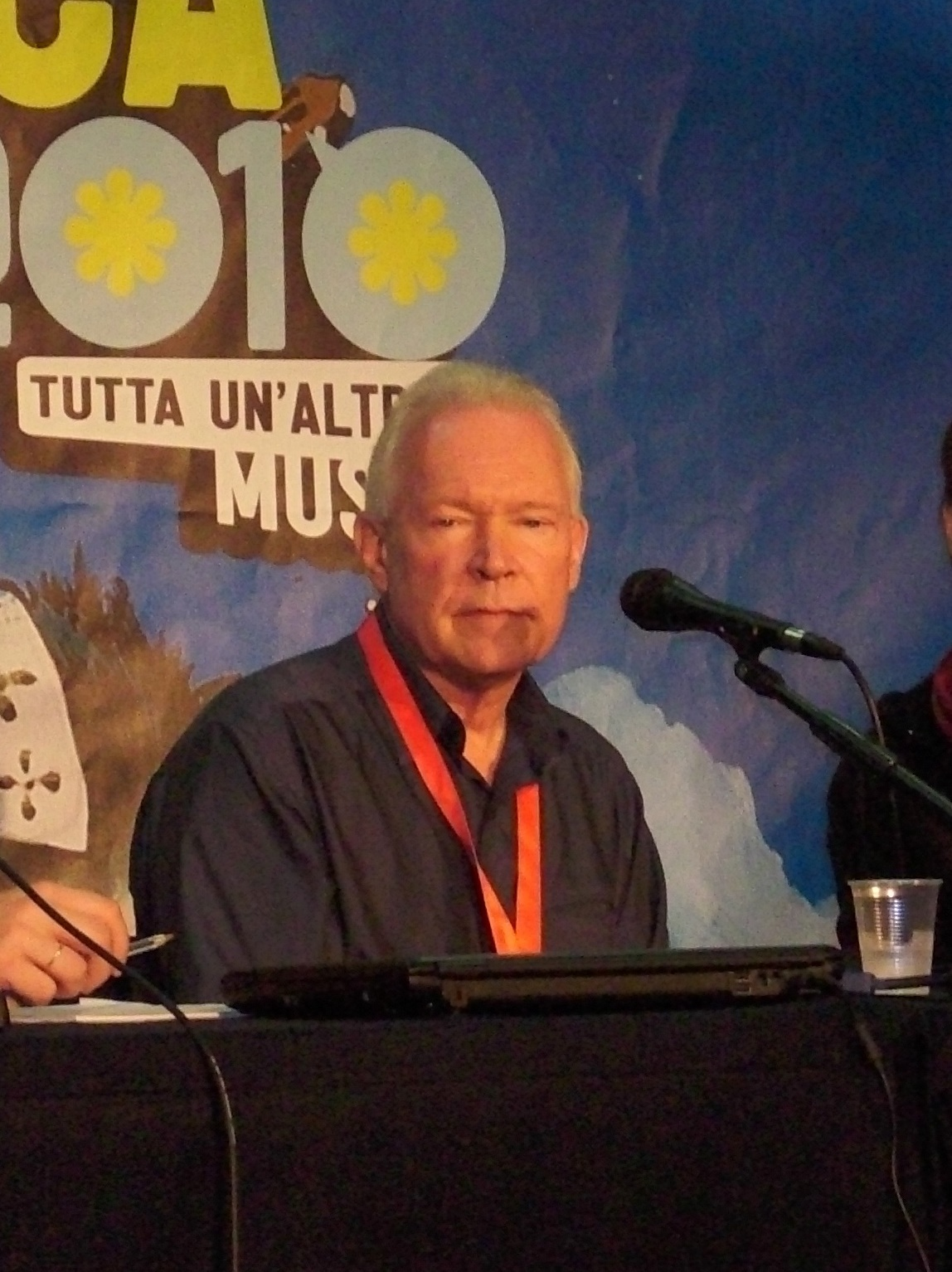
Terry Brooks

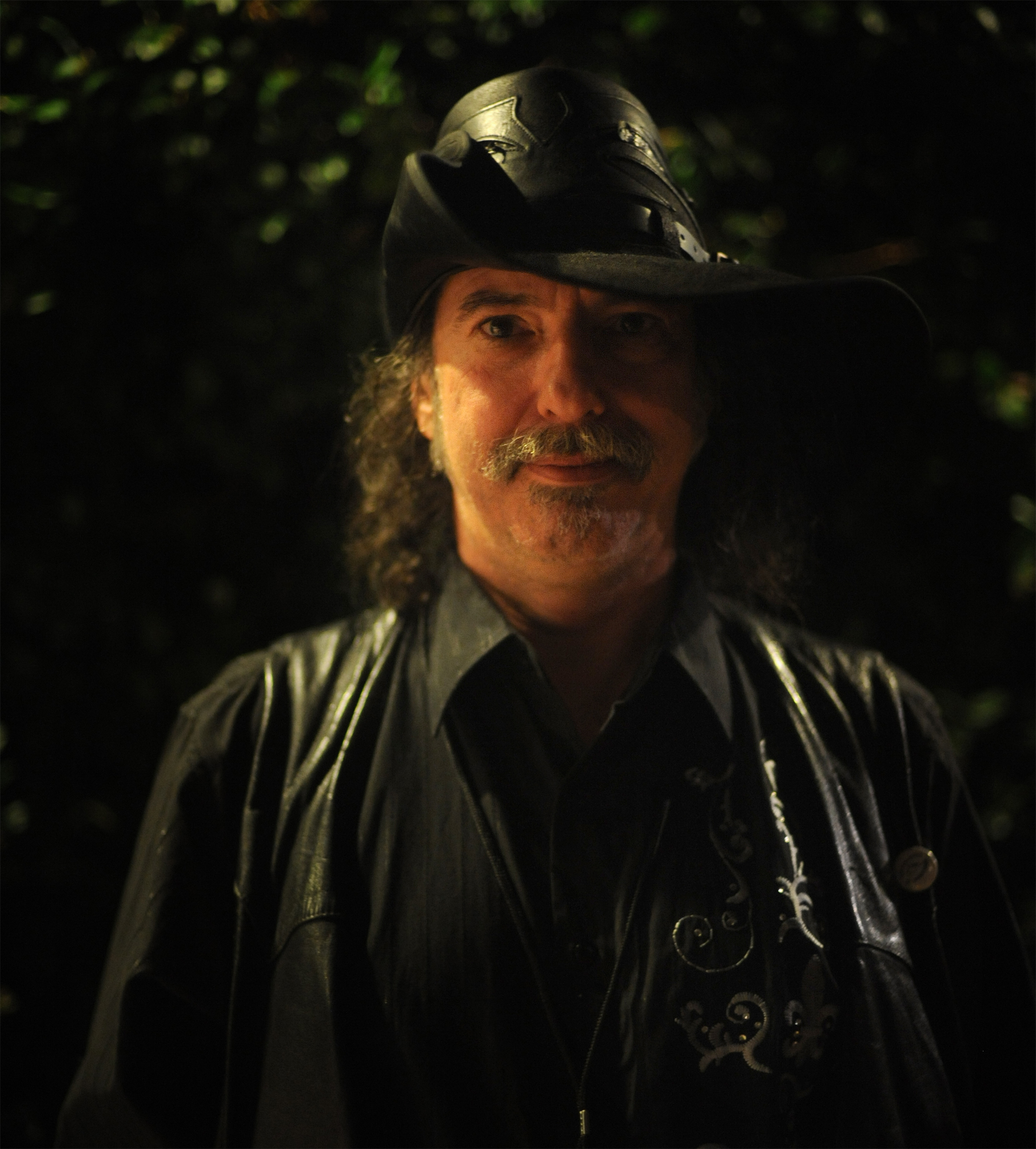
Steven Brust

- Robin Wayne Bailey (born 1952), author of the Frost trilogy, Brothers of the Dragon trilogy, Dragonkin trilogy, Shadowdance, etc.
- Keith Baker (born 1969) freelance author of Dungeons & Dragons
- R. Scott Bakker (born 1967), author of the Prince of Nothing series
- Josiah Bancroft, author of Senlin Ascends
- Catherine Banner (born 1989), author of The Last Descendants series
- Ivan Baran (born 1996), author of The Black Books Cycle
- James Barclay (born 1965), author of Chronicles of the Raven and Legends of the Raven, both trilogies
- Leigh Bardugo, author of Six of Crows
- Clive Barker (born 1952), author of The Books of Abarat series
- M. A. R. Barker (1929–2012), author of the Tékumel series
- William Barnwell (born 1943), author of the Blessing Papers series
- J. M. Barrie (1860–1937), author of Peter Pan
- T. A. Barron (born 1952), author of Merlin Effect and The Lost Years of Merlin
- Samit Basu (born 1979), author of The Simoqin Prophecies and The Manticore's Secret
- Gael Baudino (born 1955), author of Dragonsword and Duel of Dragons
- L. Frank Baum (1856–1919), author of the Land of Oz series
- Peter S. Beagle (born 1939), author of The Last Unicorn and A Fine and Private Place
- Elizabeth Bear (born 1971), author of Hammered
- Bradley Beaulieu, author of The Lays of Anuskaya and The Song of the Shattered Sands series
- Frank Beddor (born 1958), author of The Looking Glass Wars
- John Bellairs (1938–1991), author of The Face in the Frost and The House with a Clock in Its Walls
- Hans Bemmann (1922–2003), author of The Stone and the Flute and Erwins Badezimmer
- Robert Jackson Bennett (born 1984), author of The Divine Cities series
- Stella Benson (1892–1933), author of Living Alone
- Carol Berg (born 1948)
- Ari Berk (born 1967), author of the Undertaken Trilogy
- Steve Berman, editor in the field of queer speculative fiction
- Julie Bertagna (born 1962), author of the Spark Gap series
- Anne Bishop, author of the Black Jewels Trilogy
- Holly Black (born 1971) co-author of (with Tony DiTerlizzi) The Spiderwick Chronicles
- Algernon Blackwood (1869–1951), author of "The Willows", "The Wendigo" and The Centaur
- James Blaylock (born 1950)
- Enid Blyton (1897–1968), author of The Enchanted Wood and The Magic Faraway Tree
- Aliette de Bodard (born 1982), author of Obsidian and Blood series
- Maya Kaathryn Bohnhoff (born 1954), author of The Meri
- Pseudonymous Bosch (born 1967), author of The Secret Series of books
- Hannes Bok (1914–1964) illustrator and author of The Sorcerer's Ship
- Natasha Bowen, author of Skin of the Sea
- Paula Brackston, author of The Witch's Daughter
- Ray Bradbury (1920–2012), author of Fahrenheit 451 and Something Wicked This Way Comes
- Marion Zimmer Bradley (1930–1999), author of the Darkover series and editor of the Sword and Sorceress series of anthologies
- Rebecca Bradley, author of The Lady in Gil
- Gillian Bradshaw (born 1956), author of Hawk of May (also writes historical fiction and science fiction novels)
- Ernest Bramah (1868–1942), author of the Kai Lung stories
- Libba Bray (born 1964), author of the Gemma Doyle Trilogy
- Marie Brennan, author of Doppelganger
- Peter V. Brett (born 1973), author of The Painted Man and The Desert Spear
- Rae Bridgman, author/illustrator of The MiddleGate Books - The Serpent's Spell, Amber Ambrosia, Fish & Sphinx
- Patricia Briggs (born 1965), author of Moon Called and sequels
- Kristen Britain, author of the Green Rider novels
- C. Dale Brittain (born 1948), author of the Yurt novels
- Maurice Broaddus, author of The Knights of Breton Court trilogy
- Terry Brooks (born 1944), author of the Shannara novels, Magic Kingdom of Landover novels and Word & Void series
- Roseanne A. Brown (born 1995), author of A Song of Wraiths and Ruin
- Howard Browne (1908–1999)
- Steven Brust (born 1955), author of the Dragaera novels
- Col Buchanan (born 1973), author of Farlander and Stands a Shadow
- Michael Buckley (born 1969), author of The Sisters Grimm series
- Lela E. Buis
- Lois McMaster Bujold (born 1949), author of The Curse of Chalion and its sequels
- Emma Bull (born 1954), author of War for the Oaks
- Kenneth Bulmer (1921–2005), author of the Dray Prescot series
- Chris Bunch (1943–2005), author of Dragon Master Trilogy
- Arthur J. Burks (1898–1974)
- Edgar Rice Burroughs (1875–1950), author of the Tarzan, Barsoom, Pellucidar and Amtor novels
- Jim Butcher (born 1971), author of Dresden Files and Codex Alera novels

== C ==
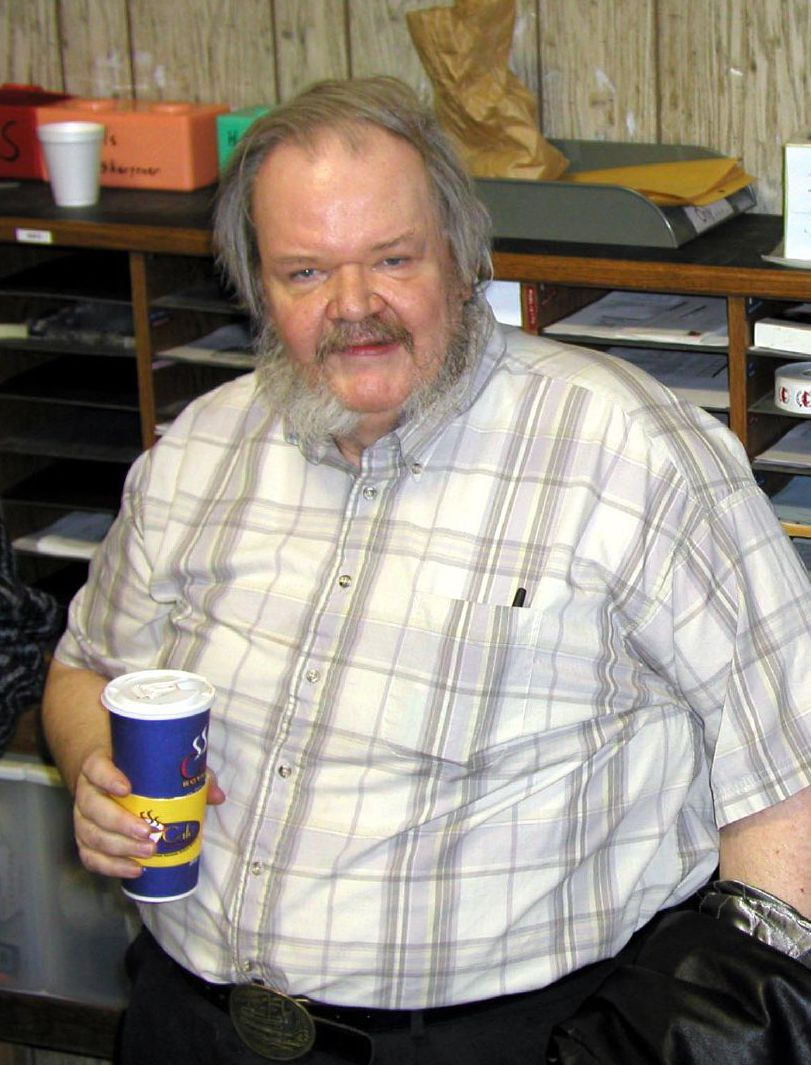
Jack L. Chalker

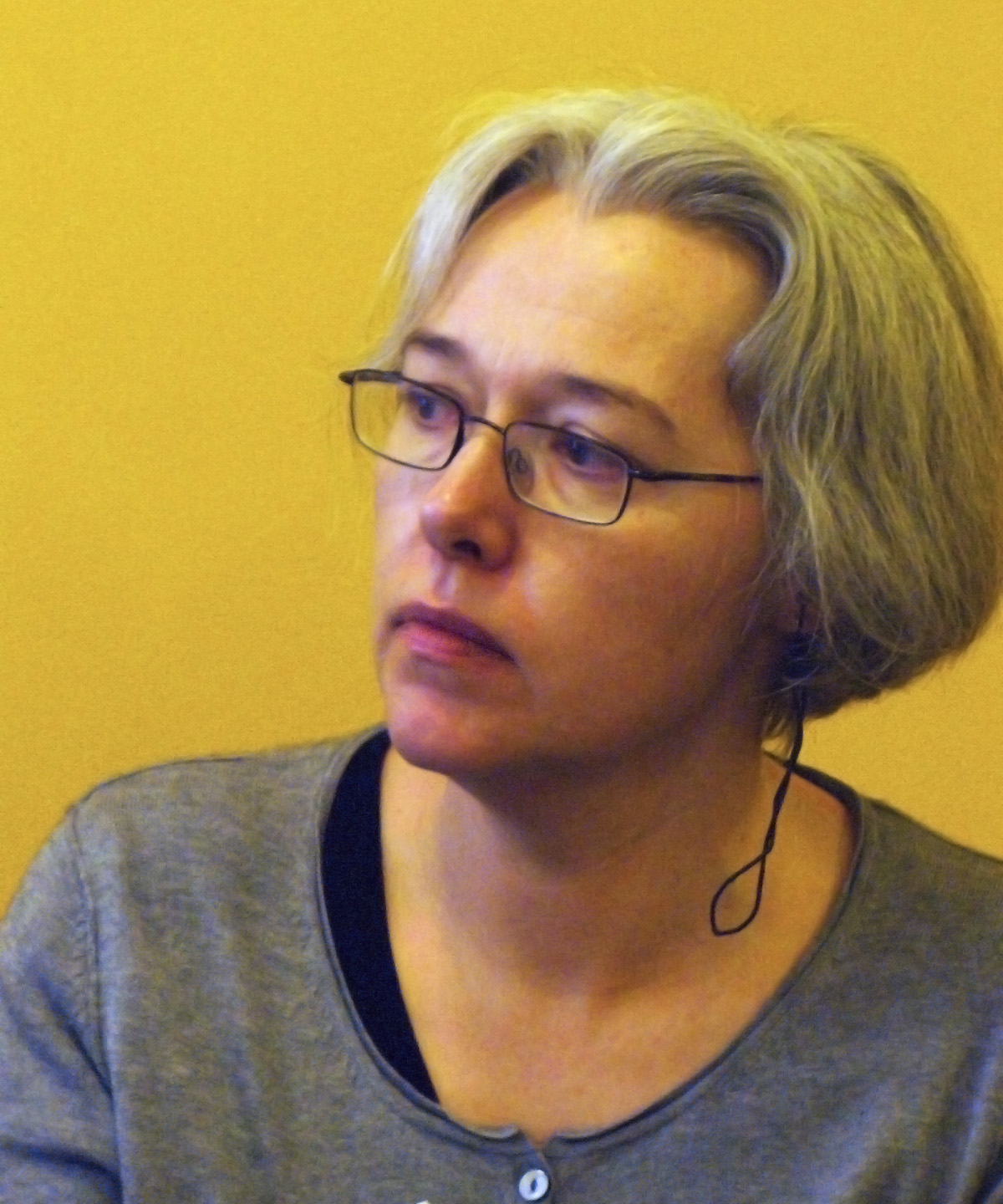
Susanna Clarke

- Rachel Caine (1962–2020), author of the Weather Warden and The Morganville Vampires novels
- James Branch Cabell (1879–1958), author of Biography of the Life of Manuel
- Miles Cameron, author of the Traitor Son Cycle
- Trudi Canavan (born 1969), author of the Age of the Five novels
- Orson Scott Card (born 1951), author of Ender's Game and Hart's Hope
- Jacqueline Carey (born 1964), author of Kushiel's Legacy and The Sundering
- Isobelle Carmody (born 1958), author of the Obernewtyn Chronicles and The Gathering
- Jonathan Carroll (born 1949), author of The Land of Laughs and Bones of the Moon
- Lewis Carroll (pseudonym of Charles Lutwidge Dodgson 1832–1898), author of Alice's Adventures in Wonderland
- Angela Carter (1940–1992), author of Shadow Dance
- Lin Carter (1930–1988) editor of the Ballantine Adult Fantasy series and author of The Wizard of Lemuria
- Sebastien de Castell, author of Traitor's Blade and sequels
- Vittorio Catani (1940–2020)
- Beth Cato (born 1980)
- Juraj Červenák (born 1974)
- Mark Chadbourn (born 1960), author of The Age of Misrule series
- Soman Chainani (born 1979), author of The School for Good and Evil series
- Jack L. Chalker (1944–2005), author of Midnight at the Well of Souls
- S. A. Chakraborty, author of The City of Brass
- Robert W. Chambers (1865–1933), author of The King in Yellow
- Karen Chance, author of the Cassandra Palmer and Dorina Basarab novels
- Joy Chant (born 1945), author of Red Moon and Black Mountain
- J. Kathleen Cheney (born 1964)
- C. J. Cherryh (born 1942), author of The Fortress Series
- G. K. Chesterton (1874–1936), author of The Man Who Was Thursday
- Cinda Williams Chima (born 1952), author of The Heir Chronicles
- Zen Cho (born 1986), author of Sorcerer Royal series
- Massimo Citi (born 1955)
- Cassandra Clare (born 1973), author of The Mortal Instruments
- C. L. Clark, author of The Unbroken
- P. Djèlí Clark (born 1971), author of A Master of Djinn
- Susanna Clarke (born 1959), author of Jonathan Strange & Mr Norrell
- Genevieve Cogman (born ???), author of the Invisible Library series and the Scarlett series
- Adrian Cole (born 1949), author of the Dream Lords series
- Myke Cole, author of The Sacred Throne series
- Sara Coleridge (1802–1852), author of Phantasmion
- Eoin Colfer (born 1965), author of the Artemis Fowl series
- John Collier (1901–1980), author of His Monkey Wife and Fancies and Goodnights
- Suzanne Collins (born 1962), author of The Hunger Games, Catching Fire and Mockingjay
- Brendan Connell (born 1970)
- Storm Constantine (1956–2021), author of the Wraeththu series
- Glen Cook (born 1944), author of The Black Company novels and Garrett P.I. novels
- Hugh Cook (1956–2008), author of the Chronicles of an Age of Darkness
- Rick Cook (1944–2022), author of the Wizardry series
- Louise Cooper (1952–2009), author of The Book of Paradox
- Susan Cooper (born 1935), author of The Dark Is Rising Sequence
- Larry Correia, author of the Monster Hunter series and founder of the Sad Puppies movement
- John Crowley (born 1942), author of Little, Big
- Lilith Saintcrow (born 1976) Strange Angels series
- Elaine Cunningham (born 1957), author of the Songs & Swords series
- Jane Louise Curry (born 1932), author of the Abaloc series

== D ==
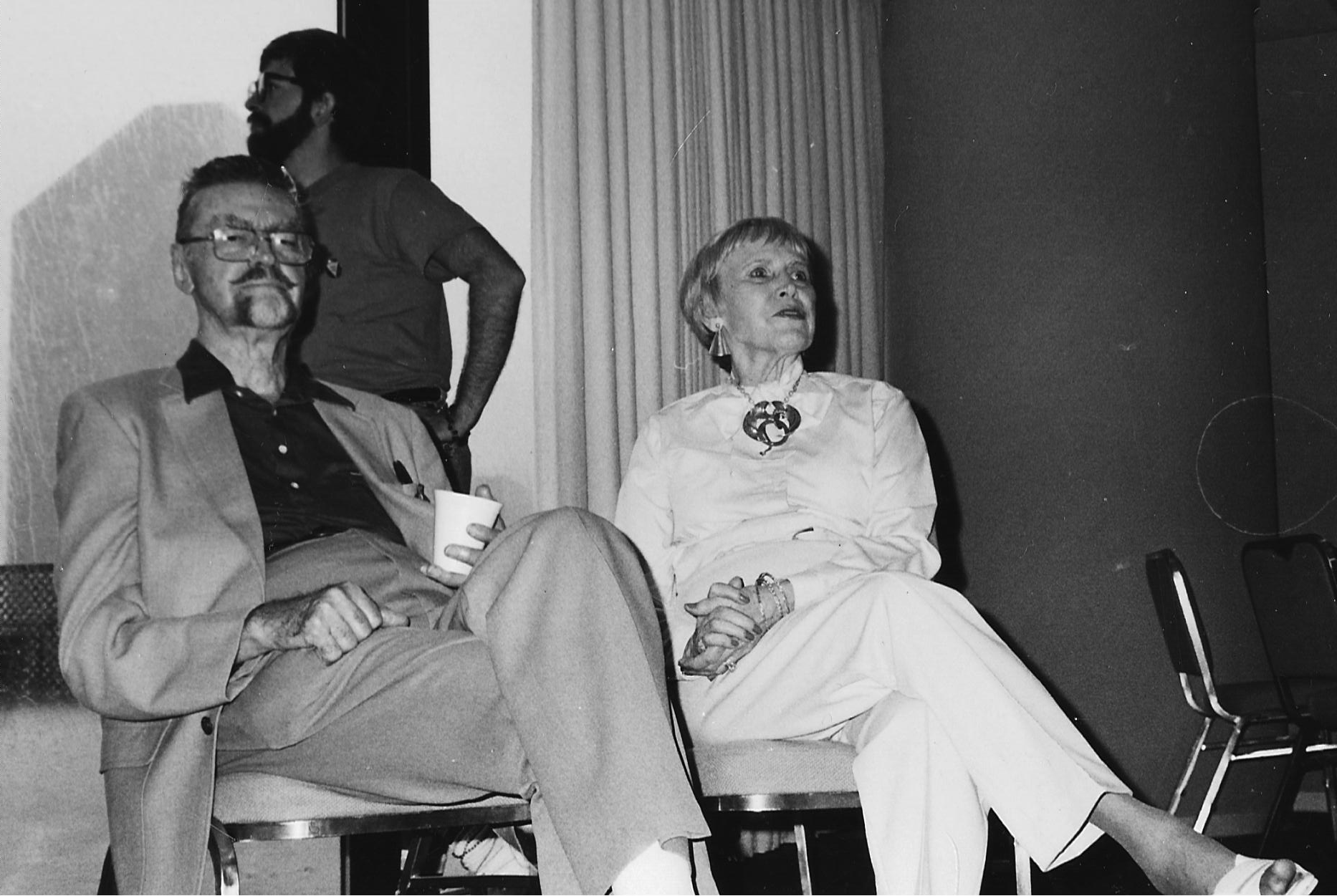
L. Sprague de Camp and Catherine Crook de Camp

- Roald Dahl (1916–1990), author of Charlie and the Chocolate Factory and James and the Giant Peach
- Gordon Dahlquist, author of the Glass Books series
- Henry Darger (1892–1973), author and illustrator of In the Realms of the Unreal
- James Dashner, author of The Maze Runner
- Avram Davidson (1923–1993), author of The Phoenix and the Mirror
- Sylvia Day (born 1973), author of Bared to You
- Adam James Dalton (born 1970), author of the Flesh & Bone Trilogy
- Pamela Dean (born 1953), author of Tam Lin
- John DeChancie (born 1946), author of the Castle Perilous series
- L. Sprague de Camp (1907–2000), author of The Compleat Enchanter & pasticheur of the Conan stories
- Alessandro Defilippi
- Michael de Larrabeiti (1934–2008), author of The Borrible Trilogy
- Charles de Lint (born 1951), author of the Borderland series
- Kathryn Deans, author of Shimmer
- Tom Deitz (1952–2009), author of the David Sullivan series
- Joseph Delaney (1945–2022), author of the Spook's series
- Samuel R. Delany (born 1942), author of the Return to Nevèrÿon series
- Troy Denning (born 1958), author of Dark Sun (Dungeons & Dragons) and Star Wars books
- Tracy Deonn, author of the Legendborn series
- Graham Diamond (born 1949), author of The Haven
- Seth Dickinson, author of The Traitor Baru Cormorant
- Tony DiTerlizzi (born 1969) co-author of (with Holly Black) The Spiderwick Chronicles
- Stephen Donaldson (born 1947), author of The Chronicles of Thomas Covenant
- Kevin Donoghue (born 1967), author of From The Devil We Came, The Adventures of Robyn Nudd, The Rise of Germania and Svengali Junior
- Carole Nelson Douglas (1944–2021), author of the Sword and Circlet, Taliswoman, and Delilah Street series as well as Irene Adler Sherlockian suspense novels
- Sara Douglass (1957–2011), author of Wayfarer Redemption
- Ann Downer (born 1960), author of the Spellkey series
- David Drake (1945–2023), author of the Lord of the Isles series
- Tobias Druitt, author of Corydon and the Island of Monsters
- Diane Duane (born 1952), author of the Young Wizards novels
- Dave Duncan (1933–2018), author of West of January
- Brian Lee Durfee, author of The Forgetting Moon
- Lord Dunsany (1878–1957) (Edward Plunkett), author of The King of Elfland's Daughter
- Jeanne DuPrau (born 1944), author of The City of Ember
- David Anthony Durham (born 1969), author of Acacia: The War with the Mein

== E ==
- David Eddings (1931–2009), author of Belgariad, Malloreon, Elenium, Tamuli and The Dreamers novels
- E. R. Eddison (1882–1945), author of The Worm Ouroboros
- C. M. Eddy Jr. (1896–1967), author of Exit Into Eternity: Tales of the Bizarre and Supernatural
- Graham Edwards (born 1965) writer of the Dragoncharm and Stone and Sky trilogies
- Phyllis Eisenstein (1946–2020), author of Shadow of Earth and Born to Exile
- Mircea Eliade (1907–1986), author of Bengal Nights
- Kate Elliott (born 1958), author of the Crown of Stars series
- Harlan Ellison (1934–2018) anthologist and author of Mefisto in Onyx
- Ernest Elmore (1901–1957), author of The Lumpton Gobbelings
- Michael Ende (1929–1995), author of The Neverending Story
- Steven Erikson (born 1959), author of the Malazan Book of the Fallen
- Lloyd Arthur Eshbach (1910–2003), author and proprietor of Fantasy Press
- Javier Abril Espinoza (born 1967)
- Ian Cameron Esslemont (born 1962), author of the Novels of the Malazan Empire series
- Rose Estes, creator of the Endless Quest gamebook series

== F ==
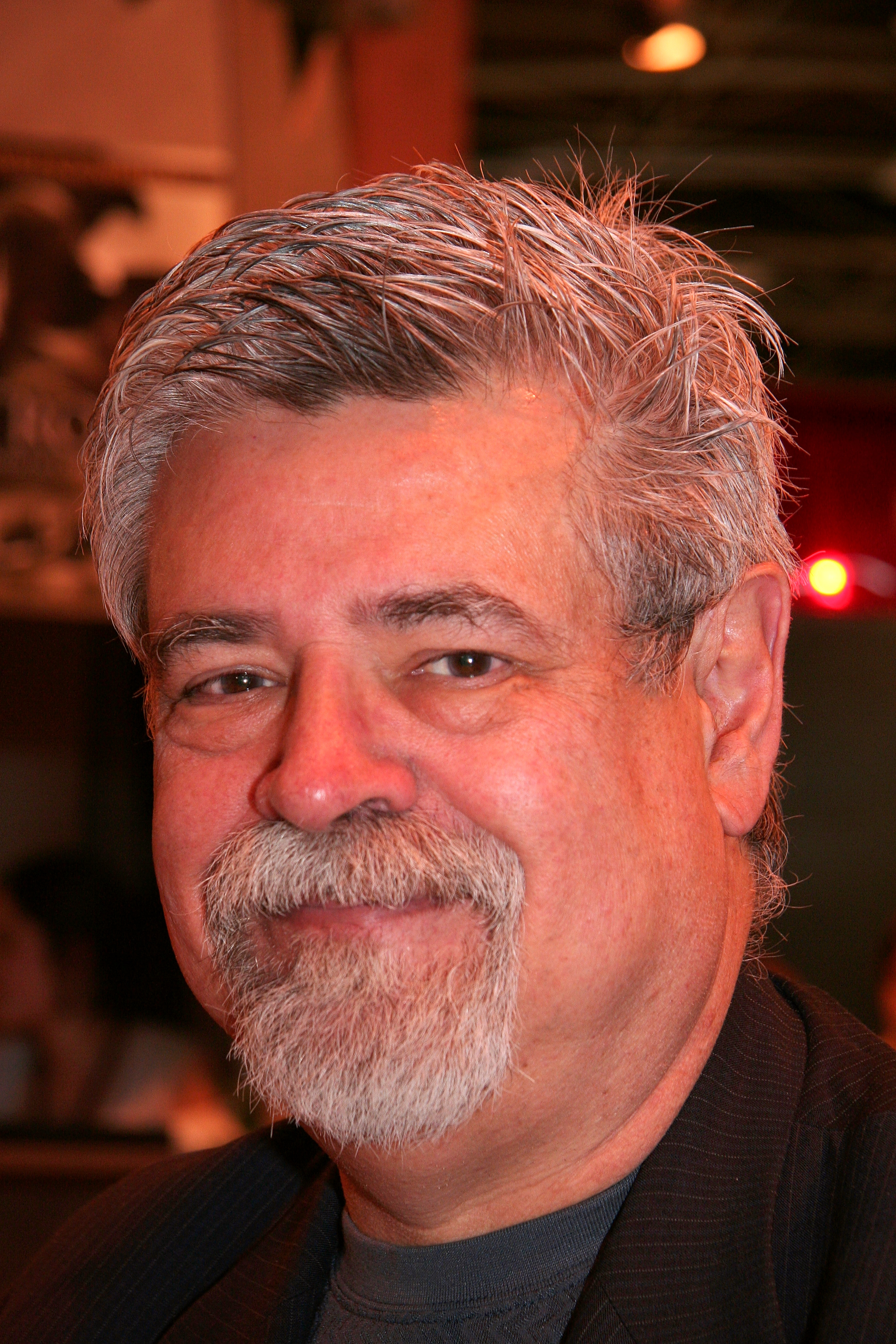
Raymond E. Feist

- Karina Fabian (born 1967)
- Jennifer Fallon (born 1959), author of Medalon
- Nancy Yi Fan (born 1993), author of Swordbird
- David Farland (occasional pen name of Dave Wolverton) (1957–2022), author of The Runelords series
- Nancy Farmer (born 1941), author of The Sea of Trolls
- Philip Jose Farmer (1918–2009), author of the Riverworld saga
- Christine Feehan, author of the Dark series
- Raymond E. Feist (born 1945), author of the Riftwar Saga
- Jean-Louis Fetjaine (born 1956)
- Jasper Fforde (born 1961), author of the Thursday Next series
- Charles G. Finney (1905–1984), author of The Circus of Dr. Lao
- Eliot Fintushel (born 1948), author of Breakfast with the Ones You Love
- John Flanagan (1944–2026), author of the Ranger's Apprentice series
- Michael R. Fletcher (born 1971)
- Lynn Flewelling (born 1958), author of The Nightrunner Series
- Eric Flint (1947–2022), author of the Belisarius series and creator of "1632 series"
- John M. Ford (1957–2006), author of The Dragon Waiting
- Namina Forna (born 1987), author of The Gilded Ones
- Kate Forsyth (born 1966), author of The Witches of Eileanan series
- Alan Dean Foster (born 1946), author of the Humanx Commonwealth novels, particularly those involving Flinx
- Laura Frankos (born 1960)
- Jackie French (born 1953), author of Somewhere Around the Corner and Tajore Arkle
- Celia S. Friedman (born 1957), author of Black Sun Rising
- Cornelia Funke (born 1958), author of the Inkheart series, The Thief Lord, and Dragon Rider
- Maggie Furey (1955–2016), author of The Artefacts of Power series

== G ==
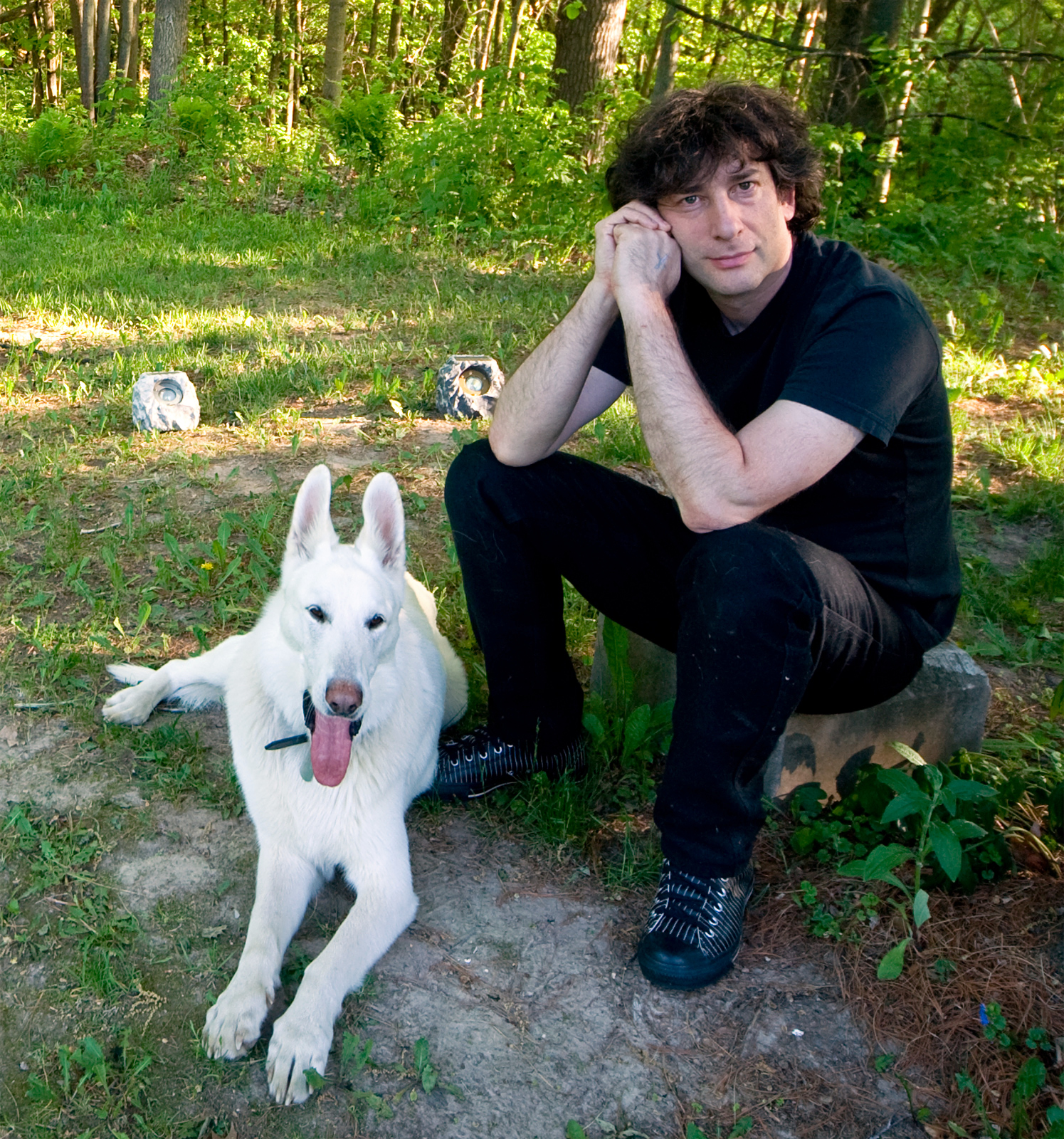
Neil Gaiman

- Diana Gabaldon (born 1952), author of the Outlander series
- Neil Gaiman (born 1960), author of novels, short stories, The Books of Magic and other graphic novels
- Sara Gallardo (1931–1988), author of Enero ("January") and El País del Humo ("Country of the Smoke")
- Craig Shaw Gardner (born 1949), author of the Dragon Circle series and film novelizations
- Richard Garfinkle (fl. 1990s), author of All of an Instant
- Alan Garner (born 1934), author of Elidor and The Weirdstone of Brisingamen
- Richard Garnett (1835–1906), author of The Twilight of the Gods and Other Tales
- Randall Garrett (1927–1987), author of the Lord Darcy novels
- David Gemmell (1948–2006), author of the Drenai novels
- Mary Gentle (born 1956), author of Rats and Gargoyles
- ElizaBeth Gilligan, author of Magic's Silken Snare and The Silken Shroud
- Laura Anne Gilman, author of the VineArt trilogy, the Cosa Nostradamus series and the Devil's West series
- Heather Gladney (born 1957), author of Teot's War and others
- Parke Godwin (1929–2013), author of The Last Rainbow, Sherwood, Firelord
- Christie Golden (born 1963), author of Vampire of the Mists and books set in the universes of Star Trek, Warcraft, Star Wars and others
- Christopher Golden (born 1967) co-author (with Mike Mignola) of Baltimore, or The Steadfast Tin Soldier and the Vampire; books set in the Buffy the Vampire Slayer universe; and non-Buffy novels in the Ghosts of Albion series with Buffy actress Amber Benson
- Julia Golding (born 1969), author of the Companions Quartet and the Cat Royal series
- Terry Goodkind (1948–2020), author of The Sword of Truth novels
- Ayana Gray (born 1993), author of Beasts of Prey
- Simon R. Green (born 1955), author of the "Forest Kingdom" series
- A. T. Greenblatt
- Gayle Greeno (born 1949), author of Finders Seekers
- Ed Greenwood (born 1959), author of The Elminster Series
- Marc J. Gregson (born 1985), author of the Above the Black trilogy
- Jim Grimsley (born 1955), author of the high fantasy novel Kirith Kirin
- Lev Grossman (born 1969), author of The Magicians (Grossman novel)
- Jeff Grubb (born 1957), author of the Finder's Stone trilogy with Kate Novak
- Gary Gygax (1938–2008), author of Dungeons & Dragons, other game rules, and fantasy books

== H ==
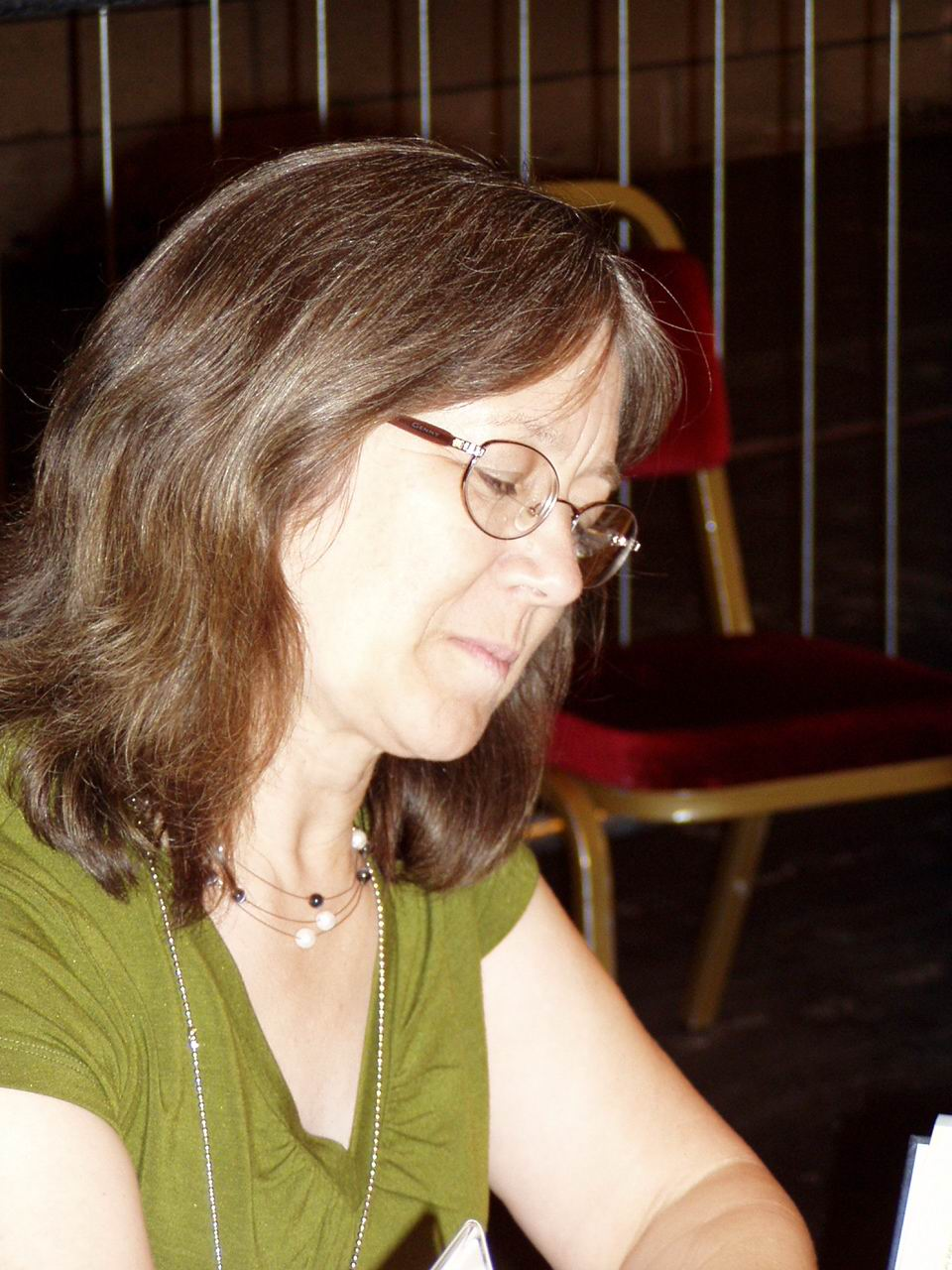
Robin Hobb/Megan Lindholm

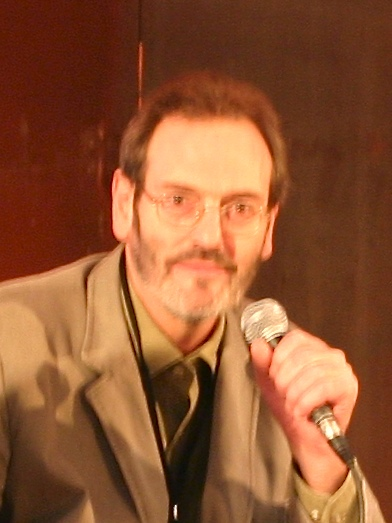
Robert Holdstock

- Sir H. Rider Haggard (1856–1925), author of the Allan Quatermain series and the Ayesha series (beginning with She)
- Andrea Hairston (born 1952), author of Redwood and Wildfire
- Barbara Hambly (born 1951), author of Those Who Hunt the Night
- Greg Hamerton (born 1973), author of the Tale of the Lifesong series
- Laurell K. Hamilton (born 1963), author of the Anita Blake: Vampire Hunter series
- Traci Harding (born 1964), author of The Ancient Future Trilogy
- Frances Hardinge (born 1973), author A Face Like Glass.
- Lyndon Hardy (born 1941), author of Master of the Five Magics
- Charlaine Harris (born 1951), author of The Southern Vampire Mysteries series, which HBO adapted as the TV series True Blood
- Geraldine Harris (born 1951) Egyptologist and author of Prince of the Godborn
- Edith Ogden Harrison (1862–1955), author of Prince Silverwings
- Kim Harrison (pen name of Dawn Cook) (born 1966), author of the Rachel Morgan / The Hollows series
- M. John Harrison (born 1945), author of works set in the fictional city of Viriconium; literary editor of the New Wave science fiction magazine New Worlds
- Alix E. Harrow (born 1989), author of The Ten Thousand Doors of January
- Petra Hartmann (born 1970)
- Simon Hawke (born 1951), author of The Wizard of 4th Street
- Hayami Yuji (born 1961)
- Elizabeth Haydon (born 1965), author of the Symphony of Ages series
- Markus Heitz, author of "The Dwarves" series
- Barb Hendee, author of the "Noble Dead" series
- Bernhard Hennen (born 1966)
- Frank Herda (1947–2023), author of The Cup of Death: Chronicles of the Dragons of the Magi
- Tracy Hickman (born 1955), author of the Dragonlance novels
- Jim C. Hines (born 1974), author of The Goblin Master's Grimoire
- Robin Hobb (born 1952) pseudonym of Margaret Astrid Lindholm Ogden who also writes as Megan Lindholm; author of Assassin's Apprentice
- John C. Hocking (born 1960), author of Conan and the Emerald Lotus
- P. C. Hodgell (born 1951), author of God Stalk
- William Hope Hodgson (1877–1918), author of The House on the Borderland and The Night Land
- E. T. A. Hoffmann (1776–1822), author of "The Nutcracker" and other fantastic stories
- Wolfgang Hohlbein (born 1953), author of Magic Moon
- Robert Holdstock (1948–2009), author of Mythago Wood
- Tom Holt (born 1961) writes mostly humorous fantasy, such as Who's Afraid of Beowulf?; also writes as K. J. Parker
- Nina Kiriki Hoffman (born 1955), author of The Thread That Binds the Bones
- Nalo Hopkinson (born 1960), author of Brown Girl in the Ring
- Anthony Horowitz (born 1955), author of The Power of Five series and Groosham Grange
- Elaine Horseman (1925–1999), author of Hubble's Bubble, The Hubbles' Treasure Hunt and The Hubbles and the Robot
- Robert E. Howard (1906–1936) creator of Conan the Barbarian and considered the father of the sword and sorcery genre
- Tanya Huff (born 1957), author of Blood Price
- Barry Hughart (1934–2019), author of Chinese historical fantasies such as Bridge of Birds
- Robert Don Hughes (1949–2023)
- Stephen Hunt, author of the Jackelian novels (steampunk; beginning with The Court of the Air)
- Faith Hunter, author of the Rogue Mage series, the Jane Yellowrock series, and (soon) the Soulwood trilogy
- Kameron Hurley, author of the Worldbreaker Saga

== I ==
- Eva Ibbotson (1925–2010) Which Witch? and The Secret of Platform 13
- Jordan Ifueko (born 1993), author of Raybearer
- Ian Irvine (born 1950) The View from the Mirror
- Ralf Isau (born 1956)
- James Islington (born c. 1981), author of The Shadow of What Was Lost and sequels
- Francisco Javier Illán Vivas (born 1958)

== J ==
- Benedict Jacka, author of the Alex Verus series
- Steve Jackson, co-author of many Fighting Fantasy books
- Brian Jacques (1939–2011), author of the Redwall series
- L. Dean James (1947–2018), author of Sorcerer's Stone
- Tove Jansson (1914–2001), author of the Moomin novels
- N. K. Jemisin (born 1972), author of The Hundred Thousand Kingdoms and The Fifth Season, along with their sequels
- K. V. Johansen (born 1968), author of Torrie and the Dragon
- Carrie Jones, author of the Need series and After Obsession
- Diana Wynne Jones (1934–2011), author of the Chrestomanci series and Howl's Moving Castle
- Howard Andrew Jones, author of The Chronicles of Hanuvar series, The Chronicles of Sword and Sand series and the Ring-Sworn trilogy
- Ivan Jones, author of The Ghost Hunter series
- J. V. Jones (born 1963), author of Sword of Shadows series
- Robert Jordan (pseudonym of James Oliver Rigney Jr.) (1948–2007), author of The Wheel of Time series
- Graham Joyce (1954–2014)

== K ==
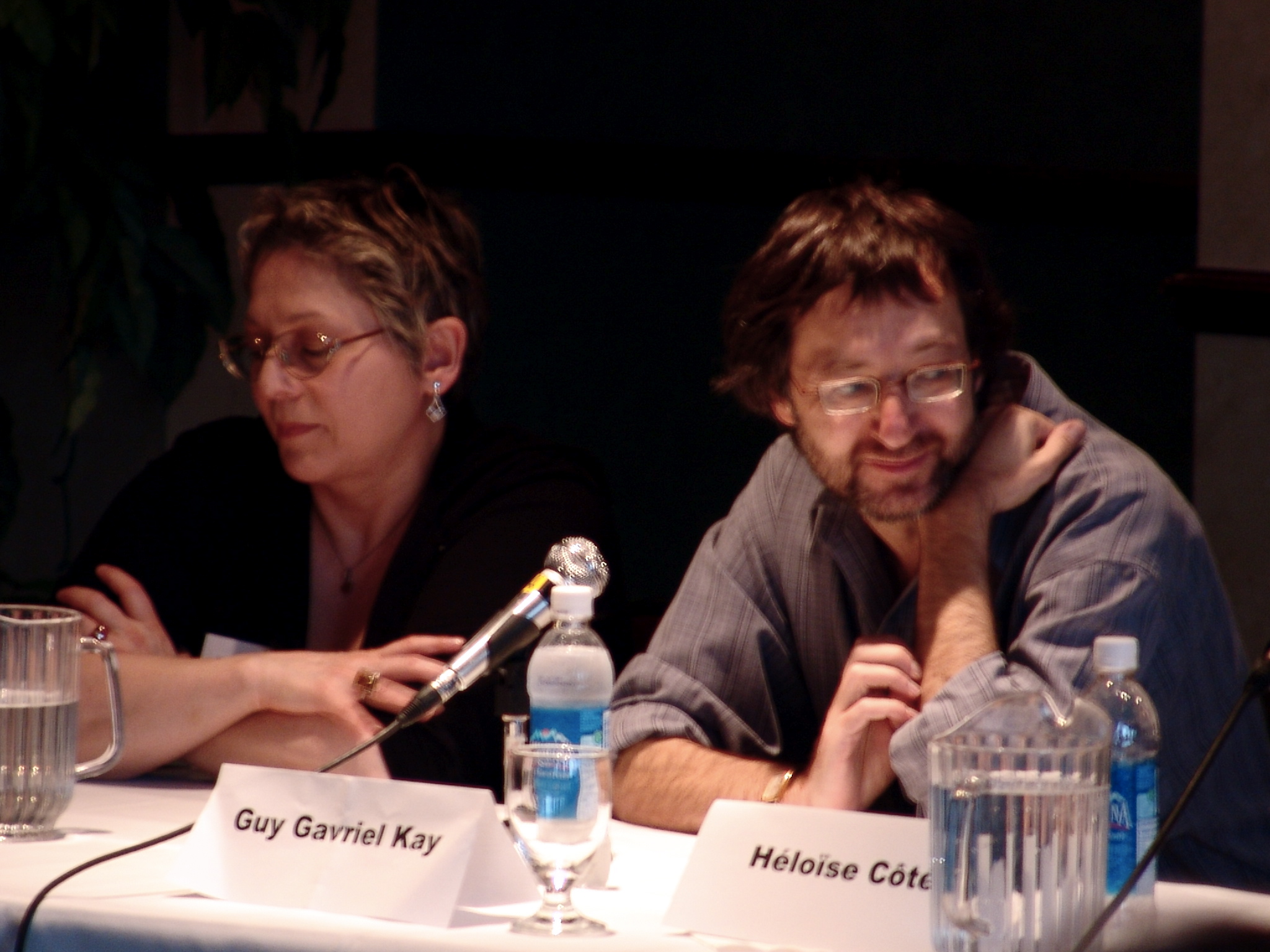
Guy Gavriel Kay and Elisabeth Vonarberg

- Lene Kaaberbøl (born 1960), author of The Shamer Chronicles
- Vilma Kadlečková (born 1981), author of the Mycelium series
- Lauren Kate (born 1981), author of The Fallen series
- Guy Gavriel Kay (born 1954), author of The Fionavar Tapestry and Tigana
- Paul Kearney (born 1967), author of the Monarchies of God series
- David Keck, author of the Durand Col series
- Sylvia Kelso, author of The Rihannar Chronicles
- Debra A. Kemp (1957–2015), author of Arthurian novels The Firebrand and The Recruit
- Paul S. Kemp, author of Twilight Falling (set in the world of the Forgotten Realms, and based on the Dungeons & Dragons role-playing game)
- Katharine Kerr (born 1944), author of the Deverry novels and others
- Greg Keyes (born 1963), author of The Kingdoms of Thorn and Bone series
- Jessica Khoury (born 1990), author of Origin and The Forbidden Wish
- Caitlín R. Kiernan (born 1964), author of Tales of Pain and Wonder
- Stephen King (born 1947), author of The Eyes of the Dragon and The Dark Tower Series
- Russell Kirkpatrick (born 1961), author of Fire of Heaven trilogy
- Mindy L. Klasky, author of The Glasswrights' Apprentice
- Annette Curtis Klause (born 1953), author of The Silver Kiss
- Richard A. Knaak (born 1961) contributor of books to the series Dragonlance, Warcraft, and others
- Vernon Knowles (1899–1968), The Street of Queer Houses and other Tales (1924)
- Mary Robinette Kowal (born 1969), author of Shades of Milk and Honey
- Feliks W. Kres (a pseudonym of Witold Chmielecki) (born 1966)
- R. F. Kuang (born 1996), author of The Poppy War
- Michael Kurland (born 1938), author of The Unicorn Girl
- Katherine Kurtz (born 1944), author of the Deryni novels
- Ellen Kushner (born 1955), author of Thomas the Rhymer
- Henry Kuttner (1915–1958)

== L ==
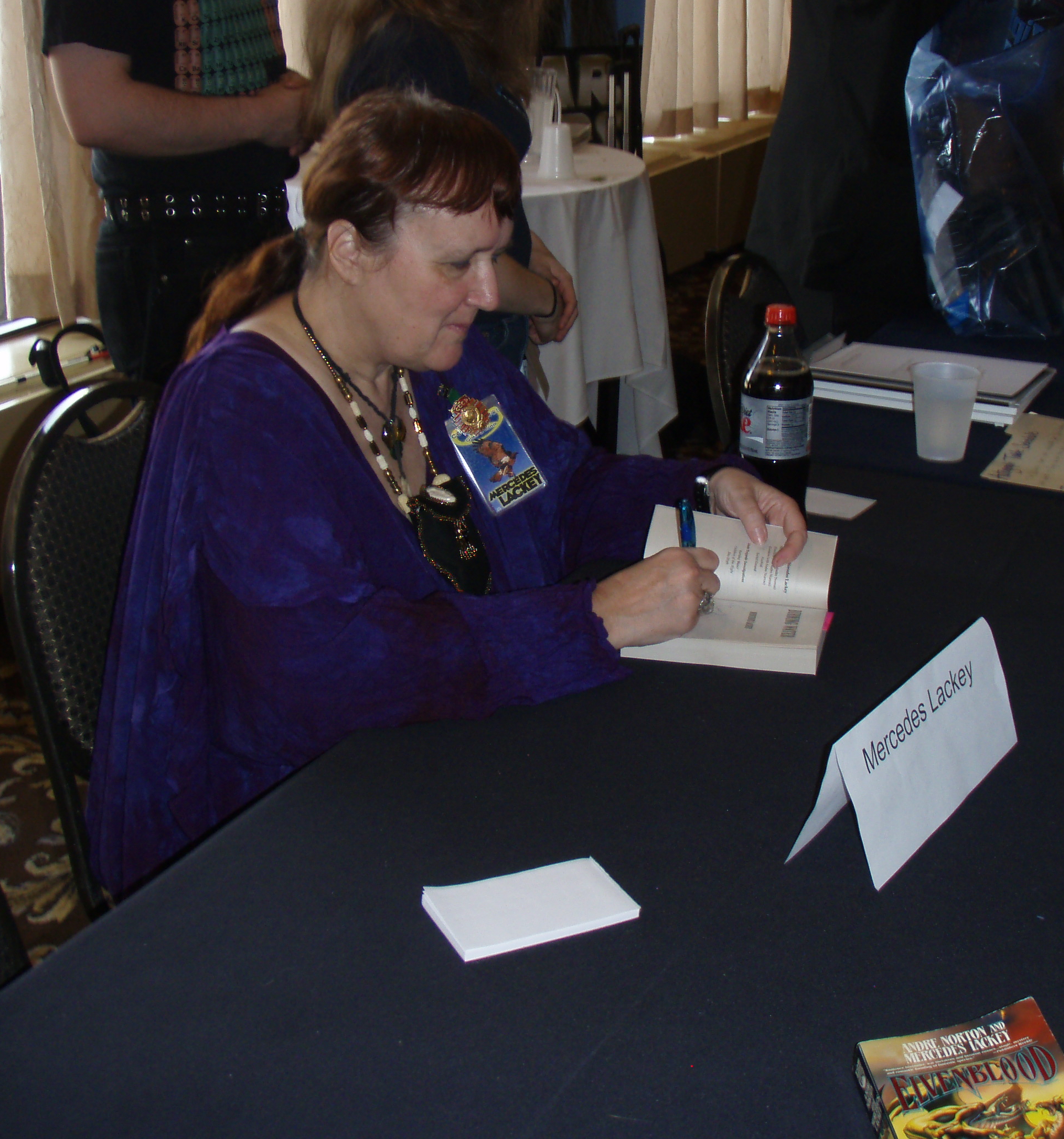
Mercedes Lackey

- Mercedes Lackey (born 1950), author of the Velgarth/Valdemar novels
- R. A. Lafferty (1914–2002), author of Fourth Mansions
- Sterling E. Lanier (1927–2007) editor; author of The Peculiar Exploits of Brigadier Ffellowes
- Victor LaValle (born 1972), author of The Changeling
- Stephen R. Lawhead (born 1950), author of In the Hall of the Dragon King
- Mark Lawrence (author) (born 1966), author of The Broken Empire Trilogy
- Mary Soon Lee (born 1965), author of The Sign of the Dragon
- Tanith Lee (1947–2015), author of the Tales from the Flat Earth series
- Lee Yeongdo (born 1972), author of the Dragon Raja
- Fonda Lee (born 1979), author of The Green Bone Saga
- Yoon Ha Lee (born 1979), author of Phoenix Extravagant
- Ursula K. Le Guin (1929–2018), author of the Earthsea novels
- Fritz Leiber (1910–1992), author of the Fafhrd and the Gray Mouser stories
- Valery Leith (born 1968) pseudonym of Tricia Sullivan
- R. B. Lemberg (born 1976), author of The Four Profound Weaves and The Unbalancing
- Madeleine L'Engle (1918–2007), author of A Wrinkle in Time
- C. S. Lewis (1898–1963), author of The Chronicles of Narnia series, The Space Trilogy, and The Screwtape Letters
- Astrid Lindgren (1907–2002), author of Pippi Longstocking
- Megan Lindholm (born 1952) pseudonym of Margaret Astrid Lindholm Ogden who also writes as Robin Hobb
- David Lindsay (1876–1945), author of A Voyage to Arcturus
- Jane Lindskold (born 1962), author of the Firekeeper saga
- Holly Lisle (born 1960), author of The Secret Texts and Korre series
- Ken Liu (born 1976)
- Ken Lizzi (born 1969)
- Ian Livingstone, co-author of many Fighting Fantasy books
- H. P. Lovecraft, author of the Cthulhu Mythos
- Ruth Frances Long (born 1971), author of The Treachery of Beautiful Things
- James Lowder (born 1963), author of Prince of Lies and Knight of the Black Rose
- Helen Lowe (born 1961), author of the Heir of Night series
- Lois Lowry (born 1937), author of The Giver and Gathering Blue
- Elizabeth A. Lynn (born 1946), author of The Chronicles of Tornor
- Patricia Lynch (1894–1972), author of The Turf-cutter's Donkey
- Scott Lynch (born 1978), author of The Gentleman Bastard sequence

== M ==
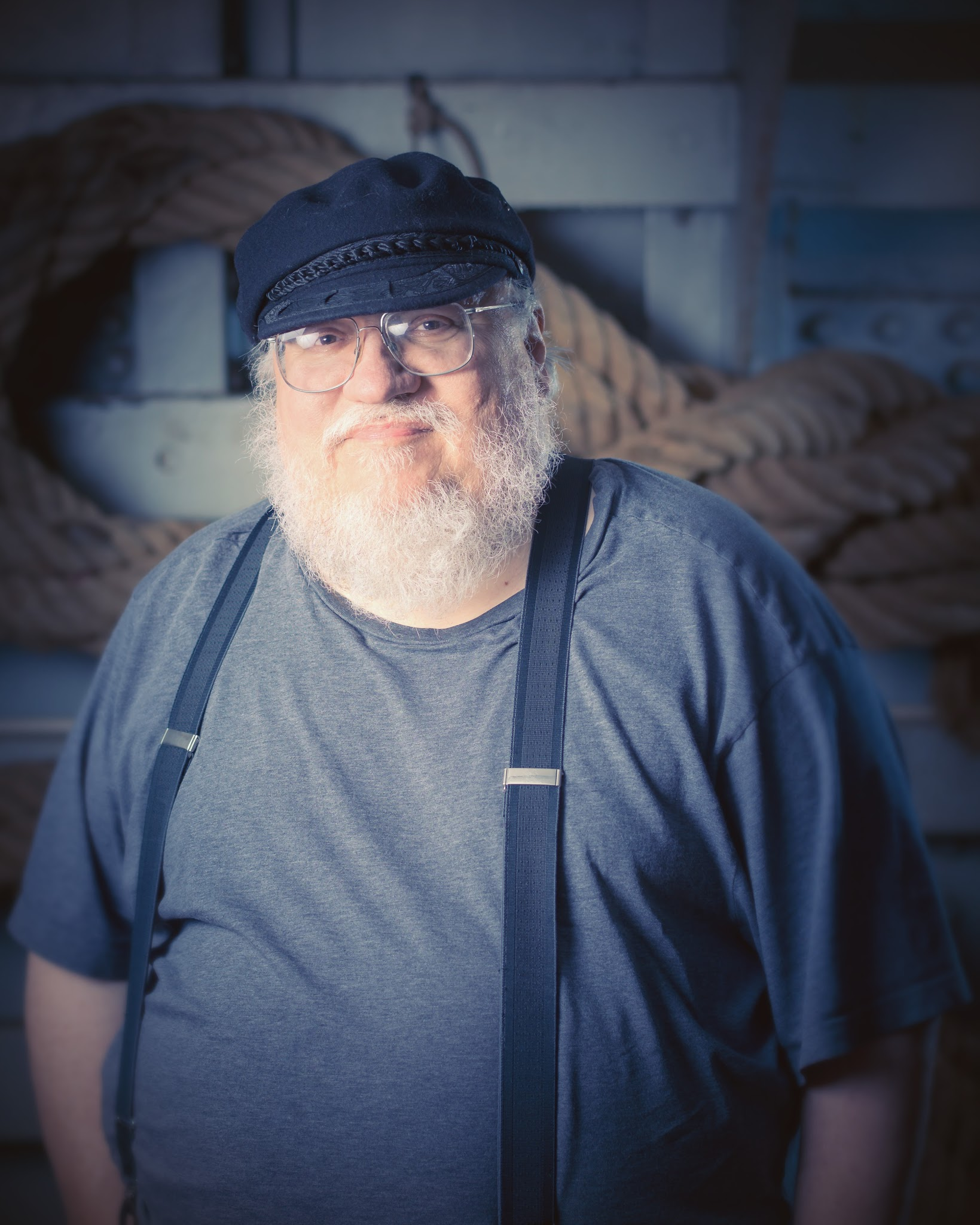
George R. R. Martin

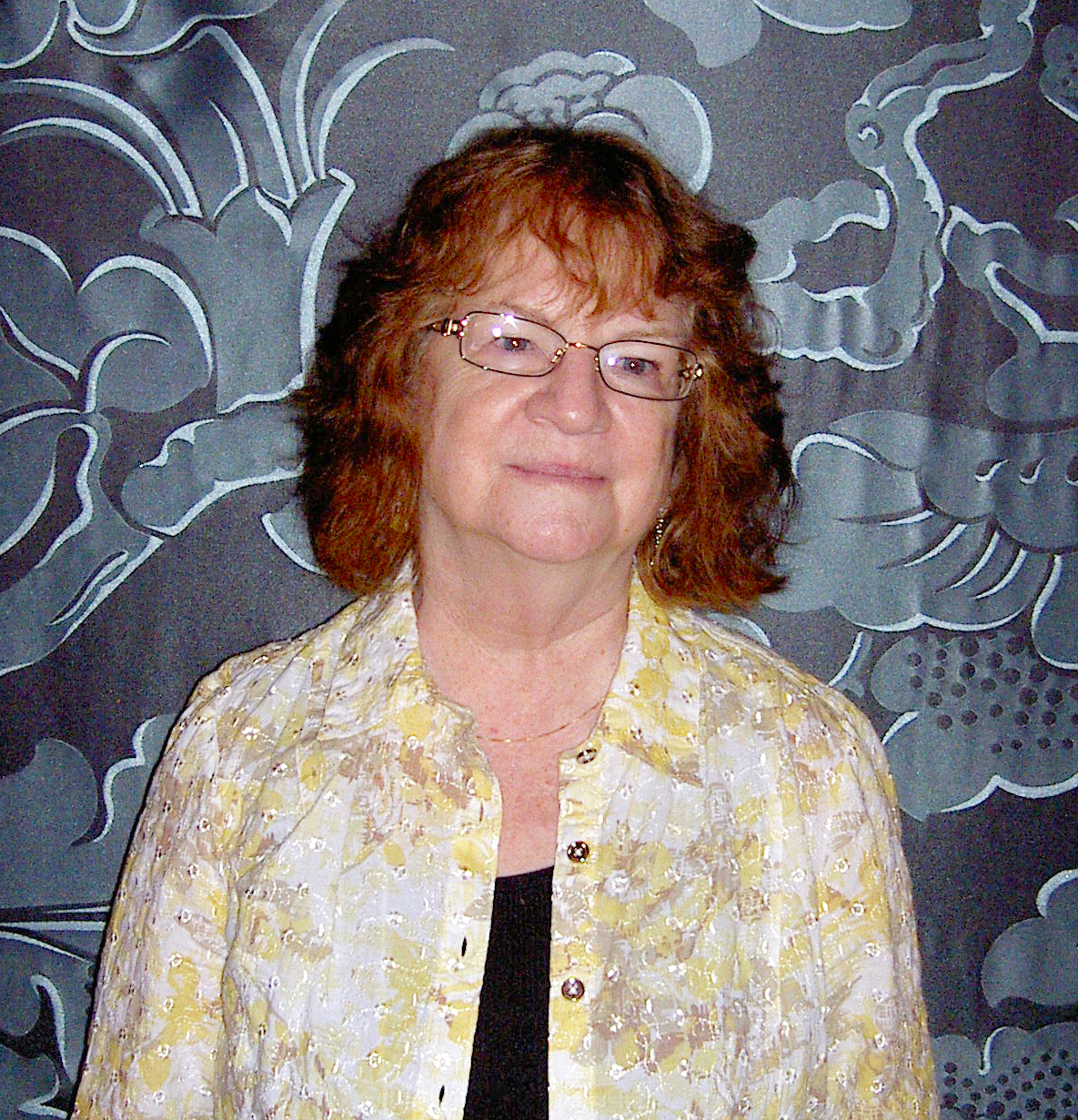
Patricia McKillip

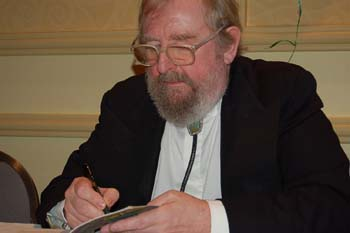
Michael Moorcock

- Sarah J. Maas (born 1986), author of Throne of Glass series
- Julian May (1931–2017)
- R. A. MacAvoy (born 1949), author of Tea with the Black Dragon
- George MacDonald (1824–1905), author of Lilith
- D. J. MacHale (born 1956), author of the Pendragon series
- Arthur Machen (1863–1947), author of The Great God Pan
- Violette Malan, author of The Mirror Prince
- Lisa Mantchev, author of Eyes Like Stars
- Juliet Marillier (born 1948), author of the Sevenwaters Trilogy
- Stephen Marley, author of the Chia Black Dragon series
- George R. R. Martin (born 1948), author of A Song of Ice and Fire
- Thomas K. Martin (born 1960)
- John Masefield (1878–1967)
- Anne McCaffrey (1926–2011), author of the Dragonriders of Pern series
- Brian McClellan, author of The Powder Mage trilogy
- Seanan McGuire (born 1978), author of Rosemary and Rue; also writes as Mira Grant (Feed)
- Fiona McIntosh (born 1960), author of The Quickening series
- Juliet E. McKenna (born 1965), author of The Thief's Gamble
- Dennis L. McKiernan (born 1932), author of The Iron Tower
- Patricia A. McKillip (1948–2022), author of The Riddle-Master of Hed
- Richelle Mead (born 1976), author of the Vampire Academy and the Bloodlines series
- Robin McKinley (born 1952), author of the Damar stories
- John Meaney (born 1957), author of Bone Song
- O. R. Melling, author of The Hunter's Moon
- Abraham Merritt (1884–1943), author of The Moon Pool
- Shannon Messenger, author of Keeper of the Lost Cites
- Gustav Meyrink (1868–1932), author of The Golem
- Marissa Meyer (born 1984), author of The Lunar Chronicles series
- Stephenie Meyer (born 1973), author of the Twilight series
- China Miéville (born 1972), author of Perdido Street Station
- Karen Miller, author of The Innocent Mage
- A. A. Milne (1882–1956), author of Winnie-the-Pooh and The House at Pooh Corner
- Hope Mirrlees (1887–1978), author of Lud-in-the-Mist
- L. E. Modesitt Jr. (born 1943), author of the Recluce novels
- Elizabeth Moon (born 1945), author of The Deed of Paksenarrion
- Michael Moorcock (born 1939), author of Eternal Champion sequence
- Christopher Moore (born 1957), author of Practical Demonkeeping
- Caiseal Mór, author of 12 novels including The Wanderers and The Watchers trilogies.
- A. R. Morlan (1958–2016), author of Of Vampires & Gentlemen: Tales of Erotic Horror
- John Morressy (1930–2006), author of The Domesticated Wizard
- Chris Morris (born 1946)
- Janet Morris (1946–2024)
- Kenneth Morris (1879–1937)
- William Morris (1834–1896), author of The Wood Beyond the World and The Well at the World's End
- Bethany C. Morrow, author of A Song Below Water
- Tamsyn Muir (born 1985), author of Gideon the Ninth
- H. Warner Munn (1903–1981), author of Merlin's Ring
- C. E. Murphy (born 1973), author of Coyote Dreams
- Pat Murphy (born 1955), author of The Falling Woman
- Gary Myers (born 1952), author of The House of the Worm
- John Myers Myers (1906–1988), author of Silverlock
- Sarah Mlynowski (born 1977), author of Best Wishes

== N ==
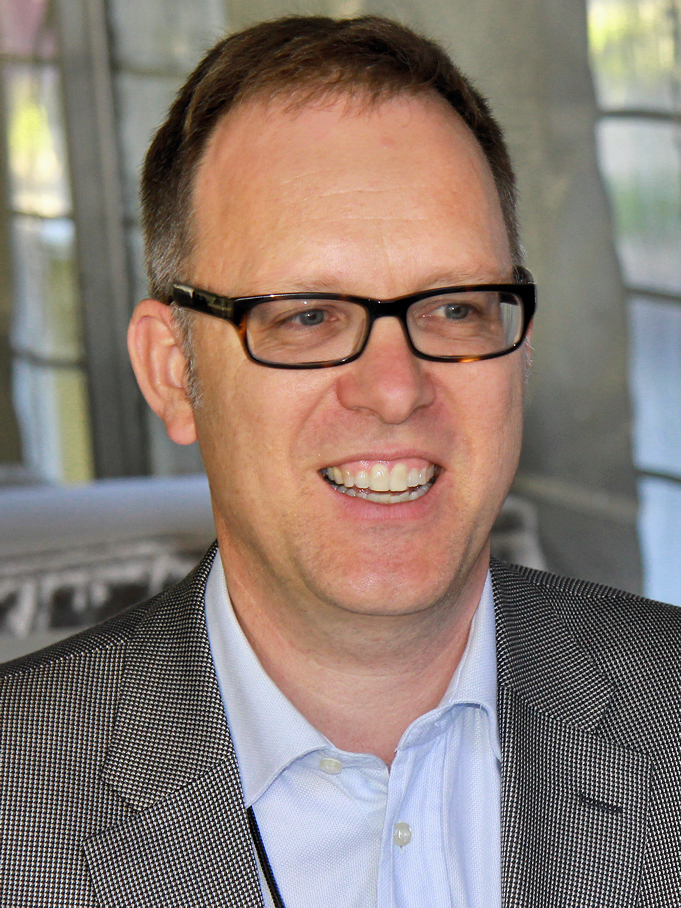
Garth Nix

- Robert Nathan (1894–1985), author of Portrait of Jennie
- Geoff Nelder (born 1947), author of Exit, Pursued by a Bee
- Robert Newcomb, author of A March into Darkness
- Mark Charan Newton (born 1981), author of The Legends of the Red Sun
- William Nicholson (born 1948), author of The Wind Singer
- Douglas Niles, author of the Watershed trilogy and other series
- Jenny Nimmo (born 1944), author of Children of the Red King and The Magician Trilogy
- Larry Niven (born 1938), author of The Magic May Return
- Garth Nix (born 1963), author of Sabriel and sequels
- Charles Nodier (1790–1844)
- Alyson Noël, author of Evermore
- John Norman (born 1931), author of the Gor series
- Claire North, pseudonym for Catherine Webb, author of The First Fifteen Lives of Harry August
- Andre Norton (1912–2005), author of High Sorcery
- Kate Novak, author of the Finder's Stone trilogy with Jeff Grubb
- Naomi Novik, author of the Temeraire series
- Jody Lynn Nye, author of the Mythology 101 series and co author of the MythAdventures series with Robert Asprin.
- Eric S. Nylund (born 1964)

== O ==
- Raven Oak (born 1977), author of the Boahim Series
- Andrew J. Offutt (1934–2013)
- Noriko Ogiwara
- Nnedi Okorafor (born 1974), author of Akata Witch and Who Fears Death
- Tochi Onyebuchi (born 1987), author of the Beasts Made of Night series and Riot Baby
- Karen Osborne (born 1980)
- Thomas Owen

== P ==
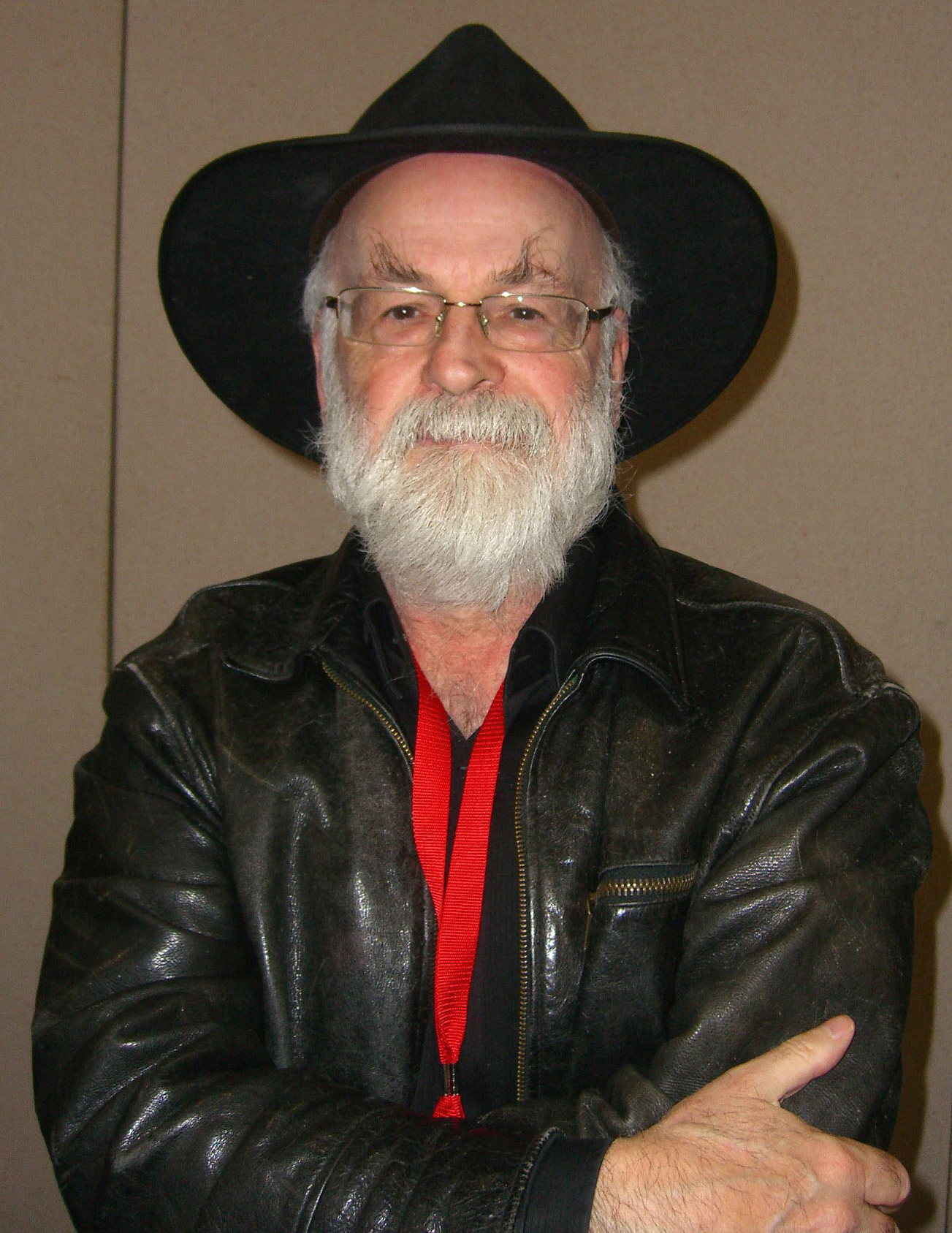
Terry Pratchett

- Norvell W. Page (1904–1961)
- Christopher Paolini (born 1983), author of The Inheritance Cycle
- Richard Parks (born 1955)
- H. G. Parry, author of The Shadow Histories series
- Michelle Paver, author of The Chronicles of Ancient Darkness series
- Diana L. Paxson (born 1943), author of Brísingamen
- Mervyn Peake (1911–1968), author of the Gormenghast series
- Frank E. Peretti (born 1951), author of This Present Darkness and The Oath
- Anne Perry (1938–2023), author of Tathea
- Nick Perumov (born 1963), author of Ring of Darkness, Chronicles of Hjorward and Keeper of Swords series
- Uroš Petrović (born 1967)
- Siri Pettersen (born 1971)
- Eden Phillpotts (1862–1960), author of Lycanthrope: The Mystery of Sir William Wolf
- Meredith Ann Pierce (born 1958), author of The Darkangel Trilogy
- Tamora Pierce (born 1954), author of the Tortall books, The Song of the Lioness series and the Circle of Magic books
- Ricardo Pinto (born in 1961), author of The Stone Dance of the Chameleon series
- Tim Powers (born 1952), author of The Anubis Gates
- Anne Plichota, author of Oksa Pollock
- C. L. Polk (born 1969), author of The Kingston Cycle
- Terry Pratchett (1948–2015), author of Discworld
- Fletcher Pratt (1897–1956), author of The Well of the Unicorn
- E. Hoffmann Price (1898–1988), author of The Devil Wives of Li Fong
- Philip Pullman (born 1946), author of His Dark Materials trilogy

== R ==
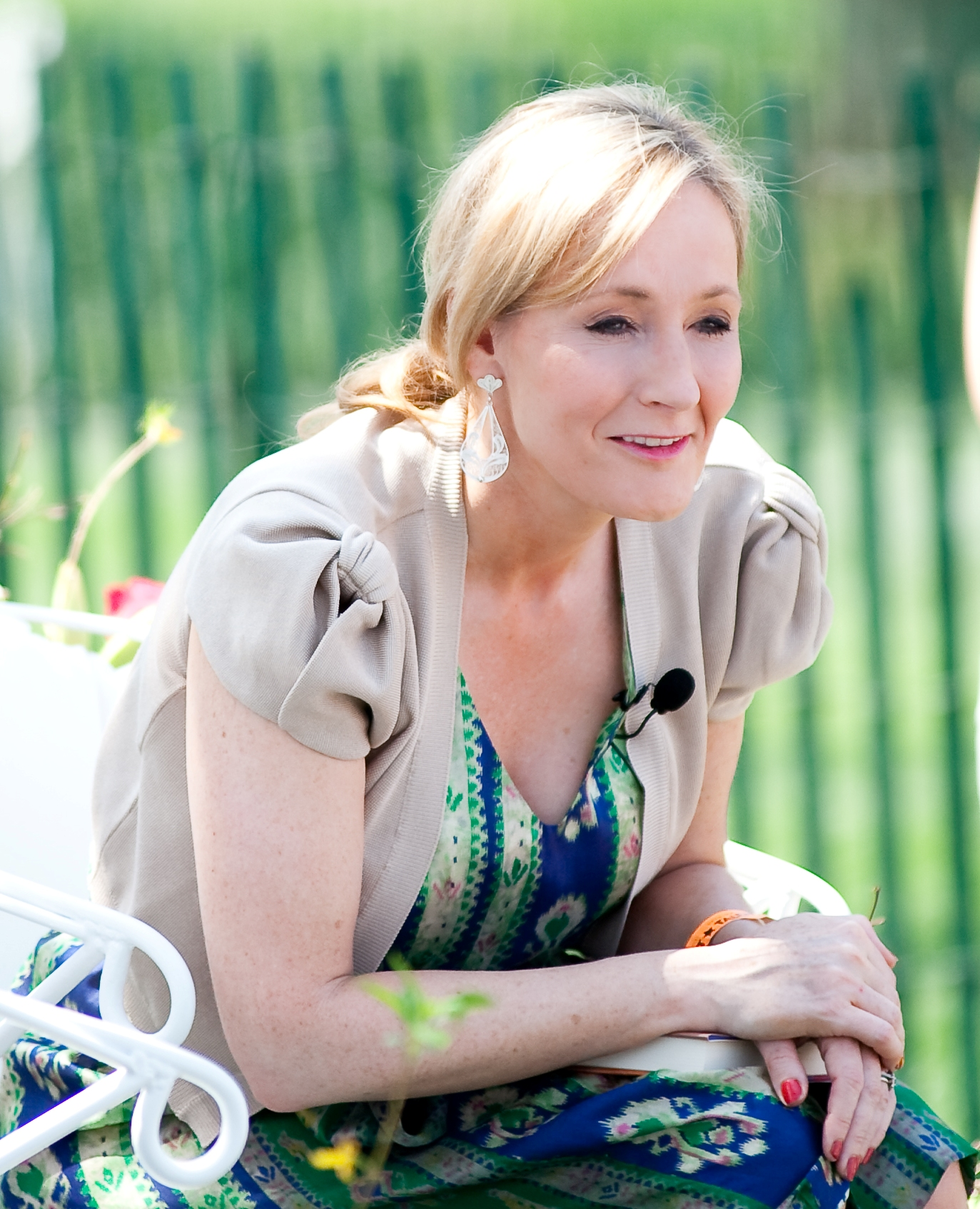
J. K. Rowling

- Jean Ray, pseudonym of Raymundus Joannes de Kremer (1887–1964), Belgian fantasist
- Melanie Rawn (born 1954), author of Dragon Prince
- Philip Reeve, author of Mortal Engines Quartet and Fever Crumb series
- Mickey Zucker Reichert (pseudonym of Miriam Susan Zucker Reichert, born 1962), author of the Renshai series, based on Norse mythology
- Anne Rice (1941–2021), author of The Vampire Chronicles
- L. James Rice (born 1968), author of the Sundering the Gods Saga
- Rick Riordan (born 1964), author of the Percy Jackson and the Olympians and Heroes of Olympus series
- Rebecca Roanhorse (born 1971), author of the Between Earth and Sky series
- Jennifer Roberson (born 1953), author of the Sword-Dancer Saga
- Katherine Roberts (born 1962), author of The Echorium Sequence trilogy
- Nora Roberts (born 1950), author of The Circle Trilogy
- Kenneth Robeson (pseudonym of Lester Dent among others) Doc Savage stories
- Michael Scott Rohan (1951–2018), author of the Winter of the World series
- Joel Rosenberg (1954–2011), author of the Guardians of the Flame series
- Patrick Rothfuss (born 1973), author of The Name of the Wind
- Veronica Roth, author of Divergent series
- M. A. Rothman
- Jennifer Rowe, author of Deltora Quest, The Three Doors, and others
- J. K. Rowling (born 1965), author and writer of the Harry Potter and Fantastic Beasts series
- Don Roff (born 1966), author of Zombies: A Record of the Year of Infection
- Christopher Ruocchio
- Kristine Kathryn Rusch (born 1960) Fey series and others, former editor of F&SF
- Sean Russell (born 1952), author of Moontide and Magic Rise
- A. Merc Rustad (born 1986)
- Anthony Ryan, author of the Raven's Shadow series
- Jessica Rydill (born 1959), author of Children of the Shaman
- C. J. Redwine (born 1974), author of the Defiance Trilogy, the Ravenspire series and others

== S ==
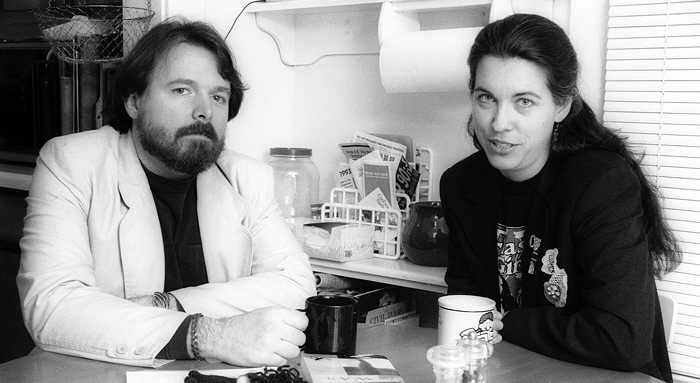
Will Shetterly and Emma Bull

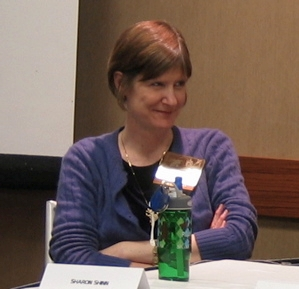
Sharon Shinn

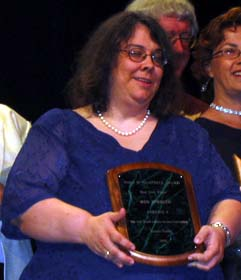
Wen Spencer

- Fred Saberhagen (1930–2007), author of the Empire of the East, The Swords and The Lost Swords series
- Michelle Sagara, author of the Sundered series
- Angie Sage, author of the Septimus Heap series
- Jessica Amanda Salmonson (born 1950), author of the Tomoe Gozen series
- R.A. Salvatore (born 1959), author of the Drizzt novels
- Margit Sandemo (1924–2018)
- Brandon Sanderson (born 1975), author of the Mistborn and The Stormlight Archive series
- Andrzej Sapkowski (born 1948), author of Witcher short stories and novels
- Charles R. Saunders (1946–2020), author of Imaro
- Lawrence M. Schoen (born 1959), author of the Conroyverse series
- V.E. Schwab, pseudonym for Victoria Schwab (born 1987), author of Shades of Magic trilogy
- Darrell Schweitzer (born 1952)
- Michael Scott (born 1959), author of The Secrets of the Immortal Nicholas Flamel series
- Martin Scott (born 1959), author of "Thraxas"
- Darren Shan, author of The Saga of Darren Shan, The Demonata and short stories
- Samantha Shannon (born 1991), author of The Priory of the Orange Tree
- Nisi Shawl (born 1955), author of the Everfair series
- Robert Sheckley (1928–2005)
- Mary Shelley (1797–1851), author of Frankenstein and short stories
- Will Shetterly (born 1955), author of Dogland
- Tony Shillitoe (born 1955), author of The Andrakis Trilogy
- Sharon Shinn (born 1957), author of The Twelve Houses series
- Gary Shipman (born 1966), author of Pakkins' Land
- Rhoda Shipman (born 1968), author of Pakkins' Land
- Robert Silverberg (born 1935), author of the Majipoor series
- William Mark Simmons (Wm. Mark Simmons) (born 1953)
- Johanna Sinisalo (born 1958)
- Isaac Bashevis Singer (1902–1991)
- Sharon Skinner (born 1956), author of The Healer's Legacy and others
- Clark Ashton Smith (1893–1961) one of "the big three of Weird Tales, along with Robert E. Howard and H. P. Lovecraft"; author of Out of Space and Time
- Guy Smith (born 1957)
- L. J. Smith (born 1965), author of the Night World, The Vampire Diaries and The Secret Circle series
- Mark Andrew Smith, author of The New Brighton Archeological Society
- Sherwood Smith (born 1951), author of Inda (novel) and Wren to the Rescue
- Thorne Smith (1892–1934), author of Topper, on which a 1937 comedy film was based
- S. P. Somtow (pseudonym of Somtow Sucharitkul, born 1952), author of Vampire Junction
- Anna Smith Spark, author of the Empires of Dust trilogy
- Alison Spedding (born 1962), author of The Road and the Hills
- Wen Spencer (born 1963), author of Elfhome
- Nancy Springer (born 1948), author of The White Hart
- Jon Sprunk (born 1970)
- Michael A. Stackpole (born 1957), author of A Secret Atlas; best known for his Star Wars and BattleTech books
- Christopher Stasheff (1944–2018), author of The Warlock in Spite of Himself
- Brian Staveley, author of the Chronicles of the Unhewn Throne
- Brynne Stephens (born 1958), author of The Dream Palace
- George Sterling (1869–1926), author of "A Wine of Wizardry"
- Brooke Stevens, author of The Circus of the Earth and the Air
- Mary Stewart (1916–2014), author of The Crystal Cave
- Paul Stewart, author of The Edge Chronicles
- Caroline Stevermer (born 1955), author of The Serpent's Egg
- Maggie Stiefvater (born 1981), author of The Raven Cycle
- Frank R. Stockton (1834–1902), author of "The Lady, or the Tiger?"
- James Stoddard, author of The High House
- Adrian Stone (born 1958), author of Devil Trilogy
- David Lee Stone, author of The Illmoor Chronicles
- Charles Stross (born 1964)
- Jonathan Stroud, author of The Bartimaeus Trilogy
- Tricia Sullivan (born 1968) writes fantasy as Valery Leith (The Company of Glass)
- Michael J. Sullivan (born 1961), author of The Riyria Chronicles
- Tui T. Sutherland (born 1978), editor of Warriors and author of Wings of Fire
- Thomas Burnett Swann (1928–1976), author of The Day of the Minotaur
- Michael Swanwick (born 1950), author of The Iron Dragon's Daughter and sequels
- Jonathan Swift (1667–1745), author of Gulliver's Travels
- Mitzi Szereto, author of In Sleeping Beauty's Bed: Erotic Fairy Tales and editor of Thrones of Desire: Erotic Tales of Swords, Mist and Fire

== T ==
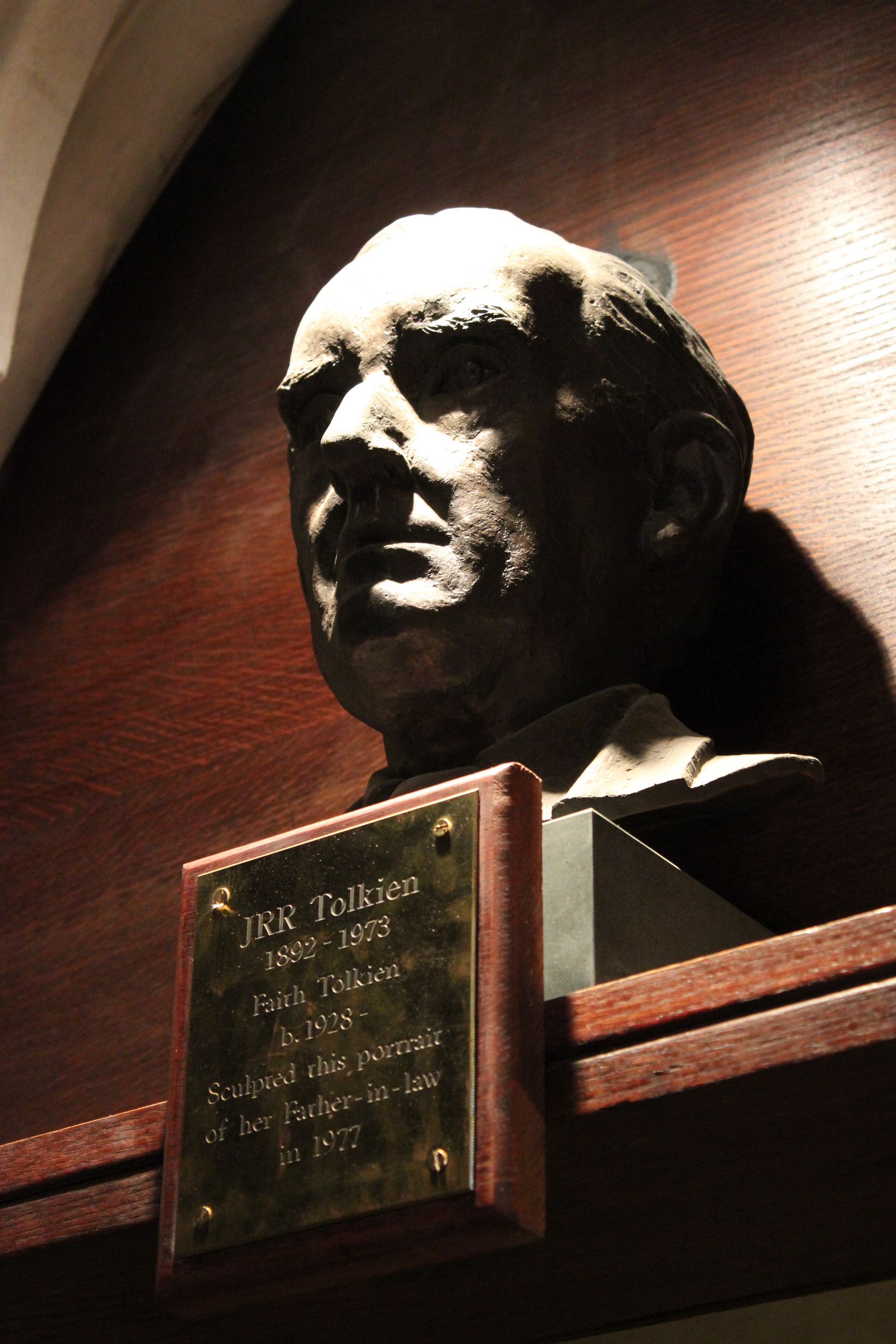
Bust of J. R. R. Tolkien from Exeter College

- Graeme K. Talboys, author of Stealing into Winter
- Yoshiki Tanaka, author of The Heroic Legend of Arslan
- Charles R. Tanner (1896–1974), author of Angus MacAuliffe and the Gowden Tooch
- Judith Tarr (born 1955), author of The Hound and the Falcon
- Roger Taylor, author of the Chronicles of Hawklan
- Adrian Tchaikovsky, author of the Shadows of the Apt series
- Tais Teng (born 1952), author of "Palimpsests"
- Sheri S. Tepper (1929–2016), author of The True Game series
- Karin Tidbeck (born 1977), author of Jagannath
- Lavie Tidhar (born 1976), author of A Man Lies Dreaming
- Patrick Tilley (1928–2020), author of The Amtrak Wars series
- Eldon Thompson (born 1974), author of The Legend of Asahiel series
- Kate Thompson (born 1956), author of Switchers
- Tade Thompson, author of the Wormwood Trilogy
- J. R. R. Tolkien (1892–1973), author of The Hobbit, The Lord of the Rings and The Silmarillion
- Eugenia Triantafyllou (fl. 2017-present)
- Megan Whalen Turner (born 1965), author of The Thief
- Harry Turtledove (born 1949), author of the Videssos series and Darkness series

== U ==
- Unno Juza (1897–1949)

== V ==
- Eric van Lustbader (born 1946), author of The Pearl Saga
- Jack Vance (1916–2013) (John Holbrook Vance), author of the Dying Earth series and the Lyonesse Trilogy
- Jules Verne (1828–1905), author of Around the World in Eighty Days and Twenty Thousand Leagues Under the Seas
- E. C. Vivian (1882–1947)

== W ==
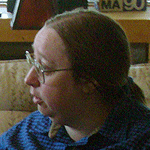
Jo Walton

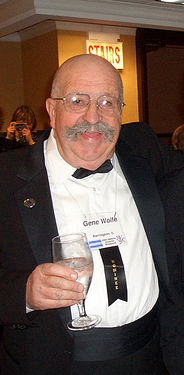
Gene Wolfe

- Tim Waggoner, author of Thieves of Blood
- Karl Edward Wagner (1945–1994), author of Kane
- Mervyn Wall (1908–1997), author of The Unfortunate Fursey
- Evangeline Walton (1907–1996), author of Prince of Annwn
- Jo Walton (born 1964), author of Among Others
- Freda Warrington, author of Elfland, A Taste of Blood Wine, the Blackbird sequence, Dracula the Undead, Dark Cathedral, and others
- Lawrence Watt-Evans (born 1954), author of Out of This World
- Catherine Webb (born 1986), author of Mirror Dreams
- David Weber (born 1952), author of Oath of Swords
- Helene Wecker, author of The Golem and the Jinni
- Brent Weeks (born 1977), author of The Way of Shadows
- Margaret Weis (born 1948) co-author of several Dragonlance books
- Manly Wade Wellman (1903–1986), author of Worse Things Waiting
- Angus Wells (1943–2006), author of Forbidden Magic
- Martha Wells (born 1964), author of City of Bones and The Books of the Raksura
- Django Wexler, author of The Shadow Campaigns
- Suzanne Weyn (born 1955), author of children's and young adult science fiction and fantasy novels and numerous film novelizations
- Chuck Whelon (born 1969) cartoonist and creator of the humorous fantasy webcomic serial "Pewfell"
- E. B. White (1899–1985), author of Charlotte's Web and Stuart Little
- T.H. White (1906–1964) (Terence Hanbury White), author of The Once and Future King
- Jack Whyte (1940–2021), author of Arthurian novels such as The Skystone
- Cherry Wilder (1930–2002), author of The Wanderer
- Paul O. Williams (1935–2009)
- Tad Williams (born 1957), author of the Memory, Sorrow, and Thorn trilogy
- Terri Windling (born 1958), author of the Borderland series
- David Wingrove, author of Chung Kuo
- Evan Winter, author of The Rage of Dragons
- Cendrine Wolf, author of Oksa Pollock
- Gene Wolfe (1931–2019), author of The Shadow of the Torturer
- Chris Wooding, author of Poison
- Patricia Wrede, author of the Lyra books
- John C. Wright (born 1961), author of the Orphans of Chaos and Last Guardian of Everness series
- Kirby Wright, author of The End, My Friend
- Janny Wurts, author of the Wars of Light and Shadow and the Empire Trilogy (with Raymond E. Feist)

== Y ==
- Yamamura Bochō
- Neon Yang, author of The Black Tides of Heaven
- Nicholas Yermakov (original name of Simon Hawke; born 1951)
- Jane Yolen (1939–2026), author of Briar Rose

== Z ==
- Roger Zelazny (1937–1995), author of The Chronicles of Amber
- Alexander Zelenyj
- Sarah Zettel (born 1966), author of A Sorcerer's Treason

== See also ==
- Fantasy
- List of children's literature writers
- List of fantasy novels
- List of high fantasy fiction
- List of horror fiction authors
- List of science fiction authors
- Lists of authors
