= Stellar Occasion =

Science fiction convention

- Status: Inactive
- Genre: Science fiction
- Locations: Dallas, Texas
- Country: United States
- Inaugurated: 1994
- Most recent: 1998
- Organizer: Phoenix Entertainment
- Filing status: For Profit
- Website: Phoenix Entertainment official site

Stellar Occasion was a three-day science fiction convention held in the Dallas, Texas area in the mid to late 1990s. It blended science fiction literary and media guests with space science in an unusual, fan-oriented cross between the traditional science fiction convention and a commercial media event. Stellar Occasion is notable for being an early proponent of the television series Babylon 5 and featuring both writers and actors from the show each year.

== Conventions ==
=== Stellar Occasion – 1994 ===
The first Stellar Occasion was held October 22–23, 1994, at the Executive Hotel located at 3252 W. Mockingbird Lane near Love Field in Dallas. Featured guests included Babylon 5 creator J. Michael Straczynski, Babylon 5 actress Claudia Christian, writer D. C. Fontana, and author G. Harry Stine. Programming included a video room, panel discussions, open fan club meetings, a writer's workshop led by Straczynski, and a dealers room.

=== Stellar Occasion 2 – 1995 ===
Stellar Occasion 2 (also called "Another Stellar Occasion") was held September 22–24, 1995, at the Harvey Hotel-Downtown located in the Southland Center, 400 N. Olive at Live Oak, in Dallas. Notable guests included Media GoH Jerry Doyle of Babylon 5, Art GoH Keith Birdsong, author Martha Wells, author P.N. Elrod, special guest Mark Elrod, and Special GoH Frank Conniff of Mystery Science Theater 3000. Writer and noted Star Trek fan Bjo Trimble was scheduled to attend but had to withdraw for health reasons. Programming included a dealers room, panels, Q&A sessions, autograph sessions, children's programming, costume contest, a Friday night guest reception, a Saturday night dance, gaming, art gallery, art auctions, fan areas, and a scavenger hunt.

=== Stellar Occasion 3 – 1996 ===
Stellar Occasion 3 was held December 27–29, 1996, at the Harvey Hotel-Addison in Addison, Texas. Guests included Artist GoH Alan Gutierrez, Author GoH P. N. Elrod, Master of Ceremonies Myhr, author Roxanne Longstreet, and "Starlog" creator Kerry O'Quinn. The media guests of honor included actors Ed Wasser of Babylon 5, Robert Trebor of Hercules: The Legendary Journeys and Xena: Warrior Princess, and Walter Koenig of Babylon 5 and Star Trek. Proceeds from certain special events benefitted Golden Heart Children's Charities. Notable programming included a Saturday afternoon private reception with Robert Trebor, a dealers room, autograph sessions, Saturday night masquerade, charity auction, gaming, LARPs, a model contest, live rocket engine firings, and fan club presentations.

=== Stellar Occasion 4 – 1997 ===
Stellar Occasion 4 was held August 1–3, 1997, at the Harvey Hotel-Addison in Addison, Texas. Featured guests included Mira Furlan of Babylon 5, artist Teresa Patterson, designer Syd Mead, and authors Peter David and Ben Bova. Other program participants included the Prometheus Stunt Team, author Thomas K. Martin, writer Steven L. Sears, and Celtic musical group Ravens. Notable programming included panel discussions, question and answer sessions, concerts, a costume contest, a Saturday night dance, and screening of the Space Cases blooper reels.

=== Stellar Occasion 5 – 1998 ===
Stellar Occasion 5 was held September 18–20, 1998, at the Sheraton Dallas-Brookhollow in Dallas. Guests included actors Stephen Furst and Ed Wasser of Babylon 5, noted fan Newton Ewell, actress Anne Lockhart of the original Battlestar Galactica, artist Brian Stelfreeze, author P. N. Elrod, and Artist GoH Mitchell Bentley. Notable programming included panels, Q&A sessions, a costume contest, and a sneak preview of scenes from the movie Baby Huey's Great Easter Adventure by director Stephen Furst.

== Hiatus and beyond ==
On April 20, 1999, an announcement appeared on the Stellar Occasion homepage stating: "We would like to thank everyone that has attended our shows. For right now we are putting Stellar on hiatus until further notice. Thanks to you all." While there have been a few Itzacon events, the most notable a last-minute replacement for the unexpected November 2001 failure of UncommonCon 2, and Phoenix Entertainment's signature anime convention A-Kon continues to grow each year, as of September 2011 there is no sign that Stellar Occasion will ever return.
