= Raven Oak =

American author (born 1977)

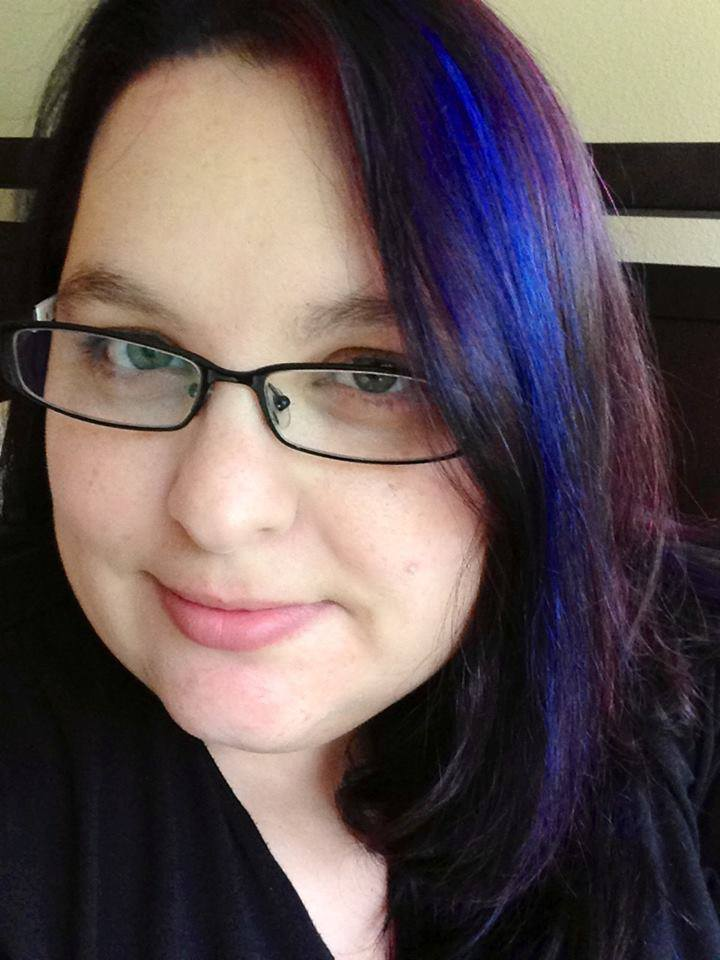
- Oak in 2013
- Born: December 21, 1977 (age 48)
- Education: B.S., 2001; M.S., 2005
- Alma mater: University of North Texas
- Occupations: Writer, musician
- Spouse: Molligru Oak (1996–present)
- Writing career
- Period: 2000s–present
- Genres: Fantasy, science fiction, dark fantasy
- Website: ravenoak.net

Raven Oak (born December 21, 1977) is an American author and artist whose written works range from science fiction & fantasy to cross-genre. She is most known for her bestselling epic fantasy, Amaskan's Blood, and her space operas, Class-M Exile and The Eldest Silence. She wrote her first novel, a 320-page fantasy work at age twelve. She is a member of the LGBTQ+ community and is disabled from both a birth defect in the lower spine and an auto-immune disease. She is also a pianist and songwriter, whose musical works deal with the survival side of life. Currently residing in Seattle, Washington, Oak is currently focusing on writing and art full-time.

== Early life ==
Oak grew up in many places around the U.S. including California, Michigan, Oklahoma, Florida, and Texas, where she eventually attended Richland College and later the University of North Texas as a music major. A military child, her family moved frequently until they settled in Texas in 1989. Her maternal grandmother was a public school teacher in California and under her tutelage, Oak was reading and writing at age three.

Oak knew "since the age of five" that she "wanted to be a writer," a wish that never changed through the years. "They said I could be anything, do anything. So I did!"

After high school, the rest of the family moved out of state, but Oak remained in North Texas to attend college and received both her Bachelor of Science Degree and Master of Science Degree in CECS from UNT.

== Writing career ==
=== Early writings ===
Oak has written stories for as long as she can remember, and before that, she was telling them. She wrote her first novel, "The Cry of the Dragon" at age twelve. The novel was heavily influenced by Anne McCaffrey's Pern novels. Before that, she wrote a children's novel titled "The Fish and the Lion," which was published as part of a case study on childhood literacy for the University of Florida.

She spent middle and high school "devouring all the science fiction and fantasy novels" she could find, and her writing shifted towards the authors who influenced her most: Neil Gaiman and Connie Willis. Oak was the vice president of her high school's "Writer's Guild," a club for aspiring writers. Its faculty adviser was author Linda L. Donahue (writer of The Four Redheads of the Apocalypse), who mentored Oak on writing and invited her to join a local writers' critique group. While Oak learned how to critique, she struggled with finding her own voice. It wasn't until her late twenties that she felt her craft was up to par.

=== Professional writing ===
In the winter of 2012, Oak retired from teaching computers and moved to Seattle, Washington, to pursue her full-time writing career. As part of Magnolia Chapter One, she has authored several articles on the craft of writing and writing life. In 2018, she became an active member of the Science Fiction and Fantasy Writers Association. She is also a member of several PNW writing groups.

Her first fantasy novel, Amaskan's Blood, was published in January 2015 by a small publisher, Grey Sun Press, and was followed up in 2018 by its sequel, Amaskan's War. Oak also hinted in a 2015 interview at a standalone novel featuring the character Ida Warhammer from Amaskan's Blood. Class-M Exile, a science fiction novella, was released in June 2015. The Eldest Silence, which takes place in the same universe as Class-M Exile, will be released in 2023. Two stories, "The Ringers" and "Ol' St. Nick", were released in a mystery/speculative fiction collection with mystery author, Maia Chance, award-winning science fiction author Janine Southard, and fantasy author Gayle Clemans. The collection, entitled Joy to the Worlds: Mysterious Speculative Fiction for the Holidays was accompanied by a book tour with the four authors. Her short story "Q-Be" was published on October 1, 2016, in Untethered: A Magic iPhone Anthology by Cantina Publishing. The anthology is based on the book Cracked: A Magic iPhone Story which is set in Seattle, Washington and features gamers who find a magic iPhone. Her short story "Mirror Me" was published on October 15, 2016, in Magic Unveiled: An Anthology by Creative Alchemy, Inc. and later as a reprint in Issue 0 of Mercedes Lackey's Fantasy Quarterly Magazine. Three connected short stories from the Boahim Series were published in consecutive anthologies (Hidden Magic, Wayward Magic, and Forgotten Magic) by Magical Mayhem Press, and featured fan-favourite character, Ida, from Amaskan's Blood.

Oak's tie-in short story, "Scout's Honor", was published in 2020 as part of a Kickstarter project by PNW artist, Jeff Sturgeon, entitled The Last Cities of Earth. The anthology was picked up by Kevin J. Anderson's WordFire Press and republished in January 2022. The stories take place on a post-apocalyptic Earth after the eruption of Yellowstone, as seen in Jeff Sturgeon's artwork. The anthology also includes stories by Jody Lynn Nye, Kevin J. Anderson, Brenda Cooper, David Gerrold, and others. Her short story, "Weightless," was published in The Great Beyond Anthology in 2020 and focuses on the ableist focus of space travel. It was later reprinted in Soul Jar: Thirty-one Fantastical Tales by Disabled Authors. Her story "Learning to Fly," was to be published in the It Has Pockets Anthology by Clockwork Dragon but the anthology was cancelled when one of the co-editors died in 2021. Queer Sci-Fi's Ninth Annual Flash Fiction Contest Anthology featured Oak's story "Wrinkled," in 2022, where it picked up an "Honorable Mention."

"Eye of the Beholder," co-written with author Jennifer Brozek, was published in Gen Con's Writer Symposium Anthology entitled Interdimensions (ISBN 978-1-961654-18-1) in 2024 from Atthis Arts. A special edition was available at the convention itself, followed by a trade publication version.

"The Things We Do for Love during the Apocalypse" was published in Adversity & Audacity: SF & F from Cancer Survivors (ISBN 978-1-951391-70-6) in 2025 from Paper Golem LLC. The book features stories from speculative fiction authors who were or are battling cancer and began as a Kickstarter before being printed worldwide in 2026.

Her "Flashback Friday," column focuses on science-fiction or fantasy novels that influenced writers, and has featured authors J. L. Forrest, Django Wexler, and best-selling author, Veronica Scott. An avid gamer since the days of the NES and GEnie, she reviews various tabletop games in her weekly column, "Monday Night Gaming." She also contributed a short essay in Ursula K. Le Guin: A Brief Tribute

==== The Boahim Trilogy ====
In Amaskan's Blood, Book I of the Boahim Trilogy, the heroine of the novel is an Amaskan, one of Boahim's assassins tasked with ensuring justice across the Little Dozen Kingdoms. In the land of Boahim, Amaskan's are holy assassins and feel they work for the greater good. When asked about this in a 2015 interview, Oak said, "They truly believe they are serving justice and the greater good. They feel certain people should die because they are...murderers or rapists...Adelei learns the hard way that it's not always that simple."

Over the course of the novel, she discovers that her past is a lie. She can trust no one, not even her family. Despite her training and struggles, she fights to see justice through to the end. It's been called her most personal novel to date as it was heavily influenced by her own reconnection with her estranged mother. "It has a coming-of-age arc of typical epic fantasy, with the seedy underbelly of what makes a family and what makes us believe as we do."

Amaskan's Blood was a 2016 EPIC Award Finalist and became an Amazon bestselling fantasy on February 19, 2015, a little over a month after its release. Book Digits called Amaskan's Blood "an epic fantasy filled with intrigue and layers upon layers of well-crafted secrets and lies" and gave it a grade of A. It was also a 2016 Ozma Fantasy Award winner and a 2019 Readers' Favorite Bronze Award Winner for YA Epic Fantasy.

The trilogy continues with Book II, Amaskan's War, published on August 1, 2018, was a finalist in the UK Wishing Shelf Book Awards for Best Young Adult Book. The trilogy finishes with Book III, Amaskan's Honor, publishing on September 16, 2025. A stand-alone book entitled Ear to Ear: The Collected Stories of an Amaskan will be published in 2026.

==== Class-M Exile ====
Class-M Exile is a space opera novella, also through Grey Sun Press. The novella focuses on society's fear of the unknown, and the prejudices societies carry. In a discussion on the Hugo nominated Skiffy & Fanty Show, Oak said, "Some of the same diversity issues we're dealing with now across the United States are themes in this novella."

The story began during a Locus Writers' Workshop when Oak was asked to think of an event that impacted her emotionally as a child. Oak picked a memory of when a new student arrived at her small Texas town middle school. In a recent interview at the Seattle Comedy Group after-party, Oak said, "She was everything not Texas...and everyone was trying to stampede away from [her] like she had the plague. It bothered me that no one wanted to know her, so of course I made her my best friend."

The main character—a four-eyed, three-legged alien with a fake Texas drawl—has spent his life researching humans. "[Eerl's] never seen one, never met one, because they don't really exist anymore. And then he meets one." The story follows Eerl in his quest to find out what a fish is while defending Mel (a human) from the prejudice of the universe.

Class-M Exile was a Top 100 Hot New Release on Amazon UK and ranked as an Amazon US bestseller in space opera on June 24, 2015. In an interview with the author, members of the podcast SciFi Diner said, "[Class-M Exile] really does do what [Star] Trek does, in that it functions well in social commentary. If you like science fiction that really deals with social commentary...you need to check this book out! You need to put this author on your radar."

==== Joy to the Worlds ====
Joy to the Worlds: Mysterious Speculative Fiction for the Holidays was named a 2015 Foreword Review Book of the Year Award finalist and was listed in the Seattle Times as a #1 Bestselling paperback locally. The book was also a #1 Hot New Release in Amazon Sci-Fi Anthologies and a Top 100 Bestseller in Amazon Holiday Stories.

==== From the Worlds of Raven Oak ====
From the Worlds of Raven Oak is an art book illustrated and written by Oak, featuring scenes, characters, and settings from her various novels and short stories.

==== Voices Carry ====
In 2024, Oak released a non-fiction memoir entitled Voices Carry: A Story of Teaching, Transitions, & Truths which focused on her life growing up, teaching, and writing as a disabled, non-binary queer in Texas. Taking its name from the song by 'Til Tuesday, the book explores themes of discrimination and self-identity, mostly through the lens of a former educator. The song Voices Carry was instrumental in alerting Raven Oak that her childhood was not normal, something she wrote about both in the book and in The Big Idea, a blog series hosted by fellow science fiction writer John Scalzi.

=== Adaptations ===
In August 2016, Class-M Exile made it to the stage as part of the Seattle Literary Festival Bibliophilia. This three-day festival, run by improv-actor, writer, and editor, Jekeva Phillips, "combines... theatre and literature into a cross-disciplinary storytelling celebration." Oak began the festival by reading chapter one from Class-M Exile on opening night. The reading was followed by a re-enactment of the story by a local improv troupe, CSz Seattle.

== Music career ==
While Oak continued writing novels throughout college, she began her university studies as a music composition and theory major, her primary instrument is the piano. A piano player since the age of five, she was gifted with the ability to play by ear. Her ability to learn instruments quickly gained her the spot of 1st chair in her middle school's top band just two months after joining the beginning band. She was also named 1st chair in the All-Region Honor Band.

She found the University of North Texas music program stiffing as she did not fit into its jazz or opera style. In 2001, she changed majors to CECS and released her first CD, Walls, Boxes, & Jars. The CD's sales donated to RAINN, the Rape, Abuse, and Incest National Network. RAINN, founded by musician Tori Amos, is America's only national hotline for rape and abuse. Through her lengthy support and advocacy of RAINN, Oak was listed as a corporate partner of the non-profit organization.

Of Oak's music, Score! Music says: "Perfectly stunning musical compositions that, though they lack vocals, do not lack in emotional impact; it’s as though one can venture inside Oak’s being through her beautiful piano work. Think Tori Amos unplugged and without lyrics." Splendid Magazine says, "...Oak transcends the damning excesses of the Lilith Fair ghetto...if it's the job of a musician to tell stories through her instruments, Raven Oak does her job exceedingly well."

Her music career is currently on hiatus with an unknown release date for her second album, titled "Fight or Flight."

== Awards for Oak's Writing ==
Year	Title	Award	Result	Ref.
2015	Joy to the Worlds: Mysterious Speculative Fiction for the Holidays	Foreword Reviews for Book of the Year	Finalist	
2016	Amaskan's Blood	Ozma Fantasy Award for Best Fantasy Novel	Winner	
2016	Amaskan's Blood	EPIC eBook Awards for Best Fantasy Novel	Finalist	
2018	Amaskan's War	Wishing Shelf Book Awards for Best YA Novel	Finalist	
2019	Amaskan's Blood	Readers' Favorite for Best Fantasy Novel	Winner	
2023	Dragon Springs & Other Things	Wishing Shelf Award for Best Novel	Finalist	

== Bibliography ==
=== Published novels ===
1. —— (2015). Amaskan's Blood (paperback 1st ed.). Grey Sun Press. pp. 1–440. ISBN 978-0990815709.
2. —— (2018). Amaskan's War (paperback 1st ed.). Grey Sun Press. pp. 1–458. ISBN 978-0990815716.
3. —— (2025). Amaskan's Honor (paperback 1st ed.). Grey Sun Press. p. 428. ISBN 9781947712188.
4. —— (2015). Class-M Exile (paperback ed.). Grey Sun Press. pp. 1–102. ISBN 978-0990815747.
5. —— (2021). Ol' St. Nick (ebook ed.). Grey Sun Press. ISBN 978-1947712003.
6. —— (2021). The Ringers (ebook ed.). Grey Sun Press. ISBN 978-1947712027.

=== Coloring books ===
1. —— (2018). From the Worlds of Raven Oak: Coloring Book (paperback 1st ed.). Grey Sun Press. pp. 1–56. ISBN 978-0990815792.

=== Collections ===
1. (2023). Dragon Springs & Other Things. Grey Sun Press. pp. 1–206. ISBN 978-1947712041
2. (2023). Space Ships & Other Trips. Grey Sun Press. pp. 1–186. ISBN 978-1947712089
3. —— (2001). Fading. S.T. Publications. ISBN 0-9712833-0-3.
4. ——; Chance, Maia; Gayle, Clemans; Southard, Janine A. (2015). Joy to the Worlds (paperback ed.). Grey Sun Press. pp. 1–296. ISBN 978-0990815761.

=== Short stories ===
1. "Q-Be" in Untethered: A Magic iPhone Anthology (October 2016, ISBN 978-1-6332702-2-0)
2. "Mirror Me" in Magic Unveiled: An Anthology (October 2016, ISBN 978-13706424-7-2)
3. "Hungry" (Stand Alone Story) (December 2016, ISBN 978-0-9908157-8-5)
4. "Alive" in Swords, Sorcery, & Self-Rescuing Damsels (April 2019, ISBN 978-19443342-6-0)
5. "Amaskan" in Hidden Magic: Magic Underground Anthology Book 1 (March 2020, ISBN 978-19491451-6-8)
6. "Pretty Poison" in Wayward Magic: Magic Underground Anthology Book 2 (April 2020, ISBN 978-19491451-7-5)
7. "Honor After All" in Forgotten Magic: Magic Underground Anthology Book 3 (May 2020, ISBN 978-19491451-8-2)
8. "Weightless" in The Great Beyond Anthology (June 2020, ISBN 979-86527319-7-7) BDL Press.
9. "Drip" in 99 Tiny Terrors (2021, ISBN 978-1950701032).
10. "Scout's Honor" in The Last Cities of Earth Anthology (January 2022, ISBN 978-16805725-3-7)
11. "Learning to Fly" in It Has Pockets Anthology (2021).
12. "Wrinkled" in Queer Sci-Fi's 9th Annual Flash Fiction Contest Anthology (2022, ISBN 978-1955778466)
13. "Weightless" 2nd Ed. in Soul Jar: Thirty-One Fantastical Tales by Disabled Authors (2023, ISBN 978-1942436584)
14. "Not Today" in 99 Fleeting Fantasies (2024, ISBN 978-1950701070)
15. "Eye of the Beholder" in Interdimensions: Stories from the Gen Con Writers' Symposium (2024, ISBN 978-1961654198)
16. "The Things We Do for Love during the Apocalypse" in Adversity & Audacity: SF & F from Cancer Survivors (2026, ISBN 978-1951391713))

=== Non-Fiction ===
1. Short Essay in Ursula K. Le Guin: A Brief Tribute (August 2018)
2. (2024). Voices Carry: A Story of Teaching, Transitions, & Truths. Grey Sun Press. pp. 1–310. ISBN 978-1947712225

=== Forthcoming ===
- —— (2026). Ear to Ear (paperback 1st ed.). Grey Sun Press. ISBN 9781947712164.
- —— (2026). The Eldest Silence (paperback 1st ed.). Grey Sun Press.

== Discography ==
Shaded Tree Records

- Walls, Boxes, & Jars
- Fight or Flight (unknown release date)

== See also ==
- List of fantasy authors
- List of science fiction authors
