= Alison Spedding =

British anthropologist

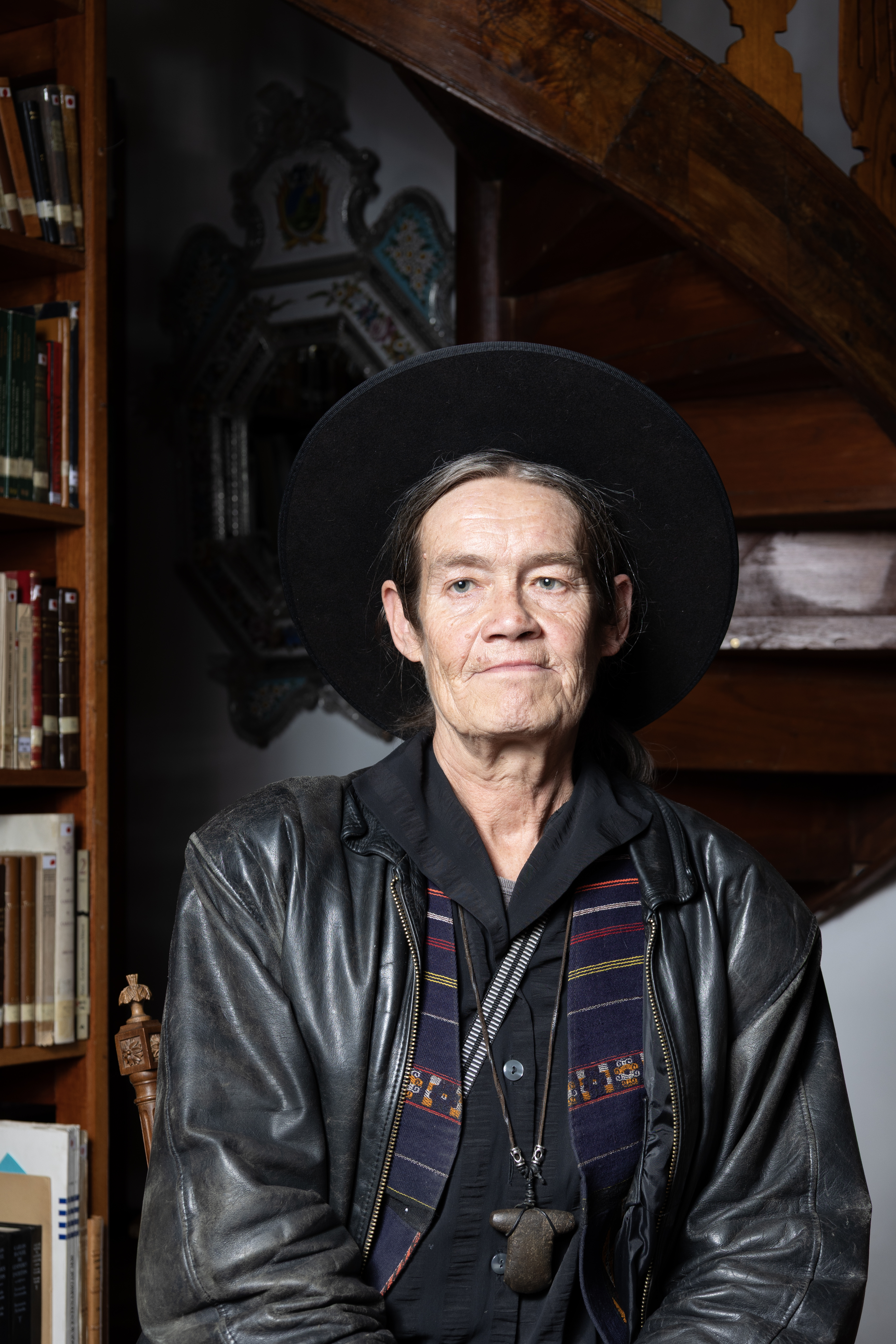
- Born: January 22, 1962 (age 64); Belper, United Kingdom
- Other names: Alicia Céspedes Ballet
- Occupations: Anthropologist; fantasy author

Alison Louise Spedding (born 22 January 1962) is a British anthropologist and fantasy author, latterly also known as Alison Spedding Pallet.

== Education and writing ==
Alison Spedding is the daughter of Ken Spedding and Maureen Reybould. She was brought up in Maidenhead and Reading. She studied archaeology and anthropology and later philosophy at King's College, Cambridge, receiving her BA degree in 1982. She received a PhD from the London School of Economics in 1989.

She wrote a trilogy of fantasy novels, A Walk in the Dark, set approximately in the time of Alexander the Great. In the novels, Alexander dies, and the female protagonist, Aleizon Ailix Ayndra, goes on to fulfil Alexander's destiny.

== Bolivia ==
In 1988, Spedding moved to Bolivia, securing permanent residence in 1989. She lectured at the Higher University of San Andrés in La Paz. She became fluent in Spanish and Aymara. She published the academic work Wachu Wachu. Cultivo de coca e identidad en los Yungas de la Paz in 1994. She wrote a book of short stories, El tiempo, la distancia, otros amantes (1994), and a novel in Spanish, Manuel y Fortunato. Una picaresca andina, published in 1997.

Spedding became an outspoken critic of the Bolivian government's policy, under pressure from the US, of "cracking down" on peasant coca farmers. In May 1998 her La Paz flat was raided and 2kg of marijuana was found; she was arrested on charges of possession of intent to traffic, and sentenced provisionally to ten years in prison. Academics widely considered the arrest was politically motivated and campaigned for her release; she was released in 2000 on payment of a surety, and the sentence, which had never reach final status, was quashed by Bolivia's Constitutional Court after she had served 26 months.

She went on to publish three further novels in Spanish, El viento de la cordillera (2001), the science fiction, anarcho-feminist, novel De cuando en cuando Saturnina (2004), and Catre de fierro in 2015. She also had a play, Un gato en el tejar, published under the pseudonym Alicia Céspedes Ballet, and published further academic works, Kausachun-Coca (2004) and Religión en los Andes: Extirpación de idolatrías y modernidad de la fe andina (2008), under her own name.

As of 2022, Spedding was still living in Bolivia, an active member of an association of coca farmers, and teaching at the Universidad Mayor de San Andrés.

== Bibliography ==
=== A Walk in the Dark trilogy ===
- The Road and the Hills (1986)
- A Cloud over Water (1988)
- The Streets of the City (1988)

=== Novels in Spanish ===
- Manuel y Fortunato; una picaresca andina publicada (1997)
- El viento de la cordillera: un thriller de los 80 (2001)
- De cuando en cuando Saturnina; una historia oral del futuro (2004)
- Catre de fierro (2015)

=== Short fiction ===
- El tiempo, la distancia, otros amantes (1994)

=== Drama ===
- Un gato en el tejar

=== Academic works ===
- Wachu Wachu. Cultivo de coca e identidad en los Yungas de la Paz (1994)
- Kausachun-Coca. Economía campesina cocalera en los Yungas y el Chapare. Programa de Investigación Estratégica en Bolivia (2004)
- Religión en los Andes. Extirpación de idolatrías y modernidad de la fe andina. (2008)
