= Sharon Skinner =

American author, poet and recording artist

- Born: December 21, 1956 (age 69); Buffalo, New York, U.S.
- Occupation: Author
- Partner: Robert “Bob” Nelson
- Writing career
- Genres: fantasy, science fiction, literary fiction, poetry
- Website: sharonskinner.com

Sharon Skinner (born December 21, 1956) is an American author, poet and recording artist. Born in Buffalo, New York, she grew up in Winters, California and lives in Mesa, Arizona.

== Biography ==
=== Early life ===
Skinner began writing stories in the fourth grade at which time she decided she wanted to be a writer when she grew up. At 23 years old, Skinner joined the United States Navy, eventually serving on the USS Jason (AR-8) stationed at Diego Garcia in the Indian Ocean during the Iran hostage crisis in 1980. Skinner graduated from Mesa Community College with an associate degree, graduated from Ottawa University with a bachelor's degree in English language and literature/letters and Prescott College with a masters in creative writing.

=== Career ===
From 1996 to 2004, while still in college, Skinner served as executive editor for Anthology literary magazine.

Soon after graduating, Skinner devoted her time to writing. In 2000, Skinner was the founder and host of the Radiant Readings internet radio show as part of the original NetRadioLive internet radio network. The show featured Skinner reading the works of various authors and writers. She also began writing grants professionally during this time in addition to writing poetry and novels. Nine years later, She joined the Grant Professionals Association National Board, eventually serving as board president of the organization. She is certified as a GPC Grant Professional.

In addition to joining the Grant Professionals Association National Board in 2009, Skinner worked on the feature film Sacrifice, contributing writing to the script and costuming for the film. One year later her first published book, the poetry collection In Case You Didn’t Hear Me the First Time, was published by Brick Cave Books, and in 2011, Skinner would work on the Brick Cave Films short film Yellowstone Sunset.

Skinner's resume as an event guest begins in 2013 at Phoenix Comicon One year later Skinner was a guest at Emerald City Comicon presenting panels, including discussions of Women in Fiction and Writing Female Fictional Characters. Then, in 2015, Skinner was a guest of the Comic & Media Expo (CMX) in Mesa, AZ. In 2016 and 2017, Skinner was a Presenter San Francisco Comic Con. In 2020, Skinner expanded her horizons and created her own book coaching business.

In addition to her appearances at these events, in 2017 Skinner served as the Arizona Writer in Residence for the Scottsdale, Arizona Library System. In 2018, Skinner was named an Arizona Writer in Residence for the Mesa, Arizona Library System. In addition to this, Skinner serves as the Arizona Regional Advisor for the Society of Children's Book Writers and Illustrators.

== Bibliography ==
Picture Books

- Rocket Shoes (2017, Sterling Children's Books- imprint of Sterling Publishing)

Novels

- Collars and Curses (2017, Brick Cave Books- imprint of Brick Cave Media)
- The Martiarch’s Devise (2015, Brick Cave Books)
- Mirabella and the Faded Phantom (2014, Brick Cave Books)
- The Nelig Stones (2013, Brick Cave Books)
- The Healer’s Legacy (2012, Brick Cave Books)

Collections

- Futurewords: A Brick Cave Anthology (2017, Brick Cave Books)
- The Stories of Haven: I (2010, Brick Cave Books)

Poetry

- In Case You Didn’t Hear Me the First Time (2010, Brick Cave Books)

eBooks

- The Sounds of Time: The Chronicles of Tavara Tinker, Book 2 (2016, Brick Cave Books)
- LeTour de Paris: The Chronicles of Tavara Tinker Book 1 (2015, Brick Cave Books)
- Ada’s Wish (2010, Brick Cave Books)
- Coffee and Cues (2010, Brick Cave Books)
- Urban Light (2010, Brick Cave Books)

Spoken Word Albums

- The Vultures are Circling but I'm Not Finished, Yet (2015, Brick Cave Audio)
- Sifted Gems, Polished Dreams (2012, Brick Cave Audio)

== Film credits ==
- Sacrifice (2010, Brick Cave Films)- Contributing Writer, Actor (Meda)
- Yellowstone Sunset (2012, Brick Cave Films)- Productions Design, Set Design, Actor (Computer Voice)
