= Jean-Louis Fetjaine =

French writer

Jean-Louis Fetjaine (born in 1956) is a French fantasy writer, most famous for his trilogy about elves, Merlin and Uther Pendragon. He has written a number of novels which include the elf-trilogy: "Le crepuscule de elfes" (1998), "la nuit des elfes" (1999), "L'heure des elfes" (2000) and the Merlin-Cycle consisting of two volumes: "Le Pas de Merlin" (2002) and "Brocéliande" (2004).
