= Thomas K. Martin =

American fantasy author (born 1960)

Thomas Kieth Martin
- Born: September 25, 1960 (age 65); Middlesboro, Kentucky
- Occupation: Fantasy author
- Writing career
- Period: 1992–present

Thomas Kieth Martin (born Middlesboro, Kentucky, September 25, 1960) is an American fantasy author.

== Books ==
=== The Delgroth Trilogy ===
- A Two-Edged Sword (1994) ISBN 0-441-83344-6
- A Matter of Honor (1994) ISBN 0-441-00107-6
- A Call to Arms (1995) ISBN 0-441-00242-0

=== Magelord Trilogy ===
- Magelord: The Awakening (1997) ISBN 0-441-00435-0
- Magelord: The Time of Madness (1998) ISBN 0-441-00533-0
- Magelord: The House of Bairn (1999) ISBN 0-441-00623-X
