= The Last Descendants =

The Last Descendants is a series of fantasy novels for young adults written by British author Catherine Banner and published by Random House. The series started with a single book Catherine started writing when she was 14 years old and still a student. The first book, The Eyes of a King, became the first part of the series The Last Descendants. The second book, Voices in the Dark, was published in 2009. The third and last book, The Heart at War, was published in May 2015.

== Novels ==
1. 2008 - The Eyes of a King
2. 2009 - Voices in the Dark
3. 2015 - The Heart at War

== Plot summary ==
The books tell a story of a boy (Leo North) living in Malonia. He attends military school, lives with his fearful grandmother, and looks after his brother Stirling. He resists his innate powers, because those who demonstrate any sort of magical ability are considered enemies of the state.

One day Leo finds a strange, blank book. Empty pages start to fill with passages though, revealing family secrets, telling the history of Malonia, and uncovering the story of Ryan and Anna, two teens in a parallel universe in modern times England.

When Leo's seemingly narrow path takes an unexpected tragic turn, he finds himself on a journey from which he can never really return. And, as he slowly begins to lose touch with reality, Ryan and Anna's story comes to the forefront.
