= Catherine Banner =

British author

- Born: 22 April 1989 (age 37); Cambridge, United Kingdom
- Occupation: Author
- Writing career
- Notable work: The Eyes of a King
- Website: www.catherine-banner.com

Catherine Banner (born 22 April 1989) is a British author, born in Cambridge, England and living in Turin, Italy. She gained international attention with her first book, The Eyes of a King, which she began writing when she was fourteen and still a school student. She attended Coleridge Community College and Hills Road Sixth Form College.

Banner studied English at Fitzwilliam College, Cambridge, before moving to County Durham where she worked as a secondary school teacher. She has published a trilogy of young adult novels, The Last Descendants. Her debut adult novel, The House at the Edge of Night, was published in 2016. Her work is translated into 22 languages. She lives in Turin, Italy, with her husband.

== Bibliography ==
=== The Last Descendants ===
- 2008 - Eyes of a King
- 2009 - Voices in the Dark
- 2015 - The Heart at War

=== Other novels ===
- The House at the Edge of Night (2016)
