= Roger Taylor (author) =

English writer (1938–2023)

Roger Standring Taylor (15 March 1938 – 25 March 2023) was an English fiction and non-fiction author.

== Background ==
Roger Standring Taylor was born in Heywood, Lancashire, on 15 March 1938. He was a chartered civil and structural engineer, a pistol, rifle and shotgun shooter, aikido instructor/student, and an enthusiastic piano player. Taylor lived on the Wirral at the time of his death on 25 March 2023, aged 85.

== Career ==
Taylor was the author of 13 epic fantasy novels and a book on martial arts philosophy. The first four books are collectively known as the Chronicles of Hawklan, the following seven are set in the same world following the events in the Chronicles, and the twelfth, 'The Return of the Sword', is the culmination of the series. They were published originally by Headline Book Publishing Ltd between 1988 and 1999. The thirteenth book, 'The Keep', was published in January 2012 and is unrelated to the others.

All the books are currently published as ebooks by Mushroom eBooks, and are also available as paperbacks from Bladud Books. His book 'Aikido – more than a martial art' was published by Atlantic Leisure Ltd in 1999 and is now available in a Kindle version (2011).

== Bibliography ==
- Chronicles of Hawklan
  - I The Call of the Sword (1988) (ISBN 1-84319-078-8)
  - II The Fall of Fyorlund (1989) (ISBN 1-84319-111-3)
  - III The Waking of Orthlund (1989) (ISBN 1-84319-139-3)
  - IV Into Narsindal (1990) (ISBN 1-84319-147-4)
  - V The Return of the Sword (1999) (ISBN 1-84319-240-3)
- Dream Finder (1991) (ISBN 1-84319-155-5)
- (Nightfall 1 ) Farnor (1992) (ISBN 1-84319-179-2)
- (Nightfall 2) Valderen (1993) (ISBN 1-84319-189-X)
- Whistler (1994) (ISBN 1-84319-197-0)
- Ibryen (1995)(ISBN 1-84319-216-0)
- Arash-Felloren (1996) (ISBN 1-84319-224-1)
- Caddoran (1998) (ISBN 1-84319-232-2)
- The Keep
- Aikido - more than a martial art
- Newman (2022) (ISBN 9781843199724)
