= Alexandra Adornetto =

Australian actress and author

- Born: Melbourne, Victoria, Australia
- Occupation: Writer
- Writing career
- Genres: Children's novels, Young adult novels, Fantasy
- Notable work: Halo
- Website: Alexandra Adornetto

Alexandra Adornetto is an Australian actress and author who writes for children and young adults. Her works include The Strangest Adventures series, the Halo trilogy and The Ghost House Saga.

== Publications ==
- The Shadow Thief (2007)
- The Lampo Circus (2008)
- Von Gobstopper's Arcade (2009)
- Halo (2010)
- Hades (2011)
- Heaven (2012)
- Ghost House (2014)

=== The Strangest Adventures ===
This fantasy adventures series has a theme of threat to childhood and innocence. Adornetto commented, "Childhood is just this amazing place and in my books I was trying to express my concern about childhood being eroded."

==== The Shadow Thief ====
The main characters of Shadow Thief are Millipop Klompet and Ernest Perriclof, who live in Drabville – a town whose residents suffer from having their shadows stolen by Lord Aldor, who wants to use the shadows to become immortal, all-powerful and rule the world. According to Adornetto, "The shadow represents individuality and colour and a person's spirit, really." The story was inspired by Peter Pan, while the two main characters were based on herself and her cousin and their own adventures together as children.

==== The Lampo Circus ====
The arrival of Federico Lampo and his traveling circus brings a new threat to Drabville when the children are kidnapped and transported to the grim world of the Conjuors' Realm. Lord Aldor‚ assisted by Ringmaster Fredrico Lampo and the vicious Contessa Bombasta (Patroness of the Arts)‚ is plotting to conquer the fairy province of Mirth.

The children embark on a quest to warn the Queen of Mirth‚ encountering obstacles‚ such as Grin Bandits and their tooth−extracting apparatus and being challenged in a life size game of Monopoly. As the day of battle draws near‚ Milli and Ernest realize that if Lord Aldor defeats them‚ theirs will not be the only lives at stake.

==== Von Gobstopper's Arcade ====
Master toymaker Gustav VonGobstopper announces plans to build a special Toy Arcade − brimming with the world's greatest toys − to commemorate the extraordinary bravery of Drabville's children who have twice escaped the clutches of the wicked Lord Aldor. But when Milli and Ernest encounter Theo‚ the bandana−wearing teddy‚ deranged designer Tempest Anamoli and the immoral Botchers at the Arcade‚ it quickly becomes apparent that they have stumbled upon a macabre plot.

=== Halo Trilogy ===
Published by Feiwel and Friends, the Halo trilogy marked Adornetto's American debut. It has also been published in Australia and sixteen European countries and has been translated into many languages, including Dutch, French, Spanish and German.

==== Halo ====
The first book, Halo, was released in August 2010. The setting is Venus Cove, a quiet, picturesque fictional town on the Georgia coastline. Three angels—the archangel Gabriel, seraphim Ivy, and junior angel Bethany—arrive on a mission to fight against the dark work of Lucifer's demons. The angels take up residence in a beach-side cottage and Bethany begins attending the local high school. She meets a human boy named Xavier with a troubled past and soon they fall in love, defying the laws of Heaven and threatening the angels' mission.

==== Hades ====
Published on 30 August 2011, Hades is the second instalment of the Halo series. Bethany is kidnapped by a demon and taken to hell.

==== Heaven ====
Heaven, the third and final instalment of the Halo series, was published on 21 August 2012. Rogue angels endanger Bethany and Xavier.

=== The Ghost House Saga ===
==== Ghost House ====
Ghost House, the first instalment of the Ghost House Saga, was published by Harlequin Teen on 26 August 2014. It was published in the UK as Lament.

After the loss of her mother, Chloe Kennedy starts seeing again the ghosts that haunted her as a young girl. Spending time at her grandmother's country estate in the south of England seemed to be her chance to get away from her grief and the spirits that haunt her. But Alexander Reade, 157 years dead, with secrets darker than the lake surrounding Grange Hall, has a lifelike presence that draws Chloe more strongly than any ghost before. The bond between them awakens the vengeful spirit of Alexander's past love, Isobel.

The projected sequels are Ghost Hour and Haunted.
