= Castle Perilous (series) =

Series of novels by John DeChancie

The Castle Perilous series is a fantasy adventure series of novels written by John DeChancie, starting with the eponymous Castle Perilous in 1988. The most recent novel, The Pirates of Perilous was published in 2015, 19 years after the previous novel, Bride of the Castle.

== Summary ==
The Castle Perilous series revolves around Castle Perilous (the name is drawn from the Siege Perilous of Arthurian fable), whose lord is Incarnadine, a sorcerer. 144,000 doors (or "aspects") of the Castle each lead to other parallel universes. Some of these dimensions are magical, while others have little or no magic; one of the latter is Earth. Those who find themselves at the Castle often stay to become Guests, and (to their surprise) develop a magical power of their own. This gift is apparently random, and can range from a minor telekinesis limited to lifting pencils to super-enhanced senses to teleportation to full conjuration of matter.

== Characters ==
- Gene Ferraro: main character, a philosophy major from Earth who gains the power of superb swordplay
- Snowclaw: a giant humanoid covered in white fur, who originally comes from a polar-like clime
- Linda Barclay: a woman from Earth who becomes a powerful sorceress
- Lord Incarnadine: sorcerer and lord of the castle
- Kwip: a lifelong thief who escaped execution by accidentally walking into the Castle through a doorway in his cell
- Cleve Dalton: a mild-mannered retiree
- Peter Thaxton: elder Englishman who is competitive in sports
- Osmirik: royal scribe and librarian of the Castle
- Sheila Jankowski: a young woman from Wilmerding, Pennsylvania who fell through an aspect of the Castle in her shower
- Jeremy Hochstader: a computer hacker
- M. DuQuesne: a French nobleman

== Novels ==
- Castle Perilous (1988)
- Castle for Rent (1989)
- Castle Kidnapped (1989)
- Castle War! (1990)
- Castle Murders (1991)
- Castle Dreams (1992)
- Castle Spellbound (1992)
- Bride of the Castle (1994)
- The Pirates of Perilous (2015)
