= William Barnwell =

American writer (born 1943)

William Barnwell (born 1943) is an American author of science fiction, and of other genres. He has written the Blessing Trilogy, set in a future Ireland, and which has metaphysical content. It was praised by Andre Norton, while Peter Nicholls stated that Barnwell wrote like "a member of a pseudoscience cult." In 1985, Barnwell wrote Book of the Romes, a prequel to the Blessing Trilogy, a historical novel with science fiction/fantasy elements.

== Partial bibliography ==
- The Blessing Papers, UK: Colin Smythe, 1979. US: Pocket Books, 1980
- Imram, Timescape Books/Pocket Books, 1981
- The Sigma Curve, Timescape/Pocket Books, 1981
- Book of the Romes, 1985
- Scheme of the Month Club, 2001
- Jubilee Account, 2019

== See also ==
- Immram
