= David Gemmell Awards for Fantasy =

Literary awards

The David Gemmell Awards for Fantasy, established in memory of David Gemmell, were awarded from 2009 to 2018. In 2009, only the Legend Award for best fantasy novel was awarded. Beginning in 2010 the Morningstar Award for best fantasy newcomer and the Ravenheart Award for best fantasy cover art were added. The award was closed in 2019.

The awards were for fantasy novels in the traditional, heroic, epic or high genres, or in the spirit of Gemmell's own work.

== Winners and nominations ==
=== 2009 ===
The 2009 award (best novel only) was presented in June 2009.

- Best novel: Andrzej Sapkowski for Blood of Elves
  - Nominated: Juliet Marillier for Heir to Sevenwaters
  - Nominated: Brandon Sanderson for The Hero of Ages
  - Nominated: Joe Abercrombie for Last Argument of Kings
  - Nominated: Brent Weeks for The Way of Shadows

=== 2010 ===
The 2010 awards were presented in June 2010.

- Best novel: Graham McNeill for Empire
  - Nominated: Joe Abercrombie for Best Served Cold
  - Nominated: Pierre Pevel for The Cardinal's Blades
  - Nominated: Robert Jordan & Brandon Sanderson for The Gathering Storm
  - Nominated: Brandon Sanderson for Warbreaker
- Best newcomer: Pierre Pevel for The Cardinal's Blades
  - Nominated: Stephen Deas for The Adamantine Palace
  - Nominated: Amanda Downum for The Drowning City
  - Nominated: Ken Scholes for Lamentation
  - Nominated: Jesse Bullington for The Sad Tale of the Brothers Grossbart
- Cover art: Didier Graffet, Dave Senior and Laura Brett for Best Served Cold (written by Joe Abercrombie)

=== 2011 ===
The 2011 awards were presented in June 2011.

- Best novel: Brandon Sanderson for The Way of Kings
  - Nominated: Pierre Pevel for The Alchemist in the Shadows
  - Nominated: Brent Weeks for The Black Prism
  - Nominated: Peter V. Brett for The Desert Spear
  - Nominated: Robert Jordan & Brandon Sanderson for Towers of Midnight
  - Nominated: Markus Heitz for The War of the Dwarves
- Best newcomer: Darius Hinks for Warrior Priest
  - Nominated: N.K. Jemisin for The Hundred Thousand Kingdoms
  - Nominated: Alexey Pehov for Shadow Prowler
  - Nominated: Blake Charlton for Spellwright
  - Nominated: Mary Victoria for Tymon's Flight
- Cover art: Olof Erla Einarsdottir for Power and Majesty (written by Tansy Rayner Roberts)

=== 2012 ===
The 2012 awards were presented in June 2012.

- Best novel: Patrick Rothfuss for The Wise Man's Fear
  - Nominated: Brandon Sanderson for The Alloy of Law
  - Nominated: Kristen Britain for Blackveil
  - Nominated: Joe Abercrombie for The Heroes
  - Nominated: William King for Blood of Aenarion
- Best newcomer: Helen Lowe for The Heir of Night
  - Nominated: Douglas Hulick for Among Thieves
  - Nominated: Mark Lawrence for Prince of Thorns
  - Nominated: Elspeth Cooper for Songs of the Earth
  - Nominated: Peter Orullian for The Unremembered
- Cover art: Raymond Swanland for Blood of Aenarion (written by William King)

=== 2013 ===
The 2013 awards were presented in October 2013.

- Best novel: Brent Weeks for The Blinding Knife
  - Nominated: Helen Lowe for The Gathering of the Lost
  - Nominated: Mark Lawrence for King of Thorns
  - Nominated: Joe Abercrombie for Red Country
  - Nominated: Jay Kristoff for Stormdancer
- Best newcomer: John Gwynne for Malice
  - Nominated: Aidan Harte for Irenicon
  - Nominated: Miles Cameron for The Red Knight
  - Nominated: Jay Kristoff for Stormdancer
  - Nominated: Saladin Ahmed for Throne of the Crescent Moon
- Cover art: Didier Graffet and Dave Senior for Red Country (written by Joe Abercrombie)

=== 2014 ===
The 2014 awards were presented in June 2014.

- Best novel: Mark Lawrence for Emperor of Thorns
  - Nominated: Peter V. Brett for The Daylight War
  - Nominated: Robert Jordan & Brandon Sanderson for A Memory of Light
  - Nominated: Scott Lynch for The Republic of Thieves
  - Nominated: Adrian Tchaikovsky for War Master's Gate
- Best newcomer: Brian McClellan for Promise of Blood
  - Nominated: Mark T. Barnes for The Garden of Stones
  - Nominated: Luke Scull for The Grim Company
  - Nominated: David Guymer for Headtaker
  - Nominated: Antoine Rouaud for The Path of Anger
- Cover art: Jason Chan for Emperor of Thorns (written by Mark Lawrence)

=== 2015 ===
The 2015 awards were presented in August 2015.

- Best novel: Brandon Sanderson for Words of Radiance
  - Nominated: Joe Abercrombie for Half a King
  - Nominated: John Gwynne for Valour
  - Nominated: Mark Lawrence for Prince of Fools
  - Nominated: Brent Weeks for The Broken Eye
- Best newcomer: Brian Staveley for The Emperor's Blades
  - Nominated: Sebastien de Castell for Traitor's Blade
  - Nominated: Kameron Hurley for The Mirror Empire
  - Nominated: Ben Peek for The Godless
  - Nominated: Angus Watson for Age of Iron
- Cover art: Sam Green for Words of Radiance (written by Brandon Sanderson)

=== 2016 ===
The 2016 awards were presented in September 2016.

- Best novel: Mark Lawrence for The Liar’s Key
  - Nominated: Miles Cameron for The Dread Wyrm
  - Nominated: Larry Correia for Son of the Black Sword
  - Nominated: David Guymer for Gotrex & Felix: Slayer
  - Nominated: John Gwynne for Ruin
- Best newcomer: Peter Newman for The Vagrant
  - Nominated: Stephen Aryan for Battlemage
  - Nominated: Seth Dickinson for The Traitor Baru Cormorant
  - Nominated: Francesca Haig for The Fire Sermon
  - Nominated: Lucy Hounsom for Starborn
  - Nominated: Sabaa Tahir for An Ember in the Ashes
- Cover art: Jason Chan for The Liar’s Key (written by Mark Lawrence)

=== 2017 ===
The 2017 awards were presented in July 2017.

- Best novel: Gav Thorpe for Warbeast
  - Nominated: John Gwynne for Wrath
  - Nominated: Jay Kristoff for Nevernight
  - Nominated: Mark Lawrence for The Wheel of Osheim
  - Nominated: Brandon Sanderson for The Bands of Mourning
- Best newcomer: Megan E. O'Keefe for Steal the Sky
  - Nominated: Mark de Jager for Infernal
  - Nominated: Christopher Husberg for Duskfall
  - Nominated: Adrian Selby for Snakewood
  - Nominated: Jon Skovron for Hope and Red
- Cover art: Alessandro Baldasseroni for Black Rift (written by Josh Reynolds)

=== 2018 ===
The 2018 David Gemmell Awards winners were announced at a ceremony July 14, 2018 at Edge-Lit 7 in Derby, UK:

- Best Novel: Robin Hobb for Assassin's Fate
  - Nominated: Miles Cameron for Fall of Dragons
  - Nominated: Mark Lawrence for Red Sister
  - Nominated: Steve McHugh for Scorched Shadows
  - Nominated: Brandon Sanderson for Oathbringer
- Best newcomer: Nicholas Eames for Kings of the Wyld
  - Nominated: RJ Barker for Age of Assassins
  - Nominated: Melissa Caruso for The Tethered Mage
  - Nominated: Ed McDonald for Blackwing
  - Nominated: Anna Smith Spark for The Court of Broken Knives
- Cover art: Richard Anderson for Kings of the Wyld by Nicholas Eames
  - Nominated: Kerem Beyit for The Fall of Dragons by Miles Cameron
  - Nominated: Sam Green for Oathbringer by Brandon Sanderson
  - Nominated: Jackie Morris and Stephen Raw for Assassin’s Fate by Robin Hobb
  - Nominated: Kerby Rosanes for Godsgrave by Jay Kristoff
