= Sins of Empire =

2017 fantasy novel by Brian McClellan

- Author: Brian McClellan
- Cover artist: Gene Mollica and Michael Frost
- Language: English
- Series: Gods of Blood and Powder trilogy
- Genre: Fantasy
- Publisher: Orbit Books
- Publication date: 7 March 2017
- Publication place: United States
- Media type: Print (hardcover & paperback)
- Pages: 624
- ISBN: 978-0-316-40721-2 (Hardcover)
- Preceded by: The Powder Mage trilogy
- Followed by: Wrath of Empire

Sins of Empire is a fantasy novel by American author Brian McClellan, the first book in the flintlock fantasy trilogy Gods of Blood and Powder. It was published by Orbit Books in 2017. A sequel titled Wrath of Empire was released on 15 May 2018.

== Plot ==
Ten years after the events of The Powder Mage trilogy, the Lady Chancellor of the young nation of Fatrasta must use her iron will and secret police force against the unrest of a suppressed population and the machinations of powerful empires.

Michel Bravis, a spy in all but name, a convicted war hero called Ben Styke, and Lady Vlora Flint—general of a mercenary company—must work together to purge the insurrection that threatens Landfall. Loyalties are tested, revealed and destroyed, while old powers are again discovered and will soon be a bigger challenge than Landfall's current worries.

== See also ==
- The Powder Mage trilogy, also by Brian McClellan:
  - Promise of Blood
  - The Crimson Campaign
  - The Autumn Republic
- Wrath of Empire, the second book in the Gods of Blood and Powder trilogy
- Blood of Empire, the third book in the trilogy
