= Blood of Empire =

Book by Brian McClellan

- First edition
- Author: Brian McClellan
- Cover artist: Thom Tenery
- Language: English
- Series: Gods of Blood and Powder trilogy
- Genre: Fantasy
- Publisher: Orbit Books
- Publication date: 3 December 2019
- Publication place: United States
- Media type: Print (hardcover & paperback)
- Pages: 672
- ISBN: 978-0356509334 (Hardcover)

Blood of Empire is a fantasy novel by American author Brian McClellan, the third book in the flintlock fantasy trilogy Gods of Blood and Powder. It was published by Orbit Books on December 3, 2019. It is the sequel to Sins of Empire and Wrath of Empire.

== Plot ==
Michel Bravis, a spy in the Dynize government, must go back to the capital city of Landfall to prevent the enemy of using the power of the unlocked Godstone.

Ben Styke has invaded Dynize, but his fleet scattered in a storm and he is left with only twenty Mad Lancers. Violence is unavoidable.

Her last battle against the Dynize has left Lady Vlora Flint powderblind and emotionally broken, but vengeance keeps her on her feet. She must ally politicians and lead the Adran army to defeat the greatest general under the Dynize flag.

== See also ==
- Promise of Blood, the first book in The Powder Mage trilogy
- The Crimson Campaign, the sequel to Promise of Blood
- The Autumn Republic, the sequel to The Crimson Campaign
- Sins of Empire, the first book in the Gods of Blood and Powder trilogy
- Wrath of Empire, the second book in the Gods of Blood and Powder trilogy
- Brian McClellan, the author of The Powder Mage trilogy
