= Wrath of Empire =

2018 novel by Brian McClellan

- First edition
- Author: Brian McClellan
- Cover artist: Thom Tenery
- Language: English
- Series: Gods of Blood and Powder trilogy
- Genre: Fantasy
- Publisher: Orbit Books
- Publication date: 17 May 2018
- Publication place: United States
- Media type: Print (hardcover & paperback)
- Pages: 639
- ISBN: 978-0316407267 (Hardcover)
- Followed by: Blood of Empire

Wrath of Empire is a fantasy novel by American author Brian McClellan, the second book in the flintlock fantasy trilogy Gods of Blood and Powder. It was published by Orbit Books in 2018. The third and last book in the series, titled Blood of Empire, was released on December 3, 2019.

== Plot ==
After the invasion of Fatrasta and the capital city of Landfall, thousands of refugees seek the safety of Lady Flint's soldiers as she prepares for another war to prevent the return of Gods walking the world.

In the capital, Blackhat spy Michel Bravis must infiltrate the invading Dynize to find a person named Mara. Succeeding in this mission could mean winning the war.

Meanwhile, the Mad Lancers led by Mad Ben Styke are building their own army. They are sent on a mission to find and destroy the third Godstone, led by the bloodmage Ka-poel. But what they find may not be what they're looking for.

== See also ==
- Promise of Blood, the first book in The Powder Mage trilogy
- The Crimson Campaign, the sequel to Promise of Blood
- The Autumn Republic, the sequel to The Crimson Campaign
- Sins of Empire, the first book in the Gods of Blood and Powder trilogy
- Brian McClellan, the author of The Powder Mage trilogy
