= Killer of Men =

Killer of Men or killer of men may refer to:

- Killer of Men (film), 2024 American suspense film
- "Killer of Men", nickname of Ruby Roundhouse, a fictional character in the Jumanji franchise
- Killer of Men, 2021 novel in Christian Cameron's Long War series
- A serial killer, spree killer or mass murderer
- A man-eating animal
