= Statues of Cynisca =

Ancient Greek statues

The statues of Cynisca (also spelled Kyniska from the ancient Greek Κυνίσκα) were two ancient Greek statues which commemorated Cynisca of Sparta’s Olympic victory in chariot racing at the 396 B.C. and 392 B.C. Olympic Games. Cynisca was the first woman to win at the Olympic Games. According to Pausanias of the 2nd century A.D., two statues were erected to commemorate her victory.

== Cynisca’s Olympic background ==
Cynisca’s birth and death dates are unknown. However, her brother, Agesilaus, king of Sparta, was around 48 years old in 396, placing Cynisca in roughly the same age range. Thus, she was no longer a young princess, but she also never married.

It is also likely that Cynisca was not actually present for her own Olympic victories. She did not ride the chariot herself. Rather, she was the owner and trainer of the horses, and the rider functioned like a modern-day jockey in horse racing.

Further, women were not allowed in Olympia during the celebration (specifically gynaikes which is in contrast to parthenoi, or young, unmarried women). The punishment for women caught at an Olympic gathering was to be “hurled from Mount Typaion.” As such, Cynisca during her victories was most likely not at the event or at Olympia at all. But this should not diminish her role in the victory, as she was “an expert in equestrian matters.”

== Historical complications: “Proud pioneer or political pawn?” ==
Whether the statues of Cynisca and Pausanias's later interpretations of Cynisca as a self-motivated, inspired competitor is up for scholarly debate. Other evidence shows that Cynisca played little role in deciding to compete, and was set up to compete by her wealthy family (most notably, her king brother Agesilaus) to invalidate previous winners of chariot racing by showing that “the victory there was not a mark of any great excellence but simply of wealth and lavish outcry” while subsequently aiming to show off Sparta's wealth by succeeding at the event. The best source of this comes from the writing of Xenophon, a long-time friend of Agesilaus. He wrote: “But he [Agesilaus] persuaded his sister Cynisca to breed chariot horses, and showed by her victory that such a stud marks the owner as a person of wealth, but not necessarily of merit.”

Pausanias, writing about these events nearly five centuries later, was building off of more accelerated myths about Cynisca, grounded in different cultural contexts and without the full historical record of the correspondence between Agesilaus and others. As scholar Donald Kyle writes, “He recounted inflated traditions…” and explains how the sporting world of the 2nd century had grown to accept female sport, at least more than Classical Greece. This places into doubt whether Cynisca was self-motivated and competing for her sake, or whether it was more set up by her family. This distinction is important especially in light of the inscriptions on the statues commemorating her victories, which explicitly boasted of Cynisca's triumph as the first woman to win in all of Greece, leaving out the possible behind-the-scenes influence and true motivations of Cynisca's family, Spartan royalty.

== Details and inscription of the sculptures ==
One sculpture, erected in the Altis, considered the heart of the Olympic sanctuary, was composed of bronze statues of Cynisca, the charioteer (jockey), the horses and chariot itself.] Pausanias records that there was a smaller than life-size bronze horses of Cynisca and was found in the Pronaos Temple of Zeus as an offering to the god along with a throne of Arimnestus, king of Etruria, which may be related to Cynisca's honor. Both victory monuments were costly.

The monuments had an epigram inscribed:

Spartas men basilees emoi pateres kai adelphoi;

harmasi ď okupodon hippon nikosa Kuniska

eikona tanď estesa; monan de me phami gunaikon

Hellados ek pasas tonde labein stephanon.

Kings of Sparta were my fathers and brothers,

and I, Cynisca, winning the race with my chariot

of swift-footed horses, erected this statue.

I assert that I am the only woman in all Greece who won this crown.

While the epigram evokes Cynisca in the first person, some people have doubted whether these words belong to Cynisca. According to Pausanias, it was probably written by “some man or another.” Given the background on the other possible interests of Cynisca and Sparta, it's possible Cynisca played little to no role in working on the statues and their dedicatory inscriptions at all. At best, the poetic epigram was written with some instructions from Cynisca, or perhaps her brother, especially considering the formulaic script. Nonetheless, it doesn't diminish that the inscription reinforces the message shown in public spaces at both Olympia and Sparta that Cynisca's victory was on her own accord, further facilitating and motivating later generations of female Spartans and athletes and leading to the time period in which Pausanias later recorded the events.

== Apelles the artist ==
Apelles of Megara (also spelled Apelleas from the ancient Greek Ἀπελλῆς) created the statues of Cynisca including the bronze sculptures. The choice of Apelles suggests that Cynisca (or perhaps Agesilaus) had done some research to find an artist from an allied city who specialized in images of women. Apelles was fond of depicting women praying. This suggests the possibility that Cynisca was portrayed as praying to the gods in some form or another. However, all of Apelles' works are lost. All current perceptions are based on descriptions of Apelles’ art and his style, tendencies, and motivations as an artist.

== Timing and location of the sculptures ==
The statues of Cynisca were most likely erected after her death. The larger statue stood in the center of the polis at the Platanistas which was close to the Dromos, where young girls ran in their leisure time, close to the tomb of Alkman, the educator of young girls, and close to the sanctuary of Helen, who was considered a model for young females in Sparta. Not only was she the first female Olympic victor in her sport, but her monuments were the first dedicated to female victory in pan-Hellenic competitions. This prominent location likely played an important role in how the stories of Cynisca evolved over the centuries into a heroic pioneer of female athletics in ancient Greece.

== Cultural impact ==
Whether Cynisca competed on her own accord or not and to what extent there were other influences and incentives for Sparta and her family, her success and the physical commemoration of her victories in prominent public spaces seemed to have played a role in inspiring the later successful female athletes in the Olympics in the 4th century. As Sarah Pomeroy writes, “In Greece it was not uncommon to treat athletes as heroes, but Cynisca was the first woman to be elevated to this status.” According to Pausanias, many Greek women, especially from Sparta, won Olympic chariot races after Cynisca. One of these female victors, Euryleonis who won in 368 B.C., was commemorated with a statue of her own on the Acropolis, a traditional monument site for male achievement. Pausanias even notes that after the Greco-Persian War, in Lacedaemon, a region in Sparta where one of the statues stood, the people were “the keenest breeders of horses,” noting Cynisca's impact on the region.

The incomplete information, both from what Pausanias and his contemporaries received in the second century A.D., and what current scholars know, point to how a monument in public space can craft and accelerate narratives based on the interpretation that's readily available on the monument. In the case of the Cynisca honors, the story of a triumphant champion is that readily available interpretation, while the more complex background for what occurred at the time requires deeper digging, and therefore often gets left behind by recorders of history like Pausanias.
