= The Powder Mage trilogy =

Fantasy novel series by Brian McClellan

- Promise of Blood (2013); The Crimson Campaign (2014); The Autumn Republic (2015)
- Author: Brian McClellan
- Cover artist: Gene Mollica
- Country: United States
- Language: English
- Genre: Fantasy
- Publisher: Orbit Books (USA)
- Published: 2013–2015
- Media type: Print (hardcover and paperback), audiobook, e-book
- No. of books: 3
- Followed by: Gods of Blood and Powder

The Powder Mage trilogy is a series of epic fantasy novels written by American author Brian McClellan. It consists of the novels Promise of Blood (2013), The Crimson Campaign (2014) and The Autumn Republic (2015). In 2014, Promise of Blood received the Morningstar Award for Best Fantasy Newcomer. Several short stories and novellas set in the world of The Powder Mage trilogy have been published, as well as an additional trilogy called Gods of Blood and Powder.

In January 2021, Joseph Mallozzi announced that he would be writing and producing a television series based on the books with No Equal Entertainment and Frantic Films.

== Plot and setting ==
The trilogy primarily takes place in the fictional kingdom of Adro, one of the Nine Kingdoms founded by Kresimir, a semi-mythical figure now worshiped as a deity. At the beginning of Promise of Blood, Field Marshal Tamas has just committed a coup d'etat against Adro's corrupt and ineffective monarchy. The novel then focuses on the efforts of three men and one woman – Tamas, his son Taniel, a soldier, and former police inspector Adamat, as well as the laundress Nila – in the aftermath of the coup, dealing with conspiracies by royalist supporters, war with Adro's neighbors, and an emerging scheme to "summon" Kresimir.

The technology level of the Nine Kingdoms is roughly on par with that of Europe during the Revolutionary and Napoleonic periods; flintlock firearms are the prevalent weaponry. However, magic is present and its users are usually divided into three classes:

- Knacked are the least powerful, with few or no active magical powers; instead, they have a variety of uncanny abilities; Adamat, for instance, has an eidetic memory, and Tamas's bodyguard, Olem, never needs to sleep.
- Powder Mages are wizards with the ability to metabolize gunpowder and use it as fuel for various magical powers, including telekinesis; they can also manipulate gunpowder, such as causing it to explode spontaneously. Tamas and Taniel are both powder mages.
- Privileged are powerful sorcerers; being exceedingly rare, they are almost exclusively gathered into "Royal Cabals" in direct service to the Nine Kingdoms' various monarchs; at the outset of Promise of Blood, Tamas has assassinated almost the entirety of Adro's Royal Cabal.

== Reception ==
=== Promise of Blood ===
Kirkus Reviews gave the book a starred review stating: "A thoroughly satisfying yarn that should keep readers waiting impatiently for further installments." Publishers Weekly, in reviewing the book, stated "McClellan neatly mixes intrigue and action..." and gave the book a generally positive review.

In 2014, Promise of Blood won the Morningstar Award for Best Fantasy Newcomer. The book's cover, by Gene Mollica and Michael Frost, was also nominated for the Ravenheart Award for Best Fantasy Book Jacket/Artist.

=== The Crimson Campaign ===
Publishers Weekly referred to the book as a "swirling sequel" and Staffer’s Book Review stated it was "just great fun." Kirkus Reviews gave a more reserved appraisal stating the "book is less relentlessly inventive than the inaugural volume but still impressively distinctive and pungent…".

Richard Bray of Fantasy-Faction wrote in his review, "In all, The Crimson Campaign is the rare middle book of a trilogy that actually kicks its pace up a notch. It’s an amazing work, and has the series well-situated for an outstanding finale in The Autumn Republic due out next year.

== Books in the series ==
- Promise of Blood (2013)
- The Crimson Campaign (2014)
- The Autumn Republic (2015)

Eleven novellas and short stories set in the world of The Powder Mage Trilogy were released:

- Hope's End (2013)
- The Girl of Hrusch Avenue (2013)
- Forsworn (2014)
- The Face in the Window (2014)
- Servant of the Crown (2014)
- Murder at the Kinnen Hotel (2014)
- Return to Honor (2015)
- Green-Eyed Vipers (2015)
- Ghosts of the Tristan Basin (2016)
- The Mad Lancers (2017)
- The Siege of Tilpur (2017)

A new trilogy in the series, "Gods of Blood and Powder", was released.

- Sins of Empire (2017)
- Wrath of Empire (2018)
- Blood of Empire (2019)
