= King of Thorns =

King of Thorns may refer to:

- King of Thorn, Japanese manga series
- King of Thorns, The second book in The Broken Empire series by Mark Lawrence
