= Grey sisters =

Grey sisters may refer to:

- Graeae or Grey sisters, three old women from Greek mythology
- Lady Jane Grey, Lady Katherine Grey, and Lady Mary Grey from 16th-century Tudor England
- Meredith Grey, Lexie Grey and Molly Grey-Thompson from the TV series Grey's Anatomy

== Catholic religious sisters ==
- Daughters of Charity of Saint Vincent de Paul or Grey sisters, society of apostolic life based in France
- Grey Nuns, Canadian religious institute based in Montreal
- Grey Sisters of the Immaculate Conception based in Pembroke, Ontario, Canada
- Family Care Sisters or Grey sisters, Australian congregation founded by Cecily Maude O'Connell

== See also ==
- The Grey Sisterhood, 1916 American silent film
- Grey Sister, 2018 novel by Mark Lawrence
