= The Book That Wouldn't Burn =

2023 Fantasy book

- Author: Mark Lawrence
- Genre: High fantasy
- Publisher: Ace
- Publication date: May 9, 2023
- Pages: 576
- ISBN: 0593437918

The Book That Wouldn't Burn is a 2023 high fantasy novel by American-British author Mark Lawrence. It is the first book in The Library Trilogy, followed by The Book That Broke the World in April 2024 and The Book That Held Her Heart in April 2025. Lawrence is also the author of the Broken Empire trilogy.

The book follows the story of Livira, a young and brilliant orphan from the Dust, and Evar, one of five children who were separated from their time and raised together in an immense and inescapable library.

== Plot ==
Out in the Dust, a wasteland of scorched earth and ruined settlements, humankind struggles against the sabbers, a wolf-like species that raid villages, leaving families orphaned. Crath City, a fortress of stone and steel rising from the Dust, encloses an affluent but prejudiced society that fights against the sabbers and its own past. At the city's core lies an ancient, virtually endless library holding the lost sciences and histories of the age before the Dust—knowledge that could save Livira's people, the Dusters, if the right books are found. The library contains the complete knowledge of ages before the Dust, when humanity could cure disease and reach into the stars. It is both salvation and curse: a place where texts can heal or justify slaughter, where portals open into other times, and where identities can be rewritten. Livira, orphaned when the sabbers destroy her village, is brought to Crath by Malar, a swordsman among her rescuers. Despite the city's prejudice, she is taken under the wing of librarian Davris Yute and educated by the library staff. She rises through the ranks, survives assassination attempts fueled by her Duster origins, and secretly begins writing a forbidden book that will later tie her fate to another.

Deep within the library, Evar and four adopted siblings live in enforced isolation. Each was pulled from a different time by the Mechanism, an esoteric, seemingly conscious device that drags individuals across worlds and times into the world of whatever book they carry and sometimes produces dangerous byproducts called Escapes. Raised by an automaton-like Assistant and guarded by the implacable Soldier, the siblings—Kerrol, who learned psychology; Starval, trained in assassination; Clovis, schooled in warfare; and Mayland, a historian who has been missing and presumed dead—became experts in their respective subjects while trapped by the Mechanism. Evar alone cannot remember which book trapped him or what he did to get there.

While hunting a particularly dangerous Escape, Evar finds a handwritten note addressed to him, with a plea reading "find me at the bottom," and, following it into the library's well, he is pulled into the Exchange, an in-between space connecting libraries across worlds and times. There, he encounters Livira at different ages—first a child who stumbled through a portal in her own library, then a teenager who has spent years searching for a way back, and finally a young woman who has risen in the library and learned its ways—each meeting revealing more of the library's secrets and the broader conflict: sieges, sabber massacres, and how texts are used to dehumanize enemies. Their bond deepens as they travel together through a portal to an empty, earlier Crath City and share a kiss, only to find corpses from a chemical attack, revealing an illusion: identities are not what they seem.

Confronted by Clovis and the others, Evar and Livira learn that the Exchange can mask true natures—Livira appears human to some, while Evar is revealed to be a canith (i.e., a sabber), a member of the species that alternately besieges and defends Crath across generations. The city's history has alternated between the canith and human species for ages. As the canith invasion begins in Livira's time and sabbers are driven into human lands by an unknown enemy, the library becomes a battlefield. Political leaders use its texts to justify war; weapons derived from library research ignite a firestorm; and the head librarian—later revealed to be Yute's wife, an Assistant who gave up immortality to act in the world—is accused of betrayal and executed by Mayland when he reappears from a portal not in fact having died.

Amid the chaos, Evar discovers that the book he carried into the Mechanism is the very story Livira has been writing. Together with Malar, they use the Exchange to return to the burning library, where Livira and Malar inhabit Assistant bodies to save friends and where the Soldier and the Assistant who raised Evar are revealed to be their two friends, their minds constrained by the library's rules. The siblings create a diversion to reach the Exchange and encounter the humans Livira led there. A standoff nearly resumes the bloodshed until Livira and Evar reconcile and persuade both sides to stand down. The physical destruction caused by a new invader, the skeer, appears to wipe out the Assistants, but that event frees the spirits of Livira and Malar even as their bodies are lost. Evar and his siblings, with Clovis and Kerrol's help, defeat the remaining skeer, but their guardians seem gone. Afterward, the library's shelves smolder and secrets are exposed, but a small group of survivors—including Evar, his siblings, and Kerrol, who promises he knows a way to find Livira—set out from the ruined stacks with the understanding that the past cannot be fully reclaimed or simply wiped away, and that the book binding their fates remains unread—a hinge between what was lost and what they must now decide to become.

== Main characters ==
- Livira – A librarian from the Dust with a brilliant mind and a hunger to discover the library's mysteries
- Evar Eventari – An isolated sibling with no memory of his lost years in the Mechanism
- Davris Yute – A mysterious and important librarian who helps Livira become a student at the library
- Malar – A rough and foul-mouthed swordsman who saves Livira from a sabber attack and later enters the employ of Yute
- Clovis – One of Evar's siblings. Her book in the Mechanism was about battle and hand-to-hand combat, and she desperately wants revenge for the sabbers' massacre of her family
- Kerrol – One of Evar's siblings. His book in the Mechanism was about psychology, and he is regarded as immensely manipulative and impossible to out-think by his siblings
- Starval – One of Evar's siblings. His book in the Mechanism was about assassination. Though he shows flashes of kindheartedness, he is seen by his siblings as intensely secretive and occasionally terrifying
- Mayland – The missing sibling, with an expertise in history
- The Assistant – The impassive automaton-like being who raises the siblings in the confines of the library
- The Soldier – The protective warrior who accompanies the siblings and ensures they are safe in the library

== Reception ==
The novel received mostly positive reviews. Kirkus Reviews described the book as "gripping, earnest, and impeccably plotted," Publishers Weekly praised the book for its "gripping mystery and beautiful worldbuilding" and wrote that "readers will be desperate for more."

A review in The Harvard Crimson gave the book 2.5/5 stars, describing the book as "captivating" but also noting the story would "benefit from a more concise story line and fully realized characters." Likewise, a review from ElitistBookReviews.com was largely positive, though it also pointed out that the focus on the library overwhelmed some of the character development.
