= Arimnestos =

General in ancient Greece

Arimnestos (Greek: Ἀρίμνηστος; fl. early 5th century BCE) was the commander of the Plataean contingent at the battles of Marathon and Plataea during the Greco-Persian Wars.

== Battle of Plataea ==
Plutarch relates that Arimnestos was responsible for selecting the location of the Battle of Plataea, after receiving guidance from Zeus Soter in a dream. He shared this insight with the Athenian general Aristides, who in turn showed the site to the Spartan regent Pausanias, the overall commander of the Greek forces.

He was present at the death of Callicrates later during the battle.

He was depicted by painted portrait in the Temple of Athena Areia built on the site of the battlefield by the Athenians, beneath a statue of the goddess made by Pheidias to commemorate the victory.

== In fiction ==
Arimnestos is the protagonist and narrator in the Long War series by Christian Cameron.
