= Aeimnestus =

Name of multiple Ancient Greek warriors

- Language: Ancient Greek

Origin
- Meaning: "Unforgettable"

Aeimnestus (Ancient Greek: Ἀείμνηστος) is an Ancient Greek word, also spelled aeímnēstos and arímnēstos that means "unforgettable", literally "of everlasting memory". It was the name of multiple revered Greek warriors.

A Spartan soldier Aeimnestus killed the Persian general Mardonius by crushing Mardonius' head with a rock during the Battle of Plataea in 479 BC. The event was described in Book 9 of the Histories of Herodotus. Plutarch calls the same man "Arimnestus" (Ἀρίμνηστος).

Another Spartan by the same name led three hundred men against the whole Messenian army in the Messenian Wars; both he and his company were killed to the last man.

A Plataean general Arimnestos led his city's host in the battles of Marathon and Plataea.
