= Sebastien de Castell =

Canadian fantasy writer

- Born: Pointe Claire, Quebec, Canada
- Occupation: Author
- Writing career
- Genre: Fantasy
- Website: decastell.com

Sebastien de Castell is a Canadian fantasy writer, best known for his series Greatcoats and Spellslinger.

== History ==
Sebastien de Castell has been nominated for several science fiction and fantasy awards, starting with his first novel, Traitor's Blade, being nominated for the Astounding Award for Best New Writer and the David Gemmell Awards for Fantasy. Two novels in his Spellslinger series would see him nominated for Grand prix de l'Imaginaire and the Sunburst Award, as well as the winner of the Elbakin.net Award. De Castell has stated his interest in writing "optimistic but flawed heroes", saying that it was the type of heroes he enjoyed reading about as a kid, but placed "in an environment that had some of the depth and darkness".

All five of his series are set in the same multiverse. The Greatcoats and The Court of Shadows series are set on the same continent as each other (Tristia) with overlapping characters; The Spellslinger and Argosi series are likewise set on the same continent as each (Eldrasia) other with overlapping characters but also on the same world as the other two series. No characters overlap between those sets of series. The Fifth series takes place on a different plane of existence; but people originating in Eldrasia cross over into that world. It is not mentioned when the 3 sets of series happen in relation to each other.

De Castell has at various times worked as a full-time musician, an interaction designer, teacher, project manager, fight choreographer, actor and more. Before publishing his first novel, de Castell worked at the Vancouver Film School.

== Awards ==
Year	Nominee	Award	Category	Result	Ref
2014	Traitor's Blade	Goodreads Choice Award	Best Fantasy	Semi-Finalist	
2015	Traitor's Blade	David Gemmell Awards for Fantasy	Morningstar Award for Best Debut	Finalist	
2016	Traitor's Blade	Astounding Award for Best New Writer		Finalist	
2016	Traitor's Blade	Prix Imaginales	Foreign Translation	Finalist	
2018	Spellslinger	Elbakin.net	Best translated fantasy YA	Won	
2019	Spellslinger, Shadowblack	Grand prix de l'Imaginaire	Best Foreign Young Adult	Finalist	
2019	Spellslinger	Sunburst Award	Young Adult Award	Finalist	

== Bibliography ==
=== Novels ===
Year	Title	Series
2014	Traitor's Blade	The Greatcoats series
2014	Knight's Shadow	The Greatcoats series
2016	Saint's Blood	The Greatcoats series
2017	Tyrant's Throne	The Greatcoats series
2017	Spellslinger	The Spellslinger series
2017	Shadowblack	The Spellslinger series
2018	Charmcaster	The Spellslinger series
2018	Soulbinder	The Spellslinger series
2019	Queenslayer	The Spellslinger series
2019	Crownbreaker	The Spellslinger series
2021	Way of the Argosi	The Argosi series
2021	The Fall of the Argosi	The Argosi series
2023	The Malevolent Seven	The Malevolent series
2023	The Fate of the Argosi	The Argosi series
2023	Crucible of Chaos	The Court of Shadows series
2024	Play of Shadows	The Court of Shadows series
2025	The Malevolent Eight	The Malevolent series
2026	Our Lady of Blades	The Court of Shadows series
2027	Persophone	(co-author with Kristi Charish)

=== Collections ===
- Tales of the Greatcoats (2021) (a collection of Greatcoats short stories, some previously published by Dashing Blades)
  - "Death of the Swashbuckler"
  - "A Study In Steel"
  - "Dance of the Chamberlain"
  - "Grave of Thorns"
  - "Memories of Flame"
  - "The Assassin's Heresy"
  - "The Wheelwright's Duel"
  - "Duel With the Demon"
  - "When the Sword Seems to Smile"

=== Uncollected Short stories ===
- "Firewood" (a Spellslinger short story)
- The Fox and the Bowman (2018)
- "The Kings Letters" (2018) (a Greatcoats short story)
- "The Dowager Magus" (2018) (a Spellslinger short story)
- "The Sword of Seven Tears" (2021) (a Greatcoat short story)
- "The Red Lily" (2021) (a Spellslinger short story)
- "The Obsidian Worm" (2021) (a Spellslinger short story)
- "Six-String Demon" (2021)
- "Collision" (2022) (a sci-fi short story)
- "Mister Farnsworth Versus the Alien Demons of Ancient Egypt" (2022)
- "Guide to the Greatcoats" (2023) (Reference book to The Greatcoats series)
- "A Knight of Five Souls" (2026) (a Greatcoats short story)
