= Helen Lowe =

New Zealand novelist

- Born: Helen Lowe; 1961 (age 64–65); Wellington, New Zealand
- Occupation: Author
- Writing career
- Genre: Fantasy
- Notable work: The Wall of Night
- Website: helenlowe.info

Helen Lowe is a New Zealand novelist. Her first novel, Thornspell, was published in 2008. She has since published the first two books in The Wall of Night quartet, The Heir of Night and The Gathering of the Lost. Lowe is a three-time winner of the Sir Julius Vogel Award, and won the David Gemmell Morningstar Award for Best Fantasy Newcomer in 2012.

== Early life and education ==
Lowe was born in Wellington in 1961. She attended schools in New Zealand and Singapore. She has a Bachelor of Arts in English and Geography from the University of Waikato. Lowe continued her education at the Stockholm University and in 1984 earned a Postgraduate Diploma in Social Science.

== Awards ==
- 2013 The Gathering of the Lost, shortlisted for The David Gemmell Legend Award
- 2012 The David Gemmell Morningstar Award
  The Ursula Bethell Residency in Creative Writing, University of Canterbury
- 2011 The Heir of Night, Best Novel, Sir Julius Vogel Award
- 2010 The Heir of Night, A Single Titles Reviewers' Choice Award
- 2009 Thornspell, Best Novel: Young Adult, Sir Julius Vogel Award
  Best New Talent, Sir Julius Vogel Award
  Thornspell, Storylines NZ Children's Literature Trust "Notable Book"
- 2007 Argos, Winner, A2O Poetry Competition (Australia)
- 2005 New Zealand Society of Authors / Creative New Zealand Mentorship for Emerging Writers
- 2003 Rain Wild Magic, Winner, Robbie Burns National Poetry Competition

== Bibliography ==
=== Author ===
| # | Title | Year | Type | Note |
|---|---|---|---|---|
| 1 | Thornspell | 2009 | Short story, Young Adults | |
| 2 | The Heir of Night | 2010 | Novel | The Wall of Night, Book 1 |
| 3 | The Gathering of the Lost | 2012 | Novel | The Wall of Night, Book 2 |
| 4 | Daughter of Blood | 2016 | Novel | The Wall of Night, Book 3 |

- 2009 Thornspell, Knopf, USA
- 2010 The Heir of Night: The Wall of Night Book 1, HarperVoyager, USA; Orbit, UK
- 2012 The Gathering of the Lost: The Wall of Night Book 2, HarperVoyager, USA; Orbit, UK
- 2016 Daughter of Blood: The Wall of Night Book 3, HarperVoyager, USA; Orbit, UK
