= Night Angel (series) =

Fantasy novel series by Brent Weeks

- The Night Angel series: The Way of Shadows Shadow's Edge Beyond the Shadows; The Perfect Shadow; The Kylar Chronicles series: Night Angel Nemesis
- Author: Brent Weeks
- Cover artist: Calvin Chu (illustrator); Peter Cotton (designer)
- Country: United States
- Language: English
- Genre: Dark fantasy
- Publisher: Orbit
- Published: 2008-present
- Media type: Print (hardback, paperback, and mass paperback)

Night Angel is a fantasy novel series written by Brent Weeks.

== Novels ==
=== The Books of the North ===
1. The Way of Shadows: October 2008
2. Shadow's Edge: November 2008
3. Beyond the Shadows: December 2008
4. The Perfect Shadow: 2011

=== The Kylar Chronicles ===
1. Night Angel Nemesis: 2023

== Publication history ==
The entire Night Angel trilogy was published as mass market paperback volumes in October 2008. Since its debut, the trilogy has been printed in more than 14 languages, and has more than one million copies in print. The Way of Shadows was also published as a graphic novel by Yen Press, adapted by Andrew McDonald and Ivan Brandon. Orbit Books published a hardcover 10th Anniversary Edition of the trilogy in November 2018.

The trilogy was also adapted into a series of full-cast dramatised audiobooks by GraphicAudio, starting with The Way of Shadows in 2010.
