= The Way of Shadows =

2008 fantasy novel by Brent Weeks

- First edition
- Author: Brent Weeks
- Cover artist: Illustrator: Calvin Chu; Design: Peter Cotton
- Language: English
- Series: Night Angel
- Genre: Fantasy
- Publisher: Orbit
- Publication date: October 2008
- Publication place: United States
- Media type: Print (hardback, paperback, and mass paperback)
- Pages: 688
- ISBN: 0-316-03367-7
- OCLC: 225870139
- Followed by: Shadow's Edge

The Way of Shadows is a 2008 fantasy novel written by Brent Weeks and the first novel in the Night Angel series.

== Setting ==
The novel is set in Cenaria City, capital of the Kingdom of Cenaria on the continent of Midcyru. Beginning in the Warrens—a lawless slum district—the story expands into the East Side, where the wealthy and middle class reside.

Though Cenaria operates under the guise of a monarchy, true power lies with the Sa'Kage (Lords of the Shadows), a council of criminal masterminds.

== Plot ==
The Way of Shadows follows Azoth, a street child who becomes apprenticed to Durzo Blint, the city's premier wetboy—an assassin with supernatural abilities. Assuming the new identity of Kylar Stern, he undergoes years of rigorous training in both combat and magic, particularly concerning a powerful artifact called the ka'kari.

As Kylar masters his craft, he becomes embroiled in a complex political conspiracy involving the criminal Sa'Kage organization and a looming foreign invasion. While protecting his childhood friend Elene and navigating court intrigue, he must reconcile his assassin's duties with his moral compass. The narrative culminates in Kylar confronting crucial decisions about power, loyalty, and identity that will affect both his life and the kingdom's fate.

== Publication ==
The entire Night Angel trilogy was published as mass market paperback volumes in October 2008. Since its debut, the trilogy has been printed in more than 14 languages, and has more than one million copies in print. The Way of Shadows was also published as a graphic novel by Yen Press, adapted by Andrew McDonald and Ivan Brandon. Orbit Books published a hardcover 10th Anniversary Edition of the trilogy in November 2018.

== Awards and nominations ==
- 2009: David Gemmell Legend Award (Finalist)
