= Beyond the Shadows =

2008 novel by Brent Weeks

- First Edition
- Author: Brent Weeks
- Cover artist: Illustrator: Calvin Chu; Design: Peter Cotton
- Language: English
- Series: Night Angel
- Genre: Fantasy
- Publisher: Orbit
- Publication date: December 2008
- Publication place: United States
- Media type: Print (hardback, paperback, and mass paperback)
- Pages: 720
- Preceded by: Shadow's Edge

Beyond The Shadows is a fantasy novel written by Brent Weeks and is the third novel in the Night Angel series.

== Setting ==
Logan Gyre is king of Cenaria, a country under siege, with a threadbare army and little hope. He has one chance - a desperate gamble, but one that could destroy his kingdom.

In the north, the new Godking has a plan. If it comes to fruition, no one will have the power to stop him.

Kylar Stern has no choice. To save his friends-and perhaps his enemies-he must accomplish the impossible: assassinate a goddess.
