= Brian McClellan =

American novelist (born 1986)

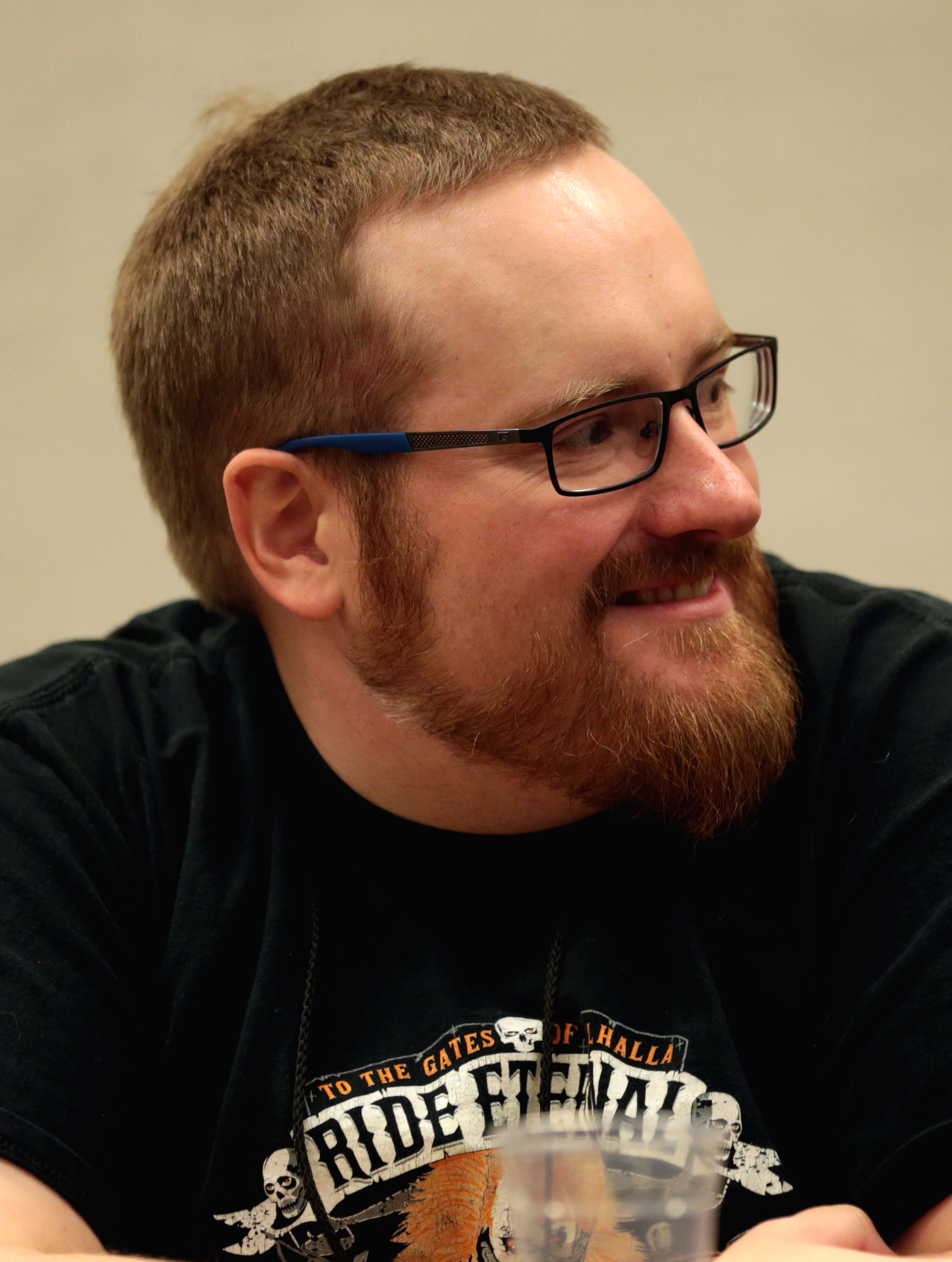
- McClellan at the 2017 Phoenix Comicon
- Born: January 25, 1986 (age 40); Cleveland, Ohio, U.S.
- Education: Brigham Young University
- Occupation: Writer
- Spouse: Michele McClellan
- Writing career
- Period: 2013–present (published)
- Genre: Fantasy
- Notable work: The Powder Mage trilogy
- Website: brianmcclellan.com

Brian McClellan (born January 25, 1986) is an American author of epic fantasy. He is best known for writing the trilogies The Powder Mage and Gods of Blood and Powder.

== Biography ==
McClellan began writing when he was fifteen, starting at Wheel of Time role playing websites. He began working on short stories and novellas in his late teens, when he was encouraged toward writing by his parents.

McClellan went on to major in English with an emphasis on creative writing at Brigham Young University, where he met American author Brandon Sanderson, joining his writing classes. McClellan, wanting his writing to be more than just art, was determined to become a full-time writer. In 2006 he attended Orson Scott Card's Literary Bootcamp. In 2008 he received honorable mention in the Writers of the Future Contest.

McClellan published his first book, Promise of Blood, in 2013. The second book, The Crimson Campaign, was released in May 2014. In February 2015, his next novel, The Autumn Republic concluded the planned Powder Mage trilogy. He then published a sequel trilogy that had tentatively been entitled Goddess of the Empire before being replaced by the more thematically over-arching Gods of Blood and Powder. In 2019 Tor Books announced that they would be working with him to publish his new series, The Glass Immortals.

In 2014, his debut novel, Promise of Blood, won the Morningstar Award for Best Fantasy Newcomer.

== Bibliography ==
=== The Powder Mage trilogy ===
- Promise of Blood (2013)
- The Crimson Campaign (2014)
- The Autumn Republic (2015)

=== Gods of Blood and Powder trilogy ===
- Sins of Empire (2017)
- Wrath of Empire (2018)
- Blood of Empire (2019)

=== Valkyrie Collections series ===
- Uncanny Collateral (2019)
- Blood Tally (2020) (Note: The sequel to Uncanny Collateral)

=== The Glass Immortals series ===
- In the Shadow of Lightning (2022)
- Montego (2023)
- Swords, Cider & Other Distractions (2025)
- On the Road to Ruin (2027)

=== Novellas and Short Stories ===
Twelve novellas and short stories set in the world of The Powder Mage trilogy were released:

- Hope's End (2013)
- The Girl of Hrusch Avenue (2013)
- Forsworn (2014)
- The Face in the Window (2014)
- Servant of the Crown (2014)
- Murder at the Kinnen Hotel (2014)
- Return to Honor (2015)
- Green-Eyed Vipers (2015)
- Ghosts of the Tristan Basin (2016)
- The Mad Lancers (2017)
- Siege of Tilpur (2017)
- Mr Styke (2026)

=== Other ===
- War Cry (2018)
