= Book of the Ancestor trilogy =

Fantasy trilogy by Mark Lawrence

Book of the Ancestor
- Cover art for "Red Sister", first novel in the trilogy
- Red Sister; Grey Sister; Holy Sister
- Author: Mark Lawrence
- Country: United States
- Language: English
- Genre: Fantasy
- Publisher: Harper Voyager (UK); Ace Books (USA)
- Published: 4 Apr 2017 (Red Sister)
- No. of books: 3

The Book of the Ancestor trilogy is a series of three fantasy novels by Mark Lawrence. It comprises Red Sister (2017), Grey Sister (2018), and Holy Sister (2019). The three novels tell the story of Nona Grey, a peasant girl with mystical abilities. Red Sister was nominated for the 2018 David Gemmell Awards for Fantasy.

== Plot ==
=== Premise ===
The planet Abeth was originally settled by four tribes. The hunska have superhuman speed; the gerant have superhuman strength, the marjal can work elemental magic; the quantal can work larger magics. Children born on Abeth may have access to one (or rarely, multiple) bloodline powers. Abeth’s dying red giant sun cannot generate sufficient heat to prevent a global ice age. Abeth’s man-made moon refracts sunlight onto a narrow strip of land circling the globe. This Corridor, only fifty miles wide, is the only unfrozen land on the planet. It comprises several kingdoms fighting for control of the planet’s resources.

=== Red Sister ===
Nona Grey is a peasant girl living in a remote village. She is purchased by a slave trader who recognizes that she has hunska blood. She is brought to the capital of the Empire, where she attacks a noble named Raymel Tacsis. Raymel is seriously injured; his family’s priests are able to save him, but in the process he is possessed by a demon. Nona is saved from execution by Abbess Glass of the Sweet Mercy Convent, who recognizes Nona’s abilities.

At Sweet Mercy, Nona trains with other novices including Arabella "Ara" Jotsis, a noble, and Zole, a girl from the ice tribes. Many believe that Zole is the Argatha, or Chosen One, who will save Abeth. Nona learns that Zole's bodyguard Yisht is attempting to steal a valuable artifact from Sweet Mercy: the shipheart, which was left by the original settlers of Abeth. With four shiphearts, one can control the moon. Nona and the other students fight Yisht, who escapes with the shipheart.

The Tacsis family hires Noi-Guin assassins to kill Nona as revenge for her attack on Raymel. Nona and the other students fight off the assassins; Nona is able to use her powers to kill Raymel.

In a frame story, an adult Nona and Ara are attacked by Noi-Guin assassins and Lano Tacsis, Raymel's brother. They are betrayed by Clera, a former student at Sweet Mercy. Nona attempts to convince Clera to join them against the Empire’s army.

=== Grey Sister ===
Three years have passed since Yisht stole the shipheart. Nona has been possessed by a demon called Keot, who crossed over from Raymel Tacsis when Nona killed him. Keot constantly tempts Nona toward violence, but she is also strengthened by his presence. Nona, Ara, and their friends explore the caves under the convent in defiance of Abbess Glass’s orders. Joeli Namsis is a novice who hates Nona. Joeli reveals that Nona was exploring against orders; Nona is expelled from the convent.

Nona is kidnapped by Noi-Guin assassins and taken to a base under Sherzal’s palace; Sherzal is the emperor's sister. Zole and Sister Kettle infiltrate the lair and, with the assistance of Clera, save Nona. Nona finds Yisht guarding the shipheart; she has been possessed by several demons. Nona expels Keot into Yisht. They escape from Yisht, but cannot retrieve the shipheart.

Sherzal arranges for the Inquisition to visit Sweet Mercy. The Abbess is arrested. At Sherzal’s palace, Abbess Glass is placed on trial for heresy. Sherzal admits to stealing the shipheart, claiming that she will save the Empire by using four shiphearts to seize control of the moon. A fight breaks out between Sherzal’s guards and the Inquisition.

Nona attacks Theron Tacsis, Raymel's father, and leaves him to die. She helps the others escape from Sherzal; Clera remains behind. Zole steals the Noi-Guin shipheart and the group escapes.

=== Holy Sister ===
After escaping from Sherzal’s palace, Nona and Zole separate from the other survivors. They take the Noi-Guin shipheart and flee. They journey through black ice, which is haunted by demons such as Keot. A possessed Yisht confronts them; Nona kills her. Zole and Nona explore a temple created by the Missing, Abeth’s original inhabitants. Nona discovers a portal that can take her back to Sweet Mercy; Zole remains on the ice.

On her deathbed, Abbess Glass instructs Nona to steal the “Book of the Moon”, which supposedly contains instructions for using the shiphearts. She also asks Nona to reject the Red, Grey, and Blue Sisters, and to become a Holy Sister instead. This path is normally taken by those without magical abilities, but Nona agrees.

Three years later, Nona and her allies successfully retrieve the book. Nona becomes a Holy Sister and takes the name Sister Cage. Arabella chooses the Red and becomes Sister Thorn. The capital city of Verity is besieged by the Scithrowl army. As foreseen by Abbess Glass, Nona's choice to become a Holy Sister impresses the highly religious Abbess Wheel and allows Nona to join the coming battle.

The story returns to the frame story from the first novel, with Sister Thorn (Ara) fighting soldiers under the command of Lano Tacsis at Sweet Mercy. In the battle, Clera stabs Ara. Nona drives away the Tacsis army and triggers a tunnel collapse, drowning Lano and the assassins. Clera escapes with Nona and Ara, rejoining them. They reach the emperor’s palace.

Nona reveals that the entire scheme of stealing the book was a ruse to force Sherzal to bring the Sweet Mercy shipheart to the palace. Nona and Ara kill Sherzal. Zole arrives with two shiphearts from the ice tribes; she uses them to give Nona control of the moon. Nona focuses the moon to incinerate the Scithrowl queen; the remaining combatants flee the city. The surviving nuns return to Sweet Mercy to mourn their dead. Nona retains control of the moon and vows to use this power to bring peace to the Corridor.

== Style ==
Writing for Den of Geek, Bridget LaMonica praises Lawrence's subversion of standard fantasy novel tropes. Nona is not presented as a "Chosen One". The story is told in a close third person narrative with an unreliable narrator.

== Background ==
The Book of the Ancestor is Lawrence's first series featuring a female protagonist. It is unconnected from his previous works. Lawrence believes that reading the Malory Towers series by Enid Blyton with his daughter inspired him to focus on an all-female school setting. He also credits various fantasy novels such as The Name of the Wind, A Wizard of Earthsea, and Ender's Game as inspirations for the novel.

== Reception ==
Writing for Tor.com, Laura M. Hughes declared that Red Sister was an improvement from Lawrence's previous works. She praised the book's multiple timelines, writing style, and all-female cast. Publishers Weekly praised the novel's "evocative prose" and "three-dimensional characterizations". Writing for Library Journal, Kristi Chadwick wrote that Red Sister contained a "fantastic world in which religion and politics are dark and sharp as swords". She compared the novel positively to the works of author George R.R. Martin. In her review for the Sydney Mechanics' School of Arts, Melanie Ryan categorizes the novel as grimdark and praises the "exquisitely crafted" world, plot, and characters.

Publishers Weekly wrote that Grey Sister "will keep readers hooked" and that Lawrence's use of "small insights" into his characters lives "elevates the second volume ... above similar books featuring a young woman who is separated from her family". Library Journal gave the second novel a starred review, stating that "vivid worldbuilding and fast-paced action enhance this powerful coming-of-age story". Booklist gave the novel a starred review, praising the worldbuilding and characterization. The review recommended the book for "all adult and YA fantasy collections".

Bridget LaMonica praised Holy Sister's exploration of the themes of corruption and power, as well as the moral ambiguity in the story. She called it "a worthy end to a great series". Publishers Weekly felt that Holy Sister was a "pallid conclusion" to the trilogy, with "uneven prose and stock characters" that "[fail] to live up to the series’ promise".

Red Sister was nominated for the 2018 David Gemmell Awards for Fantasy.
