= John Gwynne (author) =

British fantasy author

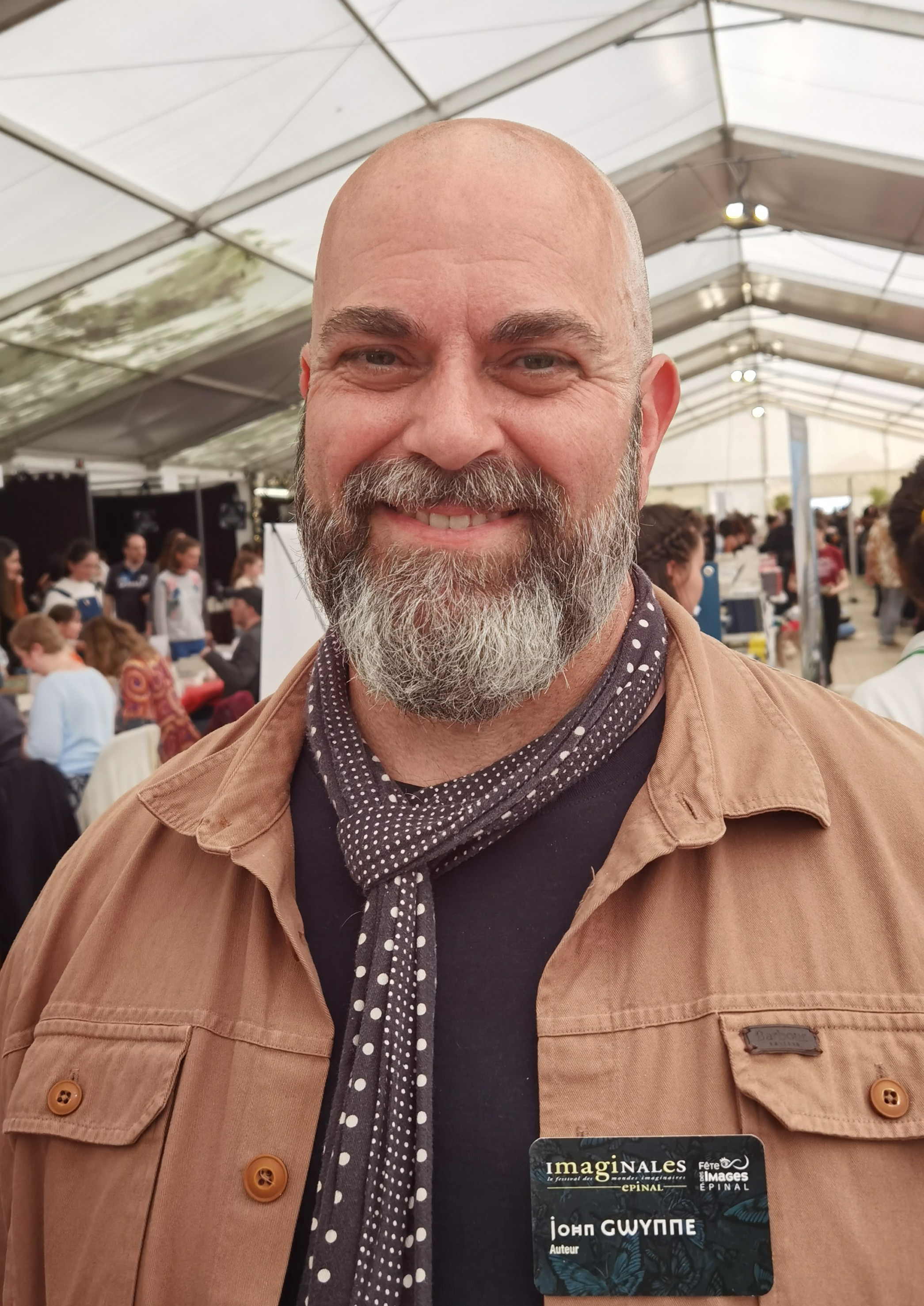
- John Gwynne at Imaginales, France, 2024
- Born: United Kingdom
- Occupation: Novelist
- Writing career
- Genre: Fantasy
- Notable works: The Faithful and the Fallen; Of Blood and Bone; The Bloodsworn Saga
- Notable awards: David Gemmell Morningstar Award

John Gwynne (born 1968) is a British fantasy writer. He is the author of several series, including The Faithful and the Fallen, Of Blood and Bone, and The Bloodsworn Saga. His first novel, Malice, won the David Gemmell Morningstar Award in 2013.

== Early life and background ==
Gwynne studied and later taught at the University of Brighton before beginning his writing career.

== Career ==
Gwynne’s debut novel, Malice, was released by Pan Macmillan in 2012. It won the Morningstar Award the following year. The novel was followed by Valour (2014), Ruin (2015), and Wrath (2016) in The Faithful and the Fallen series.

His next project was the Of Blood and Bone trilogy, which was bought by Tor Books in a six-figure deal. In 2021 he began The Bloodsworn Saga, set in a separate world drawing on Norse mythology, Beowulf, and the Viking period.

Gwynne is involved in Viking reenactment, and said in an interview that this informs the way he depicts fighting and equipment. He has also cited the novels of Bernard Cornwell and films such as Braveheart as influences.

== Reception ==
Publishers Weekly wrote that Malice had a sluggish start but that it was an "ambitious and well-constructed" debut, while Kirkus Reviews said that it was "nothing bad" and had both lively moments and sections where the narrative stalled.

Publishers Weekly, in its review of A Time of Dread, noted its focus on action and its darker tone, and both Publishers Weekly and genre sites such as Fantasy Hive and Fantasy Book Review positively covered The Shadow of the Gods.

The Fury of the Gods reached number five on the The New York Times Best Seller list for trade fiction paperbacks in November 2024. It was named the second best fantasy book of 2024 by Amanda Mullen in Screen Rant.

== Awards and honours ==
- David Gemmell Morningstar Award – Malice (2013)
- BookNest Award for Best Traditionally Published Novel – Wrath (2017)

== Works ==
=== The Faithful and the Fallen ===
- Malice (2012)
- Valour (2014)
- Ruin (2015)
- Wrath (2016)

=== Of Blood and Bone ===
- A Time of Dread (2018)
- A Time of Blood (2019)
- A Time of Courage (2020)

=== The Bloodsworn Saga ===
- The Shadow of the Gods (2021)
- The Hunger of the Gods (2022)
- The Fury of the Gods (2024)

=== The Wolfheart Chronicles ===
- The Wolves of War (2026)
