= The Black Prism =

2010 novel by Brent Weeks

- Cover Image
- Author: Brent Weeks
- Cover artist: Richard Jones
- Language: English
- Series: Lightbringer
- Genre: Fantasy
- Publisher: Orbit Books
- Publication date: August 25, 2010
- Publication place: United States
- Media type: Print (hardback)
- Pages: 640 (hardback)
- ISBN: 978-0-316-07555-8
- Dewey Decimal: 813/.6 22
- LC Class: PS3623.E4223 B57 2010
- Followed by: The Blinding Knife

The Black Prism is a fantasy novel by American author Brent Weeks. It is the first book in the five-volume Lightbringer Series and follows Gavin Guile, a religious leader known as the 'Prism' and the most powerful person in the world, as he combats an uprising led by a self-proclaimed king.

The book is described by the author as "a story of normal brothers—who happen to be in extraordinary circumstances" and explores themes of conflict, resentment, and love. It was first released in August 2010 and received mostly positive reviews.

== Background ==
The Black Prism is set in a pre-industrial fantasy world that is more advanced than most, featuring matchlock gunpowder weapons and widespread use of simple machines like pulleys and gears. The story takes place in The Seven Satrapies, a group of seven semi-autonomous countries surrounding a large sea, each ruled by a 'satrap'. These satrapies enjoy considerable independence but are under the loose control of a federalist, theocratic central government known as the Chromeria. The Chromeria serves as both the governing body and the center for education and regulation of color magic, which is a central element of the series.

The ruling council of the Chromeria consists of seven "Colors," representing each satrapy, along with The White and the Prism. The series revolves around the magical principle of chromaturgy, where light is harnessed to create 'Luxin.' The Prism, apart from being able to use magic from every color, has the unique ability to "split light," allowing them to use magic more efficiently than ordinary magicians, known as 'drafters.' A drafter can continue to use magic until enough Luxin residue builds up in their eyes, causing a condition known as 'breaking the halo.' At this point, they go mad and try to incorporate Luxin into their own bodies, becoming creatures known as wights. The Chromeria, often with the help of the Prism, deals with wights with extreme prejudice.

A Prism represents the god Orholam (a name possibly related to 'hohlraum', a concept in the thermodynamics of radiation, or possibly from the Hebrew 'ohr ha'olam, translated as 'light of the world'), who is believed to bestow magical power upon his chosen. The Prism's abilities, ceremonial authority, status, and Chromeria-sponsored protection grant him a great deal of personal agency, though he has the least official governing power during peacetime. This governing role falls to the 'White,' a non-drafting leader who makes most of the Chromeria's political decisions. Prisms typically die or begin to lose their colors after serving for seven, fourteen, or twenty-one years.

Only one person at a time is typically meant to be a drafter capable both of splitting white light into colors and drafting all seven (the abilities believed to be bestowed on the Prism by Orholam). However, both Guile brothers, Gavin and Dazen, possess this rare ability. Gavin, the elder brother, was groomed from a young age to become the Prism by their father, Andross Guile, who is a high-ranking member of the Chromeria, representing one of the spectrum colors (red).

The trouble begins when Dazen burns down the powerful White Oak family house, killing several women and children inside. As a result, the Chromeria seeks to capture him. Dazen quickly gains allies among the Chromeria's enemies, leading to a brief but bloody conflict (the "False Prism's War"). The war culminates at Sundered Rock in the Satrapy of Tyrea, where Gavin ultimately defeats his brother. Following Dazen's defeat, his general, Corvan Danavis, surrenders. The aftermath leaves Tyrea devastated, with almost all its men killed and its fertile farmland destroyed.

== Plot ==
Sixteen years after the war, the Prism receives a note from a woman claiming to be "Lina," informing him of his 15-year-old son in Tyrea—a child he had been unaware of until now. This son was conceived while Gavin was engaged to Karris White Oak, a member of his Blackguard, the most elite military force in the world. The White, a leader in the Chromeria, sends Karris to Garriston, the capital of Tyrea, to spy on its Satrap's army. She also gives Karris a note about Gavin's unfaithfulness, to be read after leaving the Chromeria.

To keep Gavin and Karris separated, Gavin is assigned to another mission. However, he decides to bring Karris to Garriston himself before she can read the note, using a method of transportation no one else believes possible: magically-aided flight across the ocean. This allows them to reach Tyrea in hours, rather than the month it would normally take.

As they approach their destination, Karris notices smoke and directs them to the former town of Rekton, which has been burned to the ground by Tyrean soldiers. They arrive just in time to save a teenager from execution, killing several of the Satrap's personal bodyguards in the process. Gavin is then confronted by the irate Satrap, who now calls himself King Garadul and declares his Satrapy an independent nation. He admits to ordering the town's destruction as a punishment for the residents' refusal to pay levies.

Tyreans are treated with little respect outside of Tyrea and lack representation in the spectrum of colors. Garriston, the country's only port, is under rotating occupation by the other Satrapies. King Garadul plans to lead his largely conscripted army to seize Garriston and, from there, break the Chromeria's control over the world.

The child is revealed to be Gavin's son, Kip. After debating and exchanging threats with Garadul, alongside brief magical combat, Kip and the Prism are allowed to leave together. However, the king takes a box from Kip, claiming it was stolen from him. The box contains a white dagger that Kip's dying mother gave him, making him promise—amidst curses and abuse—to kill the man responsible for her suffering.

Away from the confrontation, Karris reads the note given to her by the White and is angered by Gavin's betrayal, his lies when breaking off their engagement, and the White's attempts to manipulate her into forgiving him. As a result, she refuses Gavin's offer of assistance for the rest of the journey to Garriston, choosing instead to explore Rekton while Gavin takes Kip back to the Chromeria. In Rekton, she meets Corvan Danavis, Kip's tutor and a former general in Dazen Guile's army. Eventually, Karris is captured by King Garadul, while Corvan continues on to Garriston.

While Kip is brought into the Chromeria under the watch of the Blackguard commander Ironfist, Gavin performs a favor for Corvan's daughter, Liv, in exchange for her teaching Kip, as they are the only Tyreans in the Chromeria. Gavin then enters a hidden prison within the Chromeria, where his brother is secretly imprisoned in a cell where only blue luxin can be drafted. It is revealed that the Prism is actually Dazen, who has stolen his older brother Gavin's identity. After the war, Dazen assumed Gavin's identity and chose to end Gavin's engagement to Karris, despite his own feelings, and denied any affairs.

Dazen interrogates his brother about both Kip and the dagger, which Gavin ominously refers to as "your death coming." Dazen then meets with his father, Andross Guile, to discuss Tyrea. When Dazen mentions the box that Garadul took from Kip, Andross immediately inquires if it contains "the white luxin," a supposedly mythical substance. Gavin was aware of this substance as well, and Andross, not knowing Dazen is not actually Gavin, assumes Dazen understands its significance. Andross orders his son to defeat Garadul's armies and, at all costs, retrieve the dagger.

Kip, the Prism, Ironfist, and Liv depart for Tyrea to defend Garriston from Garadul's armies, sinking several pirates along the way. Around the same time, Corvan arrives in Garriston and agrees to lead the city's defense. Despite their genuine friendship, the Prism and Corvan must pretend to deeply hate and distrust each other. Liv questions her father about the pretense, but he refuses to reveal the truth. She assumes the Prism is blackmailing Corvan with her life and silently vows to make him pay.

Liv and Kip escape to free Karris from Garadul's captivity. Ironfist departs a few hours later to ensure their survival. Liv successfully infiltrates the area, but Kip is recognized and captured, although not before drafting sub-red for the first time. Meanwhile, Karris is taken to meet Lord Omnichrome, a color wight who leads Garadul's drafters. She recognizes him as her brother, Koios, who was thought to have been killed by Dazen in overzealous self-defense before the war.

Ironfist helps Karris and Kip escape, and they both go after Garadul directly. Kip witnesses Lord Omnichrome giving Zymun—a red drafter Kip recognizes from Rekton's burning—his mother's rosewood case. Despite this, Kip decides to help Karris. Omnichrome exploits Liv's disgust with the Prism and the Chromeria to persuade her to join his cause in exchange for aiding Kip and Karris. Omnichrome intends for Garadul to die, so Corvan and Dazen attempt to save him but are unsuccessful. In a fit of rage, Kip kills Garadul before he can be stopped.

Kip, Karris, and Corvan retreat to the docks with the Prism. Kip saves Ironfist's life before chasing the ship that has already left the dock. As Kip runs across the water, he sees someone stab the Prism from behind with the dagger and tackles him off the ship. Kip retrieves the dagger, leaves the assassin for the sharks, and escapes with the Prism's ship.

The Prism gives Kip the case, believing the dagger is lost. Inside, Kip finds a note from his mother instructing him to kill "the man who raped me, Gavin Guile," and telling him that she loves him. One of the clear, diamond-like stones on the dagger's handle has now turned sapphire-colored. Around the same time, the real Gavin escapes from his blue luxin prison after nearly killing himself, only to find himself in an identical green luxin prison. The book ends with Dazen, who is known as Gavin to the world, discovering that he can no longer draft blue.

== Pre-publication ==
On April 30, 2010, the first three chapters of the book were released as a preview on the Orbit Books website.

== Critical reception ==
The book debuted at #23 on The New York Times bestseller list.

The websites Grasping For The Wind, Fantasy Faction and King of the Nerds all gave the book positive reviews. Publishers Weekly described The Black Prism as a "complicated fantasy" that "moves into familiar territory".

In 2011, The Black Prism was a finalist for the David Gemmell Legend Award for Best Fantasy Novel.
