= The Blinding Knife =

2012 novel by Brent Weeks

- Author: Brent Weeks
- Language: English
- Series: Lightbringer
- Genre: Fantasy
- Publisher: Orbit Books
- Publication date: September 12, 2012
- Publication place: United States
- Media type: Print (hardback); Audiobook (CD & MP3)
- Pages: 671 (hardcover)
- ISBN: 978-0-316-07991-4
- Dewey Decimal: 813/.6 23
- LC Class: PS3623.E4223 B575 2012
- Preceded by: The Black Prism
- Followed by: The Broken Eye

The Blinding Knife is a 2012 epic fantasy novel by New York Times bestselling author Brent Weeks, and it is the second book in his Lightbringer series, following The Black Prism. The novel is written from the third-person perspective of several characters and follows the protagonist, Kip Guile, as he discovers his latent magical powers. The Library Journal named the book one of its "Seven Not-to-Miss SF/Fantasy Titles for Fall 2012."

== Plot ==
The Blinding Knife begins four days after the events of the previous novel.

The Prism, Gavin/Dazen, sends Kip back to the Chromeria with Ironfist, instructing him to become a Blackguard. With Karris in tow, the Prism travels to Seer's Island. Ostensibly, he is creating a place for the refugees from Garriston's invasion to live. More importantly, he seeks to speak with a woman who possesses the combined blessing and curse of future-telling. The Prism aims to locate and destroy the blue bane, an island formed from imbalanced blue luxin, which was created by his loss of control over that color. These temples to the color Gods—beings who possess complete mastery over the world-wide reserve of their color—grant them numerous powers, including the physical manipulation of nearby drafters of that color. The temples attract and perfect the chromaturgy of luxin-infused wights. Eventually, these wights awaken, and the God is reborn in the form of an avatar. This quest occupies much of the Prism's time during the first third of the novel.

The real Gavin spends much of this time attempting to escape his new prison.

Kip is forced to gamble with his grandfather, Andross, playing a card game called 9 Kings. Andross is an expert player, while Kip has only seen others play the game. As a result, Kip loses badly and repeatedly, allowing Andross to impose various punishments on Kip and his friends. It is unclear whether Andross is trying to motivate Kip or merely seeking to damage him emotionally. Desperate for more knowledge about the game, Kip eventually turns to Janus Borig, a "mirror," who creates new cards for it.

Each new deck of cards a mirror draws contains unflinchingly honest depictions of historical events. Each card represents a person or significant object from the time when that deck was created, with rules for its use in the game that parallel the advantages and drawbacks in the real world. After the mirrors draw these decks, the cards are copied and distributed one or two at a time, spread out over several different decks. Players use cards that span dozens of generations.

The original cards painted by the mirrors are powerful magical artifacts in their own right. They allow drafters to physically experience the events depicted on them. Kip attempts this with a random card, and his mind is transported to a ship where an old man writes a treasonous letter to a friend regarding the red God. He is quickly pulled back to reality before he can learn more.

The Prism returns to the Chromeria, having lost both green and blue, to rally the spectrum for war with the Color Prince. Through a great deal of political maneuvering, he succeeds, though not without making enemies of red, blue, and yellow, and removing green altogether. Andross pressures him to marry the green, but he ultimately marries Karris instead. Before Andross can properly object, war is upon them.

Meanwhile, the real Gavin escapes his green prison, thanks to blue bread provided by the Prism's room slave. He attempts to bypass the next prison but is ultimately unsuccessful, landing in yellow. Before he can progress further, the Prism comes to speak with him. After a long, intense inner debate, the Prism appears to decide to release Gavin and exile himself. However, he then shoots Gavin instead.

Now that the Prism has lost control of Green, a Green bane is forming, conveniently located at the Color Prince's next site for a hostile takeover. The Color Prince intends to harness it to aid him in his battle. In the midst of this pitched conflict, he faces the blackguards, several warships provided by Chromerian allies, and the Prism himself. He sends Liv Danavis to ensure the God’s avatar is birthed, and an ally of his to embody the new God once it is created. This plan succeeds, but the Green bane is killed by Kip (and a cannon shell) regardless. Kip also kills several of the giants guarding him with his dagger, causing them to revert to their normal human form with all their luxin drained from their bodies. The God himself is revealed to be a former ally of Dazen's and the father of the former Green spectrum member.

Kip and the Prism return to their army's flagship, where an enraged Andross berates the Prism for marrying Karris and a host of other offenses, claiming to have begun the process of unseating him. Meanwhile, Kip recognizes this as the scene in the card, with Andross appearing as a red wight. In a sudden, fierce confrontation, Kip briefly stabs Andross with his dagger before a brawl ensues. The Prism briefly considers killing Kip to retrieve the knife before Andross can, but instead stabs himself with it before diving off the ship. Kip jumps after him.

Andross has had some of his luxin drained by the dagger, but not all of it. His halos are no longer broken, making him sane once more, with plenty of space to draft without worrying about the negative implications of his drafting.

The Color Prince congratulates Liv on a job well done. Having promised her more than she could possibly imagine for completing her task, he delivers on this by insinuating that, once a Superviolet bane is created, he will choose her to be its avatar. He adds that the Prism has been declared dead and that he is now unstoppable.

A pirate "rescues" the Prism and Kip. He takes Kip's dagger (which now more closely resembles a broadsword, with a musket mounted on it), and the Prism is revived. The pirate, named Gunner, decides to keep 'Gavin' but throws Kip back into the ocean. Kip eventually washes up on the shore and is captured by Zymun Whiteoak, who returns him to the Chromeria under Andross's instructions. It is then revealed that Zymun is Kip's half-brother, the child of Karris and the real Gavin, who is also Kip's actual father.

The Prism wakes up on the pirate ship. Gunner informs him that he is now "galley slave #6," and as he leaves, Gavin discovers that he is now completely colorblind.

== Reception ==
Publishers Weekly gave a mostly positive review of The Blinding Knife, praising its flaws as "realistic", while stating that the book was "familiar". RT Book Reviews called it a "decent effort" but wrote that it felt "derivative of previous epic fantasies and science fiction works like Ender’s Game".

In 2013, The Blinding Knife won the David Gemmell Legend Award for Best Fantasy Novel.
