= Shadow's Edge =

2008 novel by Brent Weeks

- First Edition
- Author: Brent Weeks
- Cover artist: Illustrator: Calvin Chu; Design: Peter Cotton
- Language: English
- Series: Night Angel
- Genre: Fantasy
- Publisher: Orbit
- Publication date: November 2008
- Publication place: United States
- Media type: Print (hardback, paperback, and mass paperback)
- Pages: 656
- Preceded by: The Way of Shadows
- Followed by: Beyond the Shadows

Shadow's Edge is a fantasy novel written by Brent Weeks and the second novel in the Night Angel series released in November 2008.

== Plot introduction ==
The story takes place in the fictional land of Midcyru. It centers upon Kylar, the Night Angel, once an apprentice of Durzo Blint, a former celebrated wetboy and his journey for retribution against those who torn his kingdom asunder in a coup months prior to the events of the novel.

== Plot summary ==
Kylar Stern has rejected the assassin's life. In the wake of the Godking's violent coup, both his master and his closest friend are dead. His friend was Logan Gyre, heir to Cenaria's throne, but few of the ruling class survive to mourn his loss. So Kylar is starting over: new city, new companions, and new profession. But when he learns that Logan might be alive, trapped and in hiding, Kylar faces an impossible choice: he could give up the way of shadows forever, and find peace with his young family. Or he could succumb to his flair for destruction, the years of training, to save his friend and his country - and lose all he holds precious.

Godking Garoth Ursuul has assumed power in Cenaria and is manipulating the futures and destinies of all who live there. Many nobles, led by self-proclaimed Queen Terah Graesin, have left the city in ruins to the Khalidorans. Attempting to leave behind the life of shadows that ruined his master, Kylar flees to Caernarvon and an idyllic life with Elene. But darkness finds Kylar along the road to the light as friends return for one last job and Kylar learns more about who Durzo and ultimately Kylar are. Kylar has become a titanic force with a foot in the light and in the dark, but must choose which path to follow.
