= The Heir of Night =

Book by Helen Lowe

- Author: Helen Lowe
- Illustrator: Peter Fitzpatrick
- Cover artist: Gregory Bridges
- Language: English
- Series: The Wall of Night
- Genre: Epic fantasy
- Published: September 28, 2010
- Publisher: EOS Books
- Publication place: New Zealand
- Media type: Print
- Pages: 466 pp
- ISBN: 978-0-0617-3404-5
- OCLC: 526057693
- Dewey Decimal: 823.92
- LC Class: PR9639.4.L69
- Followed by: The Gathering of the Lost

The Heir of Night is an epic fantasy novel written by New Zealand author Helen Lowe. It is the first novel in The Wall of Night series. It was first published on 28 September 2010.

In the novel, Helen Lowe introduces the reader to The House of Night, a warrior House of the Derai Alliance. The House of Night is believed to be the "first and oldest" of all Nine Houses in the Alliance. An ancient prophecy says that if the House of Night falls, then all of the Derai will fall. The house is led by the Earl of Night, the main character, Malian, is the teenage heir to the House of Night. In the world of Haarth, there are nine houses of a race not native to the world of Haarth called the Derai, some are allies, and some are enemies, but all with one common, overarching goal: each of these houses works to defend the Wall of Night, a vast mountain range that separates the Derai from their ancient and mortal enemies, the Swarm of Dark.

== Plot summary ==
Malian, the young Heir to the family of Night. She is trained to take over the duty of one day leading her House and Family, their duty is to protect the world from the ancient enemy that lives beyond the Keep of Winds and the vast mountain range known as the Wall of Night. But one night everything changes.

After Malian and Kalan together with a mystical power manages to alert the New Keep of the attack by the Dark Swarm. After a long and hard struggle to drive the Dark Swarm out of the New Keep. The people of the keep, realize that the Heir is missing and assemble a rescue party to seek for her in the old keep. But unbeknown to the Earl of Night a decision is made that Malian must leave the Keep while she comes into her full power. Only then may she be able to defeat this ancient enemy and save the Derai and all of Haarth.

She leaves the Keep with the young novice priest that she has now befriended, and her Steward Nhairin and two soldiers to protect her. They head out into the world. But they are followed. Someone has let her secret departure to be known. They are pursued into the land of Jaransor a land with an awakening power that does not like the Derai. No one is quite sure if the power that is waking is good, bad or mad but they do not want to find out. The pursuers catch up with them and they find that Nhairin the steward has turned against them, possibly because of a madness caused by the power in the land or maybe by the Dark Swarm themselves. They are helped by the arrival of the two heralds who help them get away from the Darkswarm pursuers. They meet up with a Shaman from the Winter Lands who has creates a snow storm to help them escape from the lands controlled by the Derai and to disappear from the following Darkswarm.
