= The Broken Empire Trilogy =

Book series by Mark Lawrence

- Cover of Prince of Thorns, the first book in the trilogy.
- Prince of Thorns (2011); King of Thorns (2012); Emperor of Thorns (2013)
- Author: Mark Lawrence
- Country: United Kingdom
- Language: English
- Genre: Fantasy; Adventure
- Publisher: Harper Voyager (UK); Ace Books (US)
- Published: August 2011 – August 2013
- Media type: Print (hardcover and paperback), audiobook, e-book

The Broken Empire Trilogy is a trilogy of fantasy novels written by American-British author Mark Lawrence. The first volume, Prince of Thorns, was published on August 2, 2011. The second, King of Thorns, was published on August 7, 2012. The third and final volume, Emperor of Thorns, was published on August 6, 2013.

The trilogy follows the life of Jorg Ancrath as he goes from scorned prince to emperor using whatever means necessary.

== Books in the series ==
#	Title	Pages	Chapters	Audio	Publication date
1	Prince of Thorns	336	49	9h 19m	August 2, 2011
2	King of Thorns	597	49	13h 30m	August 7, 2012
3	Emperor of Thorns	574	54	13h 47m	August 6, 2013

In the trilogy, each different book is a direct sequel to the ones before it. All three books have chapters in present time and flashbacks from four to five years previous.

== Reception ==
Prince of Thorns, was a finalist in the Goodreads Choice Award for "Best Fantasy 2011", a David Gemmell Morningstar Award Finalist in 2012 and short listed for the Prix Imaginales (Roman étranger) in 2013. Prince of Thorns was also one of Barnes & Noble's "Best Fantasy Releases of 2011".

King of Thorns was again a finalist in the Goodreads Choice Award for "Best Fantasy 2012." King of Thorns was also one of Barnes & Noble's "Best Fantasy Releases of 2012", and a David Gemmell Legend Award Finalist in 2013.

Emperor of Thorns was published in August 2013 and was on The Sunday Times Bestseller list. It also made the final of the Goodreads Choice Award (2013) and won the David Gemmell Legend Award (2014).

== Characters ==
- Jorg Ancrath – The main protagonist of the series, Jorg endures many emotional and physical traumas throughout the series leaving him deeply damaged, resulting in him largely being unfeeling to the suffering of others. He is willing to hurt or kill anyone in his quest to ascend to the throne of the Broken Empire. After the brutal murder of his mother and younger brother, Jorg runs away from his father and his home; coming to lead a band of vicious outlaws known as the Brotherhood. He serves as the narrator.
- The Nuban – One of Jorg's most loyal followers, deadly accurate with his powerful crossbow, little is known about him to the point that very few even know his name, "the Nuban" being a reference to his inky-black skin. Rarely among the brotherhood, Jorg thinks highly of him, commenting that he is (morally) better than them all.
- Rike – Rike is a notably large and bloody minded member of the Brotherhood, who seems to be exclusively motivated by gaining loot, not even being motivated by Jorg killing his brother. Rike is quite simple and when pressed the only redeeming quality for Rike that Jorg can think of is "he's big."
- Sir Makin – Before becoming a knight, Sir Makin was a notorious outlaw, sacking cities and burning down cathedrals. He sometimes criticized Jorg's plans by stating that he didn't actually have them. Sir Makin is incredibly skilled with a sword and has the best sense of humour out of all of Jorg's 'road brothers'. He is arguably Jorg's closest friend. Jorg states that a man like Makin is almost unknowable, and that he "learns one new fact about him per year."
- Red Kent – A highly skilled and deadly warrior, Kent gained the title "Red" after being found by the brotherhood covered in the blood and gore of seventeen patrolmen. Red Kent is troubled by his past but will always remain loyal to the few friends that remain. Kent is strongly religious.
- Olidan Ancrath – Jorg's father and King of Ancrath. He is the primary source of Jorg's drive to unite the Broken Empire. His cold and murderous treatment of his son has scarred Jorg and left them unable to unite, even if it means saving the Broken Empire.
- The Dead King – A being who has surpassed and subjugated all other undead beings. He is the primary antagonist of the third novel, Emperor of Thorns. His origins remains shrouded in mystery, but his power and desire to bring about the rebirth of the Empire through its destruction are quite clear. He is fixated on having Jorg join him, enlisting Chella, a necromancer, to bring him to their side.

== Adaptations ==
=== Audiobooks ===
An unabridged audiobook version of Prince of Thorns and King of Thorns was released in 2012 by Recorded Books and narrated by James Clamp.

In 2013, an unabridged audiobook version of Emperor of Thorns was released by Recorded Books and is also narrated by James Clamp.

The UK audiobooks for the trilogy are narrated by Joe Jameson.

=== Film ===
In 2017 Paramount Pictures acquired the film rights to the trilogy. Filming is yet to be scheduled.
