= Brent Weeks =

American fantasy writer (born 1977)

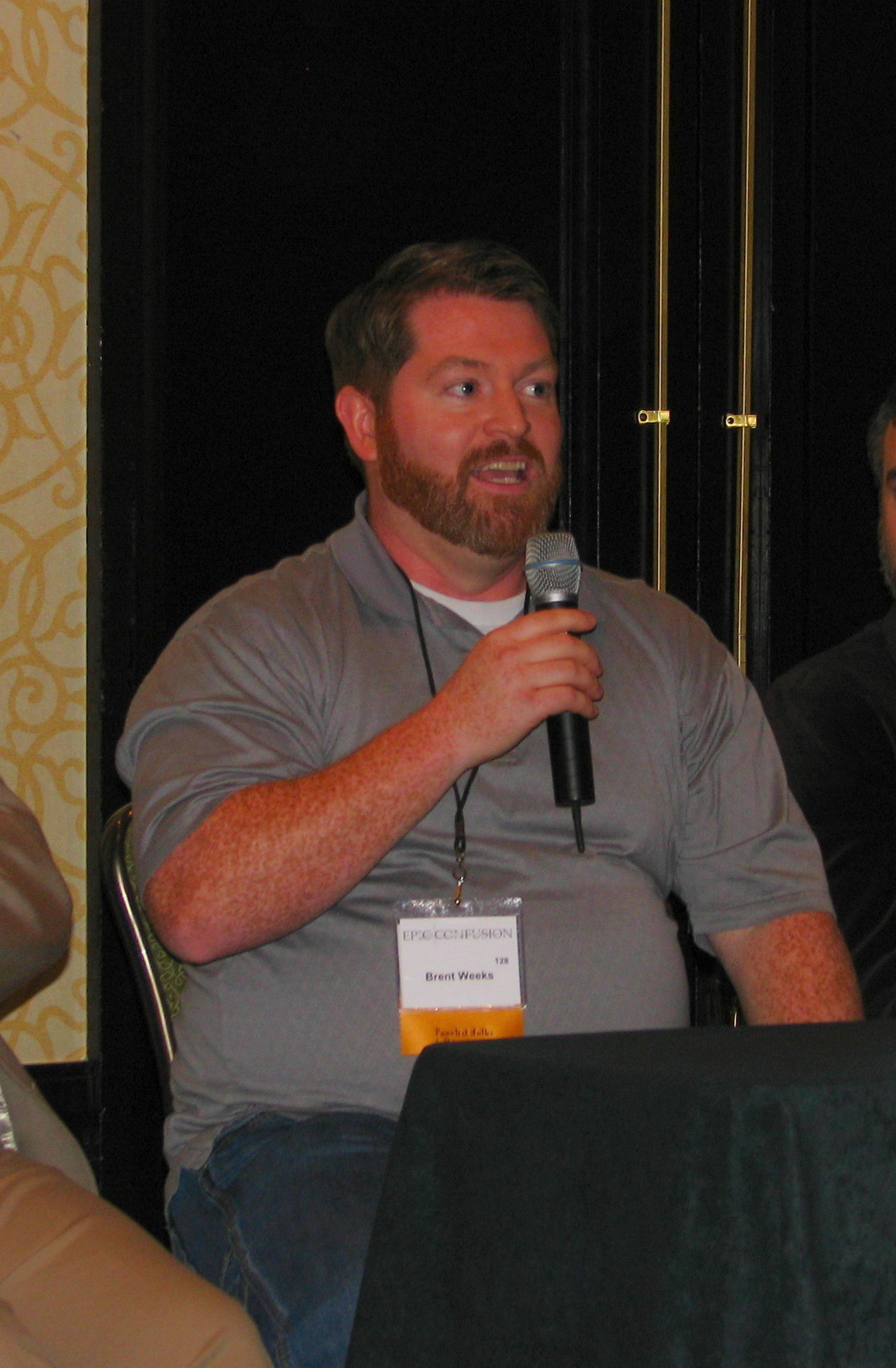
- Born: March 7, 1977 (age 49); Montana, U.S.
- Education: Hillsdale College
- Occupation: Writer
- Spouse: Kristi Weeks
- Writing career
- Genre: Fantasy
- Website: brentweeks.com

Brent Weeks (born March 7, 1977) is an American fantasy writer. His debut novel, The Way of Shadows, was a New York Times best seller in April 2009. Each of the five books in his Lightbringer series made the NYT list as well, starting with The Black Prism in 2010. He lives and works near Portland, Oregon with his wife, Kristi, and their two daughters.

== Early life ==
Weeks was born in Whitefish, Montana, on March 7, 1977. He attended Whitefish High School, and graduated from Hillsdale College in 2000 with a degree in English. He has said that he decided to try writing novels during a semester abroad at Oxford College, an experience that was influential to him personally and professionally. He briefly worked as a teacher at Salem Academy in Oregon and as a bartender before moving to writing full-time.

== Writing ==
Weeks has published two complete series, the Night Angel trilogy and the Lightbringer series. All eight novels are published by Orbit Books, a division of Hachette Book Group. His writing has been heavily influenced by the Classics (including The Odyssey and Dante's Inferno), Shakespeare, William Butler Yeats, and J. R. R. Tolkien.

The entire Night Angel trilogy—The Way of Shadows, Shadow's Edge, and Beyond the Shadows—was published as mass market paperback volumes in October 2008. Since its debut, the trilogy has been printed in more than 14 languages, and has more than one million copies in print. The Way of Shadows was also published as a graphic novel by Yen Press, adapted by Andrew McDonald and Ivan Brandon. Orbit Books published a hardcover 10th Anniversary Edition of the trilogy in November 2018. Perfect Shadow, a novella set in the Night Angel universe, was published by Subterranean Press as a lettered & numbered hardcover edition in 2011, and is currently available from Orbit as an ebook. There are more than 4 million copies of his books in print.

The first novel in his Lightbringer series, The Black Prism, was released in 2010. The series was originally intended to be a trilogy, but after sending the completed manuscript for The Black Prism, Brent Weeks sent an email to his editor saying it would be more than three books. His publishers announced in 2012 (to coincide with the release of book 2, The Blinding Knife) that it would span four books, the third of which, The Broken Eye, was released in August 2014.

On May 11, 2016, Brent Weeks announced via email newsletter and his website that the fourth installment in the Lightbringer series, The Blood Mirror, would be published on October 25/27 of 2016 (US/UK release dates, respectively). He also announced that "There will be five books in the Lightbringer series, not four..." Weeks did not, however, indicate a release date.

The fifth and final book in the Lightbringer series, The Burning White, was published on October 22, 2019. Weeks wrote a longform essay for the promotional tour of the book, titled "On Ending Well".

Each book in the Lightbringer series appeared on the New York Times Bestseller List, with The Burning White reaching #4 on the Combined Print & E-book list. The Black Prism was recently listed among the best Sci-Fi & Fantasy Novels of the 2010s by BookBub.

Weeks is represented by the Donald Maass Literary Agency.

On June 6, 2022, Weeks announced on Twitter that the fourth book of the Night Angel series would be released in the spring of 2023.

== Works ==
=== Night Angel series ===
Original Trilogy

1. The Way of Shadows (2008)
2. Shadow's Edge (2008)
3. Beyond the Shadows (2008)

Night Angel novellas

- Perfect Shadow (prequel) (2011)

Night Angel short stories

- "I, Night Angel" (sequel; available for free in Wattpad)

Graphic novels

- The Way of Shadows: The Graphic Novel (2014)

The Kylar Chronicles

1. Night Angel Nemesis (2023)

=== Lightbringer series ===
1. The Black Prism (2010, ISBN 978-1841499048)
2. The Blinding Knife (2012, ISBN 978-1841499086)
3. The Broken Eye (2014, ISBN 978-1841499116)
4. The Blood Mirror (2016, ISBN 978-0356504636)
5. The Burning White (2019 ISBN 978-0316251303)

Lightbringer short stories

- "Gunner's Apprentice" (2014, between Books 3 and 4; non-canonical.)
- "Shawarma Scene" (2019, after Book 5.)

== Awards ==
| Year | Award | Place | Category | Title |
|---|---|---|---|---|
| 2009 | Compton Crook Award | Nomination | Balticon—Best First Novel | Way of Shadows |
| 2009 | Gemmell Award | Nomination | Legend Award | The Way of Shadows |
| 2010 | Goodreads Reader's Choice | 6 | Fantasy | The Black Prism |
| 2011 | Endeavour | Nomination | Distinguished Novel or Collection | The Black Prism |
| 2011 | Gemmell Award | Nomination | Legend Award | The Black Prism |
| 2012 | Goodreads Reader's Choice | 5 | Fantasy | The Blinding Knife |
| 2013 | Endeavour | Nomination | Distinguished Novel or Collection | The Blinding Knife |
| 2013 | Gemmell Award | Win | Legend Award | The Blinding Knife |
| 2013 | German Reader's Choice | Nomination | Leserpreis/Translation | The Blinding Knife/Die Blendende Klinge |
| 2014 | Goodreads Reader's Choice | 12 | Fantasy | The Broken Eye |
| 2015 | Gemmell Award | Nomination | Legend Award | The Broken Eye |
| 2016 | Goodreads Reader's Choice | 19 | Fantasy | The Blood Mirror |
| 2019 | Goodreads Reader's Choice | 17 | Fantasy | The Burning White |
