= Killer of Men (film) =

- Theatrical release poster
- Directed by: Tzvi Friedman (credited as "Tzvi")
- Written by: Tzvi
- Produced by: Cary Woods
- Starring: Jon Peterson, Stacie Brown
- Cinematography: Mikhail Kniazev
- Edited by: Kristian Otero
- Music by: Ethan Statzman
- Distributed by: Quiver Distribution
- Release date: 2023
- Running time: 72 minutes
- Country: United States
- Language: English
- Budget: Approx. $10,000

Killer of Men is a 2023 American independently-produced suspense film written and directed by Tzvi Friedman (credited mononymously as "Tzvi").

Inspired by Tzvi's own Brooklyn neighborhood, the film follows a socially isolated delivery driver with congenital analgesia who secretly works as a contract killer.

== Plot ==
An unnamed man living a solitary life in Brooklyn follows a strict daily routine, working as a delivery driver while secretly carrying out brutal contract killings. Emotionally numb and detached from those around him, he suffers from congenital analgesia, a rare condition that prevents him from feeling physical pain, to which he has adapted by inflicting violence on others with calm efficiency.

His routine is disrupted when he meets Eva, a kind schoolteacher, at a chance encounter in a laundromat. As the two begin to form a tentative connection, the man experiences an unfamiliar sense of human closeness that causes him to question his violent existence. However, his inability to abandon his past actions, combined with mounting suspicion from a coworker and the growing consequences of his crimes, place him in increasing moral and personal conflict.

== Production and reception ==
The film was made on a budget of approximately $10,000, largely funded through small online contributions from friends. Production relied on borrowed locations, volunteer cast and crew recruited through informal networks, and minimal resources.

Killer of Men premiered at the Woodstock Film Festival in 2023, where it received generally positive notices. Following its festival debut, the film was acquired for sales representation by William Morris Endeavor and for distribution by Quiver Distribution.

The film was met with acclaim from the film community, with Ramin Bahrani praising Tzvi’s direction as the “definition of a low-budget auteur,” and film journalist Eric Kohn calling it “one of the best debuts of 2024.”

Critic Alexandra Heller for the AWFJ praised the film as “a powerhouse performance by Jon Peterson in the lead,” and described it as “a taut, elegant low-budget feature where a confident grasp of the visual language of cinema speaks as much, if not more so, than narrative nuts and bolts like dialogue.” .
