= Mark Lawrence (author) =

American-British novelist (born 1966)

- Occupations: Writer; novelist; research scientist
- Children: 4
- Writing career
- Genre: Fantasy
- Notable works: The Broken Empire Trilogy; The Red Queen's War (Trilogy)
- Website: MarkLawrence.buzz

Mark Lawrence (born 1966) is an American-British novelist who wrote The Broken Empire trilogy. In 2014, Lawrence won the David Gemmell Award for Fantasy for best novel for Emperor of Thorns., and again in 2016 for best novel for The Liar's Key. He operates the annual Self-Published Fantasy Blog-Off.

== Biography ==
Mark Lawrence was born in 1966 in the United States. While he was young, his parents moved to the United Kingdom. Lawrence has a degree in physics and holds a PhD in mathematics.

He is married and has four children. Lawrence is the primary carer of his disabled child Celyn, and for this reason he does not travel to promote his books or attend conventions. He works as a novelist and was a research scientist in the field of artificial intelligence. He has held a secret level of clearance with both the US and UK governments.

Since 2015, Lawrence has operated the annual Self-Published Fantasy Blog-Off, a literary contest intended to bring greater visibility to self-published English-language fantasy authors.

In 2021 he was nominated for the Nobel Peace prize as part of the North Carolina Committee on justice reform.

== Reception ==
Lawrence's first work, Prince of Thorns, was a finalist for the Goodreads Choice Award for "Best Fantasy 2011", a David Gemmell Morningstar Award Finalist in 2012, and short-listed for the Prix Imaginales (Roman étranger) in 2013. Prince of Thorns was also one of Barnes & Noble's "Best Fantasy Releases of 2011".

His second book, King of Thorns was again a finalist in the Goodreads Choice Award for "Best Fantasy 2012." King of Thorns was also one of Barnes & Noble's "Best Fantasy Releases of 2012", and a David Gemmell Legend Award Finalist in 2013.

The final book in the Broken Empire trilogy, Emperor of Thorns, was published in August 2013 and was on The Sunday Times Bestseller list. It also made the final of the Goodreads Choice Award (2013) and won the David Gemmell Legend Award (2014).

His second trilogy, The Red Queen's War, is set in the same world as the Broken Empire trilogy. Prince of Fools was a semi-finalist in the Goodreads Choice Award for "Best Fantasy 2014" in an expanded category. It was also a David Gemmell Legend Award Finalist in 2015. The Liar's Key was a semi-finalist in the Goodreads Choice Award for "Best Fantasy 2015", and won Lawrence a second David Gemmell Legend Award (2016). The Wheel of Osheim was a semi-finalist in the Goodreads Choice Award for "Best Fantasy 2016".

Lawrence's books have been in the Goodreads Choice Award category for "Best Fantasy" 11 times and in the "Best Science Fiction" category once (One Word Kill). In addition, he was the artist for Wheelmouse and All the Crazy Robots, which was included in the awards' "Best Picturebook" category.

In April 2015, Harper Voyager acquired the rights for his next fantasy trilogy—the Red Sister trilogy—for a six-figure sum from Ian Drury at Sheil Land. This trilogy is not set in the world of the Broken Empire.

His books have appeared on The Sunday Times Bestseller list five times, most recently with his 20th book, Daughter of Crows, which debuted at number 3 on the list.

His work is translated into 32 languages, and he has sold around four million books worldwide.

== Bibliography ==
=== The Broken Empire ===
1. Prince of Thorns (August 2011)
2. King of Thorns (August 2012)
3. Emperor of Thorns (August 2013)

A short story collection entitled Road Brothers set in the Broken Empire was released in 2015.

=== The Red Queen's War ===
1. Prince of Fools (June 2014)
2. The Liar's Key (June 2015)
3. The Wheel of Osheim (June 2016)

=== Book of the Ancestor trilogy ===
1. Red Sister (April 2017)
2. Grey Sister (April 2018)
3. Holy Sister (April 2019)

=== Impossible Times ===
1. One Word Kill (May 2019)
2. Limited Wish (June 2019)
3. Dispel Illusion (November 2019)

=== The Book of the Ice ===
1. The Girl and the Stars (April 2020)
2. The Girl and the Mountain (April 2021)
3. The Girl and the Moon (April 2022)

=== The Library Trilogy ===
1. The Book That Wouldn't Burn (May 2023)
2. The Book That Broke the World (April 2024)
3. The Book That Held Her Heart (April 2025)

=== The Kindness Academy ===
1. Daughter of Crows (March 2026)

=== Short and standalone works ===
- Dark Tide (2012) released in Fading Light Anthology
- Quick (2013) released in Triumph Over Tragedy Anthology
- Select Mode (2013) a Broken Empire short story released in Unfettered
- Bad Seed (2014) released in Grimdark Magazine issue No. 1
- During the Dance (2014) A free standalone short story that is available on his Website
- A Rescue (2015) Available in "Legends II: Stories in Honour of David Gemmell" (editor Ian Whates)
- Gunlaw (2015) A Standalone book that is serially released on Wattpad
- Bulletproof (2016) a short story released in Unfettered II
- The Dream-Taker's Apprentice (2015) First published in Fantasy Faction's 2015 anthology and one of three winners to be included in the Remastered Words 2017 audio anthology, eventually titled "Fabled Journey II"
- Christmas Tale - A free standalone short story that is available on his website
- Locked In - A free standalone short story that is available on his website
- No Second Troy - A short story that is available in the Broken Empire Omnibus
- Road Brothers - A short story collection that has 10 stories all set in The Broken Empire world.
- Blood of the Red - A standalone books that is serially released on Wattpad
- The Hero of Aral Pass (2017) released in Art of War: Anthology for Charity
- Bound (2018) a short story in the Book of the Ancestor trilogy
- A Thousand Years (2019) a short story in the Red Queen's War universe published in Unfettered III
- The New World (2023) A novella in the Red Queen's War trilogy
- Overdue (2023) - A short story that takes place in the Library trilogy world
- Returns (2024) - Two short stories ("Returns" and "About Pain") that takes place in the Library trilogy world
- "The Bookshop Book" (2026) -a standalone novel within the world of The Library Trilogy

=== Poetry ===
Free poems available on his website:

- "Sea Song"
- "Stumble"
- "Blue"
- "Shouting for the Echo"
- "High, Cold, Silent, Alone"
