= Pierre Pevel =

French writer

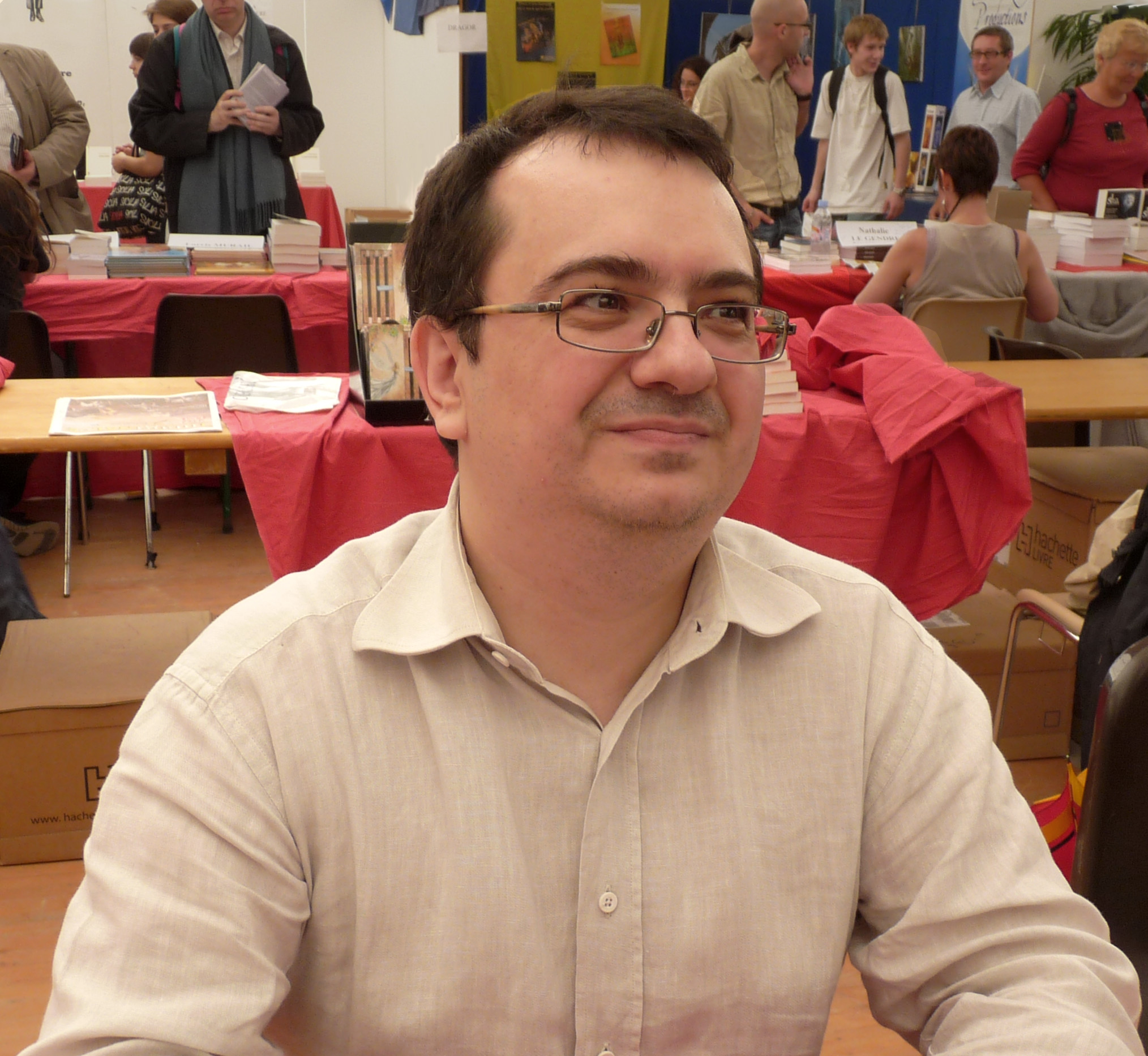
Pevel at Imaginales 2010.

Pierre Pevel (born 1968) is a French science fiction and fantasy writer. He received the Grand Prix de l'Imaginaire for his novel Les Ombres de Wielstadt in 2002.

== Biography ==
Pierre Pevel was born in 1968. He was a scriptwriter and author of role-playing games, before he began writing. He has written many fantasy novels under the pseudonym "Pierre Jacq", often signing his books under his real name. He is known for his trilogy, the Ombres de Wieldstadt, published en 2001, which in 2002 won him a Grand Prix de l'Imaginaire.

Pierre Pevel lives in Nancy, France.

== Bibliography ==
Pierre Pevel's novels are written in a style approaching that of uchronia (or, alternative history), and in particular of fantasy uchronia. The setting is nearly always in a universe strongly inspired by a precise historical period, well documented, but that is different from real world events by the presence of wondrous elements (magic, supernatural creatures). These elements influence the portrayal of the chosen period as people in this world are keenly aware that they coexist with the supernatural and Pevel sometimes provides small changes to actual historical events. However, most of the history present in Pevel's novels is accurate, minus supernatural elements and a few deliberate changes. Pevel's novels are noticeable for always including dragons.

=== Cycle de Wieldstadt ===
- Les Ombres de Wieldstadt, 2001 (Grand Prix de l'Imaginaire 2002, Novel category)
- Les Masques de Wieldstadt, 2002
- Le Chevalier de Wieldstadt, 2004

In the early 17th century, as the Thirty Years' War is beginning to tear the Holy Roman Empire apart, the town of Wieldstadt is protected from assault by the dragon that lives on the mountain overlooking the town. The series revolves around a mysterious knight named Kantz who uses his supernatural abilities to hunt down demonic threats in his city. After returning to the city after a mission accomplished for the Order of the Temple, Kantz must deal with a horde of ghouls who are tracking and killing several people in the town. However, Kantz must also contend with conspiracies in his town by powerful demonic forces and officials working for the shadowy Vehmic court.

A work of alternate history, Pevel introduces small divergences from actual history into the books such as the resurgence of the Templars who were disbanded in the 14th century and never reappeared, as well as making the Vehmic court more powerful than it actually was.

=== Le Paris des Merveilles ===
- Les Enchantements d'Ambremer, 2003
- L'Elixir d'oubli, 2004 (Prix Imaginales 2005, French novel category)
- Le Royaume Immobile

The 'Paris des Merveilles' happens in an alternate Belle Époque France. Three Worlds have coexisted for centuries while partially or completely aware of one another: Earth, the OutreMonde and Onirie, the world of dreams. After the end of the Napoleonic Wars in 1815, the faerie kingdom of Ambremer, which dominates the OutreMonde, revealed itself to humanity and, with its various wonders, the existence of magic. Since, Paris has become a meltingpot of human and wonderful cohabitation: the Eiffel Tower, although still designed by Gustave Eiffel for the Exposition Universelle (1889), was built in glowing white wood gifted to the French government by Méliane, the Queen of the Fairies. Sirens live in the Seine, winged cats fly in the skies and alleys, and sleep on written texts to live their words in dreams, trees from the OutreMonde give light to the Champs-Elysées when night comes, and all sorts of creatures, from gnomes to ogres live in the French capital. And human mages now live openly, able to practice their arts free from the dangers of persecution.

The story follows Louis Denizart Hippolyte Griffont, a mage from the Cyan Circle (one of the three circles of magic) who assist Parisians with magical related problems, and his estranged wife, Baroness Isabel de Saint-Gil, a fairie formerly belonging to Queen Méliane's ladies-in-waiting and now a professional thief, as they deal in the world of intrigues that lurk beneath the wonders of Paris. The OutreMonde is still recovering from a war for domination between the fairies and the dragons, a war the fairies won but leaving wounds that could still be reopened. Several dragons, unwilling to submit to Ambremer's rule, chose exile on Earth rather than stay in the 'OutreMonde'. And Méliane's hold on the throne is constantly tested by the presence of the Dark Queen, a renegade fae who desires to overthrow her.

=== Les Lames du Cardinal (The Cardinal's Blades) ===
- Les Lames du Cardinal, 2007
- L'Alchimiste des ombres, 2009
- Le Dragon des Arcanes, 2010

The "Lames du Cardinal" are a group of mousquetares and agents working for Cardinal de Richelieu, the prime minister of French king Louis XIII. Disbanded after the disastrous failure of the Siege of La Rochelle (a divergence from history in which the siege was successful), the Blades are reassembled by the Cardinal to track down the missing son of a Spanish noble just as the French and Spanish are conducting secret peace negotiations as the Thirty Years' War in the Holy Roman Empire is growing to include foreign powers. Meanwhile, a secret organisation of dragon-sorcerers are planning to expand their ever-growing power into France and will soon come across the path of their old enemies, the Cardinal's Blades.

Pevel's historical accuracy is joined to an existing supernatural threat with the presence of dragons. They once ruled the world under the leadership of powerful entities called the Ancestral Dragons, who the current dragons are descended from and whom they worship as deities. The souls of these ancient dragons are contained in Soul Stones which the dragons use to bind their humans followers to them, which insures their complete allegiance and a new power source for the Ancestral Dragon. An ancient organization called the Dark Claw (Griffe Noire) is attempting to reestablish draconic hegemony over the world by using magic to make dragons assume human form. Each power in the world have a draconic lodge of humans led by a dragon and bound to the spirit of an Ancestral Dragon. France is one of the only countries that has not been invaded by dragons due to the protection of a Church order, the Sisters of Saint-George.

=== Haut-Royaume (A Tale from the High Kingdom) ===
- Le Chevalier, 2013
- L'Héritier, 2014
- Le Roi, 2018
- L'Adversaire, 2020
- L'Emissaire, 2021

As the High Kingdom is facing both external and internal strife, the dying High King Erklant II orders the release of Lorn Askariàn from the haunted prison of Dalroth, where he has been imprisoned for three years on charges of treason. Lorn has been declared innocent of his crimes and the King appoints him as First Knight of the Kingdom, a disused title that gives him the authority to speak with the King's voice. He is instructed to rebuild the ancient Onyx Guard which used to protect the monarchs of the High Kingdom until it was dissolved by Erklant I. However, Lorn must contend with old enemies who have much to fear from his release from prison as well as the ambitious Queen Celyane, who has seized power as regent during her husband's illness and will not let Lorn's newfound power destroy her attempts to sign a controversial peace treaty with the High Kingdom's greatest enemy, Yrgäard. However, Lorn must also deal with the malignant Obscure that he has brought back with him from Dalroth and which, if he doesn't learn how to control it, will destroy him.

The first world created entirely by Pevel, the High Kingdom is situated in the world of Imeloria where a constant war between the High Kingdom and Yrgäard has shaped the entire network of inter-kingdom alliances. Yrgäard is the last kingdom of Imeloria still ruled by a dragon, who once ruled the world before the rise of men. Their power was broken when the first High King, Erklant I, defeated Serk'Arn, the Dragon of Destruction, five hundred years before the story begins. However, the once mighty High Kingdom is now on the verge of civil war as a growing faction of noble men led by the Duke of Feln oppose the Queen's regency. The approaching death of the High King also brings about its problems as the matter of succession is likely to be disputed: the Queen would like to see her son Prince Alderan (Alan for short and Lorn's best friend), the High King's younger son, crowned as the new High King, instead of his brother, Prince Yrdel, who is the High King's oldest son and from a previous marriage.

=== English Translations ===
The Cardinal's Blades (Les Lames du Cardinal in French)

- The Cardinal's Blades, 2009
- The Alchemist in the Shadows, 2010
- The Dragon Arcana, 2011

A Tale of the High Kingdom (Haut-Royaume in French)

- Knight: A Tale of the High Kingdom, 2013
