= Callicrates of Sparta =

Spartan soldier who was killed at the Battle of Plataea in 479 BC

Callicrates
- Καλλικράτης
- Born: Sparta
- Died: August 479 BC; Plataea
- Military career
- Allegiance: Sparta
- Rank: Hoplite
- Conflicts: First Persian invasion of Greece Battle of Plataea

Callicrates (Greek: Καλλικράτης) was a Spartan soldier who was killed at the Battle of Plataea in August 479 BC. He is mentioned by Herodotus as the finest and handsomest man of all the Greeks of his time. He was slain by an arrow just before the armies engaged at Plataea, and while the Greeks were waiting till the signs from the sacrifices should be favourable.

According to Herodotus, while Callicrates died he said to a Plataean named Arimnestos (Greek: Αρίμνηστος) that he is not grieved because he died for Greece but he is grieved because he had not proved his strength, and that no deed of valour had been displayed by him.

In Herodotus, his name occurs among the iranes (Spartan youths) who were buried separately from the rest of the Spartiates and from the Helots.
