= Traitor's Blade =

2014 novel by Sebastien de Castell

- First edition cover
- Author: Sebastien de Castell
- Audio read by: Joe Jameson
- Language: English
- Series: The Greatcoats
- Genre: Fantasy; Adventure
- Publisher: Jo Fletcher Books
- Publication date: July 1, 2014
- Publication place: United States
- Media type: Print (hardcover & paperback); E-book; Audiobook
- Pages: 384 (first edition, hardback)
- ISBN: 978-1623658090 (first edition, hardback)
- Followed by: Knight's Shadow

Traitor's Blade is a 2014 swashbuckling novel by Canadian author Sebastien de Castell. It is the first book in de Castell's "Greatcoats" series, which follows the adventures and misfortunes of the titular Greatcoats, the remnants of an ancient order of travelling magistrates and duelists. The second book, titled Knight's Shadow, was published later in 2014, while the third, titled Saint's Blood, was released in 2016. The fourth book, Tyrant's Throne, was released in 2017.

The series revolves around three Greatcoats: Falcio val Mond, the nominal leader of the order and the story's narrator; Kest Murrowson, Falcio's childhood friend and a master swordsman; and Brasti Goodbow, an unparalleled archer with a troubled past. Together, they navigate the political intrigue of the kingdom of Tristia as they strive to carry out the final orders of King Paelis, who was deposed and murdered by Tristia's dukes prior to the events of the series.

The book is written in a style reminiscent of The Three Musketeers, making use of action and adventure elements that take place against a backdrop of political upheaval.

Long before the events of the series, the Greatcoats (named for their iconic garment, a heavy leather coat that provides protection from the elements, storage for myriad items, and even light armor in battle, aside from serving as a uniform) were a respected order. They travelled throughout Tristia, empowered by the king to safeguard the rule of law through a combination of legal scholarship, skillful mediation, and, when necessary, armed combat.

At the opening of "Traitor's Blade", however, the king has been assassinated and the Greatcoats have fallen into ill regard-- "tattercloaks" distrusted and scorned as traitors by the very people they once served. Falcio and his companions wander without aim, trying in vain to follow the vague, secretive final orders given to them by their deceased King, while the Dukes maneuver for ever more power. But when their web of conspiracies threatens a strange little girl with a familiar name, Falcio swears to defend her, no matter the cost.

The author, Sebastien De Castell, is from Vancouver, British Columbia.
