= Christian Cameron =

Canadian novelist (born 1962)

Christian G. Cameron
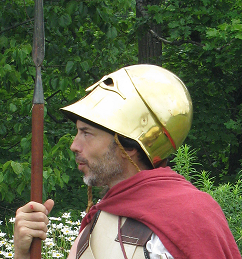
- June 2009
- Born: August 16, 1962 (age 64); Pittsburgh, Pennsylvania, US
- Occupation: Author
- Writing career
- Pen name: Gordon Kent, Miles Cameron
- Period: 1996–present
- Genres: Historical fiction, science fiction
- Website: christiancameronauthor.com

Christian Gordon Cameron (born August 16, 1962), also known as Miles Cameron and Gordon Kent (used for those novels written with his father, author Kenneth Cameron), is a Canadian novelist. He was educated and trained as both a historian and a former career officer in the US Navy. His best-known work is the historical fiction series Tyrant, which by 2009 had sold over 100,000 copies.

== Biography ==
Cameron was born in the US, in Pittsburgh, Pennsylvania, in 1962, and grew up in Rochester, New York, and Iowa City, Iowa, as well as Rockport, Massachusetts. He attended high school at McQuaid Jesuit High School in Rochester, and got an honors BA in Medieval History at the University of Rochester. After University, Cameron joined the United States Navy as an ensign, serving in VS-31 as an air intelligence officer and gaining his air observer wings before going to spend the rest of his military career as a human intelligence officer, first with NCIS and later with the DHS in Washington, DC. Cameron left the US military in 2000 as a lieutenant commander.

Christian and Kenneth Cameron proposed their first novel while Christian was still in the Navy. It was published in 1998 as Night Trap in the UK and Rules of Engagement in the United States. In 2002, Cameron wrote his first solo novel, Washington and Caesar, which was published by HarperCollins in the UK and Random House in the US. Also in 2002, Cameron moved to Canada and married his wife, Sarah. They have one child.

== Fictional works ==
=== Alan Craik series, written with Kenneth Cameron ===
The Alan Craik series of espionage thrillers was conceived by the Camerons on a camping trip in the Adirondacks in 1994-1995, and the events of the first book are very loosely based on the activities of John Anthony Walker and his son, father and son spies working for the Soviet Union against the United States Navy. The Camerons envisioned the books as a modern-day Hornblower series, depicting the life of a modern naval officer from his earliest career until his retirement. Over the course of eight novels, Alan Craik changes from a patriotic, enthusiastic and driven young man to a cynical and ambitious middle-aged man who resigns as a captain to protest the use of intelligence to justify bad political decisions.

=== Tyrant series ===
The Tyrant series was born in the classrooms of the classics department of the University of Toronto, where Cameron decided to write a series of historical novels in 2003. From 2003 to the present, Cameron has written six Tyrant novels: Tyrant (2008), Storm of Arrows (2009), Funeral Games (2010), King of the Bosporus (2011), Destroyer of Cities (2013) and Force of Kings (2014). The Tyrant series is set in the time of Alexander the Great and concerns the history of the Euxine area and the inter-relationships between the Greeks and Scythians. Cameron also produced a single-volume fictional biography of Alexander entitled God of War, which ties into the Tyrant series. God of War was published in 2012.

=== Long War series ===
The Long War series is Cameron's second historical series, also published by Orion in the UK. Cameron's series covers the Persian Wars from the first-person point of view of a historical figure, Arimnestos of Plataea. The first book, Killer of Men (published in 2010), is named after Achilles, the man-killer of the Iliad, and covers in first person the early life of Arimnestos and his participation in the Ionian Revolt. The next installment of the series is Marathon (published in 2011), which culminates in the titular battle. Poseidon's Spear (2013) covers the five years after Marathon and is a more personal tale of adventure, exploration, and revenge across the western Mediterranean and Atlantic Europe. The Great King (2014) has Arimnestos partake in Sparta's diplomatic mission to Persia and ends with the Battle of Artemisium. Salamis (2015) covers the titular battle and The Rage of Ares (2016) ends the series with the battles of Plataea and Mycale. In addition to the battles, the series also features aspects of life in ancient Greece, such as smithery, farming, and sailing, and historical figures such as Heraclitus, Aristides, Gorgo, and Xerxes.

=== Chivalry series ===
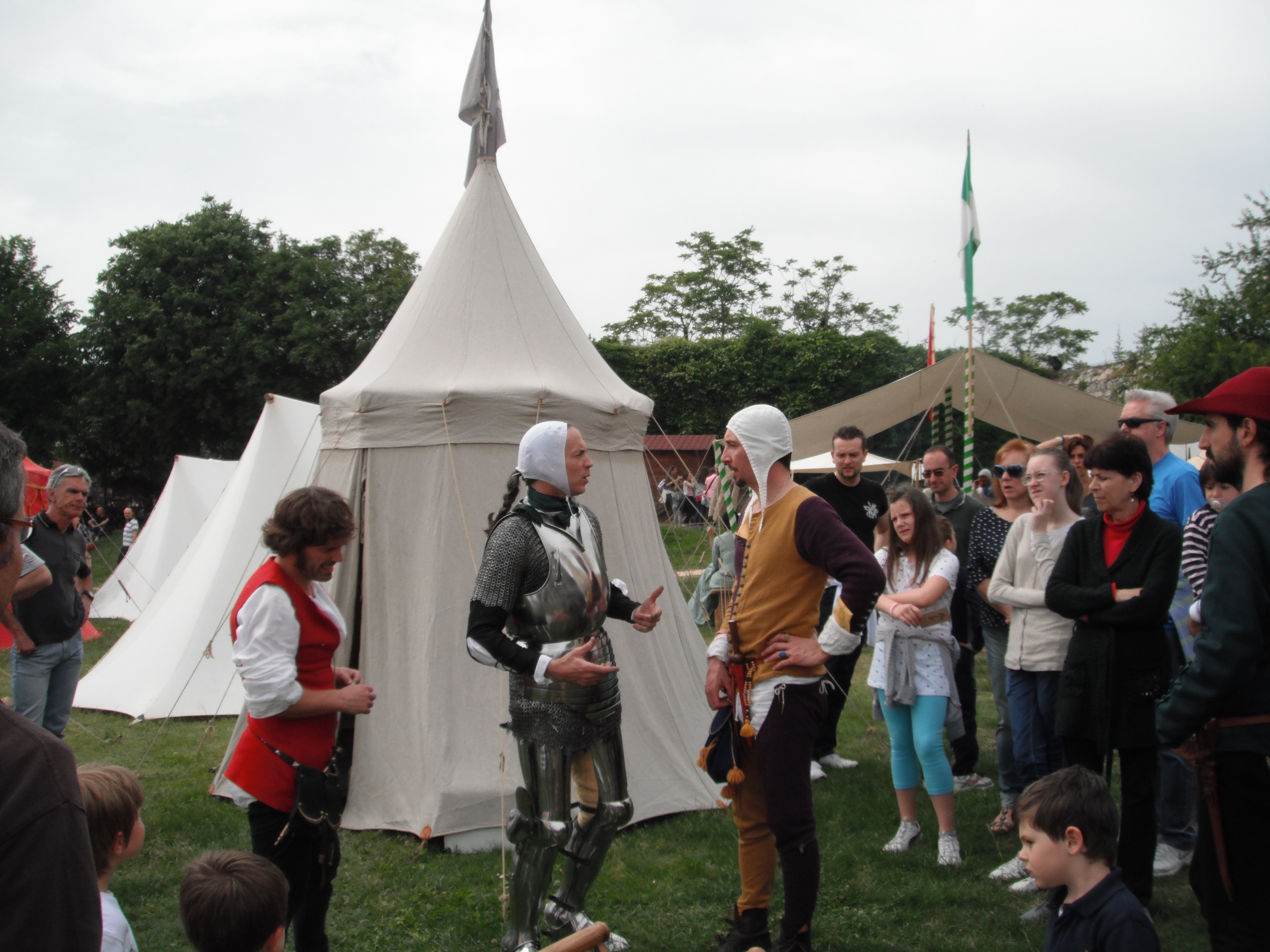
Christian Cameron at a reenactment in Verona, Italy

The Chivalry series is Cameron's third historical series, also published by Orion (May 2013). Based loosely around the exploits of the historical William Gold, one of Sir John Hawkwood's lieutenants in Italy, this series begins with Gold's life as a goldsmith's apprentice in London just after the great plague of 1347 and continues through the Battle of Poitiers, the Savoyard Crusade and the Alexandrian Crusade as well as the War of Chioggia (1379–80) and the Peasants' Revolt of 1381 right through to the Battle of Agincourt in 1415. The series covers aspects of military, political, diplomatic, chivalric, and literary history in England, France, Italy, and Greece, roughly in parallel with the career of Chaucer's knight. A central concern is authentic description of warfare of the period. Significant characters include Geoffrey Chaucer, John Hawkwood and many other historical figures.

=== Traitor Son Cycle ===
Originally planned as a trilogy, and extended to a five book fantasy series with an alternative medieval setting. The major story arc takes the Red Knight from the relative obscurity of command of a little-known mercenary company to fame, international renown, worldly power, and confrontation with the real powers of his world and perhaps with his own belief system.

=== Masters and Mages ===
A magical fantasy alternate medieval setting fictional universe, written after the conclusion of the Traitor Son pentalogy, planned as a trilogy.

=== Arcana Imperii ===
A departure from Cameron's historical and fantasy settings, the Arcana Imperii series is a science fiction space opera. Published as Miles Cameron, the series is set in a far-future human civilization where faster-than-light travel has enabled the settling of many star systems, and enormous Greatships fly trade routes across vast interstellar distances.

== Bibliography ==
=== As Gordon Kent ===
==== Alan Craik series ====
- Night Trap (1998). Published as Rules of Engagement in the USA.
- Peacemaker (2002)
- Top Hook (2002)
- Hostile Contact (2003)
- Force Protection (2004)
- Damage Control (2005)
- The Spoils of War (2006)
- The Falconer's Tale (2007)

=== As Christian Cameron ===
==== Tyrant Series ====
- Tyrant (2008)
- Storm of Arrows (2009)
- Funeral Games (2010)
- King of the Bosporus (2011)
- Destroyer of Cities (2013)
- Force of Kings (2014)

==== Long War Series ====
- Killer of Men (2010)
- Marathon (2011)
- Poseidon's Spear (2012)
- The Great King (2014)
- Salamis (2015)
- The Rage of Ares (2016)
- Treason of Sparta (2023)

==== Chivalry series ====
- The Ill-Made Knight (2013)
- The Long Sword (2014)
- The Green Count (2017)
- Sword of Justice (2018)
- Hawkwood's Sword (2021)
- The Emperor's Sword (2024)
- Captain of Venice (2026)

==== Tom Swan Serials (6 or 7 to a complete novel) ====
- Tom Swan and the Head of St George 1: Castillon (2012)
- Tom Swan and the Head of St George 2: Venice (2012)
- Tom Swan and the Head of St George 3: Constantinople (2012)
- Tom Swan and the Head of St George 4: Rome (2013)
- Tom Swan and the Head of St George 5: Rhodes (2013)
- Tom Swan and the Head of St George 6: Chios (2013)
- Tom Swan and the Siege of Belgrade 1 (2014)
- Tom Swan and the Siege of Belgrade 2 (2014)
- Tom Swan and the Siege of Belgrade 3 (2014)
- Tom Swan and the Siege of Belgrade 4 (2015)
- Tom Swan and the Siege of Belgrade 5 (2015)
- Tom Swan and the Siege of Belgrade 6 (2015)
- Tom Swan and the Siege of Belgrade 7 (2015)
- Tom Swan and Last Spartans 1 (2016)
- Tom Swan and Last Spartans 2 (2016)
- Tom Swan and Last Spartans 3 (2017)
- Tom Swan and Last Spartans 4 (2017)
- Tom Swan and Last Spartans 5 (2017)

==== Commander series ====
- The New Achilles (2019)
- The Last Greek (2020)

==== Other novels ====
- Washington and Caesar (2003)
- God of War (2012)

=== As Miles Cameron ===
==== Traitor Son Cycle ====
- The Red Knight (2012)
- The Fell Sword (2014)
- The Dread Wyrm (2015)
- The Plague of Swords (2016)
- The Fall of Dragons (2017)
- The Messenger's Tale I (2013) — short story prequel to The Red Knight
- The Messenger's Tale II (2014) — short story set between The Fell Sword and The Dread Wyrm

==== Masters and Mages ====
- Cold Iron (2018)
- Dark Forge (2019)
- Bright Steel (2019)

==== The Age of Bronze ====
- Against All Gods (2022)
- Storming Heaven (2023)
- Breaking Hel (2024)

==== Arcana Imperii ====
- Artifact Space (2021)
- Beyond the Fringe: An Arcana Imperii Collection (2023)
- Deep Black (2024)
- Whalesong (2025)
