= The Autumn Republic =

2015 novel by Brian McClellan

- First edition
- Author: Brian McClellan
- Cover artist: Michael Frost; Gene Mollica; Lauren Panepinto
- Language: English
- Series: The Powder Mage trilogy
- Genre: Fantasy
- Publisher: Orbit Books
- Publication date: February 10, 2015
- Publication place: United States
- Media type: Print (hardback & paperback)
- ISBN: 978-0-316-21912-9
- Preceded by: The Crimson Campaign

The Autumn Republic is a fantasy novel by American author Brian McClellan, the third book of The Powder Mage trilogy. It is the sequel to Promise of Blood (2013) and The Crimson Campaign (2014) and was released on February 10, 2015. The audiobook was narrated by Christian Rodska.

== Plot ==
Field Marshal Tamas has returned to Adro after being chased for months behind enemy lines. For the first time in history, the capital of Adro is in the hands of a foreign invader. Reinforcements are weeks away, and friends and foes have become indistinguishable of each other.

Inspector Adamat, still searching for his kidnapped son, finds himself drawn into the very heart of the action, struggling to keep up with the mutiny that has turned the Adran army against itself.

Meanwhile, Taniel Two-Shot is hunted by men he once thought his friends, and finds himself the only hope for Adro.

== Pre-publication ==
On February 21, 2014 McClellan wrote on his blog that he had almost finished the third book. The cover, made by Gene Mollica and Lauren Panepinto of Orbit Books, was revealed on McClellan's official website on February 24, 2014.

== See also ==
- Promise of Blood (2013)
- The Crimson Campaign (2014)
- Brian McClellan
