= The Crimson Campaign =

2014 fantasy novel by Brian McClellan

- Author: Brian McClellan
- Language: English
- Series: The Powder Mage trilogy
- Release number: 2
- Genre: Fantasy
- Publisher: Orbit Books
- Publication date: May 6, 2014
- Publication place: United States
- Media type: Print (hardcover & paperback)
- Pages: 593
- ISBN: 978-0-356-50202-1
- Preceded by: Promise of Blood
- Followed by: The Autumn Republic

The Crimson Campaign is a fantasy novel by American author Brian McClellan, the second book in The Powder Mage trilogy. It was first published by Orbit Books on May 6, 2014, and is the sequel to Promise of Blood (2013). The third and last book, titled The Autumn Republic, was released on February 10, 2015. The audiobook was narrated by Christian Rodska.

== Reception ==
Review of The Crimson Campaign were generally favorable. Publishers Weekly referred to the book as a "swirling sequel" and Staffer’s Book Review stated it was "just great fun." Kirkus Reviews gave a more reserved appraisal stating the "book is less relentlessly inventive than the inaugural volume but still impressively distinctive and pungent…".

Richard Bray, of Fantasy-Faction website, wrote in his review, "In all, The Crimson Campaign is the rare middle book of a trilogy that actually kicks its pace up a notch. It's an amazing work, and has the series well-situated for an outstanding finale in The Autumn Republic due out next year.

== Books in the series ==
- Promise of Blood (2013)
- The Crimson Campaign (2014)
- The Autumn Republic (2015)
