= Promise of Blood =

2013 novel by Brian McClellan

- Cover of first edition (hardcover)
- Author: Brian McClellan
- Cover artist: Gene Mollica and Michael Frost
- Language: English
- Series: The Powder Mage trilogy
- Genre: Fantasy
- Publisher: Orbit Books
- Publication date: 16 April 2013
- Publication place: United States
- Media type: Print (hardcover & paperback)
- Pages: 545
- ISBN: 978-0-316-21903-7
- Followed by: The Crimson Campaign

Promise of Blood is a fantasy novel by American author Brian McClellan, the first book in The Powder Mage trilogy. It was first published by Orbit Books in 2013. A sequel titled The Crimson Campaign was released on May 6, 2014. It won the 2014 Morningstar Award for Best Fantasy Newcomer. The audiobook was narrated by Christian Rodska.

== Background and setting ==
The novel takes place in the kingdom of Adro, one of the Nine Kingdoms founded by Kresimir, a semi-mythical figure now worshiped, along with his nine siblings, as a deity. Magic users are usually divided into three classes:

- Knacked are the least powerful, with few or no active magical powers; instead, they have a variety of uncanny abilities;
- Powder Mages are wizards with the ability to metabolize gunpowder and use it as fuel for various magical powers, including telekinesis; they can also manipulate gunpowder, such as causing it to explode spontaneously;
- Privileged are powerful sorcerers; being exceedingly rare, they are almost exclusively gathered into "Royal Cabals" in direct service to the Nine Kingdoms' various monarchs.

== Plot ==
=== Prologue ===
Field Marshal Tamas has just committed a brutal coup against Adro's monarchy. To ensure the success of his coup, he orders the assassination of every member of the Royal Cabal, all of whom utter the same mysterious phrase as they are killed: "You can't break Kresimir's Promise". Concerned about what this could mean, Tamas summons Adamat, a former soldier and police inspector who is now a private investigator, to the Skyline Palace in the center of the capital city of Adopest, as the coup is unfolding. The field marshal instructs Adamat to find what the words mean and what the threat could mean for the future. Tamas arrests Manhouch XII, the current King of Adro, and his queen while his soldiers round up the nobles present in the city. During the purge, a young laundress named Nila, who worked for one of Manhouch's cousins, is saved from rape by a sergeant named Olem, and escapes the purge with the duke's son, Jakob.

The next day, Manhouch, his queen and many of the arrested nobles are executed by guillotine, ending the monarchy in Adro and leading the country on the path to civil war.

=== Adamat ===
Adamat conducts his investigation while also dealing with his own issues; his attempt to start a printing press business had failed and he had fallen into debt with some dangerous people, reporting to a mysterious employer. In order to ensure their safety from his creditors but also to protect them from the growing unrest, Adamat sends his wife and children away from Adopest.

As he researches the source of the Royal Cabal's mysterious words, he discovers that all the books which could have answered his questions have had pages removed, suggesting someone did not want him to find out about it. Adamat eventually travels to the South Pike, a large mountain fortress in southern Adro where he meets with the last remaining member of the Royal Cabal, Privileged Borbador. Borbador explains that "Kresimir's Promise" was a story told among Privileged Cabals, dating from the original founding of the Nine Kingdoms: supposedly, when Kresimir left to resume his travels between the stars, he promised the nine kings he had appointed that he would return if their lines were ever overthrown. Both Adamat and Tamas believe the story to be a myth, but Borbador reveals that a curse was placed on the Cabals to ensure that, if their king was killed, they would be compelled to destroy his killer. As the last surviving member of Manhouch's Cabal, Borbador is magically bound to kill Tamas, or else he will die himself.

=== Taniel ===
Taniel Two-Shot, Tamas's son, returns to Adopest shortly after the coup, accompanied by a Fatrastan savage named Ka-Poel. Taniel is one of the Adrastan army's most proficient powder mages, who, despite being considered an anomaly by most sorcerers in the Nine, have been increasingly used by the Adran military as sharpshooters. Taniel has been aiding the Kingdom of Fatrasta's war for independence from the kingdom of Kez. Taniel's relationship with his father has been strained since his mother's death, and is even more strained since Taniel broke off his engagement to his fiancée, Vlora, another one of Tamas's powder mages, after catching her in bed with a Fatrastran noble (which Tamas suspects was a plot engineered by the Kez).

Back in Adopest, Taniel is instructed by his father to find an uncommonly powerful member of the Royal Cabal who managed to escape during the coup. To assist him, Tamas assigns a Privileged mercenary named Julene, who Taniel struggles to get on with. Taniel, Julene and Ka-Poel corner the Privileged, a woman named Rozalia (who had previously helped Adamat in his investigation), at Adopest University. Julene and Rozalia, who seemingly have a history, engage in a battle of magic of such scale that Taniel begins to wonder about their true nature. Following these events, Tamas gives Taniel another mission: to find and kill Privileged Borbador to prevent him from completing the curse. Despite Taniel's reticence, Julene is assigned to go with him to South Pike.

=== Tamas ===
In Adopest, Tamas forms a council to govern Adro until a permanent replacement for the monarchy can be established:

- Ricard Tumblar, the leader of Adro's largest labor union;
- Lady Winceslav, an Adran noblewoman who leads a powerful mercenary company known as the Wings of Adom;
- Ondraus the Reeve, Manhouch's finance minister;
- A eunuch representing the Proprietor, a major figure in the Adran underworld; and
- Arch-Diocel Charlemund, the leader of the Adran branch of the Kresim Church.

The first challenge comes when a royalist uprising of 20,000 attempts to reestablish the monarchy with young Jakob as a figurehead king, with the remaining nobles acting as his regents. Tamas's forces put down the rebellion and Jakob is taken and seemingly executed. Angered, Nila becomes a domestic servant in Tamas's household, hoping for a chance to assassinate him. She is stopped by Olem, who has been chosen as Tamas's bodyguard (due to his ability to go without sleep), and reveals that Jakob is still alive and will be sent to the countryside to be raised unaware of his claim to the vacant throne. Nila tries to free Jakob but discovers he has been taken by a shadowy figure called Lord Vetas, who coerces her into joining them as the boy's nanny.

After the royalist uprising, Tamas and his council prepare to receive a delegation from Kez. Manhouch had been preparing to sign accords with Kez, effectively turning Adro into a vassal state in exchange for gold to pay off his mounting debts. Tamas is aware that Adro is in a precarious position and cannot currently afford to go to war with Kez again, but his restraint dissolves when the leader of the delegation is revealed to be Duke Nikslaus, the Kez Privileged who personally executed Tamas's wife, Erika. Tamas throws Nikslaus into the ocean and, fully aware that the Kez intentionally sought to provoke war with Adro, prepares his army.

Sometime after the failed negotiation, a Warden (a human mutated by magic and used by the Kez as bodyguards for their Privileged) unsuccessfully attempts to assassinate Tamas in the secret lair beneath the Skyline Palace where he and his co-conspirators had planned the coup. As only he and the members of the council knew where he would be, Tamas hires Adamat again to discover which one of the Councilors is a Kez agent.

=== Taniel (II) ===
At South Pike Mountain, Taniel tracks down Borbador but, at the last moment, cannot bring himself to kill him as they had been brought up together and remain best friends. When Taniel approaches Borbador, they are attacked by an unusually fierce and strong cave lion. Taniel, Borbador and Ka-Poel fight it off with difficulty, Ka-Poel's abilities as a Bone-eye sorcerer giving them an edge.

Borbador reveals to them that the cave lion was Julene, who is not a Privileged, but rather a member of an ancient caste of immortal sorcerers known as Predeii. In mythology it was the Predeii who summoned Kresimir into their world and assisted him with establishing the Nine Kingdoms, acting as advisors to the royal families. The Predeii were thought to have been wiped out during the Bleakening, a world war among all nine kingdoms. Julene, eager for more power, has been planning to summon Kresimir back to the world and use him to establish herself as the main new power.

Shortly after the confrontation, the group find the Kez army marching on South Pike, its Royal Cabal coming to assist Julene in reaching its peak where they will summon Kresimir. Alongside Adro's Mountain Watch, Taniel, Borbador and Ka-Poel fight for months to hold off the Kez forces. At the climax of the summoning ritual, Taniel uses his mage abilities to shoot the resurrected Kresimir directly in the eye, apparently killing him.

== Reception ==
Kirkus Reviews gave the book a starred review stating: "A thoroughly satisfying yarn that should keep readers waiting impatiently for further installments." Publishers Weekly, gave the book a generally positive review, stating "McClellan neatly mixes intrigue and action..."

In 2014, Promise of Blood won the Morningstar Award for Best Fantasy Newcomer. The book's cover, by Gene Mollica and Michael Frost, was also nominated for the Ravenheart Award for Best Fantasy Book Jacket/Artist.

== See also ==
- The Crimson Campaign, the sequel to Promise of Blood
- The Autumn Republic, the third and final volume of the trilogy
