= List of PC games (K) =

The following page is an alphabetical section from the list of PC games.

== K ==
Name	Developer	Publisher	Genre(s)	Operating system(s)	Date released
Katana Zero	Askiisoft	Devolver Digital	Platform, hack and slash	Microsoft Windows, macOS	18 May 2019
Katawa Shoujo	Four Leaf Studios	Four Leaf Studios	Visual novel, dating sim	Microsoft Windows, Linux, macOS	24 January 2012
Kenshi	Lo-Fi Games	Lo-Fi Games	Role-playing video game	Microsoft Windows	6 December 2018
Kentucky Route Zero	Cardboard Computer	Cardboard Computer	Adventure	Microsoft Windows, Linux, macOS	7 January 2013
Kerbal Space Program	Squad	Squad	Sandbox	Microsoft Windows, Linux, macOS	24 June 2011
Kerbal Space Program 2	Squad	Private Division	Space flight simulation	Microsoft Windows	24 February 2023
Kero Blaster	Playism	Daisuke "Pixel" Amaya	Platformer	Microsoft Windows, macOS	11 May 2014
Kill It with Fire	Casey Donnellan Games	TinyBuild	Simulation	Microsoft Windows	13 August 2020
Killing Floor	Tripwire Interactive	Tripwire Interactive	First-person shooter	Microsoft Windows, Linux, macOS	14 May 2009
Killing Floor 2	Tripwire Interactive	Tripwire Interactive	First-person shooter	Microsoft Windows, Linux, macOS	18 November 2016
Killing Floor 3	Tripwire Interactive	Tripwire Interactive	First-person shooter	Microsoft Windows	24 July 2025
Kindergarten	Con Man Games, Sean Young	SmashGames	Puzzle, adventure	Microsoft Windows, macOS, Linux	15 June 2017
King Arthur: The Role-Playing Wargame	NeocoreGames	Paradox Interactive	Turn-based strategy, real-time tactics	Microsoft Windows	25 November 2009
King Arthur II: The Role-Playing Wargame	NeocoreGames	Paradox Interactive	Turn-based strategy, real-time tactics	Microsoft Windows	27 January 2012
King of Crabs	Robot Squid, Spilt Milk Studios	Robot Squid	Battle royale video game	Microsoft Windows	3 July 2020
Kingdom: New Lands	Noio	Raw Fury	Strategy, Adventure	Microsoft Windows, Linux, macOS	9 August 2016
Kingdom Come: Deliverance	Warhorse Studios	Deep Silver; Warhorse Studios	Action role-playing	Microsoft Windows	13 February 2018
Kingdom Come: Deliverance II	Warhorse Studios	Deep Silver	Action role-playing	Microsoft Windows	11 February 2025
Kingdoms of Amalur: Reckoning	38 Studios, Big Huge Games	38 Studios, Electronic Arts	Action role-playing, hack and slash	Microsoft Windows	7 February 2012
Kizuna Encounter: Super Tag Battle "4Way Battle Version"	SNK, Code Mystics	SNK	Fighting, Co-op video game	Microsoft Windows	11 October 2025
kkrieger	.theprodukkt	.theprodukkt	First-person shooter	Microsoft Windows	30 April 2004
Knights and Merchants: The Shattered Kingdom	Joymania Entertainment	TopWare Interactive, Interactive Magic	RTS	Microsoft Windows, Linux	18 September 1998
Kusan: City of Wolves	CIRCLEfromDOT	PQube	Top-down shooter	Microsoft Windows	30 July 2026
