= Dark fantasy =

Subgenre of fantasy

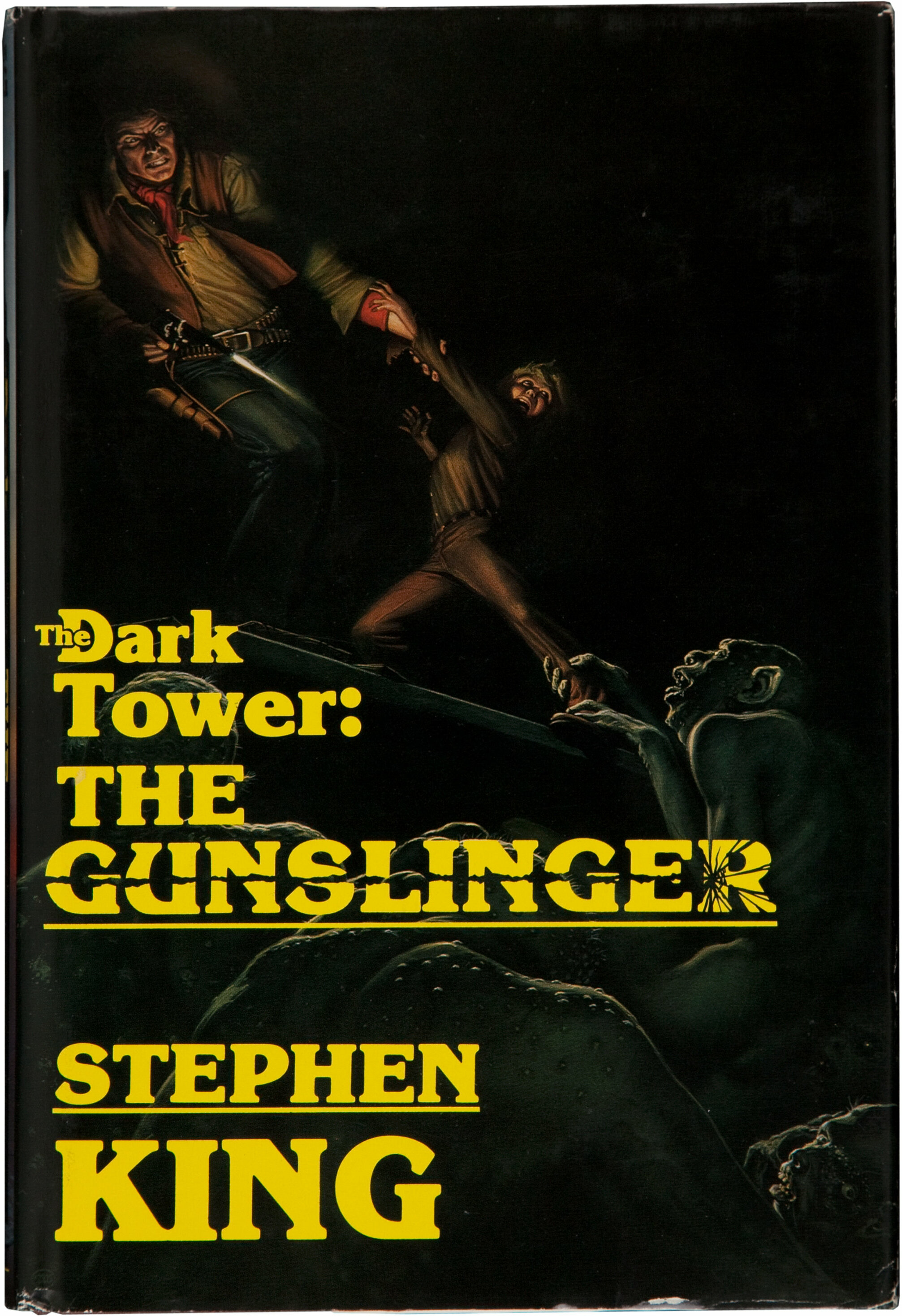
The cover of The Gunslinger, the first volume of The Dark Tower series by Stephen King

Dark fantasy is a subgenre of fantasy works that incorporates magical and supernatural elements with the grim, unsettling, and macabre atmosphere of horror fiction. The term is ambiguously used to describe stories that combine horror elements with one or another of the standard formulae of fantasy.

== Definition ==
A strict definition for dark fantasy is difficult to pin down. Gertrude Barrows Bennett has been called "the woman who invented dark fantasy". Both Charles L. Grant and Karl Edward Wagner are credited with having coined the term "dark fantasy"—although the two authors were describing different styles of fiction. Brian Stableford argues "dark fantasy" can be usefully defined as subgenre of stories that attempt to "incorporate elements of horror fiction" into the standard formulae of fantasy stories. Stableford also suggests that supernatural horror set primarily in the real world is a form of "contemporary fantasy", whereas supernatural horror set partly or wholly in "secondary worlds" should be described as "dark fantasy".

Additionally, other authors, critics, and publishers have adopted dark fantasy to describe various other works. However, these stories rarely share universal similarities beyond supernatural occurrences and a dark, often brooding, tone. As a result, dark fantasy cannot be solidly connected to a defining set of tropes. The term itself may refer collectively to tales that are either horror-based or fantasy-based.

Some writers also use "dark fantasy" (or "Gothic fantasy") as an alternative description to "horror", because they feel the latter term is too lurid or vivid.

== Concept and history ==
Charles L. Grant is often cited as having coined the term "dark fantasy". Grant defined his brand of dark fantasy as "a type of horror story in which humanity is threatened by forces beyond human understanding". He often used dark fantasy as an alternative to horror, as horror was increasingly associated with more visceral works.

Dark fantasy is sometimes also used to describe stories told from a monster's point of view, or that present a more sympathetic view of supernatural beings usually associated with horror. Anne Rice's The Vampire Chronicles, Chelsea Quinn Yarbro's Saint-Germain, and Neil Gaiman's The Sandman are early examples of this style of dark fantasy. This is in contrast to the traditional horror model, which focuses more on the victims and survivors.

In a more general sense, dark fantasy is occasionally used as a synonym for supernatural horror, to distinguish horror stories that contain elements of the supernatural from those that do not. For example, a story about a werewolf or vampire could be described as dark fantasy, while a story about a serial killer would simply be horror.

Stableford suggests that the type of horror conveyed by fantasy stories such as William Beckford's Vathek and Edgar Allan Poe's The Masque of the Red Death "is more aesthetic than visceral or existential", and that such stories should be considered "dark fantasies" rather than the "supernaturalized thrillers" of conventional horror fiction.

Karl Edward Wagner is often credited for creating the term "dark fantasy" when used in a more fantasy-based context. Wagner used it to describe his fiction about the Gothic warrior Kane. Since then, "dark fantasy" has sometimes been applied to sword and sorcery and high fantasy fiction that features anti-heroic or morally ambiguous protagonists. Another good example under this definition of dark fantasy is Michael Moorcock's saga of the albino swordsman Elric.

The fantasy work of H. P. Lovecraft, Clark Ashton Smith and their emulators have been specified as "dark fantasy", since the imaginary worlds they depicted contain many horror elements.

Dark fantasy is occasionally used to describe fantasy works by authors whom the public primarily associates with the horror genre. Examples of these are Stephen King's The Dark Tower series, Peter Straub's Shadowland and Clive Barker's Weaveworld. Alternatively, dark fantasy is sometimes used for "darker" fiction written by authors best known for other styles of fantasy; Raymond Feist's Faerie Tale and Charles de Lint's novels written as Samuel M. Key would fit here.

Roald Dahl's novel The Witches (and its film adaptations) is described as dark fantasy. Dahl's poetic reworking of "Cinderella" (which features in his poetry collection Revolting Rhymes) sees him upend the happy tale.

=== Grimdark fantasy ===
According to Adam Roberts, grimdark is an "anti-Tolkien" approach to fantasy writing. George R. R. Martin's popular grimdark fantasy series A Song of Ice and Fire is characterized, in Roberts' view, by its reaction to Tolkien's idealism, even though it owes much to Tolkien. According to Jon Garrad, grimdark is associated with the gothic movement of the 1990s and its negativity and emphasis on loss.

Writing in The Guardian in 2016, Damien Walter summarized what he considered grimdark's "domination" of the fantasy genre as "bigger swords, more fighting, bloodier blood, more fighting, axes, more fighting", and a "commercial imperative to win adolescent, male readers". He saw this trend as being in opposition to "a truly epic and more emotionally nuanced kind of fantasy" that delivered storytelling.

Grimdark fantasy has been written since the 1980s by authors including Michael Moorcock, Glen Cook, George R. R. Martin, Joe Abercrombie, Richard K. Morgan, Paul Kearney, Mark Lawrence, Michael R. Fletcher, and Anna Smith Spark. In a broader sense, the "pervasively gritty, bleak, pessimistic, or nihilistic view of the world" characteristic of grimdark fiction is found in much popular fiction from the 2000s, including Batman comics, the television series Breaking Bad, and the media franchise The Walking Dead.

== Other media ==
=== Anime and manga ===
Berserk, a manga and anime franchise by Kentaro Miura that debuted in 1989, has been described by Dark Horse Comics and the Anime News Network as an example of the genre.

Attack on Titan is a dark fantasy for its intense violence and the dystopian world it takes place in.

=== Films ===
Ridley Scott's film Legend (1985) has been described as a "dark fairy tale" fantasy film. Guillermo del Toro's fantasy film Pan's Labyrinth (2006) has been described as a "sort of a dark spin on Alice in Wonderland".

=== Video games ===
The 2013 fantasy action role-playing game Dragon's Crown contains many elements of dark fantasy, such as werewolves, vampires, zombies, homonculi, and human-monster hybrids.

Modern games from Japanese game development and publishing company FromSoftware are lauded as exceptional representations of the dark fantasy genre, notably the Dark Souls series along with Bloodborne and later Elden Ring.

== See also ==
- Dark fantasy anime and manga
- Dark fantasy video games
- Dark fantasy role-playing games
- Dark fantasy role-playing video games
- Grimdark
- Paranormal fiction
- Occult detective
- Science fantasy
- Splatterpunk
- Supernatural fiction
- Urban fantasy
- Weird fiction
