= Half a Soul =

2020 Regency fantasy romance novel by Olivia Atwater

- Cover for the Orbit edition.
- Author: Olivia Atwater
- Cover artist: Matthew Burne
- Language: English
- Series: Regency Faerie Tales
- Genre: Regency romance; Fantasy romance
- Set in: Regency era
- Publisher: Starwatch Press, Orbit Books
- Publication date: 16 June 2020 (first paperback edition)
- Media type: Ebook, paperback
- Pages: 258 (first paperback edition)
- Followed by: Ten Thousand Stitches
- Website: https://oliviaatwater.com

Half a Soul is a Regency fantasy romance novel written by Olivia Atwater. It is the first installment in her Regency Faerie Tales trilogy. The novel follows Theodora "Dora" Ettings, a girl unable to feel and express her emotions since the faerie Lord Hollowvale stole half of her soul. After moving to London, Dora meets the royal magician Elias Wilder, who promises to help her find a cure. However, he is busy investigating a mysterious sleeping plague that is spreading among children in the workhouses. Dora joins the investigation, which will lead her to confront Lord Hollowvale once again.

Atwater published Half a Soul on her own in 2020, before it was acquired by Orbit Books and re-released in 2022. Reviewers appreciated its cozy atmosphere that contrasts with the portrayal of the darker side of London during the period.

== Development and publication ==
Olivia Atwater submitted her first novel to a publishing company at the age of twelve, but later decided to pursue different careers and continue writing in her spare time. The first idea for Half a Soul came from a singular scene where the protagonist washes her gown in a fountain during a ball. Atwater said: "I just had the idea that she was a Regency lady who felt and acted as though she were in a dream, and I knew it was going to be difficult for her because that sort of thing would not do well in an era of strict manners." While researching the Regency period, she decided to also portray the struggles of the lower social classes, introducing a more serious element to the story.

After researching self-publishing, Atwater followed a friend's advice and published Half a Soul on her own in 2020. It was the first installment in her Regency Faerie Tales trilogy, later followed by Ten Thousand Stitches and Longshadow. Orbit Books acquired the English rights for all three novels in 2022 from Christable McKinley at David Higham Associates. The ebook editions were released in April 2022, while the new paperback edition of Half a Soul was published in June 2022. Matthew Burne illustrated the new covers for all the novels. German and French rights were sold to CBJ and Albin Michel, respectively.

== Plot ==
During the Regency era, Theodora "Dora" Eloisa Charity Ettings lives with her aunt and uncle, Lady and Lord Lockheed, and their daughter Vanessa in the English countryside after her parents' death. Dora wanders into the woods and encounters the faerie Lord Hollowvale, who claims Dora's mother sold her to him and tries to steal her soul. However, Vanessa stabs him with a pair of iron scissors and the faerie escapes with only half of Dora's soul. Dora has now heterochromatic eyes and is unable to feel and express most of her emotions. Her aunt says she is cursed and urges them to keep the secret to avoid bringing shame on their family. Fearing the faerie might come back, Vanessa gives the scissors to Dora for protection.

Years later, her aunt is trying to find a husband for Vanessa, who suggests moving their search to London. They stay at Lady Hayworth's house and both ladies exclude Dora from preparations for future balls. While exploring London, Dora ends up in a magic shop where she sees a glimpse of the future in a mirror: she is wearing a gown stained with what seems to be blood. She also meets the royal magician, Elias Wilder, and Lady Carroway's third son, physician Albert Lowe, who invites her to a ball. Dora's aunt and Lady Hayworth suggest she seduce Albert, while Vanessa will charm his eldest brother, Edward, set to inherit the title of viscount. At the ball, her vision becomes true, but the blood ends up being just spilled punch. Vanessa reveals Dora's secret to the royal magician, hoping he might find a cure. Elias promises to help, but he is also preoccupied with a sleeping plague that is afflicting children in the workhouses.

To elude the ladies' strict control, Elias fakes interest in Dora and gives her an enchanted mirror, which allows her to contact him. After having tested her, Elias tells Dora that her divinatory powers are so strong that she might be able to reach him through a common mirror. In the enchanted mirror, Dora sees Elias' past: he was badly injured during the Napoleonic Wars and was saved by Albert. Dora visits a workhouse, run by the cruel George Ricks, with Albert and her chaperone, Miss Jennings, and is shocked by the living conditions. Albert calls Elias when he finds another victim of the plague, a girl named Abigail, and he brings her to an orphanage funded by Lady Carroway's society. Dora decides to help the magician in his search for a cure by interviewing children at different workhouses.

Albert invites Dora's family to a private dinner, where Elias barges in and angrily discusses about social injustice, almost offending Albert's mother. After Dora calms him down, Elias tells her he is in part faerie and escaped his land due to the faeries' cruelty, but found himself in an equally cruel place. Dora and Elias grow closer, while Edward proposes to Vanessa. Dora's aunt decides to send her back to the countryside to prevent her causing a scandal. Dora tries to reach Elias through a common mirror, but she ends up in the faeries' land, where she discovers that her other half, Abigail and the other sick children are held captive by Lord Hollowvale, who cruelly educates them following what he believes to be English norms. He tells Dora that the children were sold to him by George Ricks.

Dora is captured, but manages to inform Elias. Lord Hollowvale organizes a ball to provoke strong emotions in Dora and thus reunite the two halves. Elias arrives and challenges him to a duel. Dora stabs Lord Hollowvale with her scissors, while her other half claims the title of Lady Hollowvale, preventing the union of the two. Dora and Abigail wake up at home, while Lady Hollowvale looks after the children that couldn't return home. Elias proposes to Dora and Albert to Miss Jennings. George Ricks is arrested and Dora opens an orphanage with the help of Miss Jennings and Lady Carroway.

== Reception ==
A review for Publishers Weekly called Half a Soul a "sweet" and "low-stakes" fantasy romance, in which Atwater mixes "romance tropes with fairy tale elements, while not shying away from the darker side of Regency London". Writing for The British Fantasy Society, Nigel Robert Wilson described the novel as a "a pleasing mixture of characters and circumstances written to delight and amuse". Wilson appreciated the inclusion of a more realistic vision of the period and identified Elias as the true hero of the story.

Jenny Hamilton of Tor.com said it is an "endearing" traditional Regency romance novel with fantasy elements, influenced by Sorcery and Cecelia (1988) and Jonathan Strange & Mr Norrell (2004), meant to "enhance its central metaphors". Hamilton interpreted Dora's condition as an unconventional metaphor for neurodivergence, but still placed the character in a long tradition of "misfits heroines": female protagonists who do not fit in society and challenge some of its norms, but do not question its basis and end up reconciling with it. The novel was Atwater's first entry in the Self-Published Fantasy Blog-Off.
