= Deathtrap (video game) =

2015 video game

- Digital release logo
- Developer: NeocoreGames
- Publisher: NeocoreGames
- Platforms: Microsoft Windows, Mac OS X, Xbox One, PlayStation 4
- Release: Microsoft Windows, Mac OS X; 4 February 2015; Xbox One; 3 January 2017; PlayStation 4; 28 September 2020
- Genres: tower defense action role-playing game
- Modes: single player multiplayer (cooperative and versus)

Deathtrap is a tower defense/action RPG video game released in 2015 by NeocoreGames for Microsoft Windows and Mac OS X. It shares the gothic fiction setting with NeocoreGames' The Incredible Adventures of Van Helsing and features a lone protagonist who is sent to a border world in an alternate dimension ("Ink") to defend a series of ancient strongholds against a horde of monsters invading from the depths of that dimension and trying to break through to the physical world.

The Xbox One version was released on 3 January 2017 under the title The World of Van Helsing: Deathtrap. NeocoreGames released a PlayStation 4 port on 28 September 2020.

== Gameplay ==
The player chooses a character out of three possible classes (warrior, sorceress, or marksman) which determine the action aspect of the game, and progresses through levels fighting off hordes of enemies. Each map features a number of pre-set routes for enemies that come in waves, and slots for building various trap types. Those are built and upgraded using the mystical currency "essence" with predetermined amount at the start of each level. Essence can be gained during the level by killing enemies and completing waves, and spent to build new traps or upgrade existing ones. The player wins if they kill all the enemies in a level and loses if a certain number of enemies manage to reach the base portal. Trap actions that damage and kill enemies are augmented by the player's attacks where the character can move across the map freely, whereas traps are stationary and have a limited range.

Role-playing elements come into play between levels where the player can upgrade their character on the basis of experience points received, and buy or craft equipment to provide a boost in abilities (either action- or trap-building related). Some trap types and trap upgrades must also be unlocked separately.

The basic story mode features 13 levels, but after the player's character has gained enough experience, two additional modes are unlocked: scenario and endless. The scenario mode allows the player to increase map difficulty by selecting various restrictions, while "endless" is a non-stop survival mode with limited resources and increasingly tough enemies. Deathtrap also features a multiplayer mode (cooperative and versus for up to 4 players) and a map editor.

== Reception ==
Reception

Aggregate score
Aggregator	Score
Metacritic	PC: 77/100; XONE: 80/100

Some reviewers have noted close similarity of the action aspect to Diablo series of games, and that the tower defense aspect likewise doesn't introduce anything significant compared to existing such games, but the genre mix was considered innovative and refreshing.

The game has received generally favourable reviews and has a metascore of 77 on Metacritic (PC version).
