= Warhammer 40,000: Inquisitor – Martyr =

- Developer: NeocoreGames
- Publisher: NeocoreGames (Note: Versions for PlayStation 5 and Xbox Series X/S are published by Nacon)
- Platforms: Microsoft Windows; PlayStation 4 Xbox One; PlayStation 5 Xbox Series X/S
- Release: Microsoft Windows; June 5, 2018; PS4, Xbox One; August 23, 2018; PS5, Xbox Series X/S; October 27, 2022
- Genre: Action role-playing
- Modes: Single-player, multiplayer

Warhammer 40,000: Inquisitor – Martyr is an action role-playing video game developed and published by NeocoreGames for Microsoft Windows on June 5, 2018, for the PlayStation 4 and Xbox One on August 23, 2018, and for PlayStation 5 and Xbox Series X/S on October 27, 2022. It takes place in the setting for the wargaming franchise Warhammer 40,000 created by Games Workshop.

== Gameplay ==
The gameplay uses a top-down camera and focuses heavily on action, both melee and ranged, it has a leveling system and different playable character classes. Based on this, the game has been frequently compared to Diablo. The game uses a cover system for both the players and enemies, and features destructible environments. The game can be played both solo and in co-op.

There are four playable classes in this game: the Psyker has powerful area-attack and debuff spells; the Crusader is slow but heavily armored; the Assassin is fast and deadly but lightly-armored; and the Tech-Adept (expansion only) summons robotic minions to fight alongside him.

== Plot ==
=== Setting and characters ===
The game is set in the fictional universe of Warhammer 40,000. The player character is a member of the Inquisition, a secret police force tasked with fighting Chaos worship and alien influence in the Imperium. The game takes place in the Caligari Sector, which was created by NeocoreGames specifically for this game.

=== Martyr (original game) ===
The game begins with the discovery of an abandoned battleship seemingly appearing out of nowhere in the Caligari Sector, which sends the Inquisitor to investigate the ghost ship. Upon arrival, the Inquisitor's transport is shot down by the ghost ship's automated defenses, which forces the Inquisitor to crash land on the hangar deck. The initial investigation of the ghost ship reveals that it is the Martyr, a Fortress Monastery that disappeared 5,000 years ago and was commanded by Lord Inquisitor Uther Tiberius, and encounters an Adeptus Astartes, Caius Thorn, who claims to be led by Lord Inquisitor Klosterheim and that his expedition arrived shortly after the Martyr reappeared; however, the expedition became stranded after the Martyr activated a jamming signal to prevent them from gaining access to the lower decks. After Thorn and the Inquisitor disable the jamming signal, Thorn is seriously hurt in combat and the warp drives on the Martyr suddenly activate and the Inquisitor teleports off the ship. As the Martyr disappears into the Warp, the Inquisitor pledges to save Thorn in order to learn how to track down the Martyr.

The Inquisitor travels to the Merciful Agony Void Station in search of a Magos Biologis after resolving a nearby Chaos incursion. Once Thorn is revived from stasis, he leads the Inquistor to a sect of Adeptus Mechanicus Tech-priests located on Kardian II, and rescues Artificer Omicron Arkh of the Requisitional Expedition Epsilon-26, who uses an artifact to locate Klosterheim, still aboard the Martyr.

Upon arriving back on the Martyr, and confronting Klosterheim, it is revealed that the Inquisitor is Klosterheim's former superior who gave him orders to secure the Martyr and locate Uther Tiberius' greatest secret: a being known as the Alpha Pariah. To avoid censure, the Inquisitor voluntarily wiped all of their memories.

After locating Tiberius' tomb and rosette and returning to the Martyr, which is again under siege from numerous Chaos elements. It is revealed through investigation that Uther Tiberius made a pact with a Greater Daemon known as the Thing in the Walls, the Unclean One in order to artificially create the Alpha Pariah and use her attempt to rule the dimension known as the Warp. The Alpha Pariah is a unique holder of the Pariah Gene, where she not only is able to completely resist daemon possession and influence, but also completely destroy the essence of a daemon by her mere presence. As the Inquisitor attempts to escort the Alpha Pariah, the Machine Spirit of the Martyr intervenes, separating the Alpha Pariah and the Inquisitor and starting up the ship's Warp Drive. The Inquisitor teleports to their ship and can do nothing as they watch the Martyr make a warp jump. After it is gone, the Inquisitor vows to find the Martyr again the next time it reappears.

=== Prophecy (expansion) ===
The Martyr unexpectedly reappears in realspace, and the Inquisitor boards the ship again in search of the Alpha Pariah. He encounters Eldar from the Craftworld Tuathal, who are also there for the Alpha Pariah. They want to use her to cleanse their Chaos-infested Craftworld. The Inquisitor also encounters an Eldar Harlequin, who claims to be merely observing the drama. The Inquisitor rescues the Alpha Pariah and brings her to safety on board van Wynter's ship.

The Inquisitor also runs into a clone of Fabius Bile, a Chaos Space Marine and mad scientist. Bile claims he helped Uther Tiberius create the Alpha Pariah, but then Tiberius betrayed Bile; Bile claims the Alpha Pariah as rightfully his.

The Harlequin tells the Inquisitor of a very ancient prophecy concerning the Alpha Pariah. The Alpha Pariah's destiny is to close the Dark Nexus, which is a growing Warp rift in the Caligari Sector that could eventually become as large as the Eye of Terror. This would mean a new entry point by which Chaos warships could invade Imperium space. The prophecy mentions an artefact called the "Crown of Emptiness", created by a vanished xenos race known as the Fabricatus, which will allow the Alpha Pariah to control her powers. The Inquisitor tracks down the Crown of Emptiness to the ancient homeworld of the Fabricatus. After the Inquisitor gives the Crown to the Alpha Pariah, the Harlequin shows up and attempts to take the Alpha Pariah for herself. The Inquisitor slays the Harlequin.

In order to placate a fellow agent from the Ordo Hereticus, the Inquisitor agrees to hunt and assassinate the clone of Fabius Bile with the Alpha Pariah's help. After the Bile clone is slain, the Alpha Pariah pilots the Martyr into the Dark Nexus, which seals it.

== Development and release ==
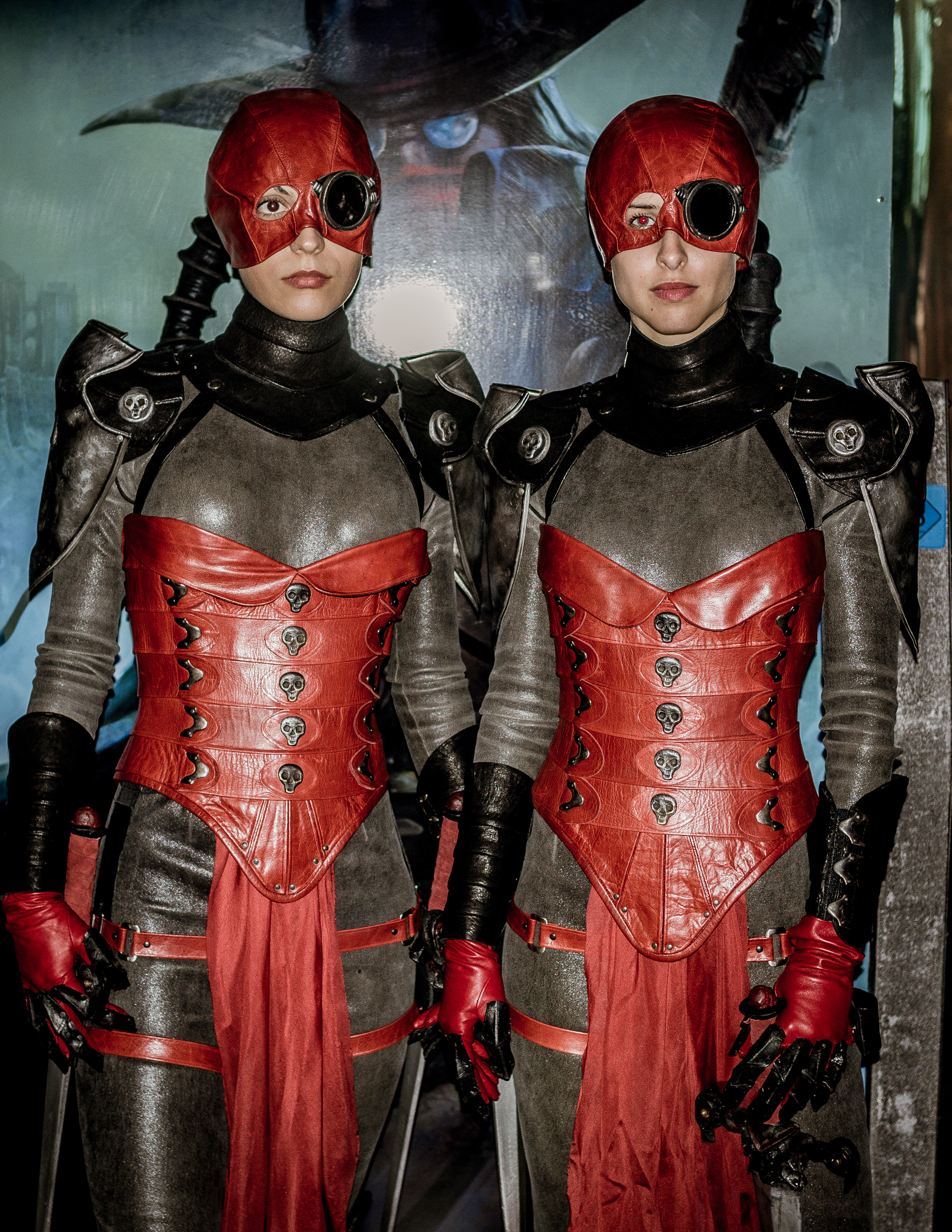
Promotion at Gamescom 2015

The game was announced in 2015. It was released on June 5, 2018 for Microsoft Windows. The PlayStation 4 and Xbox One versions were released on August 23, 2018, and versions published by Nacon for PlayStation 5 and Xbox Series X/S are set to release in 2022.

== Prophecy (expansion) ==
Prophecy, a stand-alone expansion for Warhammer 40,000: Inquisitor – Martyr, released on July 30, 2019 on PC. It released to PlayStation 4 and Xbox One on February 13, 2020.

It introduced a fourth class, The Tech-Adept Inquisitor, who is capable of summoning and controlling a variety of robotic constructs. The expansion continued the story of the original game's campaign with additional chapters and introduced new missions, enemies, and environments.

Critics praised the addition of the Tech-Adept class for offering a different gameplay style, but some noted that the expansion retained some of the original game's repetitive mission design. The expansion received generally positive to mixed reviews, with particular commendation for its deepening of the game's mechanics and world-building.

== Reception ==
Warhammer 40,000: Inquisitor – Martyr received mixed reviews from critics upon release.

Reception

Aggregate score
Aggregator	Score
Metacritic	PC: 67/100; PS4: 65/100; XONE: 71/100

Reviewers praised the game's atmosphere depiction of the Warhammer 40,000 universe and its detailed environments. However, criticism was directed at the game's repetitive missions, technical performance issues, and pacing problems.

IGN described the game as a faithful but uneven translation of the grimdark setting, noting its strong customization systems but also highlighting the lack of mission variety. PC Gamer also commented on the game's combat needs "polishing" and "isn't up to standard," also commenting that it's "a grind-heavy campaign that tests player patience."
