= Kindergarten (disambiguation) =

Kindergarten is a form of education for young children.

Kindergarten may also refer to:

- Kindergarten (1989 film), an Argentinian film directed by Jorge Polaco; adapted from a novel by Asher Benatar
- Kindergarten (1983 film), a Soviet drama film
- Kindergarten (2025 film), a Canadian documentary film directed by Jean-François Caissy
- Kindergarten (horse) (born 1937), thoroughbred racehorse from New Zealand
- Kindergarten (TV series), US documentary television broadcast by HBO in 2001
- Kindergarten (video game), a 2017 puzzle adventure videogame
- Kindergarten, Peter Rushforth's debut novel, published in 1979
- "Kindergarten", a song from Faith No More's fourth studio album, Angel Dust (1992)
- Reception (school), the first year of primary school in England, Wales, and South Australia; called kindergarten in New South Wales

== See also ==
- Kindergarden (demoparty), a computer art event in Norway
- Milner's Kindergarten, a group of Britons who served in the South African Civil Service during the first decade of the 20th century
