= The Kings' Crusade =

2010 video game

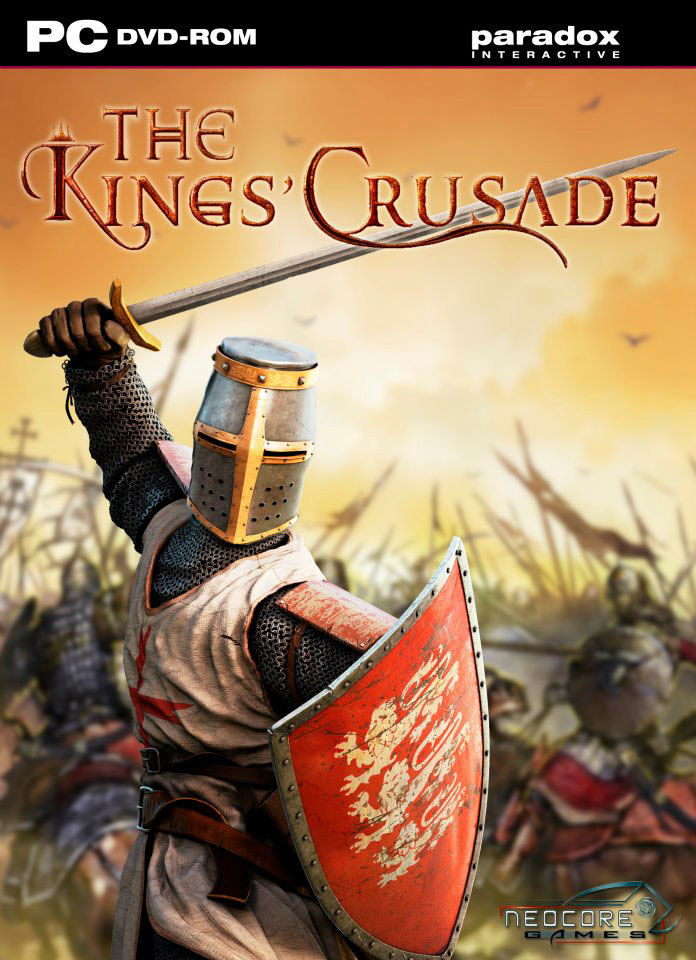
- Developer: NeocoreGames
- Publishers: Paradox Interactive; Russia; 1C Company; Snowball Studios
- Platform: Microsoft Windows
- Release: October 8, 2010
- Genres: Real-time strategy, role-playing
- Modes: Single-player, multiplayer

The Kings' Crusade (formerly Lionheart: Kings' Crusade) is a real-time strategy video game with elements of role-playing. It was developed by NeocoreGames, and was published in October 2010 by Paradox Interactive. In Russia the game was published by 1C Company and Snowball Studios called Kings' Crusade. Lionheart.

== Gameplay ==
The player has a choice to play the campaign scenario or multiplayer game.

=== Campaign ===
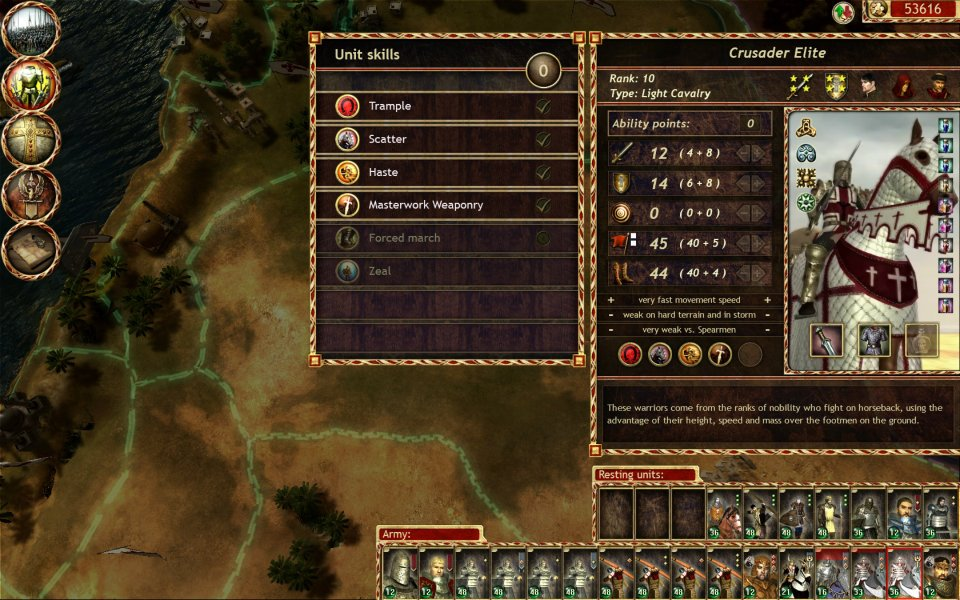

The player's aim in the campaign is to conquer the Middle East and merge it under his reign. By winning the battles, and taking certain political decisions, the player must lead Richard the Lionheart and his army to victory, over their enemies.

In this campaign the player will be doing business with representatives of several blocks. These parties often have opposing interests, their goals differ in campaigns. Before the battle, the player will have to choose an ally. Interaction with a specific unit increases the player's reputation among its members, with an increase in the level of fame new opportunities arise.

Political blocs Crusaders:

- France — constantly in conflict with England, but on the brink of war with the infidels, the French king is ready to send Lionheart his heavy cavalry.
- Knights Templar — an order of chivalry, featuring well-organized armies and wealth. They offer a useful economic improvements, and are sent to the east to fight.
- Papacy — if the player will enlist the support for the Pope, he will be able to spend less on recruitment of soldiers, their morale will increase, and the papal legate will be able to pass under his start in battle.
- Holy Roman Empire — they use the campaign's strongest infantry detachments, and after the withdrawal of its troops to help the Lionheart became useful improvements for the infantry.

The second campaign tells the story of Sultan Saladin, and begins after the crusade of Richard. Choosing the side of his troops, the player will try to regain the Holy Land under the wing of the Muslims. There are a few differences from the campaign for the Christians.

- The Saracens have a rich cultural heritage and the quest for new knowledge. They stand united and are not torn by arguments between factions like the Crusaders are. The development of science is presented as a tree technology. Improvements for the troops sold for ducats and the player gets more improvement points as he successfully performs tasks. A tree technology have three branches: the ability to provide access to the deeds of legendary heroes, the troops - to the new types of troops, and the main branch contains improvements of a general nature.
- The power of belief — unlike skills, which are not free and require the expenditure points, faith does not. During the phase control, points of faith are becoming the replenished property.

=== Multiplayer ===
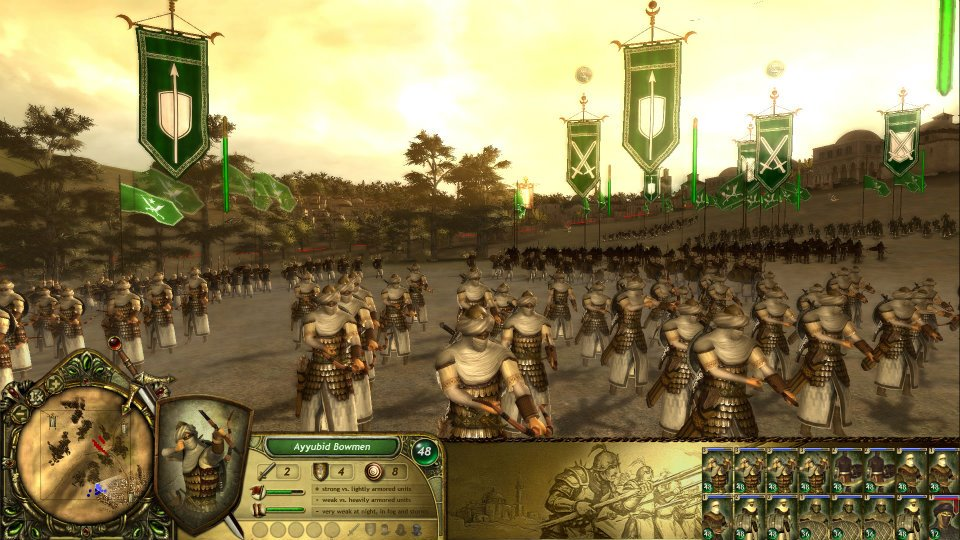

Selecting this menu item, you can fight with other players via the Internet.

There are two modes in a multiplayer game:

- Domination - provides for the equality of the enemy and symmetrical construction. Before the game starts you can adjust the amount of core resources and to choose the right battlefield.

Dominance: as already mentioned, in this regime the enemy forces are equal. You can gain the upper hand through the proper selection and application teams. It is very important to be aware of the terrain on the battlefield and take into account certain weather conditions. In other words, use the single-player experience. Your goal - to capture and retain most of the victory points.

- Protection and attack - simulates attack and distributes forces evenly. In this case, one player becomes the protector, while the other becomes the attacker, you can specify a maximum duration of the battle. Objectives: players are different, the attacker must defeat the enemy and stay within a specified time, and defender - hold on and not give himself into the enemys hands. First, before the battle, you can get more gold, but the defender can spend the points of construction to strengthen its position: to cut down trees, to build a low wall, oil traps, or Trebuchet.

In both modes of the game, you can spend gold on the troops and heroes, like hiring the troops and providing them with useful items.

Apart in the game modes are scenarios - some battles in which players have to contend with the armies under the control of artificial intelligence.

=== Battles ===
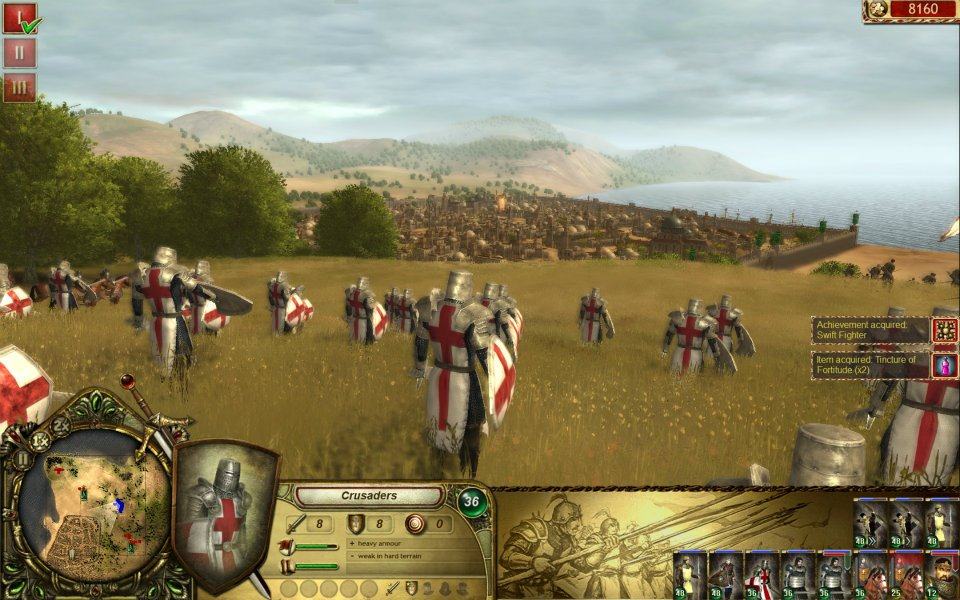

During battles in real-time it is important to influence the ability of the characters.

The battlefield also influences the outcome of battle. All combat units have access to a variety of formations, that change their effectiveness against certain kinds of enemy troops. The landscape also influences the effectiveness of certain warriors: the actions in the forestry areas prevents the cavalry, in contrast to the open space.

Morale also plays a big role, displaying during the battle at the top of the screen and showing the morale of the opposing sides.

During the campaigns and battles the player can discover battle trophies - special items to help the troops. The power and the number of available character relics depends on the number of points of faith.

=== RPG elements ===
When teams get a new level, a player can raise some of their units characteristics, such as: attack, defense, or reduce maintenance costs. When the heroes get a new level, they can get access to new abilities.

In the game there are 4 kinds of forces:

- Light Infantry
- Heavy Infantry
- Archers
- Cavalry

== Reception ==
The Kings' Crusade holds an average score of 75% at GameRankings. GameSpot gave the game 7.5, saying that the game has historical accuracy toward the crusades, but also mentioning the unimaginative multiplayer.
