= Olivia Atwater =

Fantasy author

- Occupation: Author
- Spouse: Nicholas Atwater
- Writing career
- Period: 2020–present
- Genres: Fantasy; romance; historical
- Subject: Writing
- Website: oliviaatwater.com

Olivia Atwater is an author based in Canada. She is best known for her Regency Faerie Tales trilogy, which comprises Half a Soul (2020), Ten Thousand Stitches (2020), and Longshadow (2021). She has also written the fantasy novel Small Miracles (2022), a novella with her husband, and non-fiction works about writing.

== Career ==
Atwater started writing at a young age after being inspired by a Dungeons & Dragons campaign led by her father. She submitted her first novel to a publishing company at the age of twelve, but later decided to pursue different careers and continue writing in her spare time. She worked as a web developer, historical re-enactor, repairperson, and salesperson. After researching self-publishing, Atwater followed a friend's advice and published her debut novel, Half a Soul, on her own in 2020. Inspired by British folklore, the Regency fantasy romance novel follows Theodora "Dora" Ettings, a girl who believes she was cursed after a faerie stole half of her soul. Atwater subsequently published Ten Thousand Stitches and Longshadow, which along with Half a Soul comprise the Regency Faerie Tales trilogy. The novels received positive reviews from Publishers Weekly, The British Fantasy Society, Tor.com, Booklist, and Library Journal. She wrote the novella A Matter of Execution with her husband Nicholas as a prequel to the fantasy novel Echoes of the Imperium.

Atwater sold the English rights of the Regency Faerie Tales to Orbit Books, who re-released all three novels in 2022. That same year, she published Small Miracles, an homage to Good Omens (1990) by Terry Pratchett and Neil Gaiman. Writing for The New York Times, Olivia Waite recommended the novel, likening it to Pratchett's work. Small Miracles won the eighth edition of the Self-Published Fantasy Blog-Off.

== Writing style and technique ==
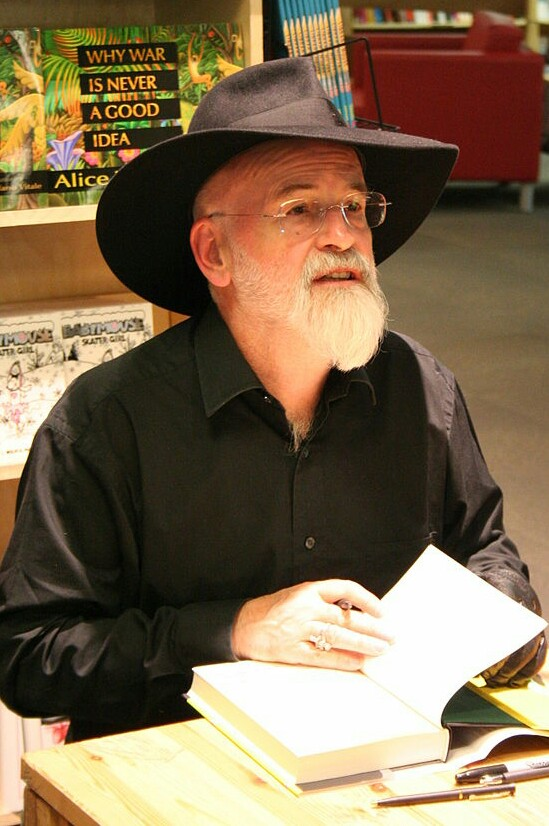
Atwater was influenced by Terry Pratchett (pictured).

Atwater usually develops her novels starting from a singular scene and sticks to the original outline of the plot. Atwater said that she used to write stories centered around "human heroism in the face of otherworldly adversity", but after meeting people less fortunate than her she began exploring themes of "human heroism in the face of human cruelty and absurdity".

Atwater likes Terry Pratchett, in particular his novels Small Gods (1992) and The Wee Free Men (2003). Reading Pratchett convinced her that her "love of fantasy wasn't lesser in any way" and inspired her to write young adult fiction. As a child, she enjoyed the works of J.R.R. Tolkien. She said her writing was influenced by Christopher Vogler's The Writer's Journey: Mythic Structure for Writers (2007), in particular her understanding of the structure of the hero's journey and the classic fairy tale.

== Personal life ==
Atwater has a degree in technical writing and editing. She lives in Montreal, Quebec with her husband Nicholas and her two cats.

== Bibliography ==
=== Regency Faerie Tales ===
- Half a Soul (2020)
- Ten Thousand Stitches (2020)
- Longshadow (2021)

Companion novellas

- The Lord Sorcier (2020)
- The Latch Key (2022)

=== Tales of the Iron Rose ===
- A Matter of Execution (2021; written with Nicholas Atwater)
- "Echos of the Imperium" (2024; written with Nicholas Atwater)

=== Atwater's Tools for Authors ===
- Better Blurb Writing for Authors (2021)
- Reader-Friendly Writing for Authors (2023)

=== Victorian Faerie Tales ===
- The Witchwood Knot (2023)

=== Other works ===
- Small Miracles (2022)
