= Josiah Bancroft =

Fantasy writer, author of "Senlin Ascends"

Josiah Bancroft (born March 29, 1978) is an American writer of fantasy, known for his initially self-published debut novel Senlin Ascends (2013).

== Works ==
Senlin Ascends and its sequels, the Books of Babel series, deal with the adventures of the schoolteacher Thomas Senlin, who is separated from his wife Marya at the foot of the immense Tower of Babel, and spends the rest of the narrative searching for her. The novel was uncommonly successful for a self-published work, due in large part to notice gained during the 2016 SPFBO competition, praise on social media from author Mark Lawrence, and a positive review by Emily May, a popular reviewer on Goodreads. As a result, it was republished, together with the sequel Arm of the Sphinx, by Orbit Books in 2018. The third book in the series, The Hod King, came out in 2019. The finale of the series, The Fall of Babel, was published in 2021. Bancroft's inspirations for the story are numerous and include Invisible Cities by Italo Calvino, Midnight's Children by Salman Rushdie, The Castle by Franz Kafka, and The Hitchhiker's Guide to the Galaxy by Douglas Adams. The Tower of Babel in the books is not intended to be the tower of biblical fame. Bancroft has explained that the setting is "more of an alternate universe than an alternate history. The Tower is not part of our timeline or this reality". Bancroft took the name Senlin from the 1920 poem "Morning Song of Senlin" by Conrad Aiken. The cover art for the three published books was created by Ian Leino, a childhood friend of Bancroft.

Senlin Ascends was well appreciated by critics. Publishers Weekly's starred review described the "brilliant debut fantasy" as "steampunk and epic, surreal and yet grounded in believable logistics". Tor.com likewise praised the imaginative setting, and called the novel "incredibly creative in its conception and no less confident in its crafting". The Washington Post included it in its five best science fiction and fantasy novels of 2018, describing it as "a classic hero's quest, elevated by creative world building and memorable characters". However, Strange Horizons wrote that "the fact that a woman's sexuality is the root cause of the conflict (...) and that the woman is immediately removed from the narrative" are indicative of the novel's problems with the portrayal of women.

The scope of Senlin's saga and the cast of characters expand in Arm of the Sphinx. Publishers Weekly's starred review claimed that the second installment "not only matches but adds to the notable achievements of the first". A review on Barnes & Noble's Sci-Fi & Fantasy Blog compared Bancroft to "a master craftsman building a workshop around himself".

In the third book, The Hod King, Senlin carries out a mission for the enigmatic Sphinx while he and his friends continue the search for Marya. The Los Angeles Times praised the book as "an easy, joyful read; the author's vibrant prose, simply incredible".

The Fall of Babel, the final book in the series, was originally scheduled for release in 2020, but Bancroft asked his publisher for an extension because, among other reasons, he "suffered some setbacks with the draft, including the deletion of a hundred pages or so."

On December 3, 2021, Orbit Books announced the acquisition of a new three book series from Josiah Bancroft entitled The Hexologists. "The Hexologists introduces us to a new world and the dynamic duo of Hexologists Iz and Warren Wilby: two private investigators who solve magical problems with magical solutions."

== Bibliography ==
The Books of Babel

1. Senlin Ascends (self-published 2013, Orbit/Hachette 2018), ISBN 9780316517911
2. Arm of the Sphinx (self-published 2014, Orbit/Hachette 2018), ISBN 9780316517959
3. The Hod King (Orbit/Hachette UK 2019), ISBN 9780356510859
4. The Fall of Babel (Orbit/Hachette 2021), ISBN 9780316518192

The Hexologists Novels

1. The Hexologists (Orbit/Hachette 2023), ISBN 9780356519067
2. A Tangle of Time (Orbit/Hachette 2025), ISBN 9780316443500
