= The Incredible Adventures of Van Helsing =

2013 video game

- Developer: NeocoreGames
- Publisher: NeocoreGames
- Platforms: Microsoft Windows, OS X, Xbox One, PlayStation 4
- Release: Microsoft Windows, OS X; 22 May 2013; Xbox One; 1 December 2015; Playstation 4; 1 March 2017
- Genre: Action role-playing
- Modes: Single-player, multiplayer

The Incredible Adventures of Van Helsing is an action role-playing video game developed and published by NeocoreGames. It was released on 22 May 2013. Based on the novel Dracula by Bram Stoker, the game focuses on the trials of young Van Helsing, son of the legendary vampire hunter Abraham Van Helsing from the book. The game is set in a gothic-noir 19th-century Eastern Europe and contains "intentionally anachronistic humor and gadgetry". A sequel, The Incredible Adventures of Van Helsing II, was released on 22 May 2014. A second sequel, The Incredible Adventures of Van Helsing III, was released on 22 May 2015.

== Plot ==
The game is based on Bram Stoker's tale of Count Dracula, similar to how the developer's earlier role-playing game King Arthur was based on the tale of King Arthur. The game is not set strictly in the same fictional universe as Bram Stoker's novel Dracula, but rather a similar one in a twisted 19th century Europe with "monsters, magic and weird technology". The game takes place in Borgova, the gothic-noir capital of the fictional kingdom of Borgovia. The city is vast, bolstered by anachronistic science, but also filled with evil creatures that this science has created. The game's protagonist is the son of Abraham Van Helsing, the vampire hunter from the novel, and it is his job to continue in his father's footsteps and exterminate the monsters from the city.

== Development and release ==
Three versions of the main character

On 9 May 2012, the Hungarian independent development studio NeocoreGames announced an entry of their new project, The Incredible Adventures of Van Helsing. The title was developed for the PC and the Xbox 360's Xbox Live Arcade platform. The developers also announced at Gamescom 2012 that the game is planned to be part of a trilogy.

In October 2012, after receiving feedback from the gamer community that the depiction of the young Van Helsing appeared "too young and inexperienced", NeocoreGames held a vote to decide which of three possible versions of the main character would be used in the game: The Mysterious Stranger, The Chevalier, or The Veteran. Receiving 72% of the vote, The Mysterious Stranger depiction was chosen to be used for the young Van Helsing.

A remastered version including the sequels was released as one big game on 6 November 2015, titled The Incredible Adventures of Van Helsing: Final Cut. On 1 December 2015, the game was released as part of the Games with Gold benefit, for the Xbox One.

== Reception ==
The Incredible Adventures of Van Helsing received "mixed or average" reviews, according to review aggregator platform Metacritic.

Patrick Hancock of Destructoid gave the game a 5.5 out of 10, writing, "A forgetful story, performance issues, and an unexplained tower defense element hold Van Helsing back from living up to its true potential, and what’s left meanders the line between standard and boring." Christian Donlan of Eurogamer found the genre to be a good fit for the franchise and wrote, "Van Helsing isn't a polished game, or even a particularly thoughtful one for most of its campaign, but it has scrappy charm and schlocky character, and it benefits from leaning on one of those design templates that is ultimately really, really difficult to screw up too badly." GameSpot liked the clever writing, atmospheric setting, and combat mechanics, while deeming the clumsy interface and sparse number of multiplayer matches as minor hindrances. Nathan Grayson of IGN noted that while Van Helsing was lacking in innovation, depth, and substantial multiplayer, it was a "solid game." Polygon's Philip Kollar said that while the game's setting and folklore-heavy background had potential, the repetitive content and lack of innovation hindered its quality. John Cal McCormick of Push Square disliked the uninteresting battle system and narrative and praised the lighthearted tone for helping the game stand out from other titles in the same genre. RPGamer found the writing, characters, exploration, and combat to be enjoyable and disliked the reused content and subpar difficulty modes.

=== The Incredible Adventures of Van Helsing II ===
The Incredible Adventures of Van Helsing II received "generally favorable" reviews, according to review aggregator Metacritic.

Patrick Hancock of Destructoid gave the sequel an 8 out of 10, calling it "...a much better showing than the original", while noting that it improved and innovated on every concept the original game introduced. Daniel Starkey of GameSpot praised the title's worldbuilding, dense environments, and rewarding combat while criticizing the slow intro and cluttered narrative. IGN's Leif Johnson called Van Helsing II "...a considerable improvement over its predecessor" and noted that though balance issues and multiplayer bugs remained, the game's variety in tower defense scenarios and classes made up for it. Push Square's John Cal McCormick wrote that while the game improved in many ways over its predecessor, it failed in many others, as seen in its uninteresting combat and story.

=== The Incredible Adventures of Van Helsing III ===
The Incredible Adventures of Van Helsing III received "mixed or average" reviews, according to review aggregator Metacritic.

Destructoid's Patrick Hancock called the title a "copy-paste job" and wrote that Van Helsing III did not innovate upon the second game's mechanics. Jeb Haught of GameRevolution commended the game's level design, class variety, and customization options while taking issue with the reduced level cap, neutered steampunk aesthetic, and overly streamlined gameplay segments. Daniel Starkey of GameSpot praised the character interactions, action, and pacing, and stated that the recycled assets, lack of content, and technical stability was disappointing.
