= Michael R. Fletcher =

Canadian fantasy author

- Born: 1971 (age 54–55)
- Occupation: Author
- Writing career
- Genre: Grimdark fantasy
- Website: michaelrfletcher.com

Michael R. Fletcher (born 1971) is a speculative fiction author from Toronto, Canada. Fletcher is known for his grimdark fantasy novels including the Manifest Delusions series.

== Career ==
Born in 1971, Fletcher is based in Toronto, Canada, and has worked as an audio engineer. His first novel, published in 2013, was the science fiction work 88. In 2015 he published the first novel in the Manifest Delusions grimdark fantasy trilogy, Beyond Redemption, which Publishers Weekly called "disturbing and original fantasy". The concluding novel A War to End All, authored with Clayton Snyder, was published in 2023.

Fletcher published the novel Swarm and Steel in 2017. A standalone novel set in the Manifest Delusions universe, it received positive critical reception. Kirkus Reviews particularly highlighted the "plot full of twisted reveals" and critic Tiffany Austin, writing a review for Booklist, concluded by stating "Fletcher's latest grim-dark novel will leave readers wanting the story to continue".

Fletchers work has been named on a number of best of year lists, including Polygon's best sci-fi and fantasy books of 2024, and Grimdark Magazines' best dark and grimdark SFF of 2022.

== Awards ==
In 2020 Fletchers novel Black Stone Heart, part of the Obsidian Path series, came second in the Self-Published Fantasy Blog-Off competition organised by Mark Lawrence. In 2025 the book he wrote with Anna Smith Spark, In the Shadow of Their Dying, was shortlisted for the World Fantasy Award—Novella.

== Bibliography ==
=== Manifest Delusions trilogy ===
- Fletcher, Michael (2015). Beyond Redemption. Harper Voyager. ISBN 9780062387035.
- Fletcher, Michael (2016). The Mirror's Truth. ISBN 9780995312227.
- Fletcher, Michael; Snyder, Clayton (2023). A War to End All. ISBN 9798394370854.

=== The Obsidian Path ===
- Fletcher, Michael (2020). Black Stone Heart. ISBN 9781658249737.
- Fletcher, Michael (2021). She Dreams in Blood. ISBN 9798731878807.
- Fletcher, Michael (2022). An End to Sorrow. ISBN 9798812414351.

=== Other novels ===
- Fletcher, Michael (2013). 88. Five Rivers Chapmanry. ISBN 9781927400234.
- Fletcher, Michael (2017). Swarm and Steel. Talos Press. ISBN 9781940456898.
- Fletcher, Michael; Smith Spark, Anna (2024). In the Shadow of Their Dying. Grimdark Magazine. ISBN 9780648663539.
- Fletcher, Michael (2024). The Storm Beneath the World. ISBN 9798864549797.

=== Short stories ===
- "Artificial Stupidity" (2011)
- "Intellectual Property" (2011)
