= Self-Published Fantasy Blog-Off =

Literary contest

The Self-Published Fantasy Blog-Off (SPFBO) is an annual literary contest intended to bring greater visibility to self-published English-language fantasy authors.

The SPFBO has been operated since 2015 by the author Mark Lawrence. He distributes about 300 novels submitted by the authors to ten fantasy bloggers to review. Each blogger selects a finalist, which is then reviewed by all ten bloggers. The winner is the finalist with the highest average review score.

The contest has been credited with making high-quality self-published novels discoverable, and with boosting the careers of the winners. Though not the primary purpose, it has helped several authors find publishing contracts. These include Jonathan French, the 2016 winner, and Josiah Bancroft, whose book Senlin Ascends, despite losing out before the final stage of the same competition, was reviewed so positively that it gained widespread attention in the fantasy community.

In 2023, the winner of the annual "cover contest" associated with the Self-Published Fantasy Blog-Off withdrew the winning cover after accusations that the entry was generated by AI. The entry was later also disqualified by Lawrence, who said there was "compelling evidence that the cover was at least partly AI generated, breaking the rules of the contest". The cover contest has been discontinued.

== Winners ==
Year	Winner	Title	Score out of 10	Notes
2015	Mike McClung	The Thief Who Pulled On Trouble's Braids	8.00	
2016	Jonathan French	The Grey Bastards	8.65	Commercially published by Crown in 2018, ISBN 9780525572442
2017	Rob J. Hayes	Where Loyalties Lie	8.10	
2018	J. Zachary Pike	Orconomics	8.65	
2019	M.L. Wang	The Sword of Kaigen	8.65	Commercially published as an Indigo exclusive in 2024, ISBN 9781552674949
2020	Justin Lee Anderson	The Lost War	8.35	Commercially published by Orbit in 2023, ISBN 9780356519531
2021	J. D. Evans	Reign & Ruin	7.70	
2022	Olivia Atwater	Small Miracles	8.65	
2023	Morgan Stang	Murder at Spindle Manor	7.85	
2024	J. L. Odom	By Blood, By Salt	7.70	

== Finalists ==
=== SPFBO 1 (2015) ===
#	Title	Author	Score out of 10
1	The Thief Who Pulled on Trouble's Braids	Michael McClung	8.00
2	Bloodrush	Ben Galley	7.75
3	The Weight of a Crown	Tavish Kaeden	7.30
4	City of Burning Shadows	Barbara J. Webb	7.15
4	Sins of a Sovereignty	Plague Jack (Simon Watts)	7.15
6	What Remains of Heroes	David Benem	7.00
7	Shattered Sands	W.G. Saraband	6.70
8	Under a Colder Sun	Greg James	6.60
9	Priest	Matthew Colville	6.30
10	A Soul for Trouble	Crista McHugh	6.25

=== SPFBO 2 (2016) ===
#	Title	Author	Score out of 10
1	The Grey Bastards	Jonathan French	8.65
2	Path of Flames	Phil Tucker	7.70
3	Paternus	Dyrk Ashton	7.30
4	Fionn: Defence of Rath Bladhma	Brian O'Sullivan	7.20
5	Larcout	K.A. Krantz	6.70
6	Assassin's Charge	Claire Frank	6.35
7	The Music Box Girl	K.A. Stewart	6.30
8	The Moonlight War	S.K.S. Perry	5.95
8	Outpost	F.T. McKinstry	5.95
10	The Shadow Soul	Kaitlyn Davis	5.10

=== SPFBO 3 (2017) ===
#	Title	Author	Score out of 10
1	Where Loyalties Lie	Rob J. Hayes	8.10
2	Sufficiently Advanced Magic	Andrew Rowe	7.60
2	The Crimson Queen	Alec Hutson	7.60
4	Devil's Night Dawning	Damien Black	6.70
5	Jack Bloodfist: Fixer	James Jakins	6.55
6	The Way Into Chaos	Harry Connolly	6.45
7	The War of Undoing	Alex Perry	6.30
8	Chaos Trims My Beard	Brett Herman	6.00
9	Tiger Lily	K. Bird Lincoln	5.45
10	Pilgrimage to Skara	Jonathan S. Pembroke	4.35

=== SPFBO 4 (2018) ===
#	Title	Author	Score out of 10
1	Orconomics	J. Zachary Pike	8.65
2	Gods of Men	Barbara Kloss	8.05
2	We Ride the Storm	Devin Madson	8.05
4	Sworn to the Night	Craig Shaefer	8.00
5	Symphony of the Wind	Steven McKinnon	7.40
6	Aching God	Mike Shel	6.90
7	Ruthless Magic	Megan Crewe	6.35
8	Out of Nowhere	Patrick LeClerc	5.50
9	The Anointed	Keith Ward	5.10
10	Sowing	Angie Grigaliunas	4.55

=== SPFBO 5 (2019) ===
#	Title	Author	Score out of 10
1	The Sword of Kaigen	M. L. Wang	8.65
2	Fortune's Fool	Angela Boord	8.35
3	Blood of Heirs	Alicia Wanstall-Burke	8.20
4	A Tale of Stars and Shadow	Lisa Cassidy	7.75
5	Kalanon's Rising	Darian Smith	7.70
5	Never Die	Rob J. Hayes	7.70
7	Beggar's Rebellion	Levi Jacobs	7.25
8	Blade's Edge	Virginia McClain	6.90
9	A Sea of Broken Glass	Sonya M. Black	5.85
10	Spark City	Robert J Power	4.80

=== SPFBO 6 (2020) ===
#	Title	Author	Score out of 10
1	The Lost War	Justin Lee Anderson	8.35
2	Black Stone Heart	Michael R. Fletcher	8.05
3	Shadow of a Dead God	Patrick Samphire	7.80
4	Voice of War	Zack Argyle	7.15
5	Last Memoria	Rachel Emma Shaw	7.10
6	Wind From The Wilderness	Suzannah Rowntree	6.95
7	Darkness Forged	Matt Larkin	6.60
8	The Combat Codes	Alexander Darwin	6.35
9	The Fall of Erlon	Robert H Fleming	6.10
10	Nether Light	Shaun Paul Stevens	6.05

=== SPFBO 7 (2021) ===
#	Title	Author	Score out of 10
1	Reign & Ruin	J. D. Evans	7.70
2	Legacy of the Brightwash	Krystle Matar	7.60
3	Shadows of Ivory	Bryce O'Connor and TL Greylock	7.30
4	Norylska Groans	Michael R. Fletcher and Clayton W. Snyder	7.10
5	Burn Red Skies	Kerstin Espinosa Rosero	7.05
6	The Mortal Blade	Christopher Mitchell	6.90
7	The Forever King	Ben Galley	6.85
7	The Iron Crown	L.L. MacRae	6.85
9	We Men of Ash and Shadows	HL Tinsley	6.75
10	Hall of Bones	Tim Hardie	6.45

=== SPFBO 8 (2022) ===
#	Title	Author	Score out of 10
1	Small Miracles	Olivia Atwater	8.65
2	The Thirteenth Hour	Trudie Skies	8.35
2	A Song For The Void	Andrew C. Piazza	8.35
4	Miss Percy's Pocket Guide (to the Care and Feeding of British Dragons)	Quenby Olson	8.20
5	The Umbral Storm	Alec Hutson	8.05
6	Scales and Sensibility	Stephanie Burgis	7.40
7	A Touch of Light	Thiago Abdalla	6.95
8	Tethered Spirits	T. A. Hernandez	6.60
9	Mysterious Ways	Abbie Evans	6.25
10	Fire of the Forebears	L.A. Buck	6.00

=== SPFBO 9 (2023) ===
#	Title	Author	Score out of 10
1	Murder at Spindle Manor	Morgan Stang	7.85
2	Hills of Heather and Bone	K.E. Andrews	7.80
3	The Fall is All There Is	C.M. Caplan	7.55
3	The Last Ranger	J.D.L. Rosell	7.55
5	Cold West	Clayton Snyder	7.35
6	A Rival Most Vial	R.K. Ashwick	7.20
6	The Wickwire Watch	Jacquelyn Hagen	7.20
8	Daughter of the Beast	E C Greaves	6.80
9	The Last Fang of God	Ryan Kirk	6.70
10	Master of the Void	Wend Raven	6.50

=== SPFBO X (2024) ===
#	Title	Author	Score out of 10
1	By Blood, By Salt	J. L. Odom	7.70*
2	Mushroom Blues	Adrian M. Gibson	7.70
3	Runelight	JA Andrews	7.45
4	The Forest at the Heart of Her Mage	Hiyodori	7.30
5	The Oathsworn Legacy	K. R. Gangi	7.25
6	By A Silver Thread	Rachel Aaron	7.20
7	The Humane Society for Creatures and Cryptids	Stephanie Gillis	7.10
8	Gates of Hope	J E Hanford	6.95
9	The Tenacious Tale of Tanna the Tendersword	Dewey Conway & Bill Adams	6.60
10	Wolf of Withervale	Joaquín Baldwin	6.10

*Tiebreaker: The most blogs with the book as their top finalist score
