= King Arthur: The Role-Playing Wargame =

2009 role-playing video game

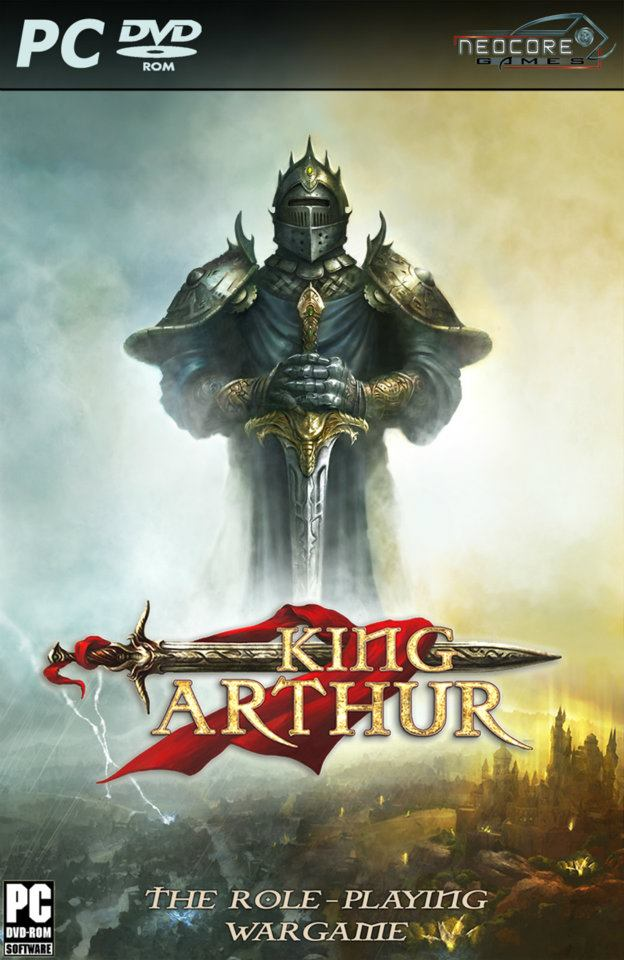
- Developer: NeocoreGames
- Publishers: Paradox Interactive; Ubisoft (EU); E-Frontier (JP)
- Series: King Arthur
- Engine: Coretech with PhysX
- Platform: Microsoft Windows
- Release: November 24, 2009: NA: November 24, 2009; EU: June 11, 2010; JP: July 2, 2010 Knights and Vassals & Legendary Artifacts; WW: January 19, 2010 The Saxons; WW: July 8, 2010 The Druids; WW: January 18, 2011 Fallen Champions; WW: September 16, 2011
- Genres: Real-time tactics, turn-based strategy, role-playing, Grand strategy, First-person shooter
- Modes: Single-player, multiplayer

King Arthur: The Role-Playing Wargame is a real-time tactics and role-playing video game developed by NeocoreGames and published by Paradox Interactive in North America, Ubisoft in Europe, and E-Frontier in Japan. It seeks to blend elements of the real-time tactics, role-playing, and grand strategy genres into one. A sequel titled King Arthur II: The Role-Playing Wargame (not to be confused with the original's Japanese title, which was released in July 2010) was released online in Europe on September 20, 2011, and then worldwide in 2012.

== Gameplay ==
Game play in King Arthur is a mix of real-time strategy, role-playing, and grand strategy elements. The grand strategy portion of the game is played on a large campaign map of Britannia. When a battle is fought, the action changes to a real-time strategy mode. The position of the battle on the large-scale map has minimal effect on the environment of the battlefield (i.e. there are a set number of maps that the player can choose to fight the battle on).

=== Warfare ===
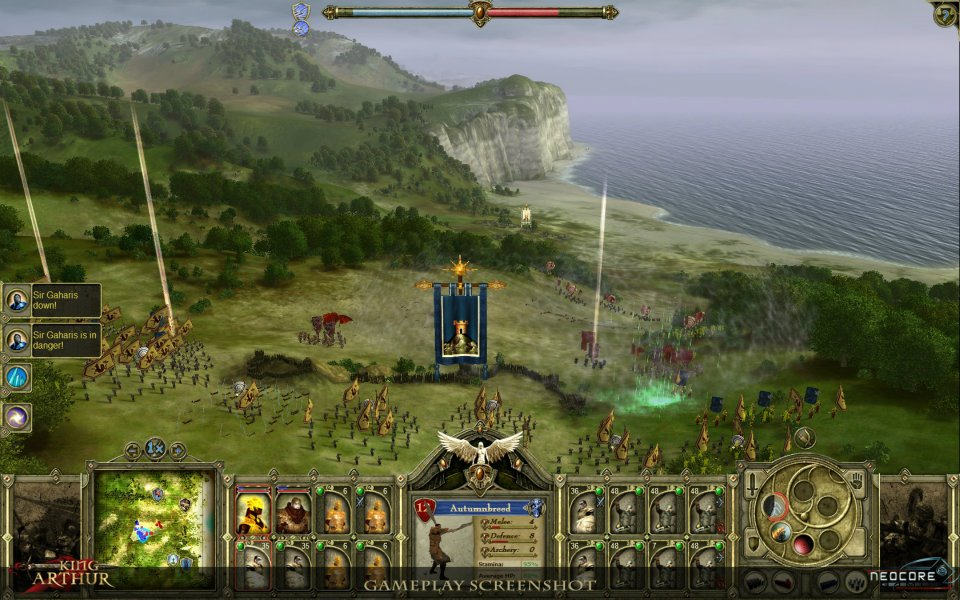
Gameplay screenshot

During the real-time battles, the RPG-style abilities of the heroes come into play. Heroes wield magical and non-magical abilities, such as the power to call down lightning, or the ability to change the conditions of the battlefield. Heroes are devastating in melee combat, able to take on dozens of troops. Heroes also inspire nearby troops and keep up the morale of the army as a whole. If the leader of the army is captured, however, the blow to army morale can be devastating.

The battlefield itself also influences gameplay and the outcome of the battle. Most battles begin in sunlight. Units have access to various formations, which increase or decrease their effectiveness against certain types of enemies. The terrain affects the effectiveness of certain units; woodland, for example, hampers cavalry while open fields helps their momentum.

Morale plays a large role in the real-time mode; a varying number of victory locations, similar to "control points" in many first-person shooters, are located on each map. If one side holds more victory locations than the other the morale of the side holding fewer victory locations will decrease steadily. The rate of morale decrease is proportional the difference in number of victory locations controlled. In addition, taking control of a victory locations confers an immediate magical power to the owner. Victory locations tend to be strategically located, such as on hills or nearby buildings (which provide cover); capturing and retaining these points is crucial to victory - the complete loss of morale results in defeat.

Units gain experience during combat, and can be leveled up the following winter season.

=== Role-playing ===
When units level up, the player can boost several attributes, for example, attack, defense, or decreasing upkeep costs. When heroes level up, they may gain access to new spells and effects, as well as an increase in their martial skills. Heroes, called "Knights of the Round-table", have 20 levels maximum. Both active and passive abilities can be acquired. For example, many passive abilities increase crop and taxes production in the province that the hero is currently in. An active ability is one triggered during combat, such as lightning.

=== Campaign ===
The campaign map displays an overview of Roman Britain in a fantasy-oriented style. Laws, research, and production all play a role in building the player's kingdom. Economy is streamlined and fairly automatic; there are only two resources: food and gold, both collected from the player's provinces. Certain hero abilities can increase the output of a province. This large-scale strategy mode also integrates the four seasons into the campaign. Each turn represents a season. During winter, all army movement ceases and taxes roll in to the coffers. Units also level up during the winter months. Quests or events, such as rebellions or volunteers for the player's armies, appear on the map. Similar to the campaign map layout in Empire: Total War, each province has several towns, castles, or other places of conquer. To control the province completely, the player must conquer every one of these. Every one of the player's major actions has an effect upon the morality of the player's faction, measured in two ways: by religion and type of ruler. There are only two forms of religion in King Arthur, Christianity, and the "Old Faith". There are several advantages and disadvantages to both, and both unlock advanced and powerful units. The player can also either be a "tyrant", or "rightful king", which in concert with the player's choice of religion allows the player to unlock specific units.

The game is driven forward largely through quests that appear on the campaign map. Only knights can undertake quests. Once a knight has chosen to undertake a quest, a game resembling text adventure begins. The player has a series of options and, depending on the attributes of his knight, can intimidate or talk his way through.

== Plot ==
The plot in King Arthur draws mainly on Arthurian legend, adding and intermixing foreign elements into it. The player takes the role of King Arthur himself, and commands his knights and armies to expand his kingdom. It is explained that Uther Pendragon, Arthur's father, failed to draw the sword Excalibur from the stone. Arthur, years later, pulls the sword from the stone, unleashing ancient forces upon Britannia.

== History ==
Bug fixing patches versioned 1.02, 1.03 and 1.04 were released after publication.

== Development ==
=== Concept and design ===
Development of King Arthur: The Role-Playing Wargame began in 2005 following the founding of the Budapest-based Hungarian studio NeocoreGames. Conceived as the studio's flagship project, the game was designed to combine turn-based grand strategy, real-time tactical combat, and narrative role-playing mechanics. To test its custom technology and campaign structure prior to completing King Arthur, the team developed and released a smaller-scale strategy game, Crusaders: Thy Kingdom Come, in 2008.

Lead writer Viktor Juhász and the narrative team adapted traditional Arthurian legends while incorporating elements of Celtic and Anglo-Saxon mythology. The design team implemented a two-axis morality system—measuring player choices between Christianity and the Old Faith on one axis, and Rightful or Tyrant rule on the other—which influenced narrative progression, available unit types, and hero abilities. Non-combat encounters and text-based quests were structured after interactive gamebooks.

=== Technical development ===
The game was built on NeocoreGames' proprietary 3D game engine, Coretech, integrated with Nvidia PhysX for physics processing. The engine was built to render real-time battles featuring thousands of unit models simultaneously on dynamic 3D terrain, incorporating line-of-sight mechanics and dynamic atmospheric weather effects. The game's original soundtrack was composed by Gergely Buttinger.

=== Release and post-launch ===
NeocoreGames formally announced the game in November 2008. It was released for Microsoft Windows on November 24, 2009, published by Paradox Interactive in North America, Ubisoft in Europe, and E-Frontier in Japan. The title was among the early third-party games to utilize Valve's Steamworks integration for digital distribution.

Following release, NeocoreGames supported the title with several patches to address gameplay balance. Patch 1.02 added a lower difficulty setting and reduced the power of ranged archer units, which early reviewers had identified as unbalanced. Between 2010 and 2011, NeocoreGames released four downloadable content (DLC) packs—Knights and Vassals, Legendary Artifacts, The Saxons, and The Druids—followed by a standalone expansion, King Arthur: Fallen Champions.

== Downloadable content ==
Neocore released two downloadable content items: Knights and Vassals (adding further units and heroes), and Legendary Artifacts (adding additional weapons, relics and other items) on January 19, 2010.

Expansions were released: in July 2010 King Arthur: The Saxons added an additional campaign set after the Arthurian period, during the Saxon era of Britain; the expansion had a sandbox game style. Another expansion, released January 2011 - King Arthur: The Druids, set in Wales, also used a 'sandbox' type game format.

== King Arthur: Fallen Champions ==
King Arthur: Fallen Champions is a stand-alone expansion, released September 2011, with a story-based mission structure. The game was intended to act as a bridge between the stories of the original game and the sequel King Arthur II: The Role-Playing Wargame.

== Reception ==
=== King Arthur: The Role-Playing Wargame ===
King Arthur: The Role-Playing Wargame

Aggregate score
Aggregator	Score
Metacritic	79/100

Review scores
Publication	Score
Eurogamer	7/10
GameSpot	7/10
GameZone	7.5/10
PC Gamer (US)	86%
PC PowerPlay	7/10
PC Zone	79%

The game received "generally favorable reviews" according to the review aggregation website Metacritic. GameSpot's review praised the game's captivating environment and style, innovations like the victory locations, and detailed graphics. However, criticism was made of a confusing decision making mechanism for strategic play, overpowered archer units, and some difficulty humps in the campaign. A 1.02 patch introduced a 'beginner' difficulty level, and options to reduce archer's effectiveness.

=== DLCs and Fallen Champions ===
King Arthur: The Saxons

Aggregate score
Aggregator	Score
Metacritic	78/100

Review score
Publication	Score
PC Gamer (UK)	81%

King Arthur: Fallen Champions

Aggregate score
Aggregator	Score
Metacritic	54/100

Review scores
Publication	Score
Destructoid	4/10
GamePro	2/5
GameSpot	7.5/10
The Digital Fix	8/10

King Arthur: The Saxons received "generally favorable reviews", while King Arthur: The Druids and the Fallen Champions expansion pack received "mixed" reviews according to Metacritic.

== Sequel ==
A sequel to the game, titled King Arthur II: The Role-Playing Wargame, was released online in Europe on September 20, 2011, and then worldwide in 2012.
