= Grimdark =

Subgenre of speculative fiction

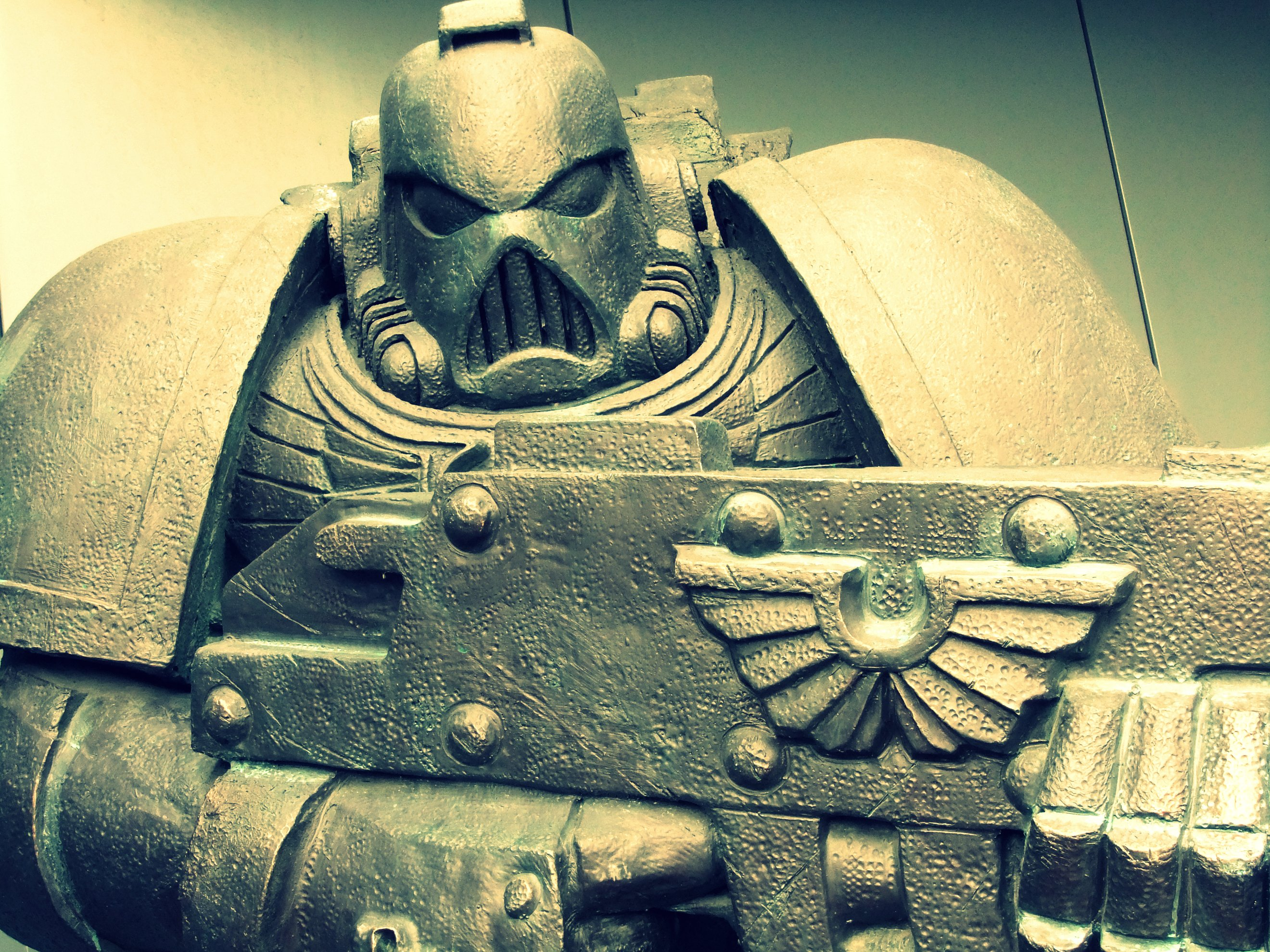
The term "grimdark" was inspired by Warhammer 40,000.

Grimdark is a subgenre of speculative fiction with a tone, style, or setting that is particularly dystopian, amoral, and violent. The term is inspired by the tagline of the tabletop strategy game Warhammer 40,000: "In the grim darkness of the far future, there is only war."

== Definitions ==
Several attempts to define the neologism grimdark have been made:

- Adam Roberts described it as fiction "where nobody is honourable and Might is Right", and as "the standard way of referring to fantasies that turn their backs on the more uplifting, Pre-Raphaelite visions of idealized medievaliana, and instead stress how nasty, brutish, short and, er, dark life back then 'really' was", while noting that grimdark has little to do with re-imagining an actual historic reality and more with conveying the sense that our own world is a "cynical, disillusioned, ultraviolent place".
- Genevieve Valentine called grimdark a "shorthand for a subgenre of fantasy fiction that claims to trade on the psychology of those sword-toting heroes, and the dark realism behind all those kingdom politics".
- In the view of Jared Shurin, grimdark fantasy has three key components: a grim and dark tone, a sense of realism (for example, monarchs are useless and heroes are flawed), and the agency of the protagonists: whereas in high fantasy everything is predestined and the tension revolves around how the heroes defeat the Dark Lord, grimdark is "fantasy protestantism": characters have to choose between good and evil, and are "just as lost as we are".
- Liz Bourke considered grimdark's defining characteristic to be "a retreat into the valorisation of darkness for darkness's sake, into a kind of nihilism that portrays right action ... as either impossible or futile". This, according to her, has the effect of absolving the protagonists as well as the reader from moral responsibility.
- Helen Young equates grimdark to gritty fantasy, as exemplified by George R. R. Martin's A Song of Ice and Fire series.

Whether grimdark is a genre in its own right or an unhelpful label has also been discussed. Valentine noted that while some writers have embraced the term, others see it as "a dismissive term for fantasy that's dismantling tropes, a stamp unfairly applied".

== Use in fantasy fiction ==
According to Adam Roberts, grimdark is an "anti-Tolkien" approach to fantasy writing. George R. R. Martin's popular grimdark fantasy series A Song of Ice and Fire is characterized, in Roberts' view, by its reaction to Tolkien's idealism, even though it owes much to Tolkien. According to Jon Garrad, grimdark is associated with the gothic movement of the 1990s and its negativity and emphasis on loss.

Writing in The Guardian in 2016, Damien Walter summarized what he considered grimdark's "domination" of the fantasy genre as "bigger swords, more fighting, bloodier blood, more fighting, axes, more fighting", and a "commercial imperative to win adolescent, male readers". He saw this trend as being in opposition to "a truly epic and more emotionally nuanced kind of fantasy" that delivered storytelling.

Grimdark fantasy has been written since the 1980s by authors including Michael Moorcock, Glen Cook, George R. R. Martin, Joe Abercrombie, Richard K. Morgan, Paul Kearney, Mark Lawrence, Michael R. Fletcher, and Anna Smith Spark. In a broader sense, the "pervasively gritty, bleak, pessimistic, or nihilistic view of the world" characteristic of grimdark fiction is found in much popular fiction from the 2000s, including Batman comics, the television series Breaking Bad, and the media franchise The Walking Dead.

== Contrasting genres and trends ==
In 2017, the writer Alexandra Rowland proposed that the "opposite of grimdark" is "hopepunk", a trend that emphasizes what grimdark rejects: the importance of hope and the sense that ideals are worth fighting for despite adversity. The novelist Derek B. Miller defined hopepunk as "stories that free the soul from darkness. That necessitates situating the characters and action in a dark world and then directing the drama and activity towards the light. Whether they reach it or not is part of the story."

Another style proposed to provide a contrast to grimdark is "noblebright", which takes as its premise that not only are there good fights worth fighting, but that they are also winnable and result in a happy ending.

In 2022, the speculative fiction writer Charlie Jane Anders proposed the term "sweetweird", in contrast to grimdark, to describe a trend in storytelling of 2010s and 2020s exemplified by popular shows like Steven Universe or Star Trek: Lower Decks, the movie Everything, Everywhere, All at Once, and books like Light from Uncommon Stars or The Invisible Life of Addie LaRue. She describes sweetweird as: "stories that feature lovable characters and a focus on supportive chosen family, set against worlds that are, shall we say, somewhat tarnished and bizarre." and "Wherever surrealism and kindness join in a beautifully unholy union, there you will find sweetweird."

== See also ==
- Dark fantasy
