= Anna Smith Spark =

British fantasy author

- Born: 1978 or 1979 (age 47–48)
- Education: The Hertfordshire and Essex High School
- Alma mater: University College London; University of Essex; Birkbeck, University of London
- Occupation: Author
- Children: 2
- Writing career
- Genre: Grimdark fantasy
- Website: www.courtofbrokenknives.net

Anna Smith Spark (born 1978 or 1979) is a British fantasy fiction writer. She wrote a trilogy titled Empires of Dust as well as several other standalone works, and has been styled the "Queen of Grimdark".

== Early life ==
Smith Spark is from Bishop's Stortford, where she was educated at The Hertfordshire and Essex High School. Academically she has a BA from University College London (UCL), an MA from the University of Essex, and a PhD from Birkbeck, University of London, focused on classical and cultural history.

== Career ==
The Court of Broken Knives, Smith Spark's first novel and the first in the Empires of Dust trilogy, was released in 2017. Focused on four protagonists, the story is a grimdark fantasy about an attempt to overthrow the Sekemleth Empire. It was released to positive critical reception, with Kirkus magazine stating that it should "appeal to grimdark fans looking for the extreme edge", but that "others may well find it nasty, brutish, and not short enough". The sequel, The Tower of Living and Dying, was released in 2018. The previous protagonist, Marith Altrersyr, becomes king and leaves behind a "trail of violent death". A review in Publishers Weekly states that Smith Spark "fascinates and entertains", with no sign of "middle-book sag". The concluding novel in the "blood-spattered" trilogy, The House of Sacrifice, was released in 2019.

In 2023, Smith Spark published A Woman of the Sword. Set in the same world as the Empires of Dust, the novel is character-led, focusing more on "grunt" characters, including from a feminist perspective and addressing PTSD and the trials of motherhood. A review in Grimdark magazine stated that the book "hurts to read", but is "unputdownable at times". Also released in 2023 was the novel A Sword of Bronze and Ashes, about a retired warrior, Kanda, who is now a wife and mother living peacefully until ancient foes return and threaten the agrarian existence of herself and her family. It was described by Liz Rourke of Locus Magazine as a "peculiar, ambitious novel" that recalls "oral epic poetry" and is reminiscent of the Táins.

== Personal life ==
Smith Spark and her husband Jamie have two children.

== Awards ==
In 2018 Smith Spark's novel The Court of Broken Knives was nominated for both a David Gemmell award and a British Fantasy Award. In 2025 the book she wrote with Michael R. Fletcher, In the Shadow of Their Dying, was shortlisted for the World Fantasy Award—Novella.

== Bibliography ==
=== Empires of Dust ===
- Smith Spark, Anna (2017). The Court of Broken Knives. HarperCollins. ISBN 9780008204174.
- Smith Spark, Anna (2018). The Tower of Living and Dying. HarperCollins. ISBN 9780008204105.
- Smith Spark, Anna (2019). The House of Sacrifice. HarperCollins. ISBN 9780008204143.

=== Sword duology ===
- Smith Spark, Anna (2023). A Sword of Bronze and Ashes. Flame Tree. ISBN 9781787588400.
- Smith Spark, Anna (2025). A Sword of Blood and Ruin. Flame Tree. ISBN 9781787589698.

=== Other novel and novellass ===
- Smith Spark, Anna (2023). A Woman of the Sword. Luna Press. ISBN 9781915556042.
- Fletcher, Michael; Smith Spark, Anna (2024). In the Shadow of Their Dying. Grimdark Magazine. ISBN 9780648663539.

=== Tie-in novels ===
- Smith Spark, Anna (2025). Anderson Versus Death. Rebellion. ISBN 9781837865918. (featuring Judge Anderson and Judge Death)

=== Short stories ===
- Smith Spark, Anna (2016). "A Knight Was Once Sent on a Quest by Her Master". In Speakman, Shawn (ed.). Unbound II: New Tales by Masters of Fantasy. Grim Oak Press. ISBN 9781944145088.
- Smith Spark, Anna (2017). "Red Glass". Grimdark Magazine. No. 12. ISBN 9780648010586.
- Smith Spark, Anna (2018). "The Fall of Tereen". In Triantafyllou, Petros (ed.). Art of War: Anthology for Charity. Booknest.eu. ISBN 9781983961304.
- Smith Spark, Anna (2019). "A Hero of Her People". In Whates, Ian (ed.). Legends 3: Stories in Honour of David Gemmell. Newcon Press. ISBN 9781912950201.
- Smith Spark, Anna (2019). "Gold Light". In Speakman, Shawn (ed.). Unbound III: New Tales by Masters of Fantasy. Grim Oak Press. ISBN 9781944145262.
- Smith Spark, Anna (2019). "Stones". In Khlopenko, Alex; Hoffer, Olivia (eds.). Three Crows: Year One: Anthology of Weird Science Fiction and Fantasy. Three Crows Magazine. ISBN 9781079110050.. Originally appeared in Three Crows Magazine issue #2.
- Smith Spark, Anna (2020). "The Second Siege of Telea". In Abbott, Alana Joli; Meadors, Melanie R. (eds.). Knaves: A Blackguards Anthology. Outland Entertainment. ISBN 9781947659384.
- Smith Spark, Anna (2021). "Water". In Hall, Joanne; Garland, Dolly (eds.). Lost Gods. Kristell Ink. ISBN 9781913562045.
- Smith Spark, Anna (2022). "Glory to the King!". In Collins, Adrian; Myers, Mike; Chorn, Sarah (eds.). The King Must Fall. Grimdark Magazine. ISBN 9780648178477.
- Smith Spark, Anna (2023). "Saturday Morning". In O'Regan, Marie; Kane, Paul (eds.). The Other Side of Never: Dark Tales from the World of Peter & Wendy. Titan Books. ISBN 9781803361796.

=== Articles ===
- Smith Spark, Anna (2018). "Finding Your Author Voice". Grimdark Magazine. No. 14.
- Smith Spark, Anna (2019). "Grimdark and Nihilism". Grimdark Magazine.
