= King Arthur II: The Role-Playing Wargame =

- Developer: NeocoreGames
- Publisher: Paradox Interactive
- Series: King Arthur
- Platform: Windows
- Release: January 27, 2012
- Genres: Real-time tactics, turn-based strategy, role-playing
- Mode: Single-player

King Arthur II: The Role-Playing Wargame is a real-time tactics and role-playing video game and a sequel to King Arthur: The Role-Playing Wargame, released online in Europe on September 20, 2011, and then worldwide in 2012. It was developed by NeocoreGames and published by Paradox Interactive. It blends elements of the real-time tactics, role-playing, and grand strategy genres into one.

== Gameplay ==
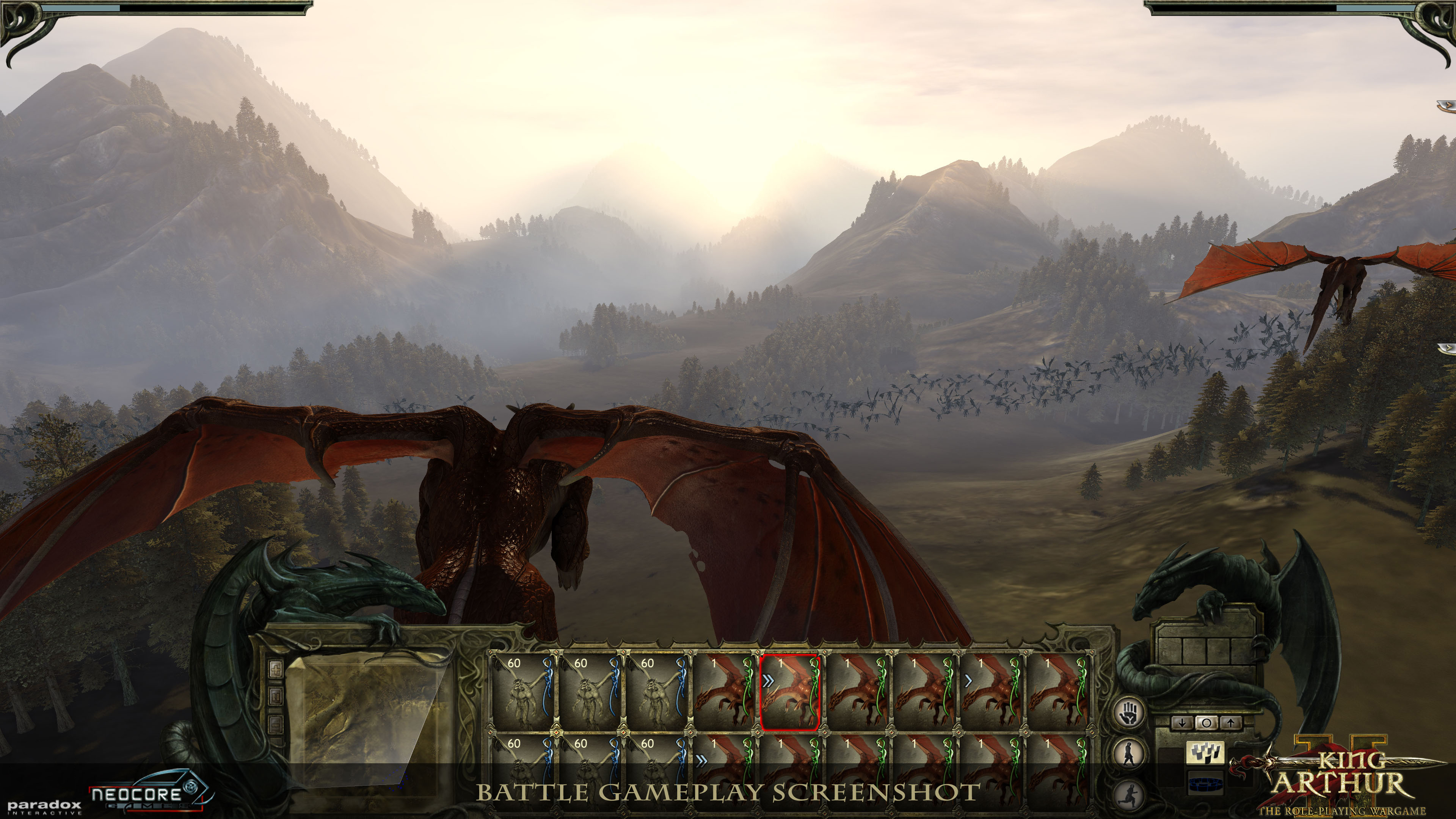
Battle gameplay screenshot

Gameplay in King Arthur II is a mix of real-time strategy, role-playing, and grand strategy elements. The grand strategy portion of the game is played on a large campaign map of Britannia. Unlike its predecessor, King Arthur II does not feature multiplayer.

== Plot ==
There are two campaigns in the game, a prologue with only one chapter, and the main story, spanning several chapters. In the prologue, the player takes the role of Septimus Sulla, heir to one of the Roman families that ruled in Britannia south of Hadrian's Wall. The prologue details Septimus' rise to power and eventual descent into madness.

In the main campaign, the player takes over the role of William Pendragon, son of the once and future King Arthur. Arthur lies mortally stricken by a magical curse and several of the figures of Arthurian legend are missing when William steps up to unite the provinces that once made up Arthur's kingdom, fight back the Fomorians unleashed by the Witch Queen Morgawse from the Orkney Islands and find a way to heal his father.

As in the previous game, other heroes join the army of William and, eventually, a second army led by the sorceress Morgana Le Fay becomes available as William allows her to search in the name of King Arthur for her mentor Merlin, who was kidnapped by the enchantress Lady Nimue. Over the course of the game, Septimus Sulla attacks from the North.

== King Arthur II: Dead Legions ==
An expansion pack King Arthur II: Dead Legions was released alongside the launch of the base game on January 27, 2012, and was released later in Japan on September 7, 2012.

== Reception ==
Reception

Aggregate score
Aggregator	Score
Metacritic	66/100

Review scores
Publication	Score
Destructoid	7/10
Eurogamer	5/10
Game Informer	10/10
GameSpot	5.5/10
GameSpy	2/5
GamesRadar+	3.5/5
IGN	6/10
PC Gamer (UK)	77%
PC PowerPlay	6/10
The Digital Fix	7/10
The Escapist	3/5

The game received "average" reviews according to the review aggregation website Metacritic. From release, the game was plagued with various bugs. A string of patches were deployed to address these issues within days of release.
