= NeocoreGames =

Hungarian video game developer

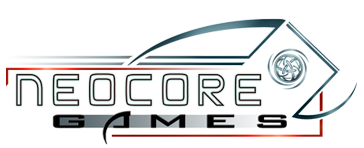
- Industry: Video games
- Founded: 2005
- Headquarters: Budapest, Hungary
- Products: King Arthur series
- Website: neocoregames.com

NeocoreGames is a Hungarian video game developer that focuses on creating and publishing role-playing video games. The company has their own development studio that is headquartered in Budapest, and the video games developed at NeocoreGames are created using their custom-built game engine named Coretech. The company is best known for their King Arthur series.

== History ==
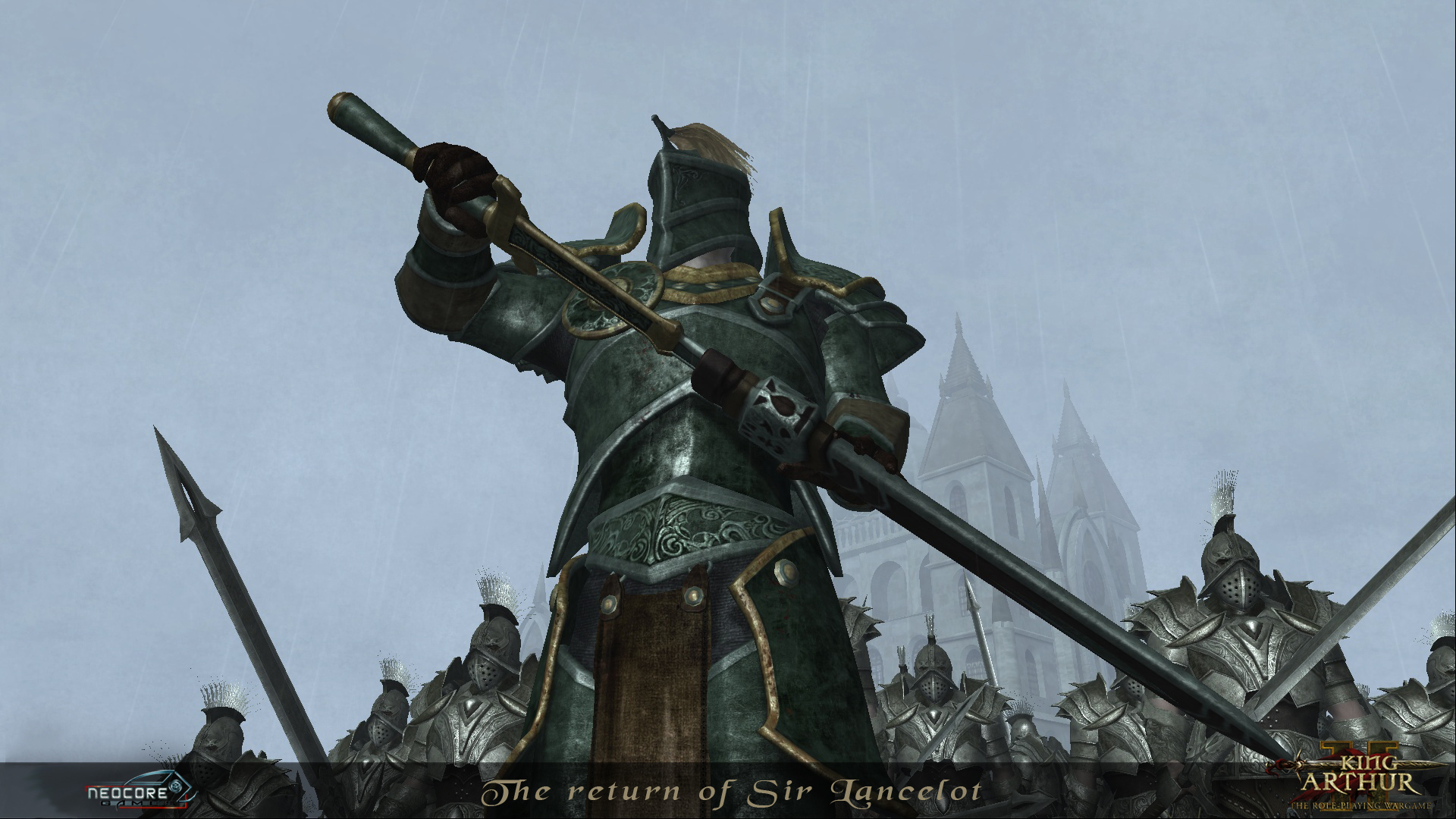
Screenshot from the video game King Arthur II was created using the in-house game engine Coretech 2.

NeocoreGames was founded in 2005 and began working as a small game development studio. The studio is known for their work in the role-playing game genre exemplified by their King Arthur: The Role-Playing Wargame series. The sequel, King Arthur II: The Role-Playing Wargame, was developed using Coretech 2, NeocoreGames's new game engine.

In 2012 with the announcement of the action-RPG The Incredible Adventures of Van Helsing and the party-based tactical RPG Broken Sea, NeocoreGames has returned to independent video game development. In May 2012 the company announced the development of a role-playing game based on Bram Stoker's Dracula. Titled The Incredible Adventures of Van Helsing, the game follows Van Helsing's son as he travels to the eastern-European kingdom of Borgovia to slay the monsters that are overrunning the land. The game was to be the start of a new intellectual property for NeocoreGames. In June 2012 at the Electronic Entertainment Expo, NeocoreGames announced a second new game they were developing: Broken Sea is a fantasy tactical role-playing game developed for the PC. In August 2014, NeocoreGames announced their first tower defense game, titled Deathtrap. In February 2017, NeocoreGames launched the Founding for their Action-RPG titled Warhammer 40,000: Inquisitor – Martyr.

== Games developed ==
| Title | Year | Platform | Type |
|---|---|---|---|
| Crusaders: Thy Kingdom Come | 2009 | Windows | Full game |
| King Arthur: The Role-Playing Wargame | 2009 | Windows | Full game |
| King Arthur – Legendary Artifacts | 2010 | Windows | Downloadable content |
| King Arthur – Knights and Vassals | 2010 | Windows | Downloadable content |
| King Arthur – The Saxons | 2010 | Windows | Downloadable content |
| King Arthur – The Druids | 2010 | Windows | Downloadable content |
| The Kings' Crusade | 2010 | Windows | Full game |
| The Kings' Crusade: Arabian Nights | 2011 | Windows | Downloadable content |
| The Kings' Crusade: Teutonic Knights | 2011 | Windows | Downloadable content |
| The Kings' Crusade: New Allies | 2011 | Windows | Downloadable content |
| King Arthur: Fallen Champions | 2011 | Windows | Stand-alone expansion |
| King Arthur II: The Role-Playing Wargame | 2012 | Windows | Full game |
| King Arthur II: Dead Legions | 2012 | Windows | Downloadable content |
| The Incredible Adventures of Van Helsing | 2013 | Windows, PlayStation 4, Xbox One | Full game |
| Van Helsing: Blue Blood | 2013 | Windows, PlayStation 4, Xbox One | Downloadable content |
| Van Helsing: Thaumaturge | 2013 | Windows, PlayStation 4, Xbox One | Downloadable content |
| Van Helsing: Arcane Mechanic | 2013 | Windows, PlayStation 4, Xbox One | Downloadable content |
| The Incredible Adventures of Van Helsing II | 2014 | Windows, PlayStation 4, Xbox One | Full game |
| Van Helsing II: Ink Hunt | 2014 | Windows, PlayStation 4, Xbox One | Downloadable content |
| Van Helsing II: Pigasus | 2014 | Windows, PlayStation 4, Xbox One | Downloadable content |
| Deathtrap | 2015 | Windows, PlayStation 4, Xbox One | Full game |
| The Incredible Adventures of Van Helsing III | 2015 | Windows, PlayStation 4, Xbox One | Full game |
| The Incredible Adventures of Van Helsing: Final Cut | 2015 | Windows | Full game |
| Warhammer 40,000: Inquisitor – Martyr | 2018 | Windows, PlayStation 4, PlayStation 5, Xbox One, Xbox Series X/S | Full game |
| Warhammer 40,000: Inquisitor – Prophecy | 2019 | Windows, PlayStation 4, PlayStation 5, Xbox One, Xbox Series X/S | Stand-alone expansion |
| Warhammer 40,000: Inquisitor – Martyr: Sororitas Class | 2022 | Windows, PlayStation 4, PlayStation 5, Xbox One, Xbox Series X/S | Downloadable content |
| King Arthur: Knight's Tale | 2022 | Windows, PlayStation 5, Xbox Series X/S | Full game |
| King Arthur: Legion IX | 2024 | Windows | Stand-alone expansion |
