= Kindergarten (video game) =

- Developers: Con Man Games; Sean Young
- Publisher: SmashGames
- Artist: Sean Young
- Writer: Connor Boyle
- Engine: Unity
- Platforms: Linux; macOS; Windows
- Release: June 15, 2017
- Genres: Puzzle, adventure
- Mode: Single-player

Kindergarten is a 2017 puzzle adventure game developed by Con Man Games alongside Sean Young and published by SmashGames for Windows and macOS in June. In July, it was released for Linux.

It follows an unnamed child who keeps repeating the same day, with the main goal of finding out what happened to a missing classmate. The game employs interconnected character quests across the repeated days and includes dark humor.

According to the developers, it was inspired by painful childhood memories. The game received praise for its writing and comedy, while criticism was directed at the repetition of dialogue and sometimes of entire quests.

A sequel, called Kindergarten 2, was released in 2019. In 2025, Kindergarten 3 was launched. A fourth installment, Kindergarten 4, was also teased.

== Gameplay ==
A classroom scene in Kindergarten.

The player takes control of a young child, who goes to a kindergarten. The main gameplay loop consists of playing the same day (Monday) again and again. By making different choices in each attempt, including who to interact with, the player can cause drastically different events to take place.

When a day starts, the player can choose to withdraw money from a piggy bank in the starting hub. A day is divided into five sections: before school, class, lunch time, play time and "show and tell". The actions the protagonist can take within each period of time are limited, represented in-game by apples in the lower right corner of the screen. Once every apple is used, the game advances to the next section. Unused apples can be traded for money, which is useful for buying items.

On each new attempt, the player can choose a classmate (or the teacher) and complete their quest. By performing certain actions over the course of the day, they ultimately receive a special item. These objects are added permanently to the protagonist's home and the player can choose to bring them into new loops, which sometimes is essential for certain quests. Other inventory items are reset between days, and characters killed during an attempt come back in the next. If the player makes the wrong choice during a quest, they might have to restart the current section of the day, or even the entire day if the problem came from earlier.

Collectible cards, known as Monstermon cards, can be found throughout the game. They can be obtained by multiple methods, such as exploring certain areas and completing quests. If all Monstermon cards in the game are collected, a secret ending is unlocked.

The game has a hint system. Individual clues are unlocked during play and provide guidance on how to progress through quests.

== Plot ==
=== Setting ===
The kindergarten is a brutal place where the students might be killed for various reasons. One of the children, Billy, has gone missing. The protagonist's goal is to find out what happened to him. In order to do that, he must help different characters in their own quests across repeated versions of Monday. By doing so, the main character is able to complete Lily's quest and uncover the truth.

The principal is a suspicious individual who wants to prevent others from investigating Billy's disappearance. His methods include giving them either a strange pill to make them "happy" or a listening device that will explode if the individual gets too close to the truth. Moreover, it is said that children who get expelled from the kindergarten are never heard from again.

The janitor is an older man who is prone to violence at the slightest annoyance. He is often important during other characters' quests. He was responsible for killing Cindy's dog.

=== Quests ===
- Jerome: He is the "cool kid", and also the principal's son. His quest involves retrieving his confiscated laser pointer.
- Monty: He is a nerdy kid with glasses, capable of reading. He also runs a shop in the schoolyard that sells items such as cigarettes. His quest consists of raising enough money to pay for a copy of the principal's office key.
- Ms. Applegate: She is a school teacher who detests children. Her quest involves eliminating the protagonist's classmates.
- Buggs: He is the school bully, who often steals money from other children. He has a crush on Cindy. He plans to use the protagonist's assistance to murder Ms. Applegate and avoid punishment.
- Cindy: She is a mean girl, with a rough family life, who previously owned a dog named Biscuit. She wants the main character to be her boyfriend if he agrees to torment a girl named Lily. Cindy also plays house with him.
- Nugget: He is a strange kid who used to be Billy's friend before he disappeared. He also has a crush on Lily. His quest includes a sequence of tasks, which must be completed in order to earn his friendship and access to Nugget's secret cave. Consequently, he entrusts the protagonist with a note written by Billy himself.
- Lily: She is Billy's sister. She is determined to find her brother, and is especially suspicious of the principal. Her quest is also the final quest of the main story. By working alongside the main character, she is able to find an underground lab where Billy is being kept.

=== Normal ending ===
The protagonist and Lily find Billy, who was mutated by the principal's experiments and is being held alongside bizarre creatures. They manage to reverse the mutation, but the principal appears and threatens to kill them. He gets slaughtered by one of the creatures instead, which allows the three children to escape. Lily and Billy reward the protagonist with a special Monstermon card as well as a collector's guide to find the ones remaining.

=== Secret ending ===
It can be triggered during Nugget's quest, if all Monstermon cards have been collected. The sky turns red and lightning starts killing multiple characters in sequence, except for Nugget and the protagonist. It ends with a fourth-wall-breaking announcement of Kindergarten 2.

== Development and release ==
Kindergarten had Connor Boyle as its lead writer and Sean Young as its artist and developer.

The game was initially a horror title, with minor roguelike elements. However, it changed drastically due to Young's suggestion that the game follow a group of children at school. Boyle mentioned he used his own negative experiences during childhood to shape the project.

The developers were aware that the repetition could cause problems, so they decided to implement multiple methods to maintain the gameplay style without boring the player. One of them was using dark humor. According to Boyle, the writing would often come as a consequence of Young's art pieces. He compared the game's humor to that of Happy Tree Friends, with a cute art style where things become grotesque.

Another design choice conceived to generate replayability was crafting multiple paths for each room, as well as hiding Monstermon cards, the main collectables, throughout the game. Boyle also consciously avoided writing long dialogues.

The game was available in early access by April 2017. It received its full release on Steam on June 15, 2017. By August 2017, Gamasutra reported it had sold almost 100,000 copies.

== Reception ==
Reception

Review scores
Publication	Score
HonestGamers	4/5
OldGamesItalia	DA GIOCARE ("Worth playing")

The game was often praised for its writing and dark humor. It received comparisons to the movie Groundhog Day due to its time loop premise, as well as the game Pony Island since its cute presentation hides dreadful content. At the same time, it received criticism for repeated dialogue and the need to restart quests after even small mistakes.

Parker Lynch, writing for El Observador, called an early access version of the game a "refreshing addition to the puzzle genre", while pointing out the glitches and typos still present.

A review from Automaton Media, by Ryuki Ishii, called the puzzles somewhat difficult. Kotaku's Tegan Jones compared it to the "Nightmare Cafeteria" story from Treehouse of Horror V (from The Simpsons), drawing attention to the heavy themes. Joseph Shaffer, writing for HonestGamers, highlighted how the game played with common childhood anxieties. He also praised the puzzles and character storylines, saying that it "requires some thought while not bogging you down with obtuse puzzles". At the same time, the reviewer welcomed the hint system, calling it "straightforward directions" and pointing out how it allows the player to obtain help without the need to search for external guides.

== Sequels ==
Kindergarten 2 was released on Steam on July 30, 2019. It expands on the first game, with nine quests, 50 collectible Monstermon cards and several outfits. It features a new school where the children have been reassigned, with a time loop on a Tuesday instead of a Monday.

Kindergarten 3 was released on Steam on June 18, 2025. It takes place on Wednesday. The characters, both new and returning, are sent to a school where the principal and some children have disappeared.

Kindergarten 4 was teased during the secret ending of Kindergarten 3.
