= Vydavnytstvo Zhupanskogo =

- Founded: August 2007
- Founder: Oleh Zhupanskyi; Oleksii Zhupanskyi
- Country of origin: Ukraine
- Headquarters location: Bucha, Kyiv Oblast, Ukraine
- Key people: Oleh Zhupanskyi; Oleksii Zhupanskyi
- Fiction genres: Literary fiction, science fiction, horror, children's literature, poetry, biography
- Official website: publisher.in.ua

Vydavnytstvo Zhupanskogo (Ukrainian: Видавництво Жупанського, lit. "Zhupanskyi Publishing House") is an independent Ukrainian book publisher founded in August 2007 by Oleh Ivanovych Zhupanskyi and his son Oleksii Olehovych Zhupanskyi, headquartered in Bucha, Kyiv Oblast. The publishing house specialises primarily in translated world literature, classical and contemporary, with a strong focus on intellectual prose, science fiction, horror and gothic fiction, as well as debut works by Ukrainian authors in genre fiction. In 2018 the publisher received the European Science Fiction Society (ESFS) Award as the best European publisher working with science fiction.

== History ==
=== Foundation and early years (2007–2010) ===
Prior to founding Vydavnytstvo Zhupanskogo, Oleh Zhupanskyi had led the publisher «Yunivers», under which he launched a Nobel Prize Laureates translation series in the early 2000s. When he and his son established the new family publishing house in Bucha in 2007, this series transferred to the new imprint from 2008 onward and became one of its central pillars. The founders declared their mission to publish "high-quality and relevant literature", filling gaps in the Ukrainian book market with works that had shaped world culture. At the time of the publisher's founding, the Ukrainian-language book market faced considerable difficulties: it was flooded with Russian-language editions, and print runs of Ukrainian-language books of around 1,000 copies could take years to sell. Despite this, Oleksii Zhupanskyi chose to publish what he personally considered important, even when commercial prospects were modest.

Among the earliest titles were Ukrainian translations of Nobel Prize laureates including Henryk Sienkiewicz, Thomas Mann and Bernard Shaw, as well as philosophical essays by Henri Bergson, works previously unavailable in Ukrainian. In 2010 the Ukrainian translation of Salman Rushdie's The Enchantress of Florence published by the house won the national Knyha Roku (Book of the Year) award. Around the same period, the art-documentary volume by Jan-Pieter Hinrichs Lemberg–Lwów–Lviv received a special jury commendation at the Lviv Book Forum, and Robert Musil's The Man Without Qualities in translation won the grand prize for Best Book at the 17th Lviv Forum.

=== Expansion and genre fiction (2011–2018) ===
In 2011 the publisher launched the «Laureates of the Andersen Prize» children's literature series, dedicated to winners of the Hans Christian Andersen Award. During the first decade and a half, landmark translations included James Joyce's Ulysses, George Orwell's 1984, and works by Jean-Paul Sartre, William Faulkner, W. B. Yeats, Thomas Pynchon and Salman Rushdie. The publisher also undertook a multi-volume collected works edition of Antoine de Saint-Exupéry, for which translator Petro Tarashchuk received the Grand Prix of the French Cultural Centre and the Embassy of France in Ukraine.

Around the mid-2010s, the publishing house made a strategic shift by expanding into genre fiction — principally horror, gothic prose and science fiction. In 2016 the first volume of a complete Ukrainian edition of H. P. Lovecraft's prose was released with a print run of 5,000 copies. Demand exceeded expectations: the run sold out in approximately two years, and total sales of the first volume (including reprints) reached 9,000 copies, demonstrating a previously underestimated Ukrainian readership for horror literature. All four volumes of Lovecraft's prose were ultimately published, illustrated in an "urban gothic" style and accompanied by themed promotional merchandise. The success of this project effectively launched wider Ukrainian publisher interest in Lovecraft.

The same period saw the launch of the «Ad Astra» science fiction series. A planned 2017 visit to Lviv by Canadian science fiction author Peter Watts had to be cancelled when translators failed to deliver a manuscript on time, causing a public discussion in Ukrainian literary circles about publishing ethics and translator obligations. Despite this setback, the series continued to grow: titles by Dan Simmons (The Terror), Peter Watts (Blindsight, Echopraxia) and a planned multi-volume edition of Philip K. Dick short stories were all published or announced. In 2018 Vydavnytstvo Zhupanskogo received the European Science Fiction Society Award as the best European publisher specialising in science fiction, an honour the director described as "an advance on the future" and a recognition of the publisher's international standing.

=== Late 2010s and further achievements (2019–2021) ===
In 2019 the publisher released the first Ukrainian translation of John Milton's Paradise Lost as a lavishly illustrated edition, which was recognised at the Lviv Book Forum as the most beautiful book of the year. In 2020 the Ukrainian translation of Dan Simmons's The Terror was named best translated foreign book at BookForum Best Book Award 2020 in Lviv. In 2021 the Ukrainian edition of the Elder Edda (Old Norse epic poetry) won the BookForum Best Book Award in the category "Classic Literature in Ukrainian Translation".

The publisher also began issuing original works by Ukrainian authors in genre fiction under the «Alternatyva» series, including debut novels by Volodymyr Kuznietsov, Ostap Ukrainets, Yevhen Lir and Maksym Hakh. Kuznietsov's debut novel Zakołot. Nevymovni Kulty (Revolt. The Unspeakable Cults), a Lovecraftian mystical-thriller, won the international Chrysalis Awards 2020 for promising new speculative fiction authors at Eurocon.

=== Impact of the Russian invasion (2022–present) ===
The full-scale Russian invasion of Ukraine in February 2022 severely affected the publishing house. During the Russian occupation of Bucha in spring 2022, Russian forces deliberately destroyed the publisher's warehouse, burning the majority of its print stock, finished books and paper supplies — one of the first deliberate acts of cultural destruction carried out by occupying forces in the town. Books that survived the fire, often with scorched covers, were sold online as "books from the flames" to raise funds for recovery. Despite the loss of its warehouse, the publisher resumed printing new titles in the second half of 2022 with small print runs, and by 2023 had announced an ambitious programme for 2024–2025 including a new translation of Alfred Döblin's Mountains, Seas and Giants, a Françoise Sagan trilogy, new titles in the «Alternatyva» series, and an anthology of contemporary European gothic novellas. Director Oleksii Zhupanskyi also announced his own authorial debut, a fantasy novel cycle titled The Wheel of the Year, the first volume of which — The Burning Eye of Summer. Harvest of Dreams — was announced for publication.

== Publishing series ==
=== Ad Astra ===
Science fiction series (from the Latin "to the stars"). Titles include Peter Watts's Blindsight and Echopraxia, Dan Simmons's The Terror, and a planned multi-volume edition of Philip K. Dick short stories.

=== Ad Noctum ===
Horror and gothic fiction series, conceived as a "nocturnal twin" of the Ad Astra series. Its inaugural title was Skotomohylnyk by Dimka Uzhasnyi, described as dedicated to "contemporary horror and literature of liminal states".

=== Alternatyva ===
Series for original Ukrainian-language genre fiction, providing a platform for non-mainstream Ukrainian prose in horror, weird fiction and alternative history. Titles include Zakołot. Nevymovni Kulty by Volodymyr Kuznietsov (winner of Chrysalis Award 2020), Trans by Ostap Ukrainets, Pidzeminni Richky Techut' by Yevhen Lir, and Prohuliuiuchys Pustelieiu by Maksym Hakh.

=== Amalgama ===
Translated dark prose from Polish authors combining elements of fantasy, horror and magical realism. Titles include Holokost F by Cezary Zbierzchowski and Holova Zmiia (The Snake's Head) by Łukasz Orbitowski.

=== Masters of Gothic Prose ===
Dedicated to classic Anglo-American horror of the late 19th and early 20th centuries, including three volumes of the complete prose of H. P. Lovecraft, and collections by Robert W. Chambers, Abraham Merritt and Ambrose Bierce.

=== Masters of World Prose ===
Landmark translated works of 20th-century world literature, including James Joyce's Ulysses, George Orwell's 1984, Louis-Ferdinand Céline's Death on Credit, Michel Tournier's The Erl-King, Robert Walser's The Robber, and Boualem Sansal's 2084.

=== Nobel Prize Laureates ===
One of the publisher's oldest series, originally launched under the imprint Yunivers in 2000 and transferred to Vydavnytstvo Zhupanskogo from 2008. Titles include works by Thomas Mann, John Steinbeck, Henrik Sienkiewicz, Selma Lagerlöf, Ernest Hemingway, Nadine Gordimer and J. M. G. Le Clézio.

=== Laureates of the Andersen Prize ===
Children's literature series launched in 2011, featuring works by winners of the Hans Christian Andersen Award, including Astrid Lindgren, Tove Jansson, A. A. Milne, Gianni Rodari and Selma Lagerlöf.

=== Terra Poetica ===
Poetry series covering both Ukrainian and international verse, including the anthology Litposhta, a collection of poems by young contemporary Ukrainian poets conceived as a form of literary correspondence between contributors.

=== Zhyttepysy (Biographies) ===
Series of biographies and memoirs, including Sebastian Haffner's Churchill: A Biography (2019) and Hitler: A Study in Tyranny (2018), and David Lynch and Kristine McKenna's memoir Room to Dream (2020).

== Awards and recognition ==
Year	Award	Title / Category
2010	Knyha Roku (Book of the Year), Ukraine	Salman Rushdie, The Enchantress of Florence (Ukrainian translation)
2010s	Lviv Book Forum — Special Commendation	Jan-Pieter Hinrichs, Lemberg–Lwów–Lviv
2010s	Lviv Book Forum — Grand Prix, Best Book	Robert Musil, The Man Without Qualities (trans. Oleksa Lohvynenko)
2018	European Science Fiction Society Award	Best European Publisher (science fiction)
2019	Lviv Book Forum — Most Beautiful Book	John Milton, Paradise Lost (Ukrainian translation)
2020	BookForum Best Book Award	Dan Simmons, The Terror — Best Translated Foreign Book
2020	Chrysalis Award (Eurocon)	Volodymyr Kuznietsov, Zakołot. Nevymovni Kulty
2021	BookForum Best Book Award	Elder Edda — Best Classic Literature in Ukrainian Translation

== Critical reception ==
The publisher has been widely praised for the quality of its translations and editorial standards, with commentators noting its systematic role in filling gaps in the Ukrainian literary landscape and legitimising previously marginalised genres. A notable editorial controversy arose around the Ukrainian translation of Fernand Braudel's The Identity of France: several reviews in Ukrainian media identified stylistic and semantic shortcomings, raising questions about the adequacy of rendering complex academic discourse — a criticism that contrasted with the publisher's stated ambition to produce reference-quality translations for academic gaps in the market.

== See also ==
- Ukrainian literature
- Lviv Book Forum
- Bucha
