= Richard Anderson (artist) =

American concept artist, illustrator, and painter

- Known for: Concept art; Cover art; Illustration
- Awards: Spectrum Award – Institutional 2011 Knight March; Art Directors Guild Award for Excellence in Production Design for a Fantasy Film 2015 Guardians of the Galaxy; Gemmell Award – Best Fantasy Cover Art 2018 Kings of the Wyld
- Website: flaptrapsart.com

Richard Anderson is an American concept artist, illustrator, and painter. He won the Gold Spectrum Award in 2011, the Art Directors Guild Award for Excellence in Production Design for a Fantasy Film in 2015, and he was the final person to win the Gemmell Award for Best Fantasy Cover Art.

He has created artwork used on dozens of book covers, concept art used in the production of several films, and has worked both freelance and for specific companies in his career.

== Biography ==
Richard Anderson is a native of Montana, where he lived in a trailer house. He began drawing when he was young, and had difficulty in school. After graduating high school, he began attending The Art Institute of Seattle, where he graduated after focusing on his drawing.

In 2003, he began working as an artist at NCSoft (specifically at ArenaNet), where he worked on the Guild Wars games. After working at NCSoft for eight-and-a-half years, he moved to MPC, where he worked through 2011. He won the 2011 Gold Spectrum Award in the Institutional category for Knight March, and he has since been included multiple times in Spectrum. He then worked at Framestore until October 2013, after which he began working for Rocksteady Studios.

He was nominated for the 2014 BSFA Award for Best Artwork for The Mirror Empire. Along with other members of the art department, he won the Art Directors Guild Award for Excellence in Production Design for a Fantasy Film in 2015 for his work as a senior concept artist on the film Guardians of the Galaxy.

Anderson was nominated in 2016 for the Chesley Award for Best Cover Illustration – Hardcover for The Dinosaur Lords. That same year, Anderson was also nominated for the World Fantasy Award for Best Artist. In 2018, he was the final person to win the Gemmell Award for Best Fantasy Cover Art for Kings of the Wyld.

He also does freelance work through is studio, Flaptraps Art. He uses standard sketches on paper for some projects, but he also uses a Cintiq tablet so he can work directly in Photoshop from the beginning. He also uses 3D tools like SketchUp, Maya, 3ds Max, and modo in his visualization work.

== Works ==
=== Cover art ===
Anderson created the cover art for the following:

- A Grey Moon Over China by Thomas A. Day (March 2010, Tor Books, ISBN 978-0-7653-6105-9)
- Ghosts of Ascalon by Matt Forbeck and Jeff Grubb (August 2010, Pocket Star Books, ISBN 978-1-4165-8947-1)
- The Iron Shirts by Michael F. Flynn (April 2011, Tor.com, ISBN 978-1-4299-3017-8)
- Ragnarok by Paul Park (May 2011, Tor.com, ISBN 978-1-4299-3698-9)
- Seven Princes by John R. Fultz (January 2012, Orbit Books, ISBN 978-0-316-18786-2)
- Among the Silvering Herd by A. M. Dellamonica (February 2012, Tor.com, ISBN 978-1-4668-0816-4)
- The Scar by Marina Dyachenko and Sergey Dyachenko (February 2012, Tor Books, ISBN 978-0-7653-2993-6)
- Spin the Sky by Katy Stauber (June 2012, Night Shade Books, ISBN 978-1-59780-340-3)
- Faster Gun by Elizabeth Bear (August 2012, Tor.com, ISBN 978-1-4668-2609-0)
- Seven Kings by John R. Fultz (January 2013, Orbit Books, ISBN 978-0-316-18783-1)
- Last Train to Jubilee Bay by Kali Wallace (February 2013, Tor.com, ISBN 978-1-4668-3754-6)
- Terrain by Genevieve Valentine (March 2013, Tor.com, ISBN 978-1-4668-3924-3)
- Seven Sorcerers by John R. Fultz (December 2013, Orbit Books, ISBN 978-0-316-18785-5)
- Subterranean Magazine, Winter 2014 cover (December 2013, Subterranean Press)
- The Anderson Project edited by David G. Hartwell (January 2014, Tor.com, ISBN 978-1-4668-6510-5)
- The Cartography of Sudden Death by Charlie Jane Anders (January 2014, Tor.com, ISBN 978-1-4668-6353-8)
- The Emperor's Blades by Brian Staveley (January 2014, Tor Books, ISBN 978-0-7653-3640-8)
- The Ugly Woman of Castello di Putti by A. M. Dellamonica (April 2014, Tor.com, ISBN 978-1-4668-6838-0)
- The Colonel by Peter Watts (July 2014, Tor.com, ISBN 978-1-4668-7647-7)
- Echopraxia by Peter Watts (August 2014, Tor Books, ISBN 978-0-7653-2802-1)
- The Mirror Empire by Kameron Hurley (August 2014, Angry Robot, ISBN 978-0-85766-556-0)
- The Providence of Fire by Brian Staveley (January 2015, Tor Books, ISBN 978-0-7653-3641-5)
- When the Heavens Fall by Marc Turner (May 2015, Tor Books, ISBN 978-0-7653-3712-2)
- The Sea of Trolls by Nancy Farmer (June 2015, Saga Press, ISBN 978-1-4814-4308-1)
- The Dinosaur Lords by Victor Milán (July 2015, Tor Books, ISBN 978-0-7653-3296-7)
- The Land of the Silver Apples by Nancy Farmer (July 2015, Saga Press, ISBN 978-1-4814-4309-8)
- Time Salvager by Wesley Chu (July 2015, Tor Books, ISBN 978-0-7653-7718-0)
- The Islands of the Blessed by Nancy Farmer (August 2015, Saga Press, ISBN 978-1-4814-4310-4)
- Sunset Mantle by Alter S. Reiss (September 2015, Tor.com, ISBN 978-0-7653-8521-5)
- Empire Ascendant by Kameron Hurley (October 2015, Angry Robot, ISBN 978-0-85766-559-1)
- The Builders by Daniel Polansky (November 2015, Tor.com, ISBN 978-0-7653-8530-7)
- The Glass Galago by A. M. Dellamonica (January 2016, Tor.com, ISBN 978-0-7653-8502-4)
- The Grimm Future edited by Erin Underwood (February 2016, NESFA Press, ISBN 978-1-61037-315-9)
- The Last Mortal Bond by Brian Staveley (March 2016, Tor Books, ISBN 978-0-7653-3642-2)
- The Dinosaur Knights by Victor Milán (July 2016, Tor Books, ISBN 978-0-7653-3297-4)
- Time Siege by Wesley Chu (July 2016, Angry Robot, ISBN 978-0-7653-7754-8)
- The Forgetting Moon by Brian Lee Durfee (August 2016, Saga Press, ISBN 978-1-4814-6522-9)
- Red Tide by Marc Turner (September 2016, Tor Books, ISBN 978-0-7653-3714-6)
- The Burning Light by Bradley P. Beaulieu and Rob Ziegler (November 2016, Tor.com, ISBN 978-0-7653-9086-8)
- Kings of the Wyld by Nicholas Eames (February 2017, Orbit Books, ISBN 978-0-316-36247-4)
- Losing Heart Among the Tall by A. M. Dellamonica (February 2017, Tor.com, ISBN 978-0-7653-9474-3)
- Skullsworn by Brian Staveley (April 2017, Tor Books, ISBN 978-0-7653-8987-9)
- River of Teeth by Sarah Gailey (May 2017, Tor.com, ISBN 978-0-7653-9523-8)
- The Dinosaur Princess by Victor Milán (August 2017, Tor Books, ISBN 978-0-7653-3298-1)
- Taste of Marrow by Sarah Gailey (September 2017, Tor.com, ISBN 978-0-7653-9525-2)
- The Stone in the Skull by Elizabeth Bear (October 2017, Tor Books, ISBN 978-0-7653-8013-5)
- Bloody Rose by Nicholas Eames (August 2018, Orbit Books, ISBN 978-0-316-36253-5)
- War Cry by Brian McClellan (August 2018, Tor.com, ISBN 978-1-250-17016-3)
- The Gutter Prayer by Gareth Hanrahan (January 2019, Orbit Books, ISBN 978-0-356-51151-1)
- Ship of Smoke and Steel by Django Wexler (January 2019, Tor Teen, ISBN 978-0-7653-9724-9)
- The Blackest Heart by Brian Lee Durfee (February 2019, Saga Press, ISBN 978-1-4814-6525-0)
- The Red-Stained Wings by Elizabeth Bear (May 2010, Tor Books, ISBN 978-0-7653-8015-9)
- Dragonslayer by Duncan M. Hamilton (July 2019, Tor Books, ISBN 978-1-250-30673-9)
- The Black Hawks by David Wragg (October 2019, Harper Voyager, ISBN 978-0-00-833141-2)
- The Menace from Farside by Ian McDonald (November 2019, Tor.com, ISBN 978-1-250-24779-7)
- Knight of the Silver Circle by Duncan M. Hamilton (November 2019, Tor Books, ISBN 978-1-250-30682-1)
- The Broken Heavens by Kameron Hurley (January 2020, Angry Robot, ISBN 978-0-85766-562-1)
- City of Stone and Silence by Django Wexler (January 2020, Tor Teen, ISBN 978-0-7653-9727-0)
- The Shadow Saint by Gareth Hanrahan (January 2020, Orbit Books, ISBN 978-0-316-52535-0)
- Servant of the Crown by Duncan M. Hamilton (March 2020, Tor Books, ISBN 978-1-250-30685-2)

=== Films ===
Anderson worked as a concept artist on the following films:

- Prometheus (2012)
- Thor: The Dark World (2013)
- World War Z (2013)
- Edge of Tomorrow (2014)
- Guardians of the Galaxy (2014)
- Transformers: The Last Knight (2017)
- Captain Marvel (2019)

He worked as a digital artist on The Kid Who Would Be King in 2019.

== Reception ==
Anderson's work has been described as "explosive, [with] energy to every line", "raw, colourful" and "tense and mature...". Sarah Gailey, the author of River of Teeth, stated "[h]is covers are dynamic and gorgeous...[rendering] a world in broad, luminous strokes."

=== Awards and honors ===
Year	Organization	Award title, Category	Work	Result	Refs
2011	Spectrum Fantastic Art	Spectrum Award, Institutional	Knight March	Gold	
2014	British Science Fiction Association	BSFA Award, Best Artwork	The Mirror Empire	Nominated	
2015	Art Directors Guild	Art Directors Guild Award, Excellence in Production Design for a Fantasy Film	Guardians of the Galaxy	Won	
2016	Association of Science Fiction and Fantasy Artists	Chesley Award, Best Cover Illustration – Hardcover	The Dinosaur Lords	Nominated	
2016	World Fantasy Convention	World Fantasy Award, Artist	-	Nominated	
2018	Gemmell Awards	Gemmell Award, Best Fantasy Cover Art	Kings of the Wyld	Won	
