= Bloody Rose =

Fantasy novel by Nicholas Eames

- Author: Nicholas Eames
- Cover artist: Richard Anderson
- Language: English
- Series: The Band
- Genre: Fantasy
- Published: August 28, 2018
- Publisher: Orbit
- Publication place: Canada
- Pages: 560
- Awards: 2018 BookNest Fantasy award for "Best Traditionally Published Novel"; 2018 r/Fantasy Stabby Award for "Best Novel"
- ISBN: 0-356-50904-4
- OCLC: 989026564
- Preceded by: Kings of the Wyld
- Followed by: Outlaw Empire
- Website: nicholaseames.com/bloody-rose/

Bloody Rose is the second book in The Band trilogy, a fantasy series written by Nicholas Eames. The book is the sequel to Kings of the Wyld.

== Background ==
The series is published by Orbit Books. The first book was influenced by 60s and 70s rock while Bloody Rose is influenced by 80s rock. The third book will be entitled "Outlaw Empire".

== Plot ==
The story begins six years after the end of Kings of the Wyld. The story is told from the perspective of a bard named Tam who joins the band called Fable, which is led by Bloody Rose. Mercenary bands have taken to fighting monsters in arenas for money rather than adventure into the Heartwyld to obtain a bounty. Tam Hashford auditions for her role as the bard by singing a song called "Together", which was written by her mother.

== Reception ==
The Publishers Weekly review praises the book saying "This is a messy, glorious romp worthy of multiple encores." Jason Heller wrote at NPR that "[h]umorous twists and pulse-ratcheting action abound in Bloody Rose, but its Eames' knack for heart-wrenching poignancy that makes his warm, wonderful fantasy so harmonious."

=== Awards ===
Award	Date	Category	Result	Ref.
BookNest Fantasy Award	2018	Best Traditionally Published Novel	Won	
r/Fantasy Stabby Award	2018	Best Novel	Won	
