= Stet (short story) =

"STET"
- Short story by Sarah Gailey
- Country: United States
- Language: English
- Genres: science fiction, literary fiction

Publication
- Publisher: Fireside Magazine
- Publication date: October 2018

"Stet" (stylized STET) is a science fiction short story by Sarah Gailey, about self-driving cars. It was first published in Fireside Magazine in October 2018.

== Synopsis ==
Rather than being a narrative, "Stet" is presented as a scientific paper analyzing the principles by which self-driving cars make decisions. The paper is interspersed with suggestions to remove or change content which the journal editor finds inappropriate, to each of which the paper's author responds "stet".

== Reception ==
"Stet" was a finalist for the 2019 Hugo Award for Best Short Story and the 2019 Locus Award for Best Short Story.

At Boing Boing, Cory Doctorow described it as "a beautiful piece of innovative storytelling" and "a wonderful gem".
