= Brian Staveley =

American fantasy writer

Brian Staveley is an American fantasy writer. He has written an epic fantasy trilogy, The Chronicle of the Unhewn Throne, the first volume of a sequel series, Ashes of the Unhewn Throne, a prequel novel, Skullsworn, and a selection of short fiction.

== Life ==
Staveley lives in Vermont. He taught literature, philosophy, history, and religion before beginning to write fiction.

== Work ==
=== The Chronicles of the Unhewn Throne ===
Staveley's debut trilogy, The Chronicles of the Unhewn Throne (2014–2016), follows the three children of an assassinated emperor – the monk Kaden, the special forces soldier Valyn and the politician Adare – as they attempt to unravel the conspiracy gripping their continent-spanning empire. The first volume won the Gemmell Morningstar Award for best debut novel and was nominated for the Locus Award and Goodreads Choice Awards.

io9 characterized the first volume as "the year's breakout epic war fantasy" and noted that the trilogy, in a "nice change of pace from most of the epic fantasy landscape", was characterized by a modern mindset, even if it tended to get "sidetracked down rabbit holes" with sub-plots. At Tor.com, Niall Alexander lauded the first volume's skillful use of fantasy tropes but criticized its "manifest mistreatment of women". He considered the final volume a substantial improvement "in the pace and the ultimate punch of its complex plot; and in the quality, on the lexical level, of the author’s already-polished prose". In a starred review, Kirkus Reviews appreciated the third volume as "a deeply satisfying but bleak, dark work; its only illumination are flashes of high tragedy".

=== Skullsworn ===
The first of a projected series of standalone novels about secondary characters in the Chronicles, Staveley's 2017 novel Skullsworn is set several years prior to the events of the trilogy. It sees the apprentice assassin Pyrre returning to her home city where she is to kill seven people – including one whom she loves – in order to become a priestess of the god of death.

Reviewing Skullsworn at Tor.com, Laura M. Hughes described its setting, the swampy river delta city of Dombâng, as the novel's "show-stealer" antagonist, and appreciated Staveley's "more confident, assured" narrative voice. Kirkus Reviews described it as "a pleasantly grim and emotionally complex divertissement", and Publishers Weekly noted the "remarkably intimate" novel's "visceral action scenes and memorable characters".

=== Ashes of the Unhewn Throne ===
Set several years after the events of the first trilogy by the author, Ashes of the Unhewn Throne is a series expected to consist of three or more volumes, the first of which is titled The Empire's Ruin and was published in July 2021.

== Bibliography ==
All cover art by Richard Anderson.

The Chronicles of the Unhewn Throne

1. The Emperor's Blades (2014), Tor Books, ISBN 978-0765336408
2. The Providence of Fire (2015), Tor Books, ISBN 978-0765336415
3. The Last Mortal Bond (2016), Tor Books, ISBN 978-0765336422

Ashes of the Unhewn Throne

1. The Empire's Ruin (2021), Tor Books, ISBN 978-0765389909

Other novels

- Skullsworn (2017), Tor Books, ISBN 978-0765389879
