= Upright Women Wanted =

2020 Western LGBT novella by Sarah Gailey

- Author: Sarah Gailey
- Language: English
- Genre: Western fiction; Dystopian fiction
- Set in: American Southwest
- Publisher: Tor.com
- Publication date: February 4, 2020
- Publication place: United States
- Pages: 176 (hardcover)
- ISBN: 1250213584

Upright Women Wanted is a 2020 Western LGBT novella by Sarah Gailey, their third published novella. In the novella, Esther escapes from an arranged marriage after her lover Beatriz is executed. She joins the Librarians, a group of women who distribute government propaganda to rural settlements, and finds that they are more than they seem. The work was nominated for the 2020 Hugo Award for Best Novella and 2020 Locus Award for Best Novella.

== Plot ==
After her lover Beatriz is executed for the possession of Unapproved Materials, Esther flees an arranged marriage and stows away in the wagon of a group of Librarians. The Librarians distribute Approved Materials to rural settlements, but Esther soon learns that her group of Librarians is a front for an anti-censorship resistance group. She learns that Bet and Leda, two of the Librarians, are a lesbian couple; Esther confronts her own internalized homophobia. The Librarians agree to transport three women to a sanctuary in Utah. They are attacked by a sheriff's posse, and Esther learns that one of the women, Amity, is wanted for murder.

Esther falls in love with Cye, a non-binary Librarian who must pretend to be female in order to survive in the State. Esther and Cye deliver Amity safely. Bet and Leda retire; Esther and Cye take their place.

== Major themes ==
The story takes place in a future United States in which the government has devolved and now resembles the Old West. The futuristic setting is used to reflect the modern-day issues of homophobia, fascism, and post-truth society when taken to their logical extremes.

After the collapse of society, America devolves into white and male supremacy. This reflects one possible end to the current American trends of income inequality, misogyny, and homophobia. The male characters are almost exclusively villains, while queer female and non-binary characters are shown in a positive light. The story uses Esther's character arc as a means to explore sexual liberation and domestic violence. Esther's relationship with Beatriz and her initial reason for joining the Librarians are used to explore internalized homophobia.

== Reception ==
The novella received positive critical reviews. A reviewer for NPR called it "lively, exquisitely crafted, and unrelentingly fun". Publishers Weekly gave the novella a starred review, praising the "gorgeous writing and authentic characters". Reviews have praised the novella for blending the Western genre with modern social commentary. Writing for Locus Magazine, author Liz Bourke praised the concept, characterization, and writing style, while criticizing the novella's brevity and price.

It was nominated for the 2021 Hugo Award for Best Novella and the 2021 Locus Award for Best Novella.
