= Magic for Liars =

2019 fantasy and mystery novel by Sarah Gailey

- First edition
- Author: Sarah Gailey
- Cover artist: Will Staehle
- Language: English
- Genre: Fantasy; Murder mystery
- Publisher: Tor Books
- Publication date: June 4, 2019
- Publication place: United States
- ISBN: 978-1250-17461-1

Magic for Liars is a 2019 murder mystery/fantasy novel, by Sarah Gailey. It was first published by Tor Books.

== Synopsis ==
When a faculty member dies under suspicious circumstances at Osthorne Academy for Young Mages, authorities rule that it was an accident. The headmaster wants a second opinion, and hires a private investigator — Ivy Gamble, the nonmagical estranged sister of Osthorne teacher Tabitha Gamble — to find out what really happened.

== Reception ==
Kirkus Reviews considered it to be "a poignant and bittersweet family tragedy disguised as a mystery", albeit with "thin worldbuilding". Publishers Weekly called it a "wonderfully quirky mystery filled with inviting characters and gripping surprise twists", but noted that Ivy was "petty, petulant (and) hard to like". At BoingBoing, Cory Doctorow said it was a "first-rate whodunnit" and a "superb debut".

The Verge found Ivy to be "a far more relatable character than most other magical detectives", and lauded Gailey's worldbuilding as "clearly establish(ing) a much larger world," emphasizing that Osthorne "more than nearly any other magical institution, feels like a high school."

National Public Radio praised Gailey's choice to "sidestep" the "fantasy author's challenge" of explaining "how magic works" by leaving the topic beyond Ivy's comprehension, but questioned whether the book "really works as a crime novel" instead of as an "emotional novel with magic", and expressed concern that the school secretary Mrs. Webb — "the only specifically African American character on the staff" — is "a source of scalpel-sharp insight and unexpected power, whose portrayal skates perilously close to magical stereotype".

Locus described it as "a story about the lines between truth and lies and about the legacy of bitterness", in which Ivy is a "compelling narrator" whose "voice (...) carries the action well", despite "some of the twists (being) too well telegraphed."

The A.V. Club was less positive, particularly faulting the portrayals of students Dylan and Alexandria as lacking "the development needed to make them feel like anything more than moving pieces of the plot", and comparing Ivy's interactions with faculty member Rahul to a "rom-com plot" that is "almost entirely disconnected from the rest of the story", ultimately concluding that despite being a "lovely look at sibling rivalry", the book "feels so close to being magical, but never finds a way to achieve its full power".

Magic for Liars was a finalist for the Locus Award for Best First Novel.
