= The Echo Wife =

2021 science fiction thriller novel by Sarah Gailey

- Author: Sarah Gailey
- Cover artist: Will Staehle
- Language: English
- Genre: Science fiction, thriller
- Publisher: Tor Books
- Publication date: February 16, 2021
- Publication place: United States
- Media type: Hardcover
- Pages: 256 (1st ed hardcover)
- ISBN: 9781250174666 (1st ed hardcover)
- OCLC: 1196822739
- Dewey Decimal: 813.6
- LC Class: PS3607.A35943

The Echo Wife is a 2021 science fiction thriller novel by Sarah Gailey, published by Tor Books. It follows Doctor Evelyn Caldwell, an accomplished scientist researching cloning, who has discovered that her husband, Nathan, has used her research to create Martine, a clone of Evelyn who is his ideal wife. When Martine kills Nathan in self-defense, Evelyn must assist in covering up the murder.

== Plot ==
Evelyn Caldwell receives a call from Martine, an identical clone of her created by her husband, Nathan. Nathan cheated on Evelyn with Martine and divorced her soon after. Martine reveals to Evelyn that she is pregnant; Evelyn blames Martine for taking the life she deserved from her. Later, Martine asks Evelyn to come over and ushers her into their house, where she reveals Nathan's dead body, having stabbed him to death with a kitchen knife. Evelyn reluctantly helps Martine bury his corpse and use his DNA to create an identical clone of him to help Martine to take care of their child, although they wipe his memories and make it seem that Martine is Evelyn; they also install a kill switch just in case.

Some time later, Martine calls Evelyn over again and reveals that while digging in the back yard, she discovered the bodies of 12 copies of her; Evelyn realizes that Martine was Nathan's 13th clone and the first success, having murdered the other copies and buried them. Martine aims to use Nathan's clone's kill switch but Evelyn convinces her to use the 12th corpse to fake her death, leaving their child with Nathan before leaving.

== Film adaptation ==
On March 4, 2021, Annapurna Pictures optioned the film adaptation rights to the novel with its author Sarah Gailey on board as an executive producer.

== Reception ==
Entertainment Weekly released the first excerpt of The Echo Wife in May 2020. David Canfield called the novel "a trippy domestic thriller which takes the extramarital affair trope in some intriguingly weird new directions."

Foz Meadows said of novel, "Sharply written, disturbing and thought-provoking, The Echo Wife is the kind of book that lingers with you long after you’ve finished reading it."

In a review for Locus, Gary K. Wolfe wrote that "the novel may not offer much that is new, but as a portrait of a character forced to literally confront herself for almost the first time, it’s pretty compelling," and Adrienne Martini wrote that the characters "[make] for a fine allegory but decidedly less satisfying fiction."

In a review for NPR, Jason Heller wrote that "In the book's treatment of cloning, gender dynamics, moral ambiguity, and the lofty idea of the existential nature of identity, it has a passing resemblance to some great contemporary television, including Killing Eve, Orphan Black, Black Mirror, and Westworld..."

Year	Award	Category	Result	Ref
2021	Goodreads Choice Award	Best Science Fiction	Nominated	
