= The Forgetting Moon =

2016 novel by Brian Lee Durfee

- Author: Brian Lee Durfee
- Audio read by: Tim Gerard Reynolds
- Cover artist: Richard Anderson
- Language: English
- Series: The Five Warrior Angels
- Release number: 1
- Genre: Epic fantasy, grimdark
- Publisher: Saga Press
- Publication date: August 30, 2016
- Media type: hardcover
- Pages: 777
- ISBN: 978-1-4814-6522-9
- Followed by: The Blackest Heart
- Website: Official website

The Forgetting Moon is a 2016 grimdark epic fantasy novel by Brian Lee Durfee, published through Saga Press.

== Plot ==
A young boy, Nail, is orphaned and subsequently raised by a retired warrior named Shawcroft. Unbeknownst to him, he is part of a much larger plot that involves war and power struggles across the Five Isles.

== Publication ==
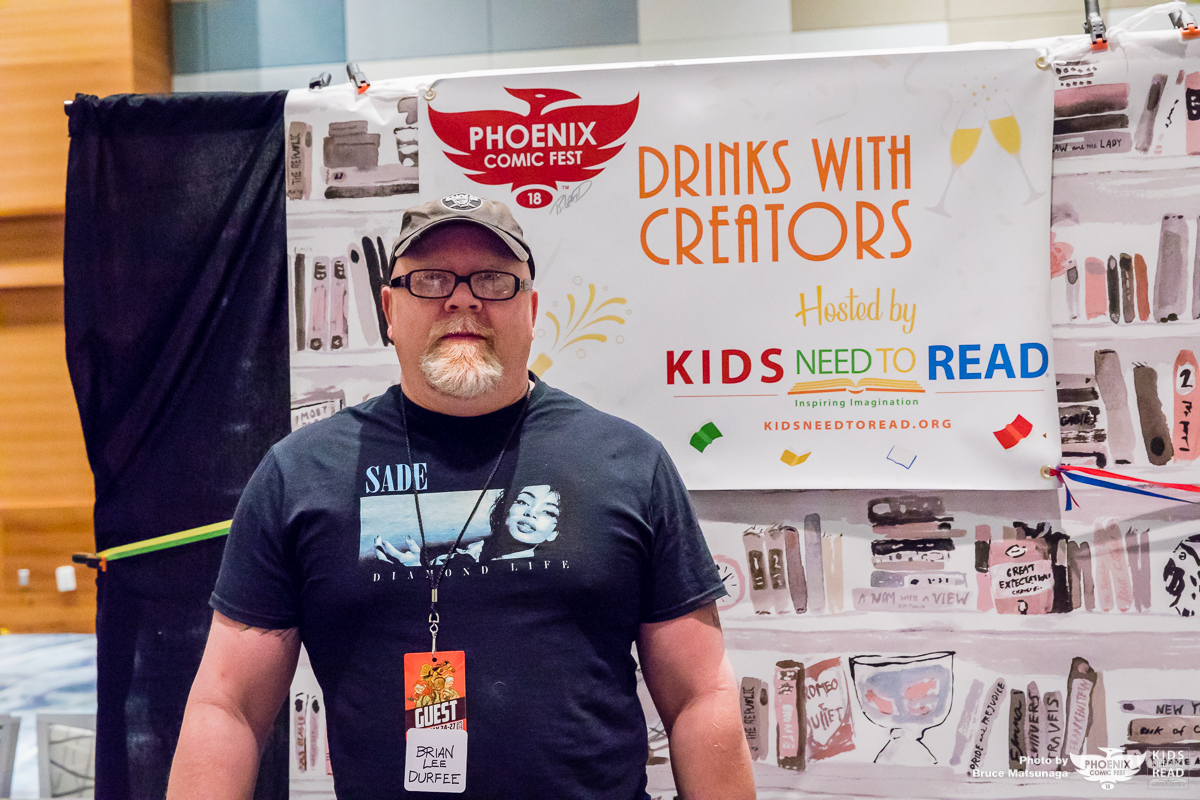
Author Brian Lee Durfee at Phoenix Comic Fest in 2018

The Forgetting Moon was published in hardcover and ebook formats on 30 August 2016 through Saga Press, an imprint of Simon & Schuster. Saga released a trade paperback edition on 29 August 2017. Recorded Books released an audiobook narrated by Tim Gerard Reynolds on 30 January 2019. The cover artist for the North American editions was Richard Anderson.

Klett-Cotta released a German language edition on 10 March 2018 under the title Der Mond des Vergessens.

== Reception ==
Paul Di Filippo, in his review for Locus Online, described The Forgetting Moon as "[providing] plenty of well-crafted spectacle, thrills, suspense, blood, thunder and [a] general sense of wonder." He continued, stating that Durfee included "no waste or overstuffing", further describing the story as "enthralling". The story is squarely in the grimdark genre and "not for those who would rather spend the day dreaming in Rivendell."

On Barnes & Noble's science fiction and fantasy blog, Jeff Somers describes the story as "epic fantasy turned up to eleven", pointing out that "Durfee doesn’t shy away from darkness" in this grimdark fantasy tale. Even though Durfee uses many common epic fantasy tropes, he puts his own mark on them.

The Forgetting Moon was compared favorably to A Song of Ice and Fire by George R. R. Martin by SFFWorld, noting the similarly dark themes and the epic fantasy elements. The cover art by Richard Anderson was also praised, stating "it could easily be the cover of a heavy metal album."
