= River of Teeth =

2017 alternate history novella by Sarah Gailey

- Author: Sarah Gailey
- Cover artist: Richard Anderson
- Language: English
- Series: River of Teeth #1
- Genre: Alternate history, Historical fiction, Western fiction
- Publisher: Tor Books
- Publication date: May 23, 2017
- Publication place: United States
- Pages: 175
- ISBN: 978-0-7653-9523-8 (1st paperback edition)
- OCLC: 987435695
- Dewey Decimal: 813/.6
- LC Class: PS3607.A35943 R58 2017
- Followed by: Taste of Marrow

River of Teeth is a 2017 alternate history novella by Sarah Gailey, first published by Tor Books with cover art by Richard Anderson.

== Synopsis ==
As one of his last acts of his presidency in early 1861, President James Buchanan approved the Hippo Act, a plan to import hippopotamuses into the United States as livestock. Decades later, the lawless swamps of Louisiana are infested with murderous feral hippos, and Winslow Houndstooth and his band of misfits are hired to clear them out.

== Reception ==
River of Teeth was a finalist for the 2017 Nebula Award for Best Novella and 2018 Hugo Award for Best Novella.

Kirkus Reviews considered it to be "delightful" and "fun and charming", comparing it to Ocean's Eleven, but faulted it for having some "awkward transitions". Publishers Weekly called it "intricate", with a "tight pace" and "complex relationships" between characters, commending Gailey's exposition.

Writing for NPR, Amal El-Mohtar praised Gailey's worldbuilding, but felt that the "characters [were] somewhat ill-served at novella length". At Strange Horizons, Samira Nadkarni emphasized that the story was "fun" and "action-adventure escapism", lauding the portrayal of a romance between bisexual Houndstooth and nonbinary Hero Shackleby; however, Nadkarni also criticized the focus on single aspects of the intersectional characters' identities, and observed that Gailey omitted entire indigenous populations who historically would have lived in that part of Louisiana.

== Background ==
The story is inspired by Louisiana Congressman Robert F. Broussard's 1910 plan to import hippopotamuses to America, with the intent that they would eat invasive water hyacinth and serve as meat animals. In regards to the "very little discrimination" which the characters encounter, Gailey has admitted that the worldbuilding involves "judicious handwaving", in that "if someone were to extrapolate the history of the world that had to develop in order for this story to happen, they'd probably need to cut out a lot of slavery and colonialism and Western Imperialism from America's history."

== Sequel ==
In October 2017, Tor Books released Taste of Marrow, which follows the characters of River of Teeth in the months following the events of that book.
