= Echopraxia (novel) =

2014 science fiction novel by Peter Watts

- Author: Peter Watts
- Cover artist: Richard Anderson
- Language: English
- Series: Firefall
- Genre: Science fiction
- Publisher: Tor Books
- Publication date: 2014
- Publication place: Canada
- Media type: Print (hardback)
- Pages: 383
- ISBN: 978-0765328038
- OCLC: 858730761
- LC Class: PR9199.3.W386 E24 2014
- Preceded by: Blindsight

Echopraxia is a hard science fiction novel by Canadian writer Peter Watts. It is a "sidequel" to his 2006 novel, Blindsight, and the two novels make up the Firefall series.

Echopraxia follows the story of a biologist who gets caught up in a voyage into the heart of the Solar System among members of a transcendentalist monastic order and allies (including a vampire escaped from a research facility and her cadre of zombified soldiers) to investigate a mysterious signal seemingly coming from the mission sent to initiate first contact in Watts' previous novel.

The title refers to a psychological condition in which a person involuntarily mimics actions they observe.

== Synopsis ==
The story, set on the eve of the twenty-second century, follows a parasitologist named Daniel Brüks, who accidentally finds himself trapped within a conflict involving several trans-human groups. Forced to escape into space, he boards the starship Crown Of Thorns, together with a varied crew that includes Valerie, a vampire; Lianna Lutterodt, a monastic apprentice; Jim Moore, a soldier; Rakshi Sengupta, the pilot; and the Bicamerals, a group of trans-humans able to share thoughts and brainpower without the need for verbal communication. They journey together towards the Icarus station, which captures energy from the Sun and uses it to power both Earth and the Theseus ship, currently on a mission to contact an extraterrestrial entity. Things change abruptly when they find in the station signs of an alien intelligence that the crew names Portia, based on the extraordinary intelligence that the spider of the same name showcases, despite its small brain.

During the trip, several secondary plot points are explored: the relationship between Brüks and his ex-wife, Rho, who decided to ascend to "Heaven", a custom virtual reality world for people who don't want to go on with their ordinary lives; the relationship between Jim Moore and his son, Siri Keeton, who travelled on the Theseus several years ago; Sengupta's search for the man who caused her wife's death; and Valerie's escape from the neurological chains that her human creators had imposed on her.

== Themes ==
Echopraxia explores topics like the nature of consciousness and the actual need (or lack) for it in evolved creatures, the use of religion to advance knowledge beyond science, the existence of God as a virus that modifies the laws of physics, and the role that baseline (non-modified) humans can have in a society where everyone else is "augmented" in one way or another.

Watts ends the book with an essay explaining how the scientific and philosophical themes of the novel are grounded in the academic literature. He dismisses the idea that humans have free will as a "farce" unworthy of serious debate. "I don't have much to say about it because the arguments seem so clear-cut as to be almost uninteresting. Neurons do not fire themselves. [...] The switch cannot flip itself. QED."

== Reception ==
Steven Shaviro of the Los Angeles Review of Books wrote positively of the book: "Peter Watts' new novel Echopraxia is science fiction on steroids — or better, on some intensely mind-bending and energizing drug that hasn't been invented yet." Alyx Dellamonica of Reactor praised Watts for the development of his writing style: "Every word has been tuned and polished: there's a perfectionism at work here, a refusal to write a novel that's merely as good as the last one if something better can be wrung from cutting edge science and the English language." Matt Hilliard of Strange Horizons called Echopraxia "a rewarding book for fans of hard science fiction" but compared the novel unfavourably to Blindsight: "Echopraxia has a less sympathetic protagonist, a less interesting crew, and a much smaller part for the still delightful and menacing aliens. [...] Unfortunately, it feels very much overshadowed by its Hugo-nominated predecessor."

== Adaptation ==
In July 2026, Neill Blomkamp released an AI-generated short-film called Nightborne on YouTube, which was adapted from Echopraxia. In 2025, he was set to adapt Blindsight into a feature film.
