= Brian Lee Durfee =

American painter and writer

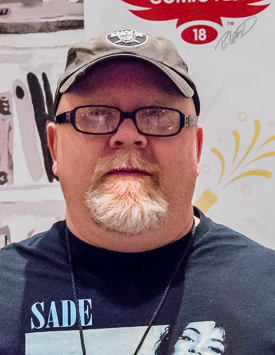
- Durfee at Phoenix Comic Fest (2018)
- Education: Brigham Young University
- Occupations: Artist; Writer
- Writing career
- Pen name: Brian D. Lee
- Language: English
- Years active: 1994–current
- Genres: Fantasy; Grimdark; Horror
- Notable works: The Forgetting Moon (novel); "Grand Canyon Cliffs–Peregrine Falcons" (painting)
- Notable awards: Illustrators of the Future (1992); Grand Canyon Purchase Award (1999)
- Website: brianleedurfee.weebly.com

Brian Lee Durfee is an American wildlife, landscape, and fantasy painter, and a fantasy and horror writer. His paintings have appeared in various genre and other magazines, games, and books. One of his wildlife paintings is in the permanent collection at the Grand Canyon National Park visitors center.

Saga Press published his epic grimdark fantasy series, beginning with The Forgetting Moon. He also has a horror alternate history series.

== Biography ==
Durfee grew up in Fairbanks, Alaska and Monroe, Utah. He played high school football, then served a mission for the Church of Jesus Christ of Latter-day Saints in Connecticut, though he is no longer a practicing member of that church. He graduated from Brigham Young University with a degree in illustration and fine arts.

In 1992, he won second place in the second quarter Illustrators of the Future contest and was chosen to illustrate "The Monitor" by John Richard DeRose and "Lady's Portrait, Executed in Archaic Colors" by Charles M. Saplak in Writers of the Future, Volume IX. He was a member of the Society of Illustrators in New York. Durfee cites works by Robert Jordan, Stephen King, George R. R. Martin, Larry McMurtry, Mötley Crüe, the Oakland Raiders, and Tad Williams as being influential on his life and his works.

His oil painting, "Grand Canyon Cliffs–Peregrine Falcons", won the 1999 Bird Award of Merit and the Grand Canyon National Park Association Purchase Award. One of his paintings is in the permanent collection at the Kolb Gallery at the visitors center at Grand Canyon National Park. He was the artist guest of honor at CONduit 10 in 2000.

Durfee works as a prison guard at the Utah State Prison, where he has worked in the mental health unit, the gang unit, processing new inmates, and overseeing the six libraries within the prison. He initially got the job because he wanted to be a police officer, but then decided to stay in that job. He worked with author James Dashner to put on a convention for the inmates at the prison, and he has taught creative writing classes to some of the inmates.

== Bibliography ==
=== The Five Warrior Angels ===
An epic grimdark fantasy series.

- The Forgetting Moon (August 2016, Saga Press, ISBN 978-1-4814-6522-9)
- The Blackest Heart (February 2019, Saga Press, ISBN 978-1-4814-6525-0)
- The Lonesome Crown (November 2022, Saga Press, ISBN 978-1-4814-6528-1)

=== South Severe ===
An alternate history horror series set in a small, rural town, published under the pseudonym "Brian D. Lee".

- South Severe (December 2011, B.Lee.D Books, ISBN 978-1-4663-8417-0)
- Bedlam Blues (December 2011, B.Lee.D Books, ISBN 978-1-4680-0890-6)

=== As artist ===
==== Cover art ====
- The Leading Edge edited by Alex Grover (issue 32, February 1996, Brigham Young University)
- Adventures of Sword and Sorcery, Spring 1996 issue edited by Randy Dannenfelser
- Adventures of Sword and Sorcery, Issue 3, 1996 edited by Randy Dannenfelser
- Pirate Writings edited by Edward J. McFadden (issue 14, 1997)
- Dragon Magazine (issue 239, September 1997)

==== Interior art ====
- "The Froglover" in Tomorrow Speculative Fiction edited by Algis Budrys (February 1994)
- "Planned Obsolescence" in Tomorrow Speculative Fiction edited by Algis Budrys (April 1994)
- "Character Creation" in Spectrum III: The Best in Contemporary Fantastic Art (as Brian Durfee) (1996, Underwood Books, ISBN 1-887424-10-5)

==== Collectible card games ====
Durfee illustrated several cards for Magic: The Gathering collectible card game, including four mountain cards, "Blossoming Wreath", and "Sylvan Hierophant". He also illustrated three cards for the Middle-earth Collectible Card Game: "Black Númenóreans", "Returned Exiles", and "Hey, come merry dol!".

==== Wildlife and landscape works ====
- "The Bear" (1998, oil)
- "Red Tailed Hawk" (1998, oil)
- "Grand Canyon Cliffs–Peregrine Falcons" (1999, oil)

== Awards and honors ==
Year	Organization	Award title, Category	Work	Result	Refs
1992	Bridge Publications	Illustrators of the Future, Second Quarter	–	2	
1998	Sevier County, Utah	Sevier County Commissioners' Art Show	"The Bear"	1	
1999	Arts for the Parks	Bird Award of Merit, and Grand Canyon Purchase Award	"Grand Canyon Cliffs–Peregrine Falcons"	Won	
