= Sarah Gailey =

American author

- Gailey at Rose City Comic Con in 2026
- Born: California
- Occupation: Author
- Writing career
- Language: English
- Genres: Fantasy, science fiction, horror fiction
- Notable works: River of Teeth; Magic for Liars
- Notable awards: British Fantasy Award for Best Horror Novel; Hugo Award for Best Fan Writer
- Website: sarahgailey.com

Sarah Gailey is an American author of fantasy, science fiction, and mystery novels, short stories, and comics.

As a comics writer, they have published Eat the Rich (2021); an arc in the Buffy the Vampire Slayer universe, The Vampire Slayer (2022–2023); and another original, Know Your Station (2022–2023).

Perhaps best known for their American Hippo duology, the alternate history novella River of Teeth (2017) was a finalist for the 2017 Nebula Award for Best Novella, the 2018 Hugo Award for Best Novella, and the 2018 Locus Award for Best Novella. A follow-up, Taste of Marrow, was shortly released thereafter, with an omnibus published the year next.

Their full-length novels include award-nominated Magic for Liars (2019), The Echo Wife (2021) and Just Like Home (2022).

== Career ==
Gailey's fiction has been published in The Atlantic, Tor.com, and Fireside Magazine. Their non-fiction writing has appeared on Tor.com, Mashable, The Boston Globe and Uncanny Magazine.

According to Gailey's website, their work has been translated into seven different languages.

=== Novels and other work ===
Gailey first became well known for their 2017 American Hippo duology, consisting of the novellas River of Teeth and Taste of Marrow. The pair of alternate history novellas center upon the hypothetical import of hippos into southern US bayou country as food stock and as a counteractive measure against invasive water hyacinth, inspired by the real House Resolution 23261 (1910). The "alternate" in these alt-history novellas rests upon the idea that Louisiana Congressman Robert F. Broussard's bill did not fail; instead, it was passed by Congress and signed into law by President Buchanan during his lame duck period in 1861. Years later, an extermination group is hired to eliminate feral hippos that have killed locals. Multiple main characters are LGBTQ, including non-binary individuals, and reviewers have discussed the complexity of their interactions. Well-received for its characters, creative worldbuilding, and fast-paced action by critics, the duology received minor criticism for its novella format, structural length, transitions, and missed opportunities for accurate depiction of indigenous populations.

Upright Woman Wanted, a standalone novella published in February 2020, depicts a future American Southwest where queer librarians travel on horseback, spying on a fascist state on behalf of a resistance group.

Their first full-length novel, Magic for Liars, was published by Tor Books in June 2019. Magic for Liars adds crime and mystery to Gailey's fantasy writing; the novel notably contains a non-exposited magic system, unusual in the genre. BuzzFeed News called it "one of the best fantasies of 2019."

Their debut young adult novel, When We Were Magic, was published by Simon Pulse in March 2020. When a boy ends up dead after a magical accident happens on prom night, the main character, Alexis, and her group of close-knit friends try to right the terrible wrong. However, they fail and must find a way to live with themselves afterwards.

Gailey's second novel for adults, The Echo Wife, is a science fiction thriller about an award-winning geneticist, Dr. Evelyn Caldwell, whose husband, Nathan, leaves her for her clone. It was published in February 2021 by Tor Books.

In July 2022, Gailey released their third novel for adults, Just Like Home. Published by Tor Books, Just Like Home is a gothic thriller about monsters, secrets, and children's love for their parents.

Gailey's most recent novella, Spread Me, was published in September 2025 by Tor Books on its Nightfire imprint. It was notable for its depictions of body horror and explorations of transgressive sexuality.

=== Comics ===
In August 2021, their five-issue original comics series Eat the Rich premiered. They continued their work in comics with a 12-issue Buffy the Vampire Slayer comics arc titled The Vampire Slayer (2022–2023) and an original science fiction series titled Know Your Station (2022–2023), co-created with artist Liana Kangas.

They've also done work with Marvel Comics with stories published in Crypt of Shadows #1 (2023), Werewolf by Night: Unholy Alliance (2024), and Predator Black, White & Blood #1 (2025) and full runs on both White Widow (2023) and Avengers United #54–63 (2024).

== Personal life ==
Gailey grew up in Fremont, California and lives in Northern California.

Gailey is non-binary.

== Awards and nominations ==
Year	Work	Award	Category	Result	Ref.
2017	—	John W. Campbell Award for Best New Writer	—	Shortlisted	
2017	"The Women of Harry Potter" posts	British Fantasy Award	Non-fiction	Shortlisted	
2017	"The Women of Harry Potter" posts	Hugo Award	Related Work	Finalist	
2017	River of Teeth	Nebula Award	Novella	Nominated	
2018	River of Teeth	Hugo Award	Novella	Finalist	
2018	River of Teeth	Locus Award	Novella	Finalist	
2018	—N/a	Hugo Award	Fan Writer	Won	
2019	"STET"	Hugo Award	Short Story	Finalist	
2019	"STET"	Locus Award	Short Story	Finalist	
2019	American Hippo	Gaylactic Spectrum Awards	Novel	Nominated	
2020	"Away With the Wolves"	Hugo Award	Novelette	Finalist	
2020	Magic for Liars	Locus Award	First Novel	Finalist	
2021	Upright Women Wanted	Hugo Award	Novella	Finalist	
2021	Upright Women Wanted	Locus Award	Novella	Finalist	
2022	Upright Women Wanted	Ignotus Award	Foreign Novella	Won	
2022	The Echo Wife	Locus Award	Novel	Finalist	
2023	Just Like Home	British Fantasy Award	Horror Novel (August Derleth Award)	Won	
2023	Just Like Home	Locus Award	Novel	Nominated	
2023	Eat the Rich	Bram Stoker Award	Graphic Novel	Nominated	
2024	Stone Soup: Personal Canons Cookbook	Ignyte Awards	The Community Award	Nominated	
2026	Spread Me	Locus Award	Horror Novel	Finalist	

== Bibliography ==
=== Novels ===
- —— (2019). Magic for Liars. Tor Books. ISBN 9781250174611.
- —— (2020). When We Were Magic. Simon Pulse. ISBN 9781534432871.
- —— (2021). The Echo Wife. Tor Books. ISBN 9781250174666.
- —— (2022). Just Like Home. Tor Books. ISBN 9781250174727.
- —— (2026). Make Me Better. Tor Books. ISBN 9781250851758.

=== Comics collections ===
- —— (2022). Eat the Rich. BOOM! Studios. ISBN 9781684158324.
- —— (2023). The Vampire Slayer, Vol. 1. BOOM! Studios. ISBN 9781684158843.
- —— (2023). The Vampire Slayer, Vol. 2. BOOM! Studios. ISBN 9781684158935.
- —— (2023). The Vampire Slayer, Vol. 3. BOOM! Studios. ISBN 9781684159147.
- —— (2023). Know Your Station. BOOM! Studios. ISBN 9781684159963.
- —— (2024). White Widow: Welcome to Idylhaveven. Marvel Comics. ISBN 9781302957322.

=== American Hippo novella series ===
- —— (2017). River of Teeth. Tor Books. ISBN 9780765395221.
- —— (2017). Taste of Marrow. Tor Books. ISBN 9780765395245.

==== Omnibus ====
Contains the novellas River of Teeth and Taste of Marrow, as well as additional short stories, including "Worth Her Weight in Gold"

- —— (2018). American Hippo. Tor Books. ISBN 9781250176424.

=== Other novellas ===
- —— (2017). The Fisher of Bones. Fireside Fiction. ISBN 9780998778327.
- —— (2020). Upright Women Wanted. Tor Books. ISBN 9781250213587.
- —— (2025). Spread Me. Tor Books. ISBN 9781250387332.

=== Short stories ===
Year	Title	Publication
2015	"Stars"	—— (Autumn 2015). "Stars". The Colored Lens (17).
2015	"Bargain"	—— (October 2015). "Bargain". Mothership Zeta. 1 (1). Escape Artists, Inc.
2015	"Look"	—— (June 2015). "Look". Cease, Cows Magazine.
2015	"The Breakup"	——(August 2015). Literary Hatchet.
2015	"Under Advisement of the Moon"	——(September 2015). Beyond the Imagination.
2016	"Whisper"	——(January 2016) Speculative Bookshop Anthology.
2016	"Haunted"	—— (March 2016). "Haunted". Fireside Magazine (31). Archived from the original on July 3, 2019.
2016	"Of Blood and Bronze"	—— (August 2016). "Of Blood and Bronze". Devilfish Review (17).
2016	"Homesick"	—— (September 2016). "Homesick". Fireside Magazine (36). Archived from the original on July 5, 2022.
2016	"Rescue"	—— (October 2016). "Rescue". Mothership Zeta. 1 (5). Escape Artists, Inc.
2017	"The Chisel"	——(February 2017). "The Chisel". Wizards In Space Literary Magazine.
2017	"The Art of Asterculture"	—— (May 10, 2017). "The Art of Asterculture". Tor.com. Archived from the original on July 3, 2019.
2017	"A Lady's Maid"	—— (May 2017). "A Lady's Maid". Barnes & Noble. Archived from the original on July 3, 2019.
2017	"Single Parent"	—— (June 2017). "Single Parent". Cast of Wonders (253). Escape Artists, Inc.
2017	"The Fisher of Bones"	—— (August–December 2017). "The Fisher of Bones". Fireside Magazine (46–51). Archived from the original on November 28, 2021.
2018	"STET"	—— (October 2018). "STET". Fireside Magazine (60). Archived from the original on April 4, 2019.
2018	"Bread and Milk and Salt"	—— (November 7, 2018). "Bread and Milk and Salt". Tor.com.
2018	"From the Void"	—— (November 2018). "From the Void". Shimmer (46).
2018	"Anonymous Croupier"	—— (February 2018). Anonymous Croupier". Stone Soup.
2018	"The Nightmare Stays the Same"	—— (March 2018). "The Nightmare Stays the Same". Stone Soup.
2018	"Our Collection"	—— (March 2018). "Our Collection". Stone Soup.
2018	"Go Home, Go Home, Go Home"	—— (April 2018). "Go Home, Go Home, Go Home". Stone Soup.
2018	"The Legend of Tania and Lula"	—— (April 2018). "The Legend of Tania and Lula". Stone Soup.
2018	"Worth Her Weight in Gold"	——(May 2018). "Worth Her Weight In Gold". Tor.com.
2018	"What Grew"	——(June 2018). "What Grew". Uncanny Magazine.
2018	"As Simple As Vanishing"	—— (June 2018). "As Simple As Vanishing". Stone Soup.
2018	"Anne and the Stairs"	—— (July 2018). "Anne and the Stairs". Stone Soup.
2018	"An Introduction to Pain"	—— (August 2018). "An Introduction to Pain". Stone Soup.
2018	"All the Stars Above the Sea"	——(September/October 2018). "All the Stars Above the Sea". Uncanny Magazine.
2018	"There Are No Hands in the River"	—— (October 2018). "There Are No Hands in the River". Stone Soup.
2018	"The Catch"	—— (October 2018). "The Catch". Stone Soup.
2018	"An Augmented Reality"	—— (December 2018). "An Augmented Reality". The Atlantic.
2019	"Away With the Wolves"	—— (September 2019). "Away With the Wolves". Uncanny. Archived from the original on August 2, 2020.
2019	"Wild to Covet"	—— (September 2019). "Wild to Covet". The Mythic Dream. Saga Press.
2019	"The Thing That Hides In Your Home"	——(March 2019). "The Thing That Hides In Your Home". Stone Soup.
2019	"Reynard Is Coming"	——(January 2019). "Reynard Is Coming". Stone Soup.
2020	"Drones to Ploughshares"	—— (February 4, 2020). "Drones to Ploughshares". Vice. Archived from the original on December 12, 2024.
2020	"We Don't Talk About the Dragon"	—— (June 2020). "We Don't Talk About the Dragon". The Book of Dragons. HarperVoyager.
2020	"At the Threshold of Your Bedchamber on the Fifth Night"	—— (July 2020). "At the Threshold of Your Bedchamber on the Fifth Night". Subterranean: Tales of Dark Fantasy 3. Subterranean Press.
2020	"Tiger Lawyer Gets It Right"	—— (October 2020). "Tiger Lawyer Gets It Right". Escape Pod. Titan Books.
2021	"I Swim Up From Below"	—— (September 2021). "I Swim Up From Below". Mermaids Monthly (9).
2022	"I Remember Satellites"	—— (May 2022). "I Remember Satellites". Someone in Time. Solaris.
2022	"The Daily Commute"	——(July 2022). "The Daily Commute". The Sunday Morning Transport.
2022	"When The Tide Rises"	——(August 2022). "When The Tide Rises". Tomorrow's Parties: Life in the Anthropocene
2024	"Have You Eaten?"	——(September 2024). "Have You Eaten?" Reactor Magazine.

=== Select nonfiction ===
- "This Future Looks Familiar: Watching Blade Runner in 2017". Tor.com. October 2017.
- "Impostor/Abuser: Power Dynamics in Publishing". Fireside Magazine. March 2019.
