= Kings of the Wyld =

Fantasy novel by Nicholas Eames

- Author: Nicholas Eames
- Language: English
- Series: The Band
- Genres: Fantasy
- Published: February 21, 2017
- Publisher: Orbit
- Publication place: Canada
- Pages: 422
- Awards: 2018 David Gemmell Morningstar Award; 2017 r/Fantasy Stabby Award for "Best Debut Novel of 2017"
- ISBN: 0-356-50902-8
- OCLC: 1028458680
- Followed by: Bloody Rose
- Website: nicholaseames.com

Kings of the Wyld is a 2017 fantasy novel by Nicholas Eames. It is the first in the trilogy, The Band. The book is about a retired band of mercenaries that come out of retirement to save the daughter of one member.

== Background ==
The novel is Nicholas Eames's debut novel. It is the first of three books in The Band trilogy. The series includes Kings of the Wyld, Bloody Rose, and Outlaw Empire. The artwork for the books was created by Richard Anderson, and the cover design was done by Lisa Marie Pompilio.

== Synopsis ==
The story follows a band of mercenaries called Saga. The characters are likened to rock stars. The group includes Clay "Slowhand" Cooper, "Golden" Gabe, Ganelon, Matrick Skulldrummer, and Arcandius Moog. The characters have all grown old and out-of-shape after decades of living in retirement, but they emerge from retirement to save Gabe's daughter, Rose, who is trapped in a city under siege.

=== Plot ===
Set in a world where mercenary groups (or "bands") are akin to rock stars and rock bands, Clay "Slowhand" Cooper (nicknamed as such due to commonly getting hit first in every fight) lives a quiet life in Coverdale as a watchman with his wife, Ginny, and his young daughter Tally (short for Talia). One day he finds his former bandmate and best friend Gabriel on his doorstep, and Gabriel tells him he came to get Clay's help in getting their former band, Saga, back together in order to rescue Gabe's daughter Rose, who joined a band and is now trapped in Castia, a faraway city surrounded by monsters and about to be besieged. While Clay initially refuses to accompany Gabriel, Tally convinces him to go.

After setting out, Clay visits his mother's grave, and he and Gabriel both get robbed by a group of bandits led by the affable Lady Jain, who allows them to keep Clay's shield, Blackheart. They arrive in the Free City of Canthas and meet up with Kallorek, their old booker, who has since expanded his operations. Kallorek is in possession of Vellichor, Gabe's fabled artifact sword, but refuses to relinquish it and pursues Clay and Gabriel when they go to get Arcandius Moog, Saga's main mage. They use Moog's portal mirror to escape and end up in the palace bedchamber, where they find Matrick Skulldrummer, the Band's former rogue and now king. They attend the Company of Kings, a gathering of monarchs from across the country, and encounter Lastleaf, the druin son of Vespian, Master of the Heartwyld Horde about to besiege Castia, and Saga's archenemy. The assembled monarchs attempt to get Lastleaf to disband the horde, but Lastleaf refuses and instead tells them not to interfere. Matrick's wife Lilith doesn't want Matrick to leave the palace, fearing he will sire a true royal heir, so the Band fakes Matrick's death to continue their journey.

After encountering Lady Jain and her bandits again, who cook breakfast for them before robbing them again, Gabriel uses Moog's crystal ball to see Castia and becomes discouraged after seeing the sheer size of the Heartwyld Horde. Clay gives him words of encouragement, and they progress to Fivecourt, where Gabriel retrieves a sack of gold to bargain with Dinatra (a Gorgon noblewoman) for Ganelon, the final member of Saga, who has been petrified for nineteen years as punishment for murdering the Sultana's son and, as such, has not aged as much as the other bandmembers. As payment for freeing Ganelon, Saga is forced to fight a Chimera in an arena, and the Chimera manages to incapacitate everyone except Ganelon, who manages to kill it. The arena is destroyed in the battle, and Saga is rescued by Vanguard, another band who are old friends of theirs.

Saga decides to raid Kallorek's collection of magic items, and Gabriel takes back Vellichor, while Clay takes the Warskin (an impenetrable suit of armor) and a frigid sledgehammer he names Wraith, while Moog gets a magic food-producing wizard's hat and Matrick takes an insect-firing horn. The Band gears up, takes Kallorek hostage, and commandeers his flying ship, where they meet Kit, a posh and friendly revenant poet and storyteller previously imprisoned by Kallorek and accidentally freed by the Band, who joins Saga as their bard. Before departing, Gabriel, Moog, and Kit set out to gather supplies, while Clay and Ganelon were tasked with gathering any new information about Castia. They enter a bar where they encounter Lady Jain and her bandits again, who have now reformed and are now a band. They are cornered by Larkspur, a daeva bounty hunter hired by Lilith to find and return Matrick, and manage to escape from her with Moog's help.

They take off in their skyship and have a relatively uneventful few days. Clay throws Kallorek off the ship after Kallorek threatens Ginny and Tally, and not long after they enter the sky above the Heartwyld, a monster-infested forest filled with nightmarish creatures, deadly plants, and the Rot (an incurable wasting disease). They are ambushed by Larkspur in her own skyship, and in the ensuing fight, Larkspur manages to fly off with Matrick but is struck by lightning and plummets to the forest floor. Saga sets down to search for Matrick, and while searching, Ganelon reveals to Clay that he was fully conscious for the nineteen years he was petrified, to Clay's shock and horror. They find Matrick being tended to by a friendly witch doctor troll named Taino, as well as an amnesiac Larkspur, who displays a whole new personality named Sabbatha and has broken one of her wings. They decide to take Larkspur/Sabbatha with them and are attacked by a cannibal tribe. Ganelon kills their champion by crushing him under a tree, and the tribe makes peace. Moog discovers that the Rot can in fact be cured by Mudweed, much to his excitement and grief (Moog lost his husband Fredrick years earlier and has been grieving since). Moog leaves his magic food hat with the cannibals, and the Band also recruits Dane and Gregor, an ettin.

Saga's skyship is destroyed by Larkspur's monk thralls, so the Band treks through the Heartwyld, eventually setting camp in the ruins of a fort. They meet Shadow, another druin and a wandering trader, and Shadow tells them the story of Vespian and Lastleaf. Vespian was the ruler of the Dominion, the druin's mighty empire, and after his wife Astra died giving birth to a daughter, Vespian went mad with grief and made a sword, the Tamarat, which, upon killing a druin, would resurrect Astra. Vespian sacrificed his daughter, and Astra killed herself from grief, so Vespian sacrificed countless druins to resurrect her over and over again. Eventually, Astra gave birth to Vail, a son, who stole Tamarat from his father to break his mother's cycle of horrible rebirth. Vail eventually became Lastleaf and has spent years making deals with monsters, culminating in the Heartwyld Horde.

Moog realizes Shadow is aligned with Lastleaf, and Shadow states he wants to take back Vellichor, the sword Vespian gifted to Gabe, for Lastleaf. He distracts the bandmembers with ghostly clones of themselves but is eventually decapitated by Larkspur with his own scythe, which she takes for herself. The Band continues trekking to Castia, encountering a (previously thought to be fictional) Owlbear that they are forced to kill and adopt the twin Owlbear cubs. They debate on which path to take through the mountains, and the decision falls to Clay, who elects to take the Cold Road, a treacherous and deadly but quick pathway. Sheltering in a cave, Ganelon and Sabbatha play Tetrea (similar to Chess), while Kit shares how he died: he was executed by the Emperor of Castia for killing his phoenix while drunk long ago. Ganelon and Larkspur then sleep together.

While crossing the last stretch of the Cold Road, they are attacked by Rasks, and Gregor is killed when one slashes his throat. Sabbatha turns on the Band, revealing that she was faking her amnesia and her broken wing the whole time, and takes Matrick after cutting off Clay's hand. Clay falls down a ravine but survives, finds Dane still alive, and keeps him company in his final moments. Clay finds Matrick, who has given up hope, and is discovered and assaulted by Larkspur and her followers before Matrick, revitalized, steps in. They are both saved by Vanguard again, and Clay is healed and has his hand regrown, while Matrick gives up alcohol. They reunite with the rest of Saga and devise a plan to steal the key to a nearby portal from the dragon Akatung. Matrick is sent to steal the keystone, and they manage to evade Akatung long enough for Moog to use the portal to send the dragon to the bottom of the ocean. They then open the portal to Kaladar, in the middle of the War Fair, the biggest gathering of mercenaries. Gabriel riles the mercs and leads his new army to fight the Heartwyld Horde, and Gabriel duels Lastleaf while Clay is sidetracked by a Minotaur. Larkspur arrives, having had a change of heart, and kills two giants. Gabriel defeats Lastleaf, who flees, and the mercenaries manage to defeat the Horde. Gabriel reunites with Rose, while Clay discovers that Lastleaf stabbed himself with Tamarat, thus resurrecting Astra, the Winter Queen.

Matrick becomes the new emperor of Castia, and all of his illegitimate children choose to stay with him. Moog makes the cure for the Rot publicly available, and Ganelon chooses to go back to the Quarry, waiting for Larkspur (whom he unknowingly left with his child). Clay heads back to Coverdale and reunites with his wife and daughter.

=== Characters ===
- Gabriel "Golden Gabe": The Frontman of Saga and the one responsible for reuniting them after 20 years. Gabriel is divorced from his ex-wife Valery and has a daughter, Rose, who joined a Band to live up to Gabe's reputation and has become stuck in the city of Castia, which is under siege from the Heartwyld Horde. Gabriel's primary weapon is Vellichor, a mystic longsword given to him by Vespian, the Archon of the fallen Druin empire. Gabriel is likened to the lead singer of a band.
- Clay "Slowhand" Cooper: The viewpoint character, Clay Cooper is a large, physically imposing man but is a caring, if troubled, soul. Clay had an abusive father and is living a quiet life in a small town with his wife Ginny and daughter Tully when Gabriel comes to ask him to reunite the band. Clay's weapon is his shield, Blackheart, which he made out of a defeated treant. Clay is the undisputed leader of Saga, leading the other band members through hard roads and tough moral decisions, but Clay is rather unaware of this. Nicholas Eames has stated that Clay is based on 'That guy on bass whose name is never remembered, but without him the song just doesn't feel right.'
- Arcandius Moog: An eccentric wizard, Arcandius Moog is the Band's primary magic specialist. He is one of the small minority of people in the world who believes in the existence of the Owlbear and also seeks a cure for the incurable disease Heathen's Touch, or the Rot. Moog is gay and lost his husband, Fredrick, to the Rot long ago. Moog possesses a bottomless bag that holds most of his possessions, and in combat, he employs various random magic objects, most of which are either ineffective or backfire. Moog is comparable to the keyboardist of the band.
- Matrick "Matty" Skulldrummer: The Band's rogue and formerly notorious alcoholic and womanizer, Matrick has since become the King of Agria and has surprisingly proven to be a good and benevolent ruler. Matrick has gained much weight since Saga separated and is married to Lilith, who forbids Matrick from leaving the royal castle under threat of death in fear that he will sire a true royal heir. Matrick has five illegitimate children who are all products of Lilith cheating on him with various other men, but he loves them nonetheless. Matrick's primary weapons are Roxy and Grace, two daggers, whom he named after the women he lost his virginity to. Matrick is likened to a rock drummer.
- Ganelon: A legendary warrior with a mysterious past, Ganelon is a pragmatic killer and Saga's main muscle. The son of a Southerner woman and a Northman, Ganelon's past is largely unknown before meeting and joining Saga. Ganelon had been sent to the Quarry, a prison for the most dangerous people where all the prisoners are petrified, as punishment for killing a Narmeeri prince who was also the Sultana's son, and because of that, Ganelon is the only member of Saga who hasn't aged in the twenty years they were separated. Ganelon's primary weapon is Syrinx, a battleaxe enscribed with unknown sigils and runes that only Ganelon can wield effectively. Syrinx also whispers in an unknown language whenever Ganelon holds it. Ganelon is similar to a rock guitarist.
- Kallorek "The Orc": Nicknamed 'The Orc' due to his underbite, Kallorek is Saga's former booker, responsible for getting them monster-slaying gigs when they were active. He has since expanded his operations and is responsible for booking most of the new bands, making him rich. Kallorek apparently used to be a simple street thug before discovering his knack for booking. Kallorek convinces Gabriel to sell him Vellichor, and he has also seduced Gabriel's ex-wife Valery and addicted her to drugs. Kallorek owns an impressive collection of magic items, which is later raided by Saga. Kallorek eventually plummets to his death after threatening Clay's family, whereupon Clay threw him over the rail of the flying ship.
- Larkspur: Larkspur is a bounty hunter who is hired by Lilith to capture Matrick and bring him back so she can execute him. She is a daeva, a rare, mysterious species that resemble humans but have wings, and are also capable of a 'compulsion' effect that forces nearby people to be entranced by her. From what is known about her backstory, Larkspur was born to an abusive father who abandoned her, and she grew up in a village being ruthlessly taunted and tortured by the local children. She eventually brutally slaughtered everyone, took over her school, and turned it into her base of operations. Larkspur has her own skyship, named the Dark Star, and has a following of red-robed monks that usually accompanies her. After she is struck by lightning, she seems to develop amnesia and introduces herself as "Sabbatha", apparently her birth name. She acquires Umbra, Shadow's scythe, and forms a relationship with Ganelon that eventually causes her heel-face turn. In the epilogue, it's revealed that Larkspur has borne Ganelon's child.
- Kitagra "the Unkillable": A revenant, Kit is an ancient soul who joins Saga as their newest bard, after a long string of other Saga bards who all died quickly. Kit is comparable to a zombie, the difference being that Kit has retained his full intelligence and does not hunger for flesh. Kit is well-traveled, having wandered the world for thousands of years, and is also an old friend of Moog. Kit was trapped in a coffin in Kallorek's collection when Clay and Gabe came to get Vellichor, and later escaped and encountered the band on Kallorek's skyship. In life, Kit was a servant of the Emperor of Castia, and would frequently sleep with his wife before one day getting drunk and bashing a peacock to death after it bit him, before realizing it was a phoenix, which then set the garden ablaze and flew off. The Emperor then killed Kit.
- Gregor and Dane are an ettin, a type of two-headed giant-kin. Dane was apparently born with severe birth defects and is blind, and Gregor describes to Dane a much brighter world, to Dane's awe. Gregor is killed by a Rask while crossing the Cold Road, and Dane dies soon after.
- Lastleaf: Also known as the Heathen and the Duke of Endland, Lastleaf is a druin, an ancient race of rabbit-eared humanoids who are from another dimension. The druin arrived in the world of the story via Vellichor, using it to carve a doorway, and subsequently enslaved the primitive human and monster populations and built the Dominion, a vast empire. While immortal in this new world, the druin are also only able to give birth to one child per woman, and as a result, their population began to decline. Vespian, the ruler of the Dominion and Lastleaf's father, began to sacrifice other druins to repeatedly resurrect his deceased wife Astra, prompting Lastleaf to steal the sword used to do it and hide in the Heartwyld. In combat, Lastleaf uses three different swords: Scorn, a sword seemingly made of volcanic rock and magma that is capable of summoning lava pools; Madrigal, a sword so sharp that it constantly cuts the air itself, hence its distinctive ringing noise; and Tamarat, the sword forged by Vespian to resurrect Astra with a blade made out of nothingness. Lastleaf also possesses an ability called 'The Prescience' that is common to all druins and allows them to see several seconds into the near future, making them deadly combatants. Lastleaf kills himself with Tamarat after being defeated by Gabe, providing the plot of the sequel book.
- Lady Jain: Formerly a bandit leader of a group of female archers named the Silk Arrows, Lady Jain appears multiple times in the story. She and her bandits first rob Clay and Gabriel of all their possessions outside of Coverdale, except for Blackheart, Clay's shield, and Gabe's stone collection, which he had planned to put on Rose's grave in case she was dead. She then robs the Band again shortly after they fake Matrick's death, cooking them breakfast as well, and later appears again as a reformed band. She fights alongside all the other mercenaries at the Battle of Castia, and accompanies Clay and Gabriel on the way home. Jain is affable and eccentric and usually wears multiple layers of mismatched clothes, including a pair of gloves with the fingertips cut off to shoot a bow better.
- Rose: Rose, nicknamed "Bloody Rose" as a mercenary, is Gabriel's rebellious daughter who ran away to join a band. After answering a call by the courts to face the Heartwyld Horde, her band is killed, and she is trapped in Castia, sparking the reemergence of Saga. Rose is a main character in the sequel, Bloody Rose.

== Reception ==
The book has been compared to a Dungeons & Dragons campaign, such as Forgotten Realms, with its characters filling similar roles to those of the typical character classes selected in the role-playing game. The book has also been compared to the Bethesda video game The Elder Scrolls V: Skyrim, which contains similar fantasy themes and adventurous mercenaries. Abdallah Mbajja wrote in The Observer that "Kings of the Wyld feels like an online RPG come to life."

Samuel Ruth wrote in Tufts Now that the "book is an engaging, funny work that somehow both inhabits and subverts many of the traditional fantasy tropes." The Publishers Weekly review praised the book, saying that "the plot is emotionally rewarding, original, and hilarious."

In an article on Out of This World Reviews, Scott Marlowe criticized the book, saying that "the frequency of pop culture references ... [is] like a bad Andy Weir novel, the childish antics of our group of heroes and the predicaments they somehow get themselves into are tiring." While Niki Hawkes praised the book for a similar reason in The Southern Utah Independent, saying that "All of the characters were individualized and funny in their own way[,] ... [a]dd to that a ton of nerdy references and you have one hella fun book!"

=== Awards ===
Award	Date	Category	Result	Ref.
The David Gemmell Awards	2018	The Morningstar Award for Best Fantasy Newcomer	Won	
r/Fantasy Stabby Award	2017	Best Debut Novel	Won	

== Adaptation ==
On November 12, 2019, Eames said on Twitter that the film rights to The Band had been sold to an anonymous entity, but whether or not being optioned would actually lead to a film being made was still uncertain. The artwork included in the pitch was done by artist Pierre Santamaria.
