= Blindsight (Watts novel) =

2006 novel by Peter Watts

- Author: Peter Watts
- Cover artist: Thomas Pringle
- Language: English
- Genre: Hard science fiction
- Publisher: Tor Books: JP: Tokyo Sogensha
- Publication date: 3 October 2006
- Publication place: Canada
- Media type: Print (hardback)
- Pages: 384
- ISBN: 978-0-7653-1218-1
- OCLC: 64289149
- Dewey Decimal: 813/.622
- LC Class: PR9199.3.W386 B58 2006
- Followed by: Echopraxia

Blindsight is a hard science fiction novel by Canadian writer Peter Watts, published by Tor Books in 2006. It won the Seiun Award for the best novel in Japanese translation (where it is published by Tokyo Sogensha) and was nominated for the Hugo Award for Best Novel, the John W. Campbell Memorial Award for Best Science Fiction Novel, and the Locus Award for Best Science Fiction Novel. The story follows a crew of astronauts sent to investigate a trans-Neptunian comet dubbed "Burns-Caulfield" that has been found to be transmitting an unidentified radio signal, followed by their subsequent first contact. The novel explores themes of identity, consciousness, free will, artificial intelligence, neurology, and game theory as well as evolution and biology.

Blindsight is available online under a Creative Commons Attribution-NonCommercial-ShareAlike license. Its sequel (or "sidequel"), Echopraxia, came out in 2014.

== Plot ==
In the year 2082, tens of thousands of coordinated comet-like objects of an unknown origin, dubbed "Fireflies", burn up in the Earth's atmosphere in a precise grid, while momentarily broadcasting across an immense portion of the electromagnetic spectrum, catching humanity off guard and alerting it to an undeniable extraterrestrial presence. It is suspected that the entire planet has been surveyed in one effective sweep. Despite the magnitude of this "Firefall", human politics soon return to normal.

Soon afterwards, a comet-surveying satellite stumbles across a radio transmission originating from a comet, subsequently named 'Burns-Caulfield'. This tight-beam broadcast is directed to an unknown location and in fact does not intersect the Earth at any point. As this is the first opportunity to learn more about the extraterrestrials, three waves of ships are sent out: the first being lightweight probes shot out for an as-soon-as-possible flyby of the comet, then a wave of heavier but better-equipped probes, and finally a crewed ship, the Theseus.

Theseus is propelled by an antimatter reactor and captained by an artificial intelligence. It carries a crew of five cutting-edge transhuman hyper-specialists, of whom one is a genetically reincarnated vampire who acts as the nominal mission commander. While the crew is in hibernation en route, the just-arrived second wave of probes commence a compounded radar scan of the subsurface of Burns-Caulfield, but this immediately causes the object to self-destruct. Theseus is re-routed mid-flight to the new-found destination of the signal: a previously undetected sub-brown dwarf deep in the Oort cloud, dubbed 'Big Ben'.

The crew wakes from hibernation while the Theseus closes on Big Ben. They discover a giant, concealed object in the vicinity, and assume it to be a vessel of some kind. As soon as the crew uncloaks the vessel, it immediately hails them over radio and, in a range of languages varying from English to Chinese, identifies itself as 'Rorschach'. They determine that Rorschach must have learned human languages by eavesdropping on comm-chatter since its arrival, sometime after the Broadcast Age began. Over the course of a few days many questions and answers are exchanged by both parties. Eventually Susan James, the linguist, determines that 'Rorschach' does not really understand what either party is actually saying.

Theseus probes Rorschach and finds it to have hollow sections, some with atmosphere, all filled with levels of radiation that render remote operation of machinery virtually impossible and would kill a human in a matter of hours. Despite this and over Rorschach's objections the whole crew except the mission commander enters and explores in a series of short forays, using the ship's advanced medical facilities to recover from the damage the radiation inflicts on their bodies. They discover the presence of highly evasive, fast-moving nine-legged organisms dubbed 'Scramblers'. They kill one and capture two for study. The 'Scramblers' appear to have orders of magnitude more brainpower than human beings but use most of it simply to operate their fantastically complex musculature and sensory organs; they are more akin to something like white blood cells in a human body. They are dependent on the radiation and EM fields of Rorschach for basic biological functions and seem to completely lack consciousness.

The crew explore questions of identity, the nature, utility and interdependence of intelligence and consciousness. They theorize that humanity could be an unusual offshoot of evolution, wasting bodily and economic resources on the self-aware ego which has little value in terms of Darwinian fitness. Open warfare breaks out between the humans and the Scramblers and Theseus eventually decides to sacrifice itself and its crew using its antimatter payload to eliminate Rorschach. One crew member, the protagonist and narrator Siri Keeton, is shot off inside an escape vessel in a decades-long fall back to Earth to relay the crucial information amassed back to humanity. However, due to a message from his father he suspects that humanity has already been overrun by the vampires they resurrected.

== Characters ==
=== Crew of the Theseus ===
- Siri Keeton is the narrator and protagonist. Debilitating brain surgery for medical purposes has cut him off from his own emotional life and made him a talented "synthesist", adept at reading others' intentions impartially with the aid of cybernetics. He is assigned to Theseus to interpret the actions of the specialized crew and report these activities to Mission Control on Earth.
- Major Amanda Bates is a combat specialist, controlling an army of robotic "grunts".
- Isaac Szpindel is the ship's primary biologist and physician. He is in love with Michelle, one of the Gang's personalities.
- Jukka Sarasti is a vampire and the crew's nominal (and frightening) leader. As a predator from the Pleistocene, he is alleged to be far smarter than baseline humans.
- The Gang are four distinct personalities in the mind of one woman, the ship's linguist. They are tasked with communicating with the aliens, if possible. A single personality "surfaces" to take control of their body at any given time. The active personality reveals itself through a change in tone and posture. These personalities express offence when referred to as "alters". The personalities are:
  - Susan James, whom the others refer to as "Mom". She is the "original" personality.
  - Michelle is a shy, quiet, synaesthetic woman who is romantically involved with Szpindel.
  - Sascha is harsher and more overtly hostile towards Siri.
  - Cruncher, a male personality, rarely surfaces and serves as an advanced data-processing facility for James.
- Robert Cunningham, Szpindel's backup, is a secondary biologist/physician. He possesses a set of enhancements that allow him to process data with additional senses, and somewhat inhabits the machinery connected to him.
- The Captain is the ship's artificial intelligence. Throughout the story, the Captain remains inscrutable and mysterious, generally communicating directly only with Sarasti.

=== People on Earth ===
- Robert Paglino, Siri's childhood best friend and a practical example of Siri's muted emotions: Siri cannot actually feel "friendship" following his brain surgery, but intellectually knows how he is expected to behave as a friend and continues to play the part.
- Chelsea, Siri's ex-girlfriend. A professional tweaker of human personalities.
- Helen Keeton, Siri's mother, whose consciousness has been connected, brain in a vat style, to a virtual utopia called "Heaven". As a parent, she traumatized Siri with emotional demands and intrusiveness into his private life.
- Jim Moore is Siri's father, a colonel involved with planetary defence.

=== Aliens ===
- Rorschach, an alien vessel or organism in low orbit around the sub-brown dwarf Big Ben. While it has a superhuman intelligence, it gradually becomes apparent that Rorschach completely lacks true consciousness or self-awareness.
- Scramblers, 9-legged anaerobic aliens that inhabit Rorschach and appear to be part of it in some sense. Like Rorschach, they are more intelligent than humans but not conscious or self-aware.

== Major themes ==
=== Consciousness ===
The exploration of consciousness is the central thematic element of Blindsight. The title of the novel refers to the condition blindsight, in which vision is non-functional in the conscious brain but remains useful to non-conscious action. Other conditions, such as Cotard delusion and Anton–Babinski syndrome, are used to illustrate differences from the usual assumptions about conscious experience. The novel raises questions about the essential character of consciousness. Is the interior experience of consciousness necessary, or is externally observed behaviour the sole determining characteristic of conscious experience? Is an interior emotional experience necessary for empathy, or is empathic behaviour sufficient to possess empathy? Relevant to these questions is a plot element near the climax of the story, in which the vampire captain is revealed to have been controlled by the ship's artificial intelligence for the entirety of the novel.

Philosopher John Searle's Chinese room thought experiment is used as a metaphor to illustrate the tension between the notions of consciousness as an interior experience of understanding, as contrasted with consciousness as the emergent result of merely functional non-introspective components. Blindsight contributes to this debate by implying that some aspects of consciousness are empirically detectable. Specifically, the novel supposes that consciousness is necessary for both aesthetic appreciation and effective communication. However, the possibility is raised that consciousness is, for humanity, an evolutionary dead end. That is, consciousness may have been naturally selected as a solution for the challenges of a specific place in space and time, but will become a limitation as conditions change or competing intelligences are encountered.

The alien creatures encountered by the crew of the Theseus themselves lack consciousness. The necessity of consciousness for effective communication is illustrated by a passage from the novel in which the linguist realizes that the alien creatures cannot be, in fact, conscious because of their lack of semantic understanding:

"Tell me more about your cousins," Rorschach sent.
"Our cousins lie about the family tree," Sascha replied, "with nieces and nephews and Neanderthals. We do not like annoying cousins."
"We'd like to know about this tree."
Sascha muted the channel and gave us a look that said Could it be any more obvious? "It couldn't have parsed that. There were three linguistic ambiguities in there. It just ignored them."
"Well, it asked for clarification," Bates pointed out.
"It asked a follow-up question. Different thing entirely."

The notion that these aliens could lack consciousness and possess intelligence is linked to the idea that some humans could also have diminished consciousness and remain outwardly functional. This idea is similar to the concept of philosophical zombie, as it is understood in philosophy of mind. Blindsight supposes that sociopaths might be a manifestation of this same phenomenon, and the demands of corporate environments might be environmental factors causing some part of humanity to evolve toward becoming philosophical zombies.

==== Bicameral mind ====
See Bicameral mentality

=== Transhumanism ===
Blindsight also explores the implications of a transhuman future. Within the novel, humans no longer engage in sex with other humans for pleasure, instead choosing to use virtual reality to find idealized partners, and many choose to withdraw from reality entirely by living in constructed virtual worlds, referred to as "Heaven". Vampires are predators from humanity's distant past, resurrected through recovered DNA, and live among the humans of the late 21st century. These vampires operate with diminished sentience presented as comparable to high-functional autism with comparable dysfunction in affect and speech, but have the advantage of multiple simultaneous thoughts occurring in parallel within their minds. Enhanced pattern-matching skills comparable to some forms of autism combine with this "hyperthreading" to make them invaluable in developing unusual and often very effective approaches to solving complex problems.

== Reception ==
Carl Hayes, in his review for Booklist, wrote, "Watts packs in enough tantalizing ideas for a score of novels while spinning new twists on every cutting-edge motif from virtual reality to extraterrestrial biology." Kirkus Reviews said about the book, "Watts carries several complications too many, but presents nonetheless a searching, disconcerting, challenging, sometimes piercing inquisition." Jackie Cassida in her review for Library Journal wrote, "Watts continues to challenge readers with his imaginative plots and superb storytelling." Publishers Weekly wrote, "Watts puts a terrifying and original spin on the familiar alien contact story."

Elizabeth Bear, an award-winning author in the science fiction field, declared the following:

It's my opinion that Peter Watts's Blindsight is the best hard science fiction novel of the first decade of this millennium – and I say that as someone who remains unconvinced of all the ramifications of its central argument. Watts is one of the crown princes of science fiction's most difficult subgenre: his work is rigorous, unsentimental, and full of the sort of brilliant little moments of synthesis that make a nerd's brain light up like a pinball machine. But he's also a poet – a damned fine writer on a sentence level...

== Adaptations ==
In October 2020 a non-commercial Blindsight short film was released. Watts describes it as, "snatches of Blindsight recalled by Siri Keeton during one of his waking interludes in the aftermath of that novel. Spectacular highlights arranged in reverse order, Memento-like". In April 2025, Neill Blomkamp was set to adapt the novel into a feature film.
