= Peter Watts (author) =

Canadian science fiction author (born 1958)

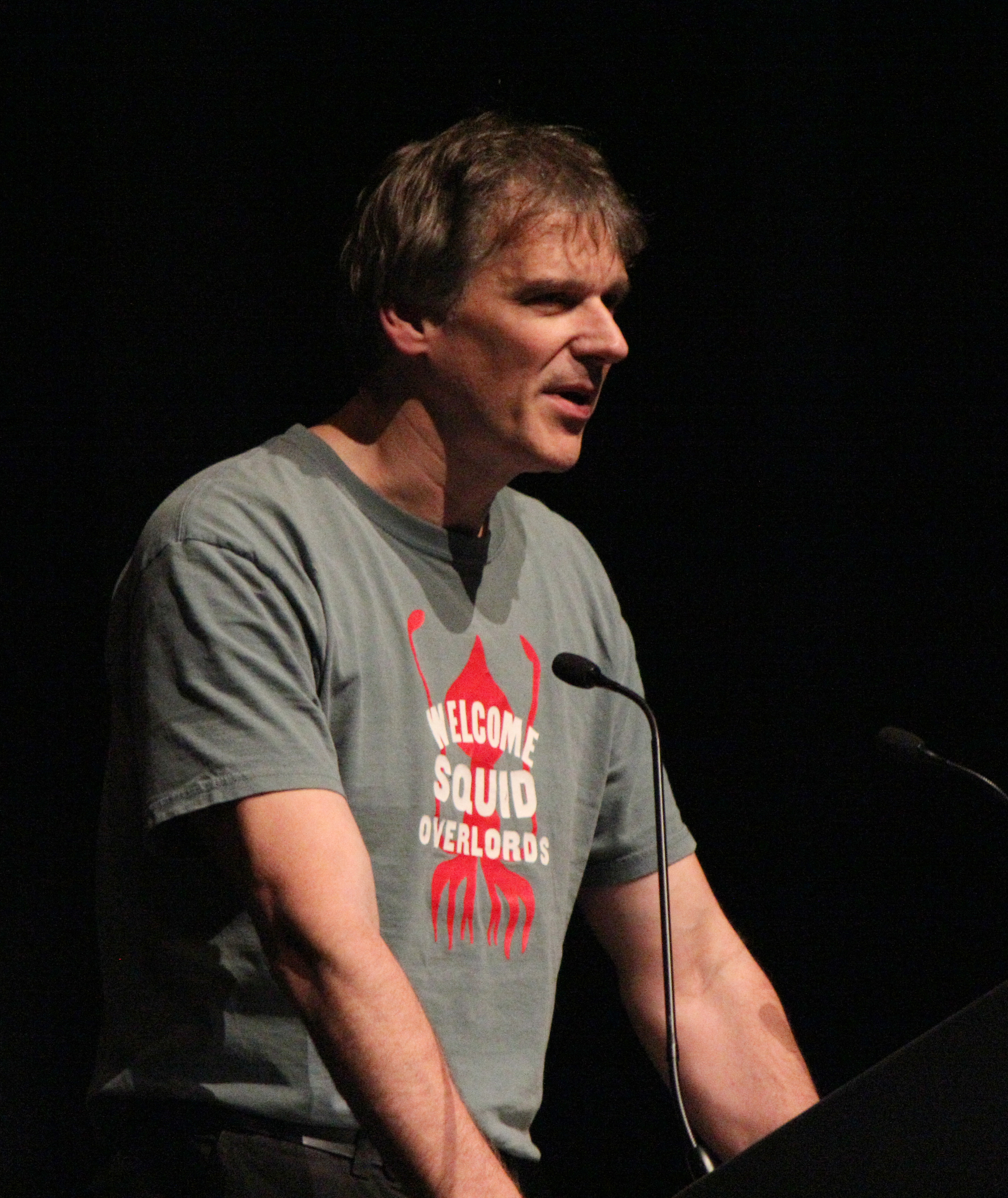
- Watts' acceptance speech at the 2010 Hugo Awards ceremony
- Born: 25 January 1958 (age 68); Canada
- Education: University of Guelph; University of British Columbia
- Occupation: Writer
- Spouse: Caitlin Sweet (August 2011–present)
- Writing career
- Period: 1990–present
- Genre: Science fiction
- Notable work: Blindsight
- Website: rifters.com

Peter Watts (born January 25, 1958) is a Canadian science fiction author. He specializes in hard science fiction. He earned a Ph.D. from the University of British Columbia in 1991 from the Department of Zoology and Resource Ecology. He went on to hold several academic research and teaching positions, and worked as a marine-mammal biologist. He began publishing fiction around the time he finished graduate school.

== Career ==
His first novel Starfish (1999) reintroduced Lenie Clarke from his short story "A Niche" (1990); Clarke is a deep-ocean power station worker physically altered for underwater living and the main character in the sequels: Maelstrom (2001), βehemoth: β-Max (2004) and βehemoth: Seppuku (2005). The last two volumes constitute one novel, but were published separately for commercial reasons. Starfish, Maelstrom, and βehemoth make up a trilogy usually referred to as "Rifters" after the modified humans designed to work in deep-ocean environments.

His novel Blindsight, released in October 2006, was nominated for a Hugo Award. The novel was described by Charles Stross: "Imagine a neurobiology-obsessed version of Greg Egan writing a first contact with aliens story from the point of view of a zombie posthuman crewman aboard a starship captained by a vampire, with not dying as the booby prize." Echopraxia (2014) is a "sidequel" about events happening on Earth and elsewhere concurrent with the events in Blindsight.

Watts has made some of his novels and short fiction available on his website under a Creative Commons license. He believes that doing so has "actually saved [his] career outright, by rescuing Blindsight from the oblivion to which it would have otherwise been doomed. The week after [he] started giving Blindsight away, sales tripled."

In addition to writing novels and short stories, Watts has also worked in other media. He was peripherally involved in the early stages of the animated science fiction film and television project Strange Frame. He also worked briefly with Relic Entertainment on one of the early drafts of the story that would eventually, years later, become Homeworld 2. However, the draft Watts worked on bears no resemblance to the one used for the released game. More recently, he has been recruited by Crytek as a writer and art consultant on Crysis 2. Technological elements from Blindsight have been referenced in the fictional Crysis 2 "Nanosuit Brochure"; the creative director of BioShock 2 has cited Watts's work as an influence on that game.

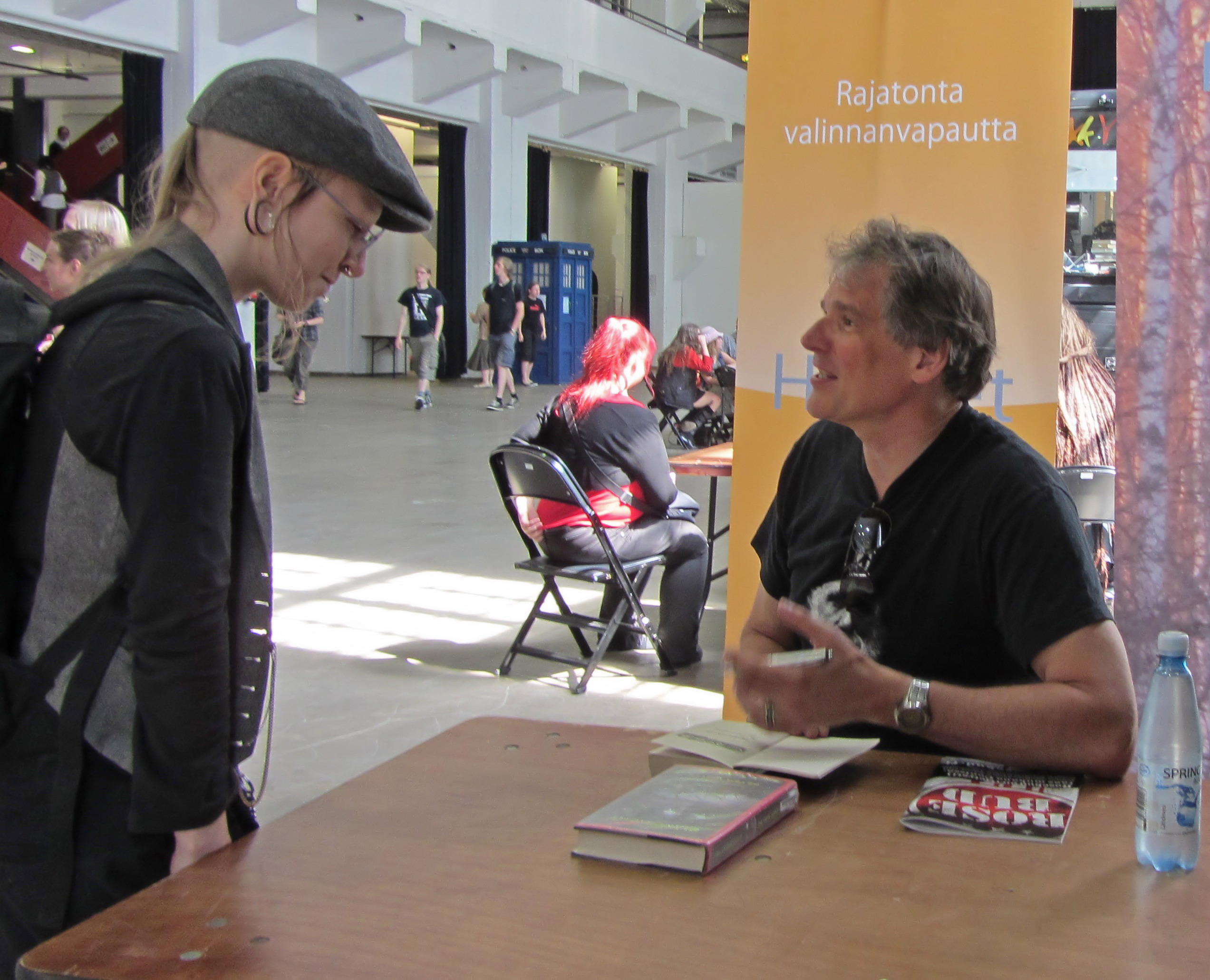
Watts at Finncon 2013 in Helsinki, Finland

== Personal life ==
In December 2009, Watts was detained at the Canada–United States border by U.S. Customs and Border Protection (CBP) to perform a reportedly random search of the rental vehicle he was driving. Watts is alleged to have assaulted a CBP Officer and was turned over to local authorities to face charges. According to an officer, the authorities used pepper spray to subdue Watts after Watts became aggressive toward officers. According to Watts, he was assaulted, punched in the face, pepper-sprayed, and thrown in jail for the night. The officer later admitted in court that he had punched Watts. A jury found Watts guilty of obstructing a U.S. Customs and Border Protection officer. He faced a maximum sentence of 2 years in prison. Watts blogged about his sentence saying that because of how the law was written, his asking, "What is the problem?", was enough to convict him of non-compliance. In April 2010, he was given a suspended sentence and a fine. However, due to immigration laws, Watts' felony conviction prevents him from re-entering the United States.

In February 2011, Watts contracted the rare disease necrotizing fasciitis in his leg, which he has blogged about on his website.

He married fellow Canadian author Caitlin Sweet in August 2011.

== Bibliography ==
=== Novels ===
==== Rifters trilogy ====
- Starfish (July 1999, Tor Books, ISBN 978-0-312-86855-0)
- Maelstrom (October 2001, Tor Books, ISBN 978-0-312-87806-1)
- βehemoth (published in two volumes):
  - βehemoth: β-Max (July 2004, Tor Books, ISBN 978-0-7653-0721-7)
  - βehemoth: Seppuku (December 2004, Tor Books, ISBN 978-0-7653-1172-6)

==== Firefall ====
- Blindsight (October 2006, Tor Books, ISBN 978-0-7653-1218-1)
- Echopraxia (August 2014, Tor Books, ISBN 978-0-7653-2802-1)
- Firefall (August 2014, Head of Zeus, ISBN 978-1-7840-8046-4). Omnibus edition of Blindsight and Echopraxia.

==== Other ====
- Crysis: Legion (released on 22 March 2011. Novelization of the video-game Crysis 2)
- Peter Watts Is an Angry Sentient Tumor: Revenge Fantasies and Essays (12 November 2019, Tachyon Publications, ISBN 978-1-61696-319-4)

=== Collections ===
- Ten Monkeys, Ten Minutes (November 2002, Tesseract Books, ISBN 978-1-895836-74-5)
- Beyond the Rift (2013, Tachyon Publications, ISBN 978-1-61696-125-1)
- Fold Catastrophes (22 September 2026, Tachyon Publications, ISBN 978-1-61696-467-2)

=== Short stories, novelettes, and novellas ===
==== Sunflower cycle ====
The Sunflower series of stories concerns the voyage of a jumpgate-building ship named Eriophora:

- "The Island" (The New Space Opera 2, 2009)
- "Hotshot" (Reach for Infinity, 2014)
- "Giants" (Clarkesworld Magazine, September 2014)
- The Freeze-Frame Revolution (2018, Tachyon Publications, ISBN 978-1-61696-252-4)
- "Hitchhiker" (2018, story fragment, published online. Link was in The Freeze-Frame Revolution)
- "Strategic Retreat" (2021, story fragment, published online)
- "Remora" (2022, story fragment, published online. Available through Watts's blog.)
- "Outtake" (2025, story fragment, published online. Available through Watts's blog.)
- "Periscope Depth" (2026, story fragment, published online. Available through Watts's blog.).
- Gremlin (2027, Tachyon Publications, ISBN 978-1-61696-477-1)

The chronological order within the Sunflower universe is: "Hotshot", The Freeze-Frame Revolution, "Giants", "Hitchhiker", "Strategic Retreat", "Remora", "Outtake", "The Island".

==== Others ====
- "A Niche" (Tesseracts, 1990)
- "Nimbus" (On Spec, 1994)
- "Flesh Made Word" (Prairie Fire Magazine, 1994)
- "Fractals" (On Spec, 1995)
- "Bethlehem" (Tesseracts 5, 1996)
- "The Second Coming of Jasmine Fitzgerald" (Divine Realms, 1998)
- "Home" (On Spec, 1999)
- "Bulk Food" (On Spec, 2000) with Laurie Channer
- "Ambassador" (Ten Monkeys, Ten Minutes, 2002)
- "A Word for Heathens" (ReVisions, 2004)
- "Mayfly" (Tesseracts 9, 2005) with Derryl Murphy
- "Repeating the Past" (Nature Magazine, 2007)
- "The Eyes of God" (The Solaris Book of New Science Fiction: Volume 2, 2008)
- "Hillcrest v. Velikovsky" (Nature Magazine, 2008)
- "The Things" (Clarkesworld Magazine, January 2010)
- "Malak" (Engineering Infinity, edited by Jonathan Strahan, December 2010)
- "Firebrand" (Twelve Tomorrows, 2013)
- "The Colonel" (Tor.com, 29 July 2014) (Canonically a part of the Firefall series set after the beginning of Blindsight.)
- "Collateral" (Upgraded, 2014) available on-line
- "Colony Creature" (2015)
- "ZeroS" (Infinity Wars, edited by Jonathan Strahan, September 2017)
- "Incorruptible." (Flight 008, edited by K. Cramer/Xprize Foundation 2018)
- "Kindred" (Infinity's End, edited by Jonathan Strahan, July 2018)
- "Gut Feelings" (Toronto 2033, November 2018)
- "Cyclopterus" (Mission Critical, edited by Jonathan Strahan, July 2019)
- "The Wisdom of Crowds" (Special 11th edition of Šum, journal for contemporary art criticism and theory, 2019)
- "The Last of the Redmond Billionaires" (New Decameron Project, edited by J. Walton, 2020)
- "Test 4 Echo" (Made To Order: Robots and Revolution, edited by Jonathan Strahan, 2021) available on-line
- "Critical Mass" (Lightspeed 146, July 2022) available on-line
- "Contracting Iris" (Lightspeed 154, March 2023) available on-line
- "Defective" (Life Beyond Us: An Original Anthology of SF Stories and Science Essays, edited by J. Nováková, 2023)
- "Prompt Injection" (World Building: Gaming and Art in the Digital Age, edited by Hans Obrist September 2024)
- "The Twenty-One Second God" (Lightspeed, June 2025 (Issue 181), part of the Firefall setting) available on-line

== Awards and critical reception ==
=== "A Niche" ===
- Winner 1992 Prix Aurora Award (tied with Breaking Ball by Michael Skeet)

=== Starfish ===
- Nominee 2000 Campbell Award

=== Blindsight ===
- Nominee 2007 Hugo Award for Best Novel
- Nominee 2007 Campbell Award
- Nominee 2007 Locus Award for Best SF Novel
- Shortlisted 2010 Geffen Award
- Winner 2014 Tähtivaeltaja Award
- Winner 2014 Seiun Award for Best Translated Novel

=== "The Island" ===
- Winner 2010 Hugo Award for Best Novelette
- Nominee 2010 Theodore Sturgeon Memorial Award
- Nominee 2010 Locus Award for Best Novelette

=== "The Things" ===
- Finalist 2010 Parsec Award for Best Speculative Fiction Story (Short Form)
- Nominee 2010 BSFA Award for Best Short Story
- Winner 2010 Shirley Jackson Award for Best Short Story
- Nominee 2011 Hugo Award for Best Short Story
- 3rd Place 2011 Theodore Sturgeon Memorial Award
- Finalist 2011 Locus Award for Best Short Story

=== Beyond the Rift ===
- Nominee 2017 Grand prix de l'Imaginaire for Foreign Short Fiction

=== The Freeze-Frame Revolution ===
- Finalist 2019 John W. Campbell Memorial Award for Best Science Fiction Novel
- Finalist 2019 Locus Award for Best SF Novella
- Winner 2019 The Nowa Fantastyka Prize for “Best Foreign Book”
