= Magician's Gambit =

- Magician's Gambit cover
- Author: David Eddings and Leigh Eddings
- Language: English
- Series: The Belgariad
- Genre: Fantasy
- Publisher: Del Rey Books
- Publication date: June 1983
- Publication place: USA
- Media type: Hardcover, Paperback
- Pages: 320 (paperback)
- ISBN: 0-345-32731-4
- Preceded by: Queen of Sorcery
- Followed by: Castle of Wizardry

Magician's Gambit is the third part of The Belgariad, a fantasy book series written by David Eddings continuing the events in Queen of Sorcery and is followed by Castle of Wizardry.

== Plot summary ==
Garion and friends go after Ctuchik, the evil Angarak sorcerer who has the Orb.

== Reception ==
Colin Greenland reviewed Magician's Gambit for Imagine magazine, and stated that "For all its accumulated bulk of pages, this really is easy reading. Try it to distract you while you're weaving your next tapestry."

== Reviews ==
- Review by Joseph Nicholas (1984) in Paperback Inferno, Volume 7, Number 6
- Review [French] by Olivier Coron (1991) in Yellow Submarine, #85
- Review [Dutch] by Eya Kuismanen (2005) in Holland-SF 2005, #4
