= Beldin =

Beldin may refer to:

- A character in The Belgariad and The Malloreon, see List of The Belgariad and The Malloreon characters#Disciples of Aldur
- Diphenhydramine, by the trade name Beldin
