= Magician (fantasy) =

Magicians appearing in fantasy fiction

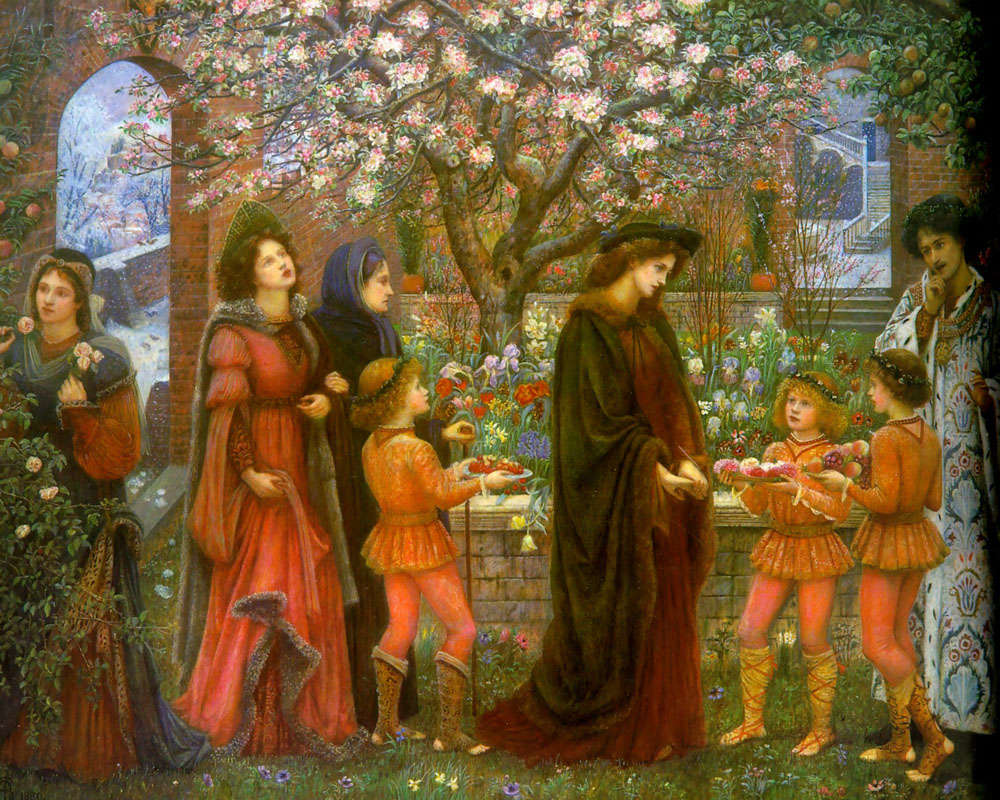
The Enchanted Garden of Messer Ansaldo by Marie Spartali Stillman (1889): A magician uses magic to survive.

A magician, also known as a mage, magus, magic-user, spellcaster, enchanter/enchantress, sorcerer/sorceress, warlock, witch, or wizard, is someone who uses or practices magic derived from supernatural, occult, or arcane sources. Magicians enjoy a rich history in mythology, legends, fiction, and folklore, and are common figures in works of fantasy, such as fantasy literature (as well as comics and animations adopted from it) and role-playing games.

== Character archetypes ==
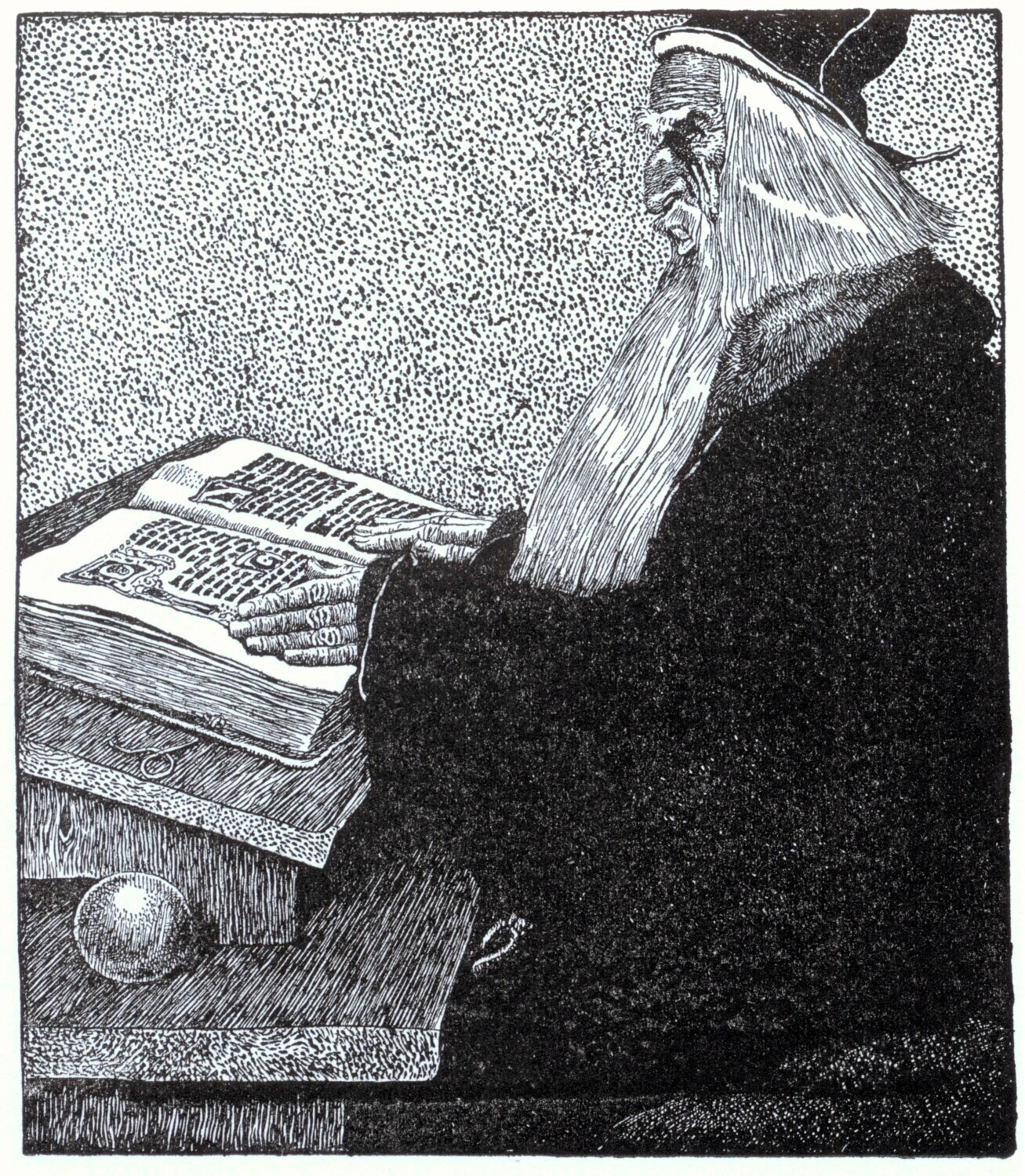
The Enchanter Merlin, by Howard Pyle, from The Story of King Arthur and His Knights (1903)

People who work magic are called by several magic user names in fantasy works, and terminology differs widely from one fantasy world to another. While derived from real-world vocabulary, the terms magician, mage, magus, enchanter/enchantress, sorcerer/sorceress, warlock, witch, and wizard, each have different meanings depending upon context and the story in question.

=== Mage ===
In many fantasy settings, a mage is a general term for a user of magic, or may be a term for a generalist spellcaster. The word mage (and its doublet word "magus") is derived from the Latin magus and, potentially, from the Iranian word for a Zoroastrian priest ("Magi"). An archmage, with the prefix "arch-" meaning "a title in a hierarchy which indicates a higher degree of rank", is used in many fantasy works to indicate a powerful mage or a leader of mages.

=== Enchanter ===
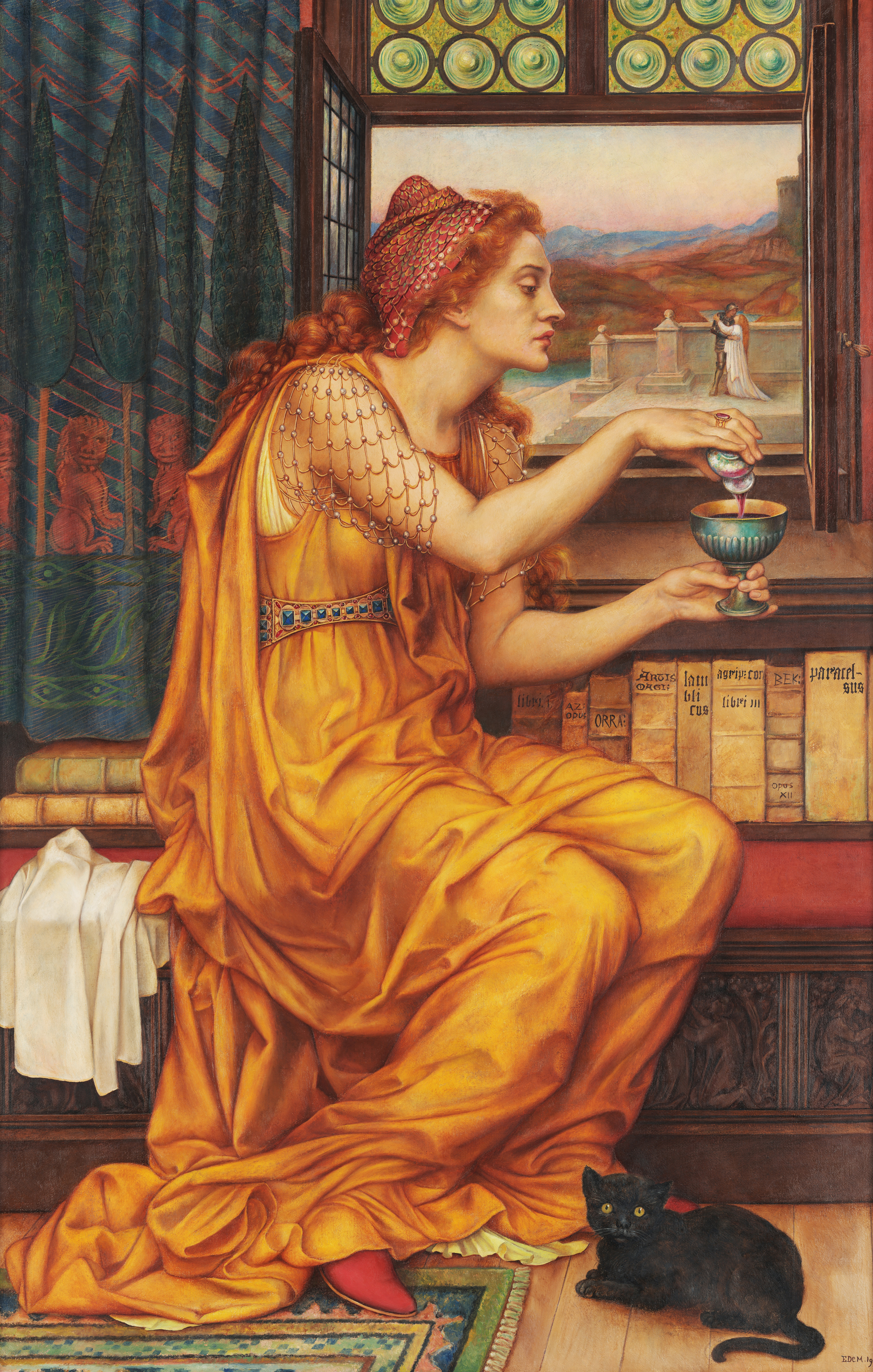
The Love Potion by Evelyn De Morgan (1903)

Enchanters and enchantresses typically practice a type of imbued magic that produces temporary effects on people but that may linger on objects. For example, this could include enchanting a weapon or tool to be more (or less) effective, enchanting a person or object to have a changed shape or appearance, creating illusions intended to deceive the observer, compelling a person to perform an action they might not normally do, or attempting to charm or seduce someone. For instance, the Lady of the Green Kirtle in C. S. Lewis's The Silver Chair is an enchantress who can transform herself into a large green serpent. She also enchants Rilian, compelling him to forget his father and Narnia. And when that enchantment is broken, she attempts further enchantments with a sweet-smelling smoke and a thrumming musical instrument to attempt to baffle him and his rescuers into forgetting them again.

=== Sorcerer ===
The term sorcerer has moved from meaning a fortune-teller, or "one who alters fate", to meaning a practitioner of magic who can alter reality. A female version of a sorcerer is a sorceress. They are also sometimes shown as able to conjure supernatural beings or spirits, or to "animate" inanimate objects, such as in The Sorcerer's Apprentice. Due to this perception of their powers, this character may be depicted as feared, or even seen as evil. Villainous sorcerers were so crucial to pulp fantasy that the genre in which they appeared was dubbed "sword and sorcery", where typically the hero (or anti-hero) would be the sword-wielder, thus leaving the sorcery for his opponent.

=== Witch ===
Witch (an often female practitioner of witchcraft) and wicked (an adjective meaning "bad, evil, false") are both derivative terms from the word, wicca (an Old English word with varied meanings, including soothsayer, astrologer, herbalist, poisoner, seductress, or devotee of supernatural beings or spirits). L. Frank Baum combined these terms in naming the Wicked Witch of the West, and other witches in the Land of Oz. Baum named Glinda the "Good Witch of the South" in The Wonderful Wizard of Oz. In The Marvelous Land of Oz, he dubbed her "Glinda the Good," and from that point forward and in subsequent books, Baum referred to her as a sorceress rather than a witch to avoid the term that was more regarded as evil. While the term “Cunning Folk” is historically how magicians fitting the “good witch” archetype are addressed, modern fiction uses the term “witch” for malevolent, benevolent, and neutral characters alike. This is most notable in literature such as the Harry Potter book series by J. K. Rowling, where “witch” is used as the feminine form of “wizard”. Outside of Harry Potter, the term warlock is often used to denote a male practitioner of witchcraft.

=== Wizard ===
In medieval chivalric romance, the wizard often appears as a wise old man and acts as a mentor, with Merlin from the King Arthur stories being a prime example as well as also working for King Arthur as a court wizard (another word for court magician). Wizards such as Gandalf in The Lord of the Rings and Albus Dumbledore from Harry Potter are also featured as mentors, and Merlin remains prominent as both an educative force and mentor in the modern works of Arthuriana. While many fictions and literature often use the term "witch" as a feminine form of "wizard", a rare feminine term for a female wizard is "wizardess".

Wizards can be cast similarly to the absent-minded professor: being foolish and prone to misconjuring. They can also be capable of great magic, both good and evil. Even comical magicians are often capable of great feats, such as those of Miracle Max in The Princess Bride; although he is a washed-up wizard fired by the villain, he saves the dying hero. Other wizards, such as Saruman from The Lord of the Rings or Lord Voldemort from Harry Potter, can appear as hostile villains.

Ursula K. Le Guin's A Wizard of Earthsea explored the question of how wizards learned their art, introducing to modern fantasy the role of the wizard as the protagonist. This theme has been further developed in modern fantasy, often leading to wizards as heroes on their own quests. Such heroes may have their own mentor, a wizard as well.

== In role-playing games ==
Magicians in role-playing games often use names borrowed from fiction, myth and legend. They are typically delineated and named so that the game's players and game masters can know which rules apply. Gary Gygax and Dave Arneson introduced the term "magic-user" in the original Dungeons & Dragons as a generic term for a practitioner of magic (in order to avoid the connotations of terms such as wizard or warlock); this lasted until the second edition of Advanced Dungeons & Dragons, where it was replaced with mage (later to become wizard). The exact rules vary from game to game. The wizard or mage, as a character class, is distinguished by the ability to cast certain kinds of magic learned from spellbooks, while being vulnerable in direct combat; sub-classes are distinguished by strengths in some areas of magic and weakness in others.

Sorcerers are distinguished from wizards as having an innate gift with magic, as well as having mystical or magical ancestry.

Warlocks are distinguished from wizards as creating forbidden "pacts" with powerful creatures to harness their innate magical gifts, similarly to clerics and paladins, who are empowered through divine and deific sources to perform thaumaturgical feats, while druids and rangers draw power from nature and the elements. Bards, on the other hand, are similar to wizards in learning magical abilities as scholarly practices, but differ in their power being tied to artistic expression rather than arcane knowledge.

== Appearance ==
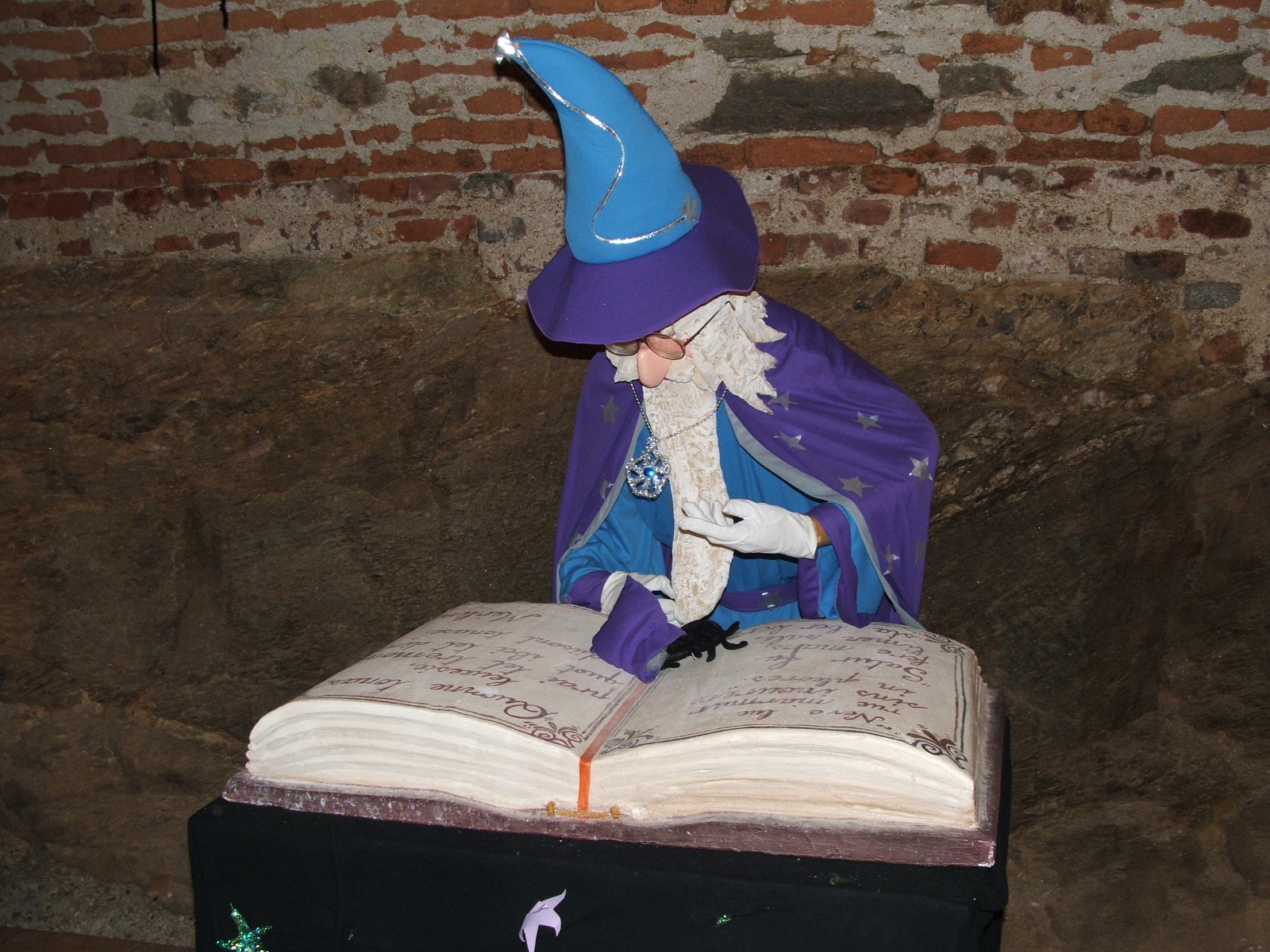
White-haired and white-bearded wizard with robes and hat

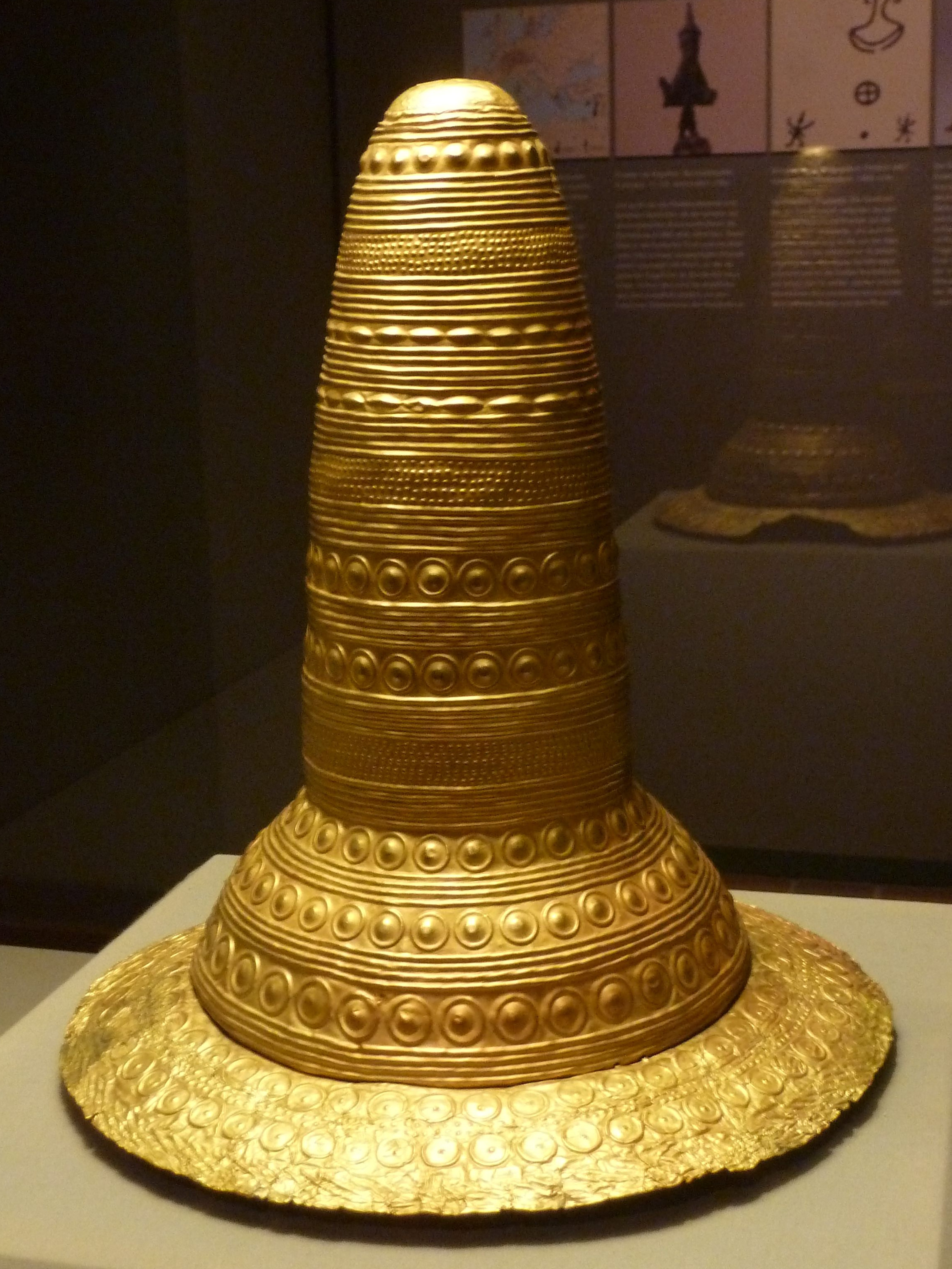
Golden Hat of Schifferstadt, circa 1,400-1,300 BC, Historical Museum of the Palatinate in Speyer, Germany.

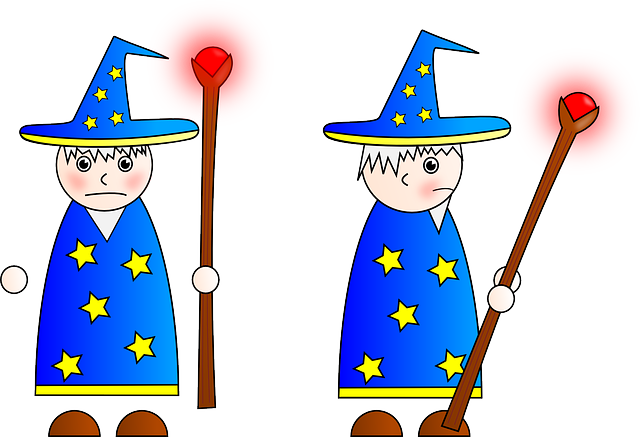
Two wizards with staffs depicted in a cartoon art-style

Due to their traditional image as a wise old man or wise old woman, magicians may be depicted as old, white-haired, and in some instances with their hair (and in the case of male wizards, beards), being long and majestic enough to occasionally host lurking woodland creatures. This depiction predates the modern fantasy genre, being derived from the traditional image of wizards such as Merlin.

Several golden hats adorned with astronomical sequences have been found in Europe. It has been speculated by archaeologists and historians that they were worn by ancient wizards. The similarities shared with a fantasy magician's hat shape may mean that it is ultimately derived from them.

In fantasy, a magician may be shown wearing a pointed hat, robes, and/or a cloak. They may be accompanied by a familiar and possess magical objects such as wands, amulets, or broomsticks. In more modern stories, a magician may be dressed similarly to a stage magician, wearing a top hat and tails, with an optional cape.

Terry Pratchett described robes as a magician's way of establishing to those they meet that they are capable of practicing magic.

In the Dragonlance campaign setting of the Dungeons & Dragons role-playing game, wizards show their moral alignment by the colour of their robes.

=== Magical implements ===
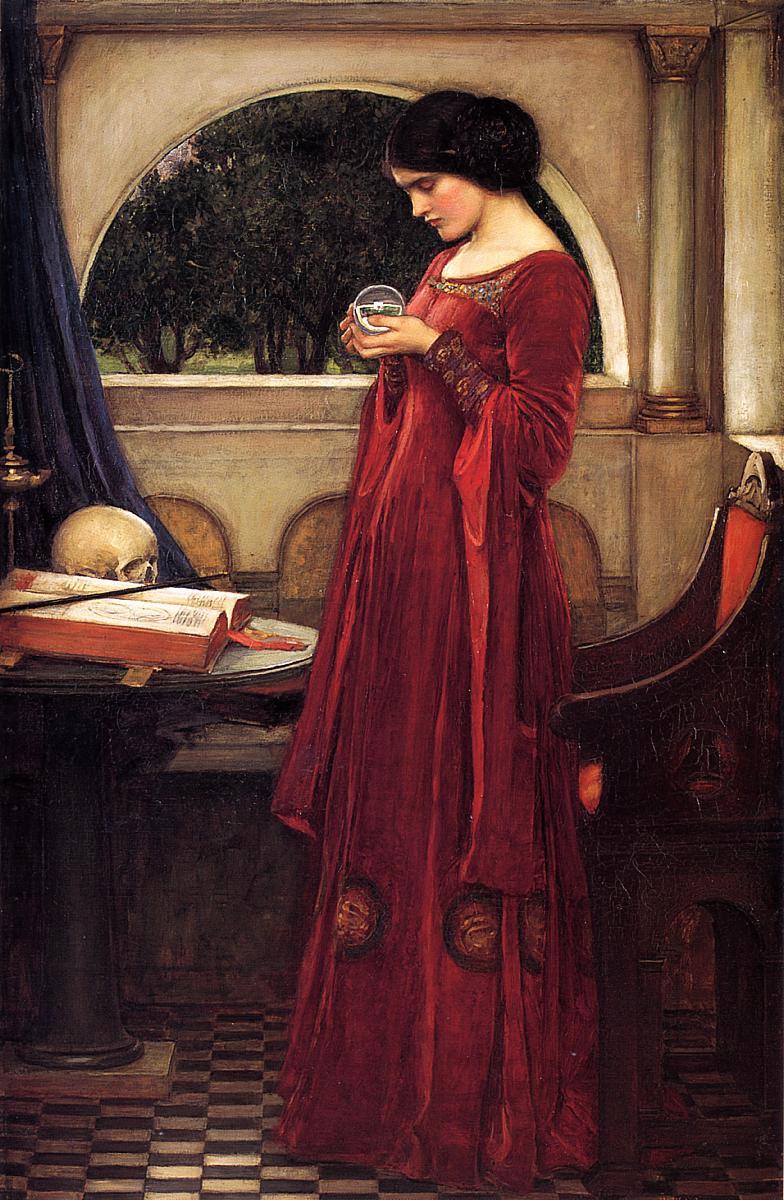
The Crystal Ball by John William Waterhouse (1902): showing implements used for magical purposes; the crystal, a book, a skull, and a wand

A magician's crystal ball is a crystal or glass ball commonly associated with clairvoyance, fortune-telling, or scrying.

Wands and staves have long been used as requirements for the magician. Possibly derived from wand-like implements used in fertility rituals, such as apotropaic wands, the earliest known instance of the modern magical wand was featured in the Odyssey, used by Circe to transform Odysseus's men into animals. Italian fairy tales put wands into the hands of powerful fairies by the Late Middle Ages. Today, magical wands are widespread in literature and are used from Witch World to Harry Potter. In The Lord of the Rings, Gandalf refuses to surrender his own staff, breaking Saruman's, which strips the latter of his power. This dependency on a particular magical item is common, and necessary to limit the magician's power for the story's sake – without it, the magician's powers may be weakened or absent entirely. In the Harry Potter universe, a wizard must expend much greater effort and concentration to use magic without a wand, and only a few can control magic without one; taking away a wizard's wand in battle essentially disarms them.

In the Enchanted Forest Chronicles, Patricia Wrede depicts wizards who use magic based on their staves, and magicians who practice several kinds of magic, including wizard magic; in the Regency fantasies, she and Caroline Stevermer depict magicians as identical to wizards, though inferior in skill and training.

== Education ==
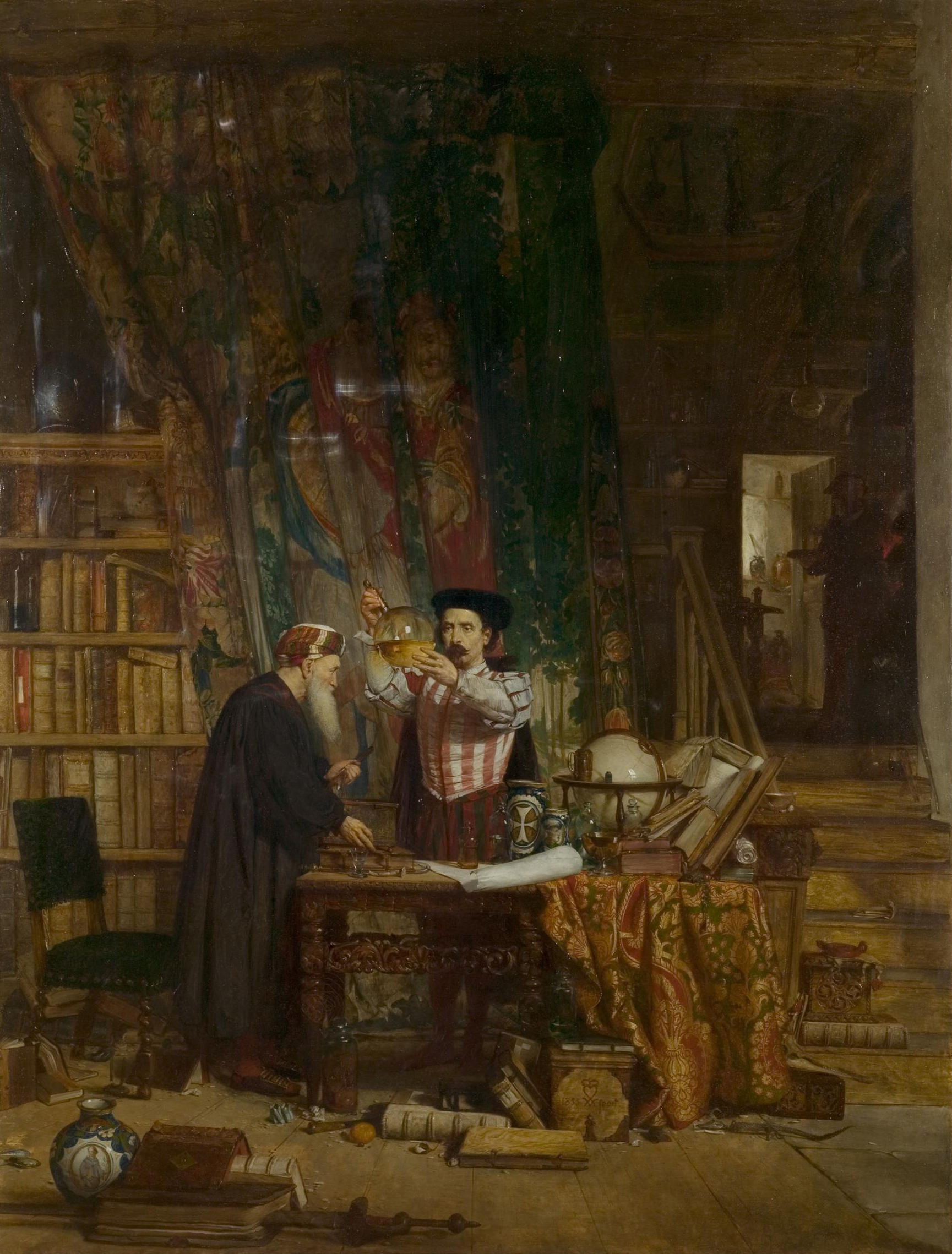
The Alchemist by William Fettes Douglas (1853): studying for arcane knowledge

In JK Rowling's Harry Potter series, wizards already possess innate magic abilities, but require enrollment in Wizarding Schools in order to develop their skills and practice magic properly. Harry Potter popularized the “magic school” setting, but it is common enough to occur in settings where magic is instead a learned talent involving the study of ancient texts or mastery of magic tools. Ancient tomes such as grimoires fit both niches, as they often have magical properties of their own. Sorcerers in Conan the Barbarian often gained powers from such books, demarcated by their strange bindings, and the scarcity of these strange books may be a facet of the story. This can also be seen in Poul Anderson's A Midsummer Tempest, where Prince Rupert seeks out the books of the magician Prospero to learn magic, and the Dungeons and Dragons-based novel series Dragonlance Chronicles, wherein Raistlin Majere seeks out the books of the sorcerer Fistandantilus.

Some magicians, even after training, continue their education by learning more spells, inventing new ones (and new magical objects), or rediscovering ancient spells, beings, or objects. For example, Dr. Strange from the Marvel Universe continues to learn about magic even after being named Sorcerer Supreme. He often encounters creatures that have not been seen for centuries or more. In the same universe, Dr. Doom continues to pursue magical knowledge after mastering it by combining magic with science. Fred and George Weasley from Harry Potter invent new magical items and sell them as legitimate defense items, new spells and potions can be made in the Harry Potter Universe; Severus Snape invented a variety of jinxes and hexes as well as substantial improvements in the process of making potions; Albus Dumbledore, along with Nicolas Flamel, is credited with discovering the twelve uses of dragon's blood.

== Limits on magic ==
To introduce conflict, writers of fantasy fiction often place limits on the magical abilities of magicians to prevent them from solving problems too easily.

A common motif in fiction is that the ability to use magic is innate and often rare, or gained through a large amount of study and practice. In J. R. R. Tolkien's Middle-earth, magic is mostly limited to non-humans, such as the Istari (more commonly known as wizards), or elves crafting magical items. In many writers' works, it is reserved for a select group of humans, such as in Katherine Kurtz's Deryni novels, JK Rowling's Harry Potter novels or Randall Garrett's Lord Darcy universe.

A common limit invented by Jack Vance in his The Dying Earth series, and later popularized in role-playing games is that a wizard can only cast a specific number of spells in a day. In Larry Niven's The Magic Goes Away, once an area's mana is exhausted, no one can use magic.

The extent of a magician's knowledge is limited to which spells a wizard knows and can cast. Magic may also be limited by its danger; if a powerful spell can cause grave harm if miscast, magicians are likely to be wary of using it. Other forms of magic are limited by consequences that, while not inherently dangerous, are at least undesirable. In A Wizard of Earthsea, every act of magic distorts the equilibrium of the world, which in turn has far-reaching consequences that can affect the entire world and everything in it. As a result, competent wizards do not use their magic frivolously.

In Terry Pratchett's Discworld series, the Law of Conservation of Reality is a principle imposed by forces wanting wizards to not destroy the world, and works to limit how much power it is humanly possible to wield. Whatever your means, the effort put into reaching the ends stays the same. For example, when the wizards of Unseen University are chasing the hapless wizard Rincewind in the forest of Skund, the wizards send out search teams to go and find him on foot. The Archchancellor beats them to it by using a powerful spell from his own office, and while he gets there first by clever use of his spell, he has used no less effort than the others.

Magic may require rare and precious materials, such as rare herbs or flowers (often selected by prescribed rituals), minerals or metals such as mercury, parts of creatures such as the eye of a newt, or even fantastic ingredients like the cool of a soft breeze on a summer's day. Even if the magician lacks scruples, obtaining the materials in question may be difficult. This can vary by fantasy work. Many magicians require no materials at all; or those that do may require only simple and easily obtained materials. Role-playing games are more likely to require such materials for at least some spells for game balance reasons.

== Use of magic in society ==
Nevertheless, many magicians live in pseudo-medieval settings in which their magic is not put to practical use in society; they may serve as mentors, act as quest companions, or even go on a quest themselves, but their magic does not build roads or buildings, provide immunizations, construct indoor plumbing, or do any of the other functions served by machinery; their worlds remain at a medieval level of technology.

Sometimes this is justified by having the negative effects of magic outweigh the positive possibilities. In Barbara Hambley's Windrose Chronicles, wizards are precisely pledged not to interfere because of the terrible damage they can do. In Discworld, the importance of wizards is that they actively do not do magic, because when wizards have access to sufficient "thaumaturgic energy", they develop many psychotic attributes and may eventually destroy the world. This may be a direct effect or the result of a miscast spell wreaking terrible havoc.

In other works, developing magic is difficult. In Rick Cook's Wizardry series, the extreme danger presented by magic and the difficulty of analyzing the magic have stymied magic and left humanity at the mercy of the dangerous elves until a wizard summons a computer programmer from a parallel world — ours — to apply the skills he learned in our world to magic.

At other times, magic and technology do develop in tandem; this is most common in the alternate history genre. Patricia Wrede's Regency fantasies include a Royal Society of Wizards and a technological level equivalent to the actual Regency; Randall Garrett's Lord Darcy series, Robert A. Heinlein's Magic, Incorporated, and Poul Anderson's Operation Chaos all depict modern societies with magic equivalent to twentieth-century technology. In Harry Potter, wizards have magical equivalents to non-magical inventions; sometimes they duplicate them, as with the Hogwarts Express train.

The powers ascribed to magicians often affect their roles in society. In practical terms, their powers may give them authority; magicians may advise kings, such as Gandalf in The Lord of the Rings and Belgarath and Polgara the Sorceress in David Eddings's The Belgariad. They may be rulers themselves, as in E.R. Eddison's The Worm Ouroboros, where both the heroes and the villains, although kings and lords, supplement their physical power with magical knowledge, or as in Jonathan Stroud's Bartimaeus Trilogy, where magicians are the governing class. On the other hand, magicians often live like hermits, isolated in their towers and often in the wilderness, bringing no change to society. In some works, such as many of Barbara Hambly's, they are despised and outcast specifically because of their knowledge and powers.

In the magic-noir world of the Dresden Files, wizards generally keep a low profile, though there is no explicit prohibition against interacting openly with non-magical humanity. The protagonist of the series, Harry Dresden, openly advertises in the Yellow Pages under the heading "Wizard" and maintains a business office, though other wizards tend to resent him for practicing his craft openly. Dresden primarily uses his magic to make a living finding lost items and people, performing exorcisms, and providing protection against the supernatural.

In the series Sorcerous Stabber Orphen, human forms of life should have only been capable of acquiring divine magic powers through individual spiritual development, whereas the race of human magicians with inborn magical ability ended in conflict with pureblood human society, because this race appeared as a result of an experiment of mixing humans with non-human sentient Heavenly Beings that acquired magic powers not through spiritual development, but through deep studying of laws of nature and by falsely causing the world's laws to react to actions of the Heavenly Beings as to actions of Divinities. In the Harry Potter series, the Wizarding World hides themselves from the rest of the non-magic world, because, as described by Hagrid simply, "Why? Blimey, Harry, everyone’d be wantin’ magic solutions to their problems. Nah, we’re best left alone.”
