= Belgarath the Sorcerer =

1995 book by David Eddings

- Author: David Eddings and Leigh Eddings
- Language: English
- Genre: Fantasy
- Publisher: Del Rey Books
- Publication date: 1995
- Publication place: United States
- Media type: Print (Hardback & Paperback)
- Pages: 736 (paperback)
- ISBN: 0-345-40395-9
- OCLC: 34873399

Belgarath the Sorcerer is a fantasy novel by American writers David Eddings and Leigh Eddings. Set in the same universe as the Eddings' The Belgariad and The Malloreon, it is a prequel to the other series, although the framework story is set after the events of The Malloreon.

The novel begins shortly after the end of The Malloreon with Belgarion, with help from Durnik, pestering Belgarath to write an autobiographical account of the events prior to The Belgariad. The core of the book is in the form of Belgarath's memoirs starting with his becoming an outcast from his village and becoming first disciple of the god Aldur and ending with the birth of Belgarion—a span of about seven thousand years.

Polgara the Sorceress is a companion book to Belgarath the Sorcerer which form the memoirs of Belgarath's elder daughter, Polgara.
