= Polgara the Sorceress =

Book by David Eddings

- First edition book cover
- Author: David Eddings
- Language: English
- Genre: Fantasy
- Publisher: Del Rey Books
- Publication date: 1997
- Publication place: United States
- Media type: Print (Hardback & Paperback)
- Pages: 768 (paperback)
- ISBN: 0-345-42255-4
- OCLC: 40563303

Polgara the Sorceress is a fantasy novel by American writers David and Leigh Eddings, and the twelfth in the setting of The Belgariad, The Malloreon and Belgarath the Sorcerer. Like the latter novel, it is presented as a first-person narrative recounting the life of the eponymous character, Polgara, framed by a prologue and epilogue in the third person placing it in context relative to the earlier stories. The fictional character of Polgara is the (many generations removed) aunt of Belgarion and the daughter of Belgarath.

== Plot summary ==
Polgara the Sorceress begins with Ce'Nedra entreating Polgara to write a book about her life, filling in the gaps left by her father's story, Belgarath the Sorcerer. The main part of the story thus begins, revealing that Polgara and her twin sister Beldaran were raised by their adoptive uncles, the deformed Beldin and the twin sorcerers Beltira and Belkira (all disciples of Aldur, like Belgarath), after the apparent death of their mother, Poledra. Their mother was a shape-shifting wolf at birth; she was distressed that her human babies would be born deficient in lupine instinct, and therefore educated them telepathically prior to parturition. After the birth of the twins, Poledra was presumed to have died; but continued communication with Polgara.

For many years, Polgara resented her father's long absence from her own upbringing; and when Belgarath resumed care of his daughters, Beldaran was quick to forgive him but Polgara often fled to the Tree at the center of the Vale of Aldur, where she learned to speak to birds and ultimately mastered the Will and the Word. Belgarath (with Beldaran's help) eventually negotiated an uneasy peace, and Polgara began her training under him. Following Beldaran's marriage, Polgara also resented the "loss" of her sister; but the shared loss eventually reconciled her to Belgarath. Over the years, she maintained a relationship with the descendants of Beldaran.

A relatively young Polgara spent many years in the Arendish duchy of Vo Wacune, where she mitigated the Arendish civil wars. Ultimately she was proclaimed the "Duchess of Erat". When Vo Wacune was destroyed, Erat became part of the new kingdom of Sendaria. When the Rivan King (Beldaran's descendant) was assassinated, Polgara became the guardian of a secret line of surviving heirs, incognito in Sendaria and its neighboring domains. At the Battle of Vo Mimbre, Polgara learned that in the prophecies of her enemies, she was the intended bride of the dark god Torak, whom she therefore defied at each meeting. Following Torak's defeat at Vo Mimbre, Polgara returned to caring for the descendants of Riva, eventually raising Garion.

== See also ==
- Pawn of Prophecy (1982)
- Queen of Sorcery (1982)
- Magician's Gambit (1983)
- Castle of Wizardry (1984)
- Enchanters' End Game (1984)
