= The Malloreon =

Fantasy book series by David Eddings

- Guardians of the West; King of the Murgos; Demon Lord of Karanda; Sorceress of Darshiva; The Seeress of Kell
- Author: David Eddings; Leigh Eddings (uncredited)
- Country: United States
- Language: English
- Genre: High fantasy
- Publisher: Del Rey Books
- Published: 1987–1991
- Media type: Hardcover, Paperback
- No. of books: 5
- Preceded by: The Belgariad

The Malloreon is a five-part fantasy book series written by David Eddings, which follows The Belgariad. The Malloreon is set in the same world as The Belgariad, but expands on several aspects of the setting, especially the eastern continent of Mallorea.

== Works in the series ==
1. Guardians of the West (ISBN 0-345-35266-1)
2. King of the Murgos (ISBN 0-345-35880-5)
3. Demon Lord of Karanda (ISBN 0-345-36331-0)
4. Sorceress of Darshiva (ISBN 0-345-36935-1)
5. Seeress of Kell (ISBN 0-345-37759-1)

While the story concludes in The Malloreon, minor events occur in the prequels Belgarath the Sorcerer and Polgara the Sorceress, which otherwise cover the history of the world.

=== Guardians of the West ===
Guardians of the West
- Author: David Eddings
- Illustrator: Shelly Shapiro
- Cover artist: Edwin Herder
- Language: English
- Series: The Malloreon
- Genre: Fantasy
- Publisher: Del Rey Books
- Publication date: 04/1987
- Publication place: United States
- Media type: Print ( )
- Pages: 438 (paperback)
- ISBN: 0-345-33000-5
- OCLC: 17609325
- Followed by: King of the Murgos

At the end of The Belgariad, Garion has slain the evil god Torak and expects lasting peace. The first half of the book concentrates on the first eight years of Belgarion's reign, describing minor problems including Queen Ce'Nedra's seeming infertility and a civil war in Arendia. All of these problems are resolved without much trouble, their resolutions providing some comic relief. The book also depicts the life of Errand, Polgara's ward. During his years under her care, Errand displays near-omniscience; this puzzles Polgara and Belgarath. During the same years, Errand encounters a lesson learned telepathically from an ancient tree and two contacts with people important to his destiny. The inciting action of the story occurs when Garion and Errand are both summoned by the Orb of Aldur, and the Voice of Prophecy warns them "Beware Zandramas!". Thereafter Garion and Belgarath seek to discover the identity and purpose of Zandramas through records of ancient, dubious prophecies. Ultimately, Garion learns that he is still a figure of prophecy and bears the responsibility of defeating Torak's successor, the "Child of Dark".

Subsequent to Garion's discovery, his regent Brand is murdered by assassins sent to kill Ce'Nedra and her newborn son Geran. The assassins are traced to the Bear-Cult, a legion of ethnocentric fanatics dedicated to reunification of the empire divided among the sons of Garion's ancestor King Cherek. In response, Garion and other descendants of Cherek destroy the Bear-Cult, but are unable to prevent the abduction of Prince Geran. When the cult rising is put down, it is revealed that the leader of the cultists is the priest/sorcerer Harakan, a servant of Torak's disciple Urvon. Harakan escapes shortly after the revelation of his true identity.

The military leaders are later visited by the clairvoyant Cyradis, who reveals that Geran's kidnapping was carried out by Zandramas, the new Child of Dark, and that Garion must recover him with the help of Belgarath, Polgara, Ce'Nedra, Errand, Durnik, and Silk; but shall later acquire the Huntress (a Drasnian spy named Liselle or Velvet), the Man Who Is No Man (the eunuch Sadi), the Empty One (Mallorean Emperor Zakath), the Silent Man (Cyradis' bodyguard Toth) and the Woman Who Watches (Belgarath's wife Poledra). With these companions he must travel to the Place Which Is No More for the final meeting between Light and Dark that will decide the fate of the world. When all objections are overcome, the company assembles and departs.

=== King of the Murgos ===
King of the Murgos
- Author: David Eddings
- Illustrator: Shelly Shapiro
- Cover artist: Edwin Herder
- Language: English
- Series: The Malloreon
- Genre: Fantasy
- Publisher: Del Rey Books
- Publication date: 04/1988
- Publication place: United States
- Media type: Print ( )
- Pages: 458 (hard cover)
- ISBN: 0-345-33002-1
- Preceded by: Guardians of the West
- Followed by: Demon Lord of Karanda

In this book, Belgarion and his fellow travelers learn more about the murderous woman Zandramas and of her minion, a white-eyed Angarak named Naradas. During their stay in Nyissa they recruit Sadi, a eunuch expelled from Queen Salmissra's court. Sadi convinces the group to pose as slavers searching for escaped runaways as the Mallorean army ravages Cthol Murgos. When they enter the wastelands of Cthol Murgos, they are captured by the desert-dwelling Dagashi and given the task of secreting an assassin through the Mallorean army lines. Eventually, they arrive in the palace of the King of the Murgos, Urgit, and discover, to Kheldar's surprise, that his father had sired the Murgo King while on a diplomatic mission many years before.

Urgit, upon learning that Kheldar is his half-brother, arranges for the group to travel south to the Isle of Verkat. Before they leave the city, they find that the Dagashi assassin is in fact Harakan. Garion and Harakan duel with swords until Harakan realizes he is about to lose and resorts to sorcery to save himself. The group then sails south. En route, their ship wrecks and they must travel to the coast on foot. On the coast, Toth tells them that Cyradis has arranged a boat to take them to the island. On the island, they are directed to Ashaba, Torak's ruined castle. Before they can leave the island, Mallorean soldiers come looking for them, and Cyradis, who must abet both Necessities equally, tells Toth to alert the guards to their presence. The book ends with the company being sent to Emperor Zakath's Imperial Stronghold.

=== Demon Lord of Karanda ===
Demon Lord of Karanda
- Author: David Eddings
- Illustrator: Shelly Shapiro
- Cover artist: Edwin Herder
- Language: English
- Series: The Malloreon
- Genre: Fantasy
- Publisher: Del Rey Books
- Publication date: 09/1988
- Publication place: United States
- Media type: Print ( )
- Pages: 426 (hard cover)
- ISBN: 0-345-33004-8
- Preceded by: King of the Murgos
- Followed by: Sorceress of Darshiva

At the beginning of this chapter, Belgarion and his fellow travellers are brought to Mallorea. There Belgarion meets Kal Zakath, the Mallorean emperor bent on destroying the Murgos' royal family. Gradually, Zakath and Garion become friends. When a sudden plague spreads, necessitating quarantine, the questing party escape the city so as to continue their journey. In escape, they are joined by the jester Feldegast (actually Belgarath's 'brother' Beldin in disguise), with whom they approach Ashaba. Problems arise when they confirm the report of demons under the Demon Lord Nahaz, who has turned the sorcerer Urvon insane.

Reaching Ashaba, Garion is tricked into believing that he sees Zandramas and his son meeting with Urvon and charges into the throne room. Beldin, on seeing Urvon and his man Harakan, assumes his true form; this starts a battle with Urvon's forces, which ultimately results in Harakan's death. Nahaz faces the group of sorcerers and the Orb, ready to fight; but when Eriond comes to stand with Garion, the Demon Lord flees, carrying Urvon with him. The group then continues east. Travelling through the demon-infested countryside, and seeing horrors such as women impregnated by demons (the births usually resulting in the mother's death), the group encounters Zandramas, who attempts to coerce Ce'Nedra within killing distance, until Poledra, Polgara's mother and Belgarath's wife, forces Zandramas to retreat.

=== Sorceress of Darshiva ===
Sorceress of Darshiva
- Author: David Eddings
- Illustrator: Shelly Shapiro
- Cover artist: Edwin Herder
- Language: English
- Series: The Malloreon
- Genre: Fantasy
- Publisher: Del Rey Books
- Publication date: 12/1989
- Publication place: United States
- Media type: Print ( )
- Pages: 410 (hard cover)
- ISBN: 0-345-33005-6
- Preceded by: Demon Lord of Karanda
- Followed by: Seeress of Kell

The party enters the Melcene Empire, where they discover that the Sardion, the moral opposite of the Orb of Aldur, was once kept in an undersea cave where traces of its power still resonate. Upon reaching the University at Melcena, Belgarath finds an unmutilated copy of the Ashabine Oracles, which he has sought, and decides that the party must go to Kell to learn of the location of "The Place That Is No More". Garion, in the same book, sees that in his sole moment of sanity, Torak specifically addressed Belgarion, demanding that if need be he should destroy the world, even kill his own son, rather than let Zandramas complete her plans. This reflects a similar warning made by Cyradis in Guardians of the West. Having achieved this knowledge, the group return to Mallorea and travel overland. At some point thereafter, a suggestion is made that Torak's existence was an aberration and that another God shall appear to take his place.

The party is recaptured by Zakath, who threatens to take Garion back to Mal Zeth with his companions as collateral. At Beldin's request, Cyradis persuades him to release the party, offering herself as a hostage; Zakath does so and joins their quest. Shortly thereafter, Poledra joins them in the guise of a wolf, bringing an orphaned cub later domesticated by Ce'Nedra. Her identity is concealed from both characters and reader until the next book.

Urvon's Karand army under Nahaz and Zandramas' Darshivan army eventually engage each other in battle, as do Urvon's Demon Lord Nahaz and Zandramas' Demon Lord Mordja. The demons go after Garion's group, sensing the Orb's presence, but Aldur infuses Durnik with his own powers, and he defeats and banishes Nahaz. Aldur, before leaving, informs Belgarath, Beldin, and Polgara that Durnik is "also my beloved Disciple, as he was the best suited of ye". An amulet shaped in the likeness of a sledgehammer (the only one made by Aldur without the aid of Belgarath) is then bestowed upon the smith.

=== Seeress of Kell ===
Seeress of Kell
- Author: David Eddings
- Illustrator: Shelly Shapiro
- Cover artist: Edwin Herder
- Language: English
- Series: The Malloreon
- Genre: Fantasy
- Publisher: Del Rey Books
- Publication date: 05/1991
- Publication place: United States
- Media type: Print ( )
- Pages: 402 (hard cover)
- ISBN: 0-345-33006-4
- Preceded by: Sorceress of Darshiva

The group continues to Kell, where they meet with Cyradis. As promised, the Seeress surrenders herself to Zakath, and directs the others to Perivor, an island to the southwest of the Mallorean continent. Garion's party and Zandramas's servant Naradas attempt to find maps in Perivor, a kingdom of shipwrecked Mimbrates, that point the way to the Place Which Is No More. Naradas, disguised as a court minister, delays Garion with red-herring quests, whereafter Sadi poisons him. With the aid of a Necromancer, they expose his treachery to the King and find an ancient map on which Place Which is No More is the 'High Places of Korim', an ancient temple of Torak. There, they confront Zandramas. A battle ensues against her Grolim priests, as well as the demon Mordja. Mordja kills the blindfolded Seeress's guide Toth; but Garion slays the demon with his ancestral sword.

The group then accompanies Zandramas into the Sardion's resting place, where Zandramas chooses Geran as the next Child of Dark, whereupon Garion chooses Eriond as the next Child of Light. Cyradis, still grieving over the loss of Toth and unable to consult her people, is terrified of making the wrong choice, until Polgara removes her blindfold. Receiving a final challenge from Zandramas, Cyradis ultimately chooses Eriond, whereupon Zandramas and the Sardion are changed into stars and transported into outer space.

The Voice of Prophecy explains that the events of the preceding books were the result of an ancient 'accident' in space, that resulted in the Light and Dark prophecies, and that Eriond, the final Child of the Light, is now the God of Angarak. Zakath's personal guard soon arrives on the Imperial ship. In the harbor, Barak, Lelldorin, Mandorallen, and Hettar arrive in Barak's ship, with Barak's son Unrak tied to the ship's mast. Here, it is revealed that Unrak is his father's successor to the position of the Rivan King's guardian, the Dreadful Bear. The sorcerers honor the fallen Toth by populating his funeral slab with eternally growing flowers and sealing off the section of Mount Korim with glowing quartz as his tomb.

After leaving Eriond, Zakath, and Cyradis, the adventurers return home in Barak's ship, where it is revealed that both Ce'Nedra and Polgara are pregnant. The story ends with Garion reading a letter from Zakath, showing that Zakath has now married Cyradis and is witness to the social changes wrought by Eriond, while Garion, Belgarath, and Durnik are in the Vale of Aldur, as Polgara gives birth to twins. This birth is theorized as the first "new" event in their world's history.

== See also ==
- Characters in The Belgariad
- Deities in The Belgariad
- Races in The Belgariad and The Malloreon
- The Rivan Codex
