= High Hunt =

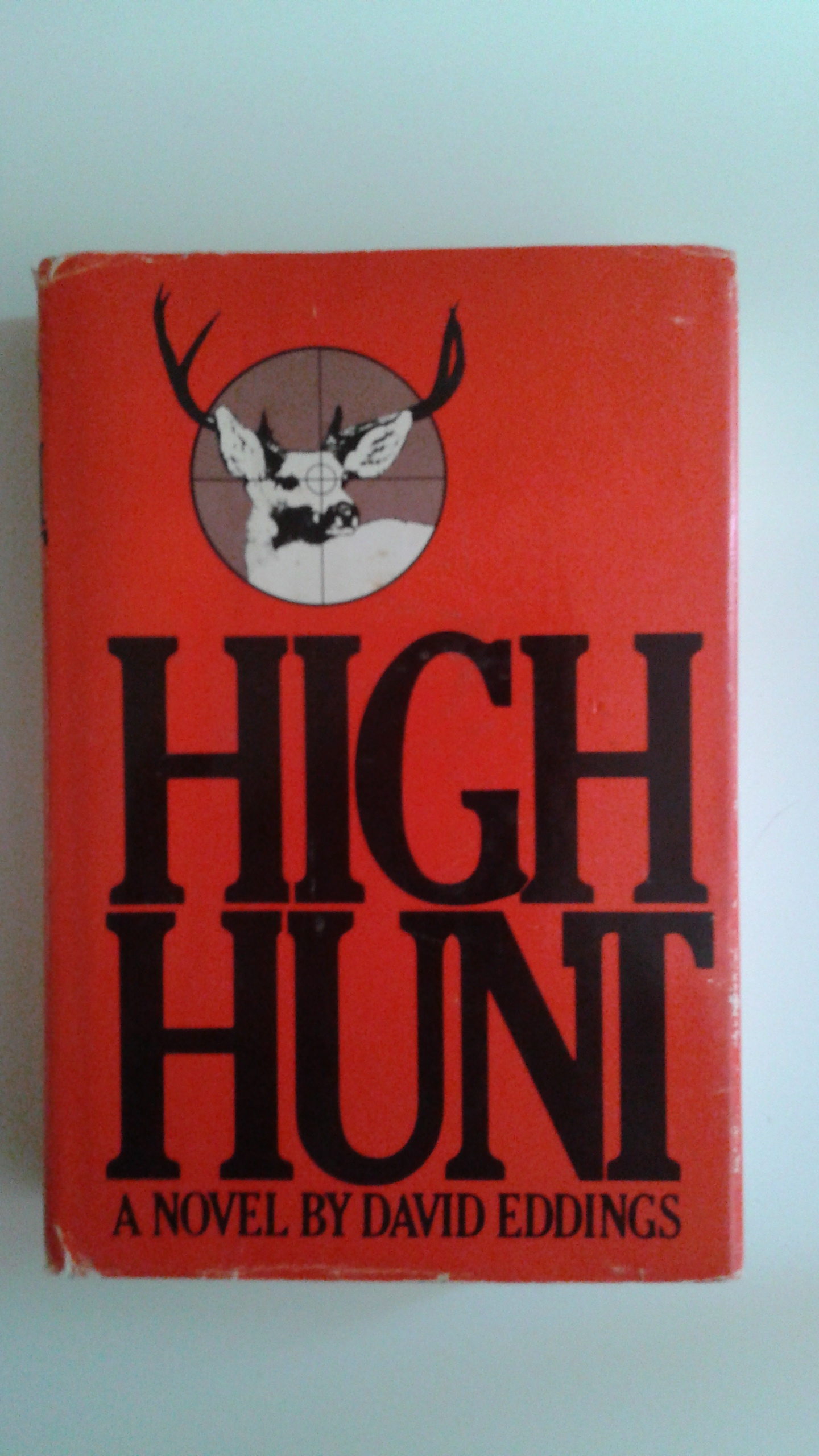
- Hardback edition of High Hunt, 1973
- Author: David Eddings
- Cover artist: One Plus Media
- Language: English
- Genre: Fiction/Suspense
- Publisher: G.P. Putnam's Sons
- Publication date: 1973
- Publication place: United States
- Media type: Hardcover, Paperback, Kindle
- Pages: 384 pp (Hardback)
- ISBN: 9780006475934 (newer edition)

High Hunt is the first published novel of David Eddings. It was first published in 1973 by G. P. Putnam's Sons, its copyright was renewed and it published in New York by HarperCollins in 1993, and then in 1994 by Del Rey Books. High Hunt is Eddings' first novel, written while he was serving jail time for a child abuse charge. High Hunt was one of only two "mainstream novels" he wrote during his career. While it is not fantasy, as are most of Eddings' other books, it still shares similarities with most of them as the book focuses on the main character maturing, falling in love, and overcoming personal tragedy. The story is written from the first person perspective though the eyes of Dan Alders, a soldier back from army duty in Germany and on a hunting trip with his estranged brother Jack and some "friends": Cal, Lou, and Stan. The theme of the returning soldier was also in Eddings' novel How Lovely are the Dead (1953) submitted as his undergraduate thesis at Reed College and later his own experience returning from service in Germany. During the hunt, tensions and old hatreds rise and escalate into open fighting. The story takes place in the Cascade Mountains, in Washington state, U.S.

== Plot ==
The prologue begins the story by introducing the characters of Dan and Jack as children as their father tells them a story.

== Reception and reviews ==
While this book is generally rated lesser in comparison to Eddings' later and more popular works, it has nonetheless enjoyed modest popularity, though this is largely by Eddings fans who see it to be a welcome break from the general fantasy offerings of the author. The story is generally well received on Amazon with fair ratings (as of July 2015) on Goodreads, though many readers comment that the dated language and descriptions detract from the enjoyment of the book. Those who strongly praise the book do so for its honest representation of mankind and its vivid descriptions of the mountain settings.

== Sources ==
Teehan, John D. "Eddings, David 1931–." Supernatural Fiction Writers: Contemporary Fantasy and Horror. Ed. Richard Bleiler. 2nd ed. Vol. 1. New York: Charles Scribner's Sons, 2003. 323-330. Scribner Writers on GVRL. Web. 29 Oct. 2014.
