= List of The Belgariad and The Malloreon characters =

This is a list of The Belgariad and The Malloreon characters. The Belgariad and The Malloreon are two parts of a fantasy epic written by David Eddings and Leigh Eddings. Note: All of the statements (deceased, married) are written from the information by the end of the series.

== Protagonists ==
Note: These characters are the main protagonists to the story. There are many other minor and supporting protagonists, including some royalty.

- Garion (later Belgarion), the main protagonist of the story and later the King of Riva, with the titles of Overlord of the West, Lord of the Western Sea, and Godslayer. Husband of Ce'Nedra, father of Geran and Beldaran (named after Polgara's deceased sister). Garion is called the "Child of Light" in the Mrin Codex and the Darine Codex. (Note: he is not the only Child of Light; that is a position passed from individual to individual. At one point it is Belgarath; at another, Poledra; and finally, Eriond.)
- Belgarath the Sorcerer, first disciple of the god Aldur and husband of Poledra. Ancestor and mentor of Belgarion. Belgarath is called the "Eternal Man", "Ancient One", and "Eternal and Beloved" in the Mrin Codex. One of the first users of the Will and the Word. The first of the prequels to The Belgariad is Belgarath the Sorcerer, a biography of Belgarath.
- Polgara, daughter of Belgarath and Poledra, twin sister of Beldaran, called the Aunt of Belgarion. She is a sorceress, at one time the Dutchess of Erat, and one of the prequels written for The Belgariad is Polgara the Sorceress, which is a biography of Polgara.
- Durnik (sometimes known as Beldurnik), a Sendarian blacksmith at Faldor's farm and later husband of Polgara. Durnik is called the "Man with Two Lives" in the Mrin Codex because he would be resurrected by Garion, with the help of the Orb of Aldur and all the Gods present at Torak's death. He is Aldur's last disciple.
- Barak, Earl of Trellheim, cousin of King Anheg "the Sly" of Cherek. Barak is called the "Dreadful Bear" in the Mrin Codex, and transforms into a bear whenever Garion is in imminent danger.
- Silk, or Prince Kheldar of Drasnia, called the "Guide", the "Rat" and the "Thief" in the Mrin Codex. He is a skilled spy, merchant, thief, and acrobat. He is sharp-witted and cynical. Despite his status as a 'notorious bachelor' throughout the Belgariad, he eventually marries his fellow spy Velvet (Margravine Liselle).
- Ce'Nedra, Imperial Princess of Tolnedra; later the wife of Garion and Queen of Riva. Ce'Nedra is called the "Queen of the World" and the "Bride of Light" in the Mrin Codex. Later the mother of Geran and Beldaran.
- Eriond (previously Errand), a boy sent by the Prophecy to be used by Zedar to steal the Orb of Aldur. Later the adopted son of Durnik and Polgara. Became the new Child of Light and then the new God of the Angaraks. Called the 'Bearer Of The Orb' by the Dals. After Torak's death and Eriond's ascension to godhood, he would be the new God of the Angaraks.
- Hettar, foster-son to King Cho-Hag of Algaria and later husband of Garion's cousin Adara. Hettar is called the "Horse Lord" in the Mrin Codex due to his ability to communicate with horses. This ability earns him the title "Sha-Dar".
- Lelldorin, son of the Baron of Wildantor and later husband of Ariana. Lelldorin is called the "Archer" in the Mrin Codex. Friend of Belgarion.
- Mandorallen, Baron of Vo Mandor, husband of the Baroness Nerina, champion to Princess Ce'Nedra. Mandorallen is called the "Knight Protector" in the Mrin Codex.
- Relg, an Ulgo diviner and zealot. Later the husband of Taiba of Maragor. Relg is called the "Blind Man" in the Mrin Codex because of his home in the caves of Ulgo. He has the ability to walk through solid rock, and is extremely devoted to his God, UL.
- Taiba, a Marag slave. Later the wife of Relg. Taiba is called the "Mother of the Race that Died" in the Mrin Codex, for she is the last Marag alive and the ancestor of all subsequent inhabitants of Maragor. She is sharp-tongued.
- Velvet, (real name Margravine Liselle). Known in the Mrin Codex as "The Huntress". Velvet is the niece of the Head of Drasnian Intelligence, Margrave Khendon (Javelin), and a resourceful Drasian spy herself, despite her demure appearance, with secrets even from Silk, whom she ultimately seduces and marries.
- Sadi, Chief Eunuch to Queen Salmissra. Sadi is called the "Man who is no Man" in the Mrin Codex. An accomplished apothecary with a large stock of chemicals, drugs, poisons, and a very small venomous snake named Zith, he was Chief Enunch of Salmissra's household and the functional ruler of Nyissa.
- Poledra, wife to Belgarath, mother of the twins Polgara and Beldaran, ancestress of Belgarion. Poledra is called the "Woman Who Watches" in the Mrin Codex. Originally a wolf who learned to take human form after observing Belgarath.
- Zakath, Emperor of Mallorea, companion of Belgarion, and husband of Cyradis, the Seeress of Kell. Zakath is called the "Empty One" in the Mrin Codex. He originally claimed a title translating to 'God' and desired power, but his adventures with Garion made him a more humble monarch.
- Toth (deceased), mute guide to the Seeress Cyradis. He is known as the "Silent Man" in the prophecy of the Dals.

== Antagonists ==
Note: This section includes the three disciples of Torak, along with other major antagonists in the story.

- Agachak (deceased): Grolim High Priest of Cthol Murgos in the Malloreon. A co-conspirator in King Urgit's scheme to eliminate Zakath. Eaten by Zandramas.
- Asharak (deceased - real name Chamdar): Killer of Garion's parents; killed by Garion.
- Brill (deceased - real name Kordoch): An assassin charged with disrupting Garion's quest. Killed by Silk.
- Chabat (banished): a Grolim priestess and magician. Faced Polgara and Aldur, who banished her to Hell.
- Ctuchik (annihilated): disciple and high priest of Torak. Destroyed himself in the attempt to annihilate the Orb of Aldur.
- Dark Prophecy (overcome): Motive force against the protagonists, most of the Gods, and the Light Prophecy. Has possessed, in order: Torak (the long-time Child of Dark), an ancient Karand (first discoverer of the Sardion, eventually left in the hidden underwater cove), an early Melcene Emperor (the Sardion's transfer to Melcena), a scholar from the University of Melcene (to carry the Sardion to the Place Which Is No More), Zandramas (the new Child of Dark, upon Torak's demise), and finally Geran, Belgarion's son (the final Child of Dark).
- Harakan (deceased; also known as Ulfgar and Mengha): Grolim priest and Urvon's underling. Summoned the demon lord Nahaz, headed the Bear-Cult, and was killed by Zith, a small, deadly snake.
- Mordja (banished / poss. deceased): Totem Demon of the Morindim. Fought with Nahaz in the valley near Kell and fled from the power infused into Durnik by the God Aldur. Zandramas enticed the Demon Lord into the form of the last surviving dragon. He and his dragon host were slain by Belgarion.
- Nahaz, Demon Lord (banished): Entranced Urvon into insanity. Made a bid for either the Orb or the Sardion, but was banished by Durnik.
- Naradas (deceased): right-hand man of Zandramas. Grolim priest. His eyes are entirely white, but he is not blind. Poisoned by Sadi.
- Torak (deceased): God of Angarak. One of the seven deities who created the world. Torak prefers to be called Kal Torak ("Kal" meaning "King and God"). Slain by Belgarion.
- Urvon (deceased): disciple of Torak. Object of Beldin's endless loathing, and head of the Mallorean Church of Torak. Brought to insanity and dragged into Hell by Nahaz.
- Zandramas (metamorphosed): the Child of Dark after the death of Torak, previously a Grolim priestess. Main antagonist of the Malloreon. Changed at the climax thereof into a cluster of stars.
- Zedar (Belzedar; buried alive): disciple of Torak, but formerly a disciple of Aldur. For the change in his allegiance, Zedar is also called the Apostate. Encased alive in stone by Belgarath.

== Royalty ==
- Belgarion: King of Riva, Lord of the Western Sea, Godslayer, Overlord of the West, husband of Ce'Nedra, and father of Geran and Beldaran II.
- Ce'Nedra: Queen of Riva and Imperial Princess of Tolnedra, wife of Belgarion, and mother of Geran and Beldaran II.
- Anheg: King of Cherek, husband of Islena, and cousin of Barak.
- Islena: Queen of Cherek, and wife of Anheg.
- Cho-Hag: King of Algaria, husband of Silar, and foster-father of Hettar.
- Silar: Queen of Algaria, wife of Cho-Hag, and foster-mother of Hettar.
- Drosta lek Thun: King of Gar og Nadrak.
- Fulrach: King of Sendaria, and husband of Layla.
- Layla: Queen of Sendaria, and wife of Fulrach.
- Gethel (deceased): King of Mishrak Ac Thull; replaced by his son, Nathel.
- Korodullin: King of Arendia, and husband of Mayaserana.
- Mayaserana: Queen of Arendia, and wife of Korodullin.
- Rhodar (deceased by obesity and heart failure): King of Drasnia, husband of Porenn, father of Kheva, and uncle of Silk.
- Porenn, Queen of Drasnia, wife of Rhodar, mother and regent of Kheva, and aunt by marriage of Silk.
- Kheva: son of Rhodar and Porenn, ascends the throne at the age of six upon Rhodar's death, under the regency of his mother and with the blessing of Garion and the neighboring Monarchs.
- Kheldar (Silk): Drasnian spy; the heir to the Drasnian throne before the birth of Kheva, nephew of Rhodar
- Salmissra: Queen of Nyissa; changed into an immortal snake by Polgara.
- Ran Borune XXIII (deceased by old age): Emperor of Tolnedra, and father of Ce'Nedra.
- Varana: Duke of Anadile; a Tolnedran general. Proclaimed heir by Emperor Ran Borune, he takes the throne upon the death of the Emperor, proclaiming himself Ran Borune XXIV.
- Taur Urgas (killed in action): Former King of Cthol Murgos; died in a duel with King Cho-Hag of Algaria.
- Urgit: King of Cthol Murgos after the death of Taur Urgas, his legal father. Genetically the son of Silk's father through Lady Tamazin, one of Taur Urgas' wives.
- Gorim: High Priest of Ulgoland. His name belongs only to his office; he has no personal name.
- Zakath: Emperor of Mallorea, husband of Cyradis.
- Cyradis: Empress of Mallorea, wife of Zakath; former Seeress of Kell.

== Disciples of Aldur ==
- Beldin, the Dwarf. Ethnicity unknown beneath his extreme deformities. Very intelligent and powerful; hinted to be the most intelligent and powerful of Aldur's disciples. Discovered shape-shifting. Changed into a hawk, alongside his new wife Vella, at the end of the series.
- Belgarath, called "The Ancient" or "Eternal Man". First disciple of Aldur. Father of Polgara and Beldaran. One of the main characters throughout both series and preceding books. Easily irritable and mischievous, but extremely clever, a great teacher, and an excellent if reluctant leader. Frequently assumes the form of a wolf.
- Belkira, an Alorn shepherd. Twin of Beltira. A gentle disciple, who enjoys cooking. He and his brother discovered telepathy.
- Beltira, an Alorn shepherd. Twin of Belkira. Virtually identical to Belkira, until only Polgara and Aldur can tell them apart.
- Belzedar, the Apostate. Originally one of Aldur's disciples, but later a disciple of Torak. Buried alive by Belgarath.
- Belmakor, (deceased) the Melcene. An urbane philosopher and mathematician. Said to have been one of the most intelligent of Aldur's disciples. Fell into a despair which resulted in his suicide, believed to have been caused by the discovery of Belzedar's apostasy. Belgarath hints at the fact that Zedar may have had some ambiguous role in his death, but it is never explained further.
- Belsambar, (deceased) the Angarak. Exceptional at creating illusion. During the war of the Gods, suggested the use of fire on the enemy Angaraks. The mayhem caused by this suggestion caused Belsambar's depression, which resulted in his suicide.
- Durnik, a blacksmith and farmer, called "The Man with Two Lives". In all the novels he is only known as Durnik and although he is taken as a disciple in The Malloreon, he is never referred to as ‘Bel’, possibly because he was given his powers by the Gods, rather than developing them naturally. Husband of Polgara.
- Polgara, "Beloved Daughter". Daughter of Belgarath and Poledra, twin sister of Beldaran, "guardian of Belgarion" (and later Eriond), and wife of Durnik. Special status in ranks of disciples because of the two thousand years spent looking after the Rivan line, finally producing Belgarion. Frequently assumes the form of a snowy owl.
- Poledra, Belgarath's wife, and mother to Polgara and Beldaran. Believed (incorrectly) to be dead throughout the Belgariad and most of the Malloreon. Originally a wolf but capable of becoming a woman or a snowy owl at will.
- Belgarion

== Deities ==
=== Gods ===
==== Aldur ====
Aldur is the eldest of the seven gods. He is worshipped by no race of people, but has a number of disciples: Belgarath, Beldin, the twins Belkira and Beltira, Belzedar (formerly), Polgara, Belmakor (deceased), Belsambar (deceased), Belgarion, Beldurnik (formerly Durnik, admitted in the Malloreon), and Poledra, as mentioned in Polgara the Sorceress. His totem animal is the owl; this is never mentioned in the primary story (though the owl is commonly associated with his disciples), but appears in the Rivan Codex.

After Aldur and his brothers create the world in which the stories are set, Aldur refuses to take a seventh part of mankind to worship him, leaving the ancestors of the Ulgos, Dals, Morindim, Karands, and Melcenes Godless. Instead, he takes disciples, prepending Bel- to their names. Polgara and Poledra are also counted among the Disciples, as is shown by the prefix Pol- being the feminine of Bel-. At one stage, Aldur also names Polgara as his Beloved daughter, although this may be connected to the title "Ancient and Beloved", given to her father Belgarath. The Disciples all at some time take residence at the Vale of Aldur, where each disciple has its own tower, apart from Poledra and Polgara who inhabit a cottage at the far edge of the Vale. Aldur also possesses a tower, wherein furniture may appear or disappear as he wishes.

The Belgariad's MacGuffin is the Orb of Aldur: a sentient stone polished into a roughly spherical shape by Aldur, and seized by Torak.

==== Belar ====
Belar is the youngest of the seven gods. He is the god of the Alorns, and his totem animal is the bear. Belar is closely allied with Aldur in the War of Destinies, and is also described as being close to Mara. When he maintains a physical presence in the world, he appears as a young man, and is known for drinking and feasting with Alorn warriors, and for lavishing his attentions on young women. In Guardians of the West, he is identified as an incessant speaker.

==== Chaldan ====
Chaldan is the god of the Arends, and his totem animal is the bull. Chaldan emphasises pride and militaristic tradition as virtues; therefore sermons at funerals are not concerned with the comforting of the bereaved, but with vengeance. Chaldan does not play a significant role in the stories.

==== Issa ====
Issa is the god of the Nyissans. His totem animal is the serpent. Though physically present in the world, Issa spends long periods sleeping, disguised as a large statue behind the royal throne of Nyssa. When all the gods save Torak left the world, he gave the governance of his people to his high priestess, Salmissra, but neglected to prolong her life. A long line of subsequent Salmissras ruled in her stead, each chosen by their resemblance to the original Salmissra and given her name, and also given the ability to summon a physical incarnation of Issa. The last Salmissra is eventually changed into a snake and made immortal by Polgara the sorceress.

==== Mara ====
Mara is the god of the Marags. His totem animal, never mentioned except in the Rivan Codex, is the bat. Known as the "weeping god" for his long mourning after the Tolnedran massacre of the Marags, Mara is surrounded by the ghosts of his dead people, so that few could enter his domain without being driven mad. The exception is the monastery at Mar Terrin, where Tolnedran monks attempt to comfort the spirits of the Marags. He is found always howling in the ruins of Mar Amon, his capital, until the restoration of the Marags.

==== Nedra ====
Nedra is the second-oldest of the seven gods. He is the god of the Tolnedrans, and his totem animal is the lion. Nedra instills the values of thrift and wealth into his people: as a result, Tolnedrans are often associated with avarice, materialism, and deceit, a culture where money and wealth is of the highest value. Their culture thrives on enterprise and commerce. Bribery controlling politics especially in the decision of heir to the imperial throne. Nedra has several proverbs attributed to him that come in the form of advice for commerce.

==== Torak ====
Torak is the third of the seven Gods. His people are the Angaraks, and his is the only totem animal counted among the monstrous races (perhaps due to Torak's vain attempts to enhance the creature): the dragon. The left side of his body, most notably his face and hand, are maimed by the Orb of Aldur; and his left eye (called 'the Eye that Was Not') perpetually burns with the Orb's blue fire. Beldin therefore referred to Torak as "Old burnt-face"; this reference hints at Beldin's true identity when he is in disguise, as he is the only one to use it.

Alone among his brothers, Torak served the Dark in the War of the Gods, caused by himself; and when almost defeated, he forced the Orb to create a new ocean, with his worshippers on one side and their enemies on the other. As the head of a theocratic military culture, Torak drove the Angaraks to dominate their neighbors the Dals, Karands, and Melcenes, and conquered much of the eastern continent. Like many fantasy villains, Torak almost achieves domination of the world, only to be vanquished in a great battle, and re-appears, after a long absence, in the central story, wherein he is slain by Belgarion.

After Belgarion slays Torak, the Orb restores his face.

==== Eriond ====
Eriond, originally called Errand, was a spirit originally meant to be the God of the Angaraks until a 'Great Accident' (the misplaced explosion of a star) caused Torak to exist. Eriond thereafter persisted in spirit until Zedar began his search for the Orb of Aldur. Errand then appeared as a child to Zedar, who used him to seize the Orb. The name "Errand" is not derived from "Eriond", but is simply the only word that he, in his child form, was able to remember for many years. In this form, Errand was raised as Polgara's ward; and in his adulthood, accompanied Belgarion to the 'High Places of Korim', to achieve his own apotheosis. It is stated, though not seen in the stories, that upon apotheosis, he would eventually replace all the other Gods. He takes no totem animal, but is frequently accompanied by an unusual stallion (a stillborn colt revived by Belgarion), simply named Horse.

==== UL ====
UL is the mysterious god of the Ulgos, who originally were a tribe of people without a god of their own. He is not counted among the traditional seven, and theologians of their religions are ambivalent in their treatment of him. At the end of The Belgariad, it is revealed that he is the father of the seven gods, and omnipresent as well. He is also god of the monstrous beasts rejected by his sons. UL is served by a High Priest, who is always called Gorim. The successive Gorims, although not immortal, live as long as UL requires them to serve. The successor of the Gorim is identified as having violet eyes. Poledra also served UL for many years, and so may be considered his disciple as much as Aldur's. In the War of Destinies, he is generally seen on the side of Light, often working closely with Aldur. Due to his appearance as one in The Seeress of Kell, his totem may be an albatross. David Eddings mentions, in the Rivan Codex, that the spelling of UL in capital letters was a typographical error permitted to stand.

=== Demons ===
- The King of Hell is the ruler of the demons' universe. He constantly strives to break the chains in which he was bound by UL. He once hatched a plot to obtain the Orb of Aldur and its opposite the Sardion, in an attempt to use their power to free himself from Hell, and hurl UL into a prison of his making, but failed when the two Demon Lords he sent to capture the Orb and Sardion were vanquished or slain.
- Demon Lords are Disciples of the King of Hell, and as such are the most powerful demons alive. They are far beyond the powers of most or all mortal summoners to control, only submitting as part of a deal (usually having ulterior motives in the Demon Lord's favour). It is not even certain that they flee from the power of the Orb, as lesser demons do, though a Demon Lord is shown to be outmatched by the power of a God on one occasion.
  - Nahaz is the chief demon among the Karandese cult. He has waged a long war on Mordja, and sees his role in the War of Destinies, aiding Urvon, as simply a continuation of this. He is defeated and banished by Durnik upon his raising to disciplehood under Aldur.
  - Mordja appears to be the lord of the demons in contact with the Morindim. He enters the War of Destinies in aid of Zandramas, opposing Nahaz but with similar goals. Near the end of the conflict, he is trapped in the body of a dragon and killed.
- Lesser demons appear numerous times in the stories. They are occasionally named, though these names seem to be inventions of their summoners. Their relative rank and power seems to be indicated by size, with names attached to the varying degrees at one point. This is not an exact science: the Demon Lord Nahaz almost always used a human-sized form (although his true form was monstrously huge), and summoned demons' shapes (and therefore sizes) are determined by the imagination of the summoner.

== Other minor and supporting characters ==
- Adara, Garion's Algarian cousin. Wife of Hettar.
- Ariana, physician and wife of Lelldorin.
- Atesca, General of the Mallorean military, later Commander-in-Chief
- Bethra (deceased), a Tolnedran courtesan and spy. Silk's rival. Formerly the most secret of the Drasnian spies.
- Brand (current one assassinated), the Rivan Warder. A regent that serves in the absence of the Rivan King, and later Belgarion's chief minister. Like "Gorim", the name "Brand" is a title, whose holder has no personal name.
- Brendig, a Captain (later General) in the Sendarian Army, who lost one arm in the Battle of Thull Mardu.
- Doroon (deceased), one of Garion's childhood friends. Died in the Battle of Thull Mardu.
- Faldor, owner of the renowned Faldor's Farm, where Garion spends his childhood.
- Greldik, a Cherek sailor who often served the protagonists. Notorious lush but is considered as the best sailor.
- Grinneg, Barak's cousin. Cherek ambassador at Tol Honeth.
- Grodeg, High Priest of Belar and member of the Bear Cult. Injured at the Battle of Thull Mardu and left paralyzed.
- Earl of Jarviksholm (deceased), an exiled Cherek nobleman. Beheaded for allowing an Angarak into the kingdom.
- Issus, Nyissan assassin and Sadi's "employee". Later recruited by Drasnian intelligence.
- Javelin/Margrave Khendon, Chief of Drasnian intelligence. Liselle's uncle.
- Jeebers, Ce'Nedra's childhood tutor.
- Kador (poisoned), the head of the Vordue family and the Grand Duke of Tol Vordue. Candidate for the Tolnedran throne.
- Martje, a blind Cherek seer who predicts Barak's "doom" and Belgarion's importance. Ultimately stripped of her imperfect precognition by Polgara.
- Merel, Barak's wife and mother of his children.
- Nachak (deceased), the Murgo ambassador to Arendia. Killed by Hettar.
- Nerina, Baroness of Vo Ebor, and Mandorallen's beloved; married Mandorallen after her first husband's death.
- Olban, (deceased) youngest son of Brand, who attempts to assassinate Garion, is later forgiven and becomes head of Queen Ce'Nedra's guard during the war mobilization in the Belgariad. Killed at Thull Mardu.
- Oltorain, a Mimbrate Arendish nobleman, brother of Ariana.
- Poppi, a Fenling: an otter-like species cultivated by Vordai, and later given human speech by Belgarath. Affectionate to Tupik
- Count Reldegen, Lelldorin's uncle.
- Rundorig, one of Garion's childhood friends. Husband of Zubrette.
- Earl of Seline, a Sendarian nobleman and advisor to King Fulrach.
- Torasin (deceased), son of Count Reldegan and cousin to Lelldorin.
- Tupik, a Fenling: an otter-like species cultivated by Vordai, and later given human speech by Belgarath. Later Vordai's messenger to Belgarion. also affectionate to Poppi
- Unrak, protector of Geran (son of Belgarion). Son of Barak.
- Baron of Vo Ebor (deceased), Mandorallen's mentor. Husband of Nerina.
- Vella, a Nadrak dancer, known for her seductivity. Owned by Yarblek (see below) after her husband's death, but later forces Yarblek to sell her to Beldin, who thereupon changed himself and Vella into hawks.
- Vordai (deceased), the Witch of the Drasnian Fens.
- Xantha, Queen of the Dryads.
- X'bel, a dryad.
- Xera, Ce'Nedra's Dryad cousin and daughter of Xantha.
- Yarblek, a Nadrak merchant and Silk's business partner.
- Zubrette, one of Garion's childhood friends and childhood crush. Wife of Rundorig.

== Other characters ==
These are characters in the Belgariad and the Malloreon that influence the story, but do not fit into any of the other categories.

=== The Prophecy of Light ===
The Prophecy of Light is the positive main driving force of the protagonists, six of the gods, and Eriond. Often called the "dry voice" in Garion's mind, to whom (and occasionally through whom to others) it offered guidance.

=== Cyradis ===
Cyradis is the Seer chosen to appoint Light or Dark as the dominant moral force of the story's world in the final meeting between the rival prophesies. She first appears to Errand at the Vale of Aldur; later to the other protagonists at Rheon; and is shown as a slight girl with dark blonde hair and a blindfold over her eyes. She is escorted by the mute Toth. During the final Choice, Polgara removes her blindfold, to assist her decision; and Cyradis chooses Eriond (Light) over Geran (Dark), but loses her second sight. She is married to Zakath at the end of the series.

=== Senji ===
Senji is an Alchemist and Sorcerer whom Beldin, Belgarath, and Garion meet in Melcene during Sorceress of Darshiva after they followed Zandramas' trail there. He is identified as 'the Clubfoot' by Cyradis and is around 3900 years old. He leads the sorcerers to a museum where the Sardion once rested and gives Belgarath a copy of the Ashabine Oracles. His power is weaker than theirs because of lack of practice due to his focus on transmutation of metals through alchemy.

== Races ==
=== Humans ===
==== Alorns ====
Alorns are the people of Belar, that occupy the north-western part of the western continent. Divided into several nations to better protect the Orb of Aldur, but retaining strong military and economic ties.

- Algars are the people of Algaria, the broad grasslands drained by the River Aldur: nomadic cattle-herders and horse-breeders who live in moving house-trains. Their culture seems to be based loosely on that of various western Native American tribes, and they fight as light cavalry similar to Cossacks (and the Peloi of the Elenium and Tamuli). Their only true city is the Algar Stronghold, a fortress which exists solely to draw invaders to a convenient battleground.
- Chereks are the people of Cherek, the peninsula named after Aloria's last king. They are sailors, dominating sea trade (and piracy) in the West, forming the Alorn navy and patrolling the Sea of the Winds. On land, they are hunters, miners, and foresters, and also fight as shock troops. Similar to Vikings and the Thalesians of the Elenium and Tamuli.
- Drasnians are the inhabitants of Drasnia, the northern moors of Aloria. They are best known for their extensive intelligence operations. Many Drasnians are merchants, though it is implied that most (if not all) Drasnian merchants have some connection with Drasnian Intelligence. The core of the Drasnian military is heavy infantry; mainly pikemen. Their culture seems to be based loosely on that of Western Russia, adding elements of Renaissance Italy with its complex politics, intelligence gathering, and family feuding.
- Rivans are the people of the Isle of Winds, the dominion of Riva Iron-Grip, the keeper of the Orb of Aldur. The island has a single harbour, defended by the fortress-city of Riva. Trade enclaves exist outside the city, and Rivan merchants and artisans are not uncommon in other nations of the West. Militarily, the Rivans are defenders of the fortress-city of Riva, where the Orb of Aldur is kept. When in the field, they fight as medium infantry.
- The Bear-Cult is a disorganized religious order purposed to reunite Aloria; probably based on stereotypes of ancient Celtic or Germanic tribes.

==== Angaraks ====
Angaraks are the people of Torak. In Mallorea, they are the dominant people in the northwest, and are common throughout the Empire as soldiers and administrators. In the west, they occupy the southern half of the continent, and the lands east of the Escarpment in the north. They are divided into distinct castes, as shown below:

- Grolims are the hereditary priesthood of the Angaraks; feared and disliked for their role in the ubiquitous human sacrifice. In Mallorea, their power is equalled by that of the secular military. Mallorean Grolims are ruled by Urvon, a disciple of Torak, and Western Grolims answer to the Sorcerer Ctuchik, another disciple. In the west, Grolim power is nearly absolute among the Murgos and Thulls; but their hold on the Nadraks is weak. Grolims also act as the spymasters and infiltrators of the Angaraks, and are shown experts in bribery.
- Malloreans are the people of Mallorea in general, and also the Angarak population specifically. The distinction is not always strongly maintained; a typical Mallorean is one third Angarak, one third Karand, and one third Melcene. They are similar to Persians and Chinese in the conceptual mention of "boundless Mallorea".
- Murgos are the people of Cthol Murgos. Originally the warrior caste and aristocracy of Cthol Mishrak, they were the first group to migrate west, and penetrated the farthest south on the western continent. The Murgos are a highly militaristic race and practice ritual self-scarification in the name of Torak. Theologically similar to Aztecs in mutilation and human sacrifice.
- Nadraks are the inhabitants of Gar og Nadrak. Formerly the merchant class of Cthol Mishrak, they were the last to come west and remained in the heavily forested north. Their lands border Drasnia, and tentative peace exists between the two nations. Their primary industries are mining, hunting, and trapping; they are also made comical by the custom, among men, of paying a price for the indefinite escort of individual women.
- Thulls are the people of Mishrak ac Thull. Deriving from the Cthol Mishrak worker caste, they followed the Murgos west and settled in the semi-arid plains between the Escarpment and the Sea of the East. Economically, the Thulls are farmers, but are often enslaved, or sacrificed, by Grolims.

==== Arends ====
Arends are the people of Chaldan, inhabiting Arendia on the western continent and the island of Perivor off Mallorea. The Arendish nobility emphasize pride, honor, and military prowess, while the serfs form the downtrodden masses, with little variation in their conditions across the country. For most of its history, Arendia was embroiled in civil wars among the three major duchies of Asturia, Mimbre, and Wacune.

- Asturians live in the forested northern half of Arendia, the old Duchy of Asturia. The Asturians were subjugated by the Mimbrates, but lived in nominal subjection only, with their soldiers and noblemen engaged in quiet rebellion of assaulting tax collectors and fading into the forest. Their tactics resemble those of Robin Hood and his Merry Men, and similarly famed for archery. They are similar to the medieval English and Welsh, who were famed for their skill with the longbow.
- Mimbrates are the dominant people of Arendia, the inhabitants of the historical Duchy of Mimbre. The martial traditions of their nobility run along chivalrous lines, with Mimbrate knights forming a fearsome heavy cavalry, and highly trained warriors individually. The Arendish civil war "officially" ended when Korodullin, Duke of Mimbre, and Mayaserana, daughter of the Duke of Asturia, married and became co-regent King and Queen; but the Mimbrates remained the chief authority in Arendia, often refusing to recognize the titles of the Asturian nobility. In this, as in their speech and armament, they resemble the Normans of Sir Walter Scott's Ivanhoe.
  - The people of Perivor are the descendants of the crew and passengers of a Mimbrate ship wrecked off the coast of Dalasia, in Mallorea. The survivors interbred with the native Dals and established the traditions and culture of their homeland, blended somewhat with the ways of the Dals. The major difference between Arendia and Perivor is that the people of Perivor have abolished serfdom on their islands, and Perivor citizens, should they have a dispute, settle it at a tournament rather than a war.
- Wacites were the people of the Duchy of Wacune, which controlled territory later held by Asturia and then became the country of Sendaria. Polgara described the city as bright and beautiful. Following its destruction by the Asturians, most of the nobility were lost, and the lower classes were either absorbed into Asturia or removed to Polgara's Duchy of Erat (later Sendaria). Unlike the Mimbrate knights and Asturian archers, the Wacites did not have an iconic character to their military. Wacite peasants have a brogue similar to the Irish.

==== Marags ====
Marags are the people of Mara. They are generally thought to be extinct at the time of The Belgariad, after a genocidal war waged by the Tolnedrans. It is later revealed that Tolnedrans sold Marag survivors to Nyissan slavers who in turn sold them to the Murgos, and that some still lived in the slave pens under Rak Cthol.

Most details about Maragor come from Belgarath the Sorcerer, wherein it is stated girls were born 8 to 9 times more often than boys. As a result, Marag women controlled society. The governing body was a group of nine elder women known as the "Council of Matriarchs". Marriage was relatively unknown, and sexual promiscuity was common. In general, a Marag male's role in society was reduced to athletic contests or military service.

A mistranslated passage of their religious texts caused a practice of ritual cannibalism, which the Tolnedrans used as an excuse to invade their country, though they were seeking the abundant gold in actuality. This led to the genocidal war previously mentioned.

==== Nyissans ====
Nyissans are the people of Issa. The state of Nyissa is situated on the swampy equatorial west coast of the western continent. The head of state is the high priestess Salmissra, who is chosen for physical resemblance to her long-dead namesake. Most Nyissan people shave off their hair, because the insects native to the swamps of Nyissa like to nest in it. The use of drugs and poisons is common in politics.

==== Sendars ====
Sendars are a people of primarily Alorn and Arendish descent, located north of Arendia on the coast of the western continent. The land that is now Sendaria was once the Arendish Duchy of Erat, owned by Polgara the Sorceress. Tolnedran Emperor Ran Horb II worked successfully to establish the independent Kingdom of Sendaria, to prevent Arendia from becoming more influential than Tolnedra. Practicality and a strong work ethic are intrinsic to the Sendarian national identity, and a lot of food eaten in the west is grown in Sendaria. Sendars are unusual in that they elected their first king, Fundor the Magnificent, who was originally a rutabaga (and cabbage) farmer.

==== Tolnedrans ====
Tolnedrans are the people of Nedra, dwelling in the Empire of Tolnedra in the subtropical north of the western continent. Tolnedrans are known for their obsession with trade and money (which they are said to have invented). Tolnedra is ruled by one of the five major families: the Honethites, the Vorduvians, the Borunes, the Horbites, and the Ranites. The Belgariad and The Mallorean take place during the reign of Ran Borune XXIII and his successor Varana (later Ran Borune XXIV). The primary military force of Tolnedra are the numerous Legions: a heavy infantry similar to the Roman legionaries. They are also unusual in their complete rejection of, and disbelief in, the concepts of magic and sorcery, on the basis of principles.

==== Ulgos ====
Ulgos originally were Godless, but after years of pleading on the top of a mountain, their leader convinced the god UL to rule and protect them and the animals and beasts that the other gods did not. After UL renamed their leader Gorim, he returned to his people but only a minority of the group believed him. Angered by their flippant disregard for his years of dedication, the Gorim cursed the remaining so they would have no children, and he left with his followers. The Ulgos live in a city in an extensive cave system under the mountains of Ulgoland, where the forementioned beasts live. The Ulgos continually remember their godless state, and thus are ever thankful to UL and are extremely religious. They played a major role in the Battle of Vo Mimbre as they swept from the mountains onto Torak's forces and diminished their size dramatically.

==== Godless Ones ====
Other human races are descended from the Godless Ones: ethnicities chosen by no god (Aldur abstaining from selection) at the beginning of the human race. They are widely spread across both continents and have physical diversity comparable to the other races.

- Dals live in the Dalasian Protectorates in the south of the Mallorean continent, with a small remnant population in southern Cthol Murgos. The Dals are mystics and include seers and necromancers. All of them share a common group mind, once called an "oversoul".
- Karands are demon worshippers living in the north-east of Mallorea, in the seven kingdoms of Karanda. The kingdoms include Jenno, Pallia, Delchin, Zamad, and Katakor. Resembles African and Indian influences.
- Melcenes live in the south-east of Mallorea, near their ancestral island, Melcena. Melcenes are characterised as civilized, and are great administrators and architects. They could be construed to be quasi-Japanese due to their small, commercial island nation, with a touch of Southeast Asian culture in their usage of war elephants.
- Morindim are nomadic, tribal demon worshippers, living in the tundra of the Kingdoms of the West. Their upper class consists mostly of Dreamers, who "commune" with the demons, and Magicians, who control the demons. If the magician should fail to control his demon, it wreaks havoc on its former master and the clan, until it returns to its own reality.
- Godless Ones (would-be Ulgos) were cursed by Gorim following their refusal to follow him to Prolgu. Belgarath was partly raised by them before his conversion to the worship of Aldur.

=== Non-humans ===
- Ape-Bear: a Sasquatch-like predator found in the mountains of South Mallorea.
- Dragons: not so much a name as a description, referring to a graceless, gullible pseudo-raptor of tremendous size and strength; the product of a failed experiment by various gods. Nevertheless, used by Torak as his symbol, who granted the species immunity from sorcery. The alternate form of Zandramas. Only one left in existence, a female, the two males created by the gods having killed each other during the first mating season. Killed at the end of The Mallorean.
- Dryads: an anthropoid living in the Wood of the Dryads, north of Nyissa and south of Tolnedra. Dryads are always female and require contact with males of various species to reproduce. Every Dryad is magically bound to a particular oak tree in the wood, and each lives as long as the tree. One of the great families of the Tolnedran Empire, the Borunes, is closely tied to the Dryads through intermarriage. Dryads experience euphoria when given chocolate, a tactic Belgarath uses to his advantage to avoid capture and to obtain favors. Female children of Dryads are Dryads and no males of this species exist.
- Eldrakyn, Algroths, and Trolls are three anthropoid species, who menace humans in remote regions. Trolls are mentioned in Cherek, but never seen; whereas Algroths are native to Ulgoland, but occasionally venture into Arendia. They are pack hunters and their claws are poisonous. Eldrakyn, the strongest and smartest of these three bestial humanoids, are found near Ulgoland and may live for centuries. They have been known to raise and breed packs of Rock-Wolves.
- Fenlings: a mammal native to Drasnia resembling freshwater otters, but larger and more intelligent. Often hunted for furs until the witch Vordai took them under her protection. Vordai is responsible for their sapience. In Castle Of Wizardry, the species as a whole achieved human speech from Belgarath.
- Harpies are a rare species that inhabits only the remotest parts of Ulgoland. They are seen but once in the series (see: Belgarath the Sorcerer) and no description is given. It is assumed they resemble the classic Greek idea of a half-woman/half-vulture monster. Polgara recounts the incident later, describing them as semi-human, though without human intelligence. She also states that their lack of a beak makes them "second rate birds of prey".
- Hounds of Torak, also called 'Chandim' were once Grolim Angaraks, changed by Torak into giant dog-like monsters. After Torak's defeat at the Battle of Vo Mimbre, Urvon restored some of them to human form; whereafter all Chandim of either form were loyal to himself. Like their humanoid relatives, Chandim do have sorcery.
- Hrulgin are predators that closely resemble horses except for possessing fangs and claws. They are pack hunters, led by a single stallion. In the Malloreon, Prince Hettar shows interest in taming their colts; but is dissuaded by Durnik.
- Mud-men are golems constructed of mud and debris to house the snakes of Nyissa. These creatures are the assassins of Divine Salmissra and though they are easily torn asunder, their severed limbs continue to seek completion of their task. They are easily destroyed by a heavy rain.
- Raveners are found in southern Cthol Murgos, and eat the bodies of the dead. In times of famine, pestilence or war the Raveners can go into a frenzy and attempt to eat the living as well as the dead. They are able to run for days, feeling nothing but all-consuming hunger. The only thing they fear is the sea.
- Rock-Wolves, resembling hyenas, are pack hunters domesticated by Eldrakyn.

== See also ==
- The Belgariad
- The Malloreon
- David Eddings
