= Belgarion =

In-universe information
- Title: King of Riva, Godslayer; Lord of the Western Sea; Overlord of the West; Keeper of the Orb of Aldur
- Family: Geran (father); Ildera (mother)
- Spouse: Ce'Nedra
- Children: Geran, Beldaran
- Religion: A disciple of Aldur

Belgarion (also called Garion) is a fictional character and the chief protagonist in The Belgariad and The Malloreon, two fantasy epics written by David Eddings.

Garion is the distant nephew of Polgara the Sorceress and the distant grandson of Belgarath the Sorcerer, though in truth his lineage is many times removed from them, through Belgarath's other daughter and Polgara's twin sister, Beldaran, the wife of Riva Iron-Grip, the first king (and founder) of Riva. Garion's father was Geran, a stonecutter in the Sendarian village of Annath and hidden heir to the Rivan throne. His mother, Ildera, was the daughter of a clan chief of Algaria.

Geran and Ildera were killed after a Grolim sent her into premature labor while he had Pol out looking for Garion’s grandmother. After Garion's birth he set fire to their home, and he (Garion) was taken by his aunt to live on Faldor's farm. He lived there in ignorance for 14 years. He was watched all his life by Chamdar, the man who killed his parents, until he would be old enough to be coming into his talents and could be used as a pawn. However, after the "Orb of Aldur" was stolen, he was swept along as his aunt and grandfather left to search for it. Along the way he learned many things about himself and his family, including the fact he's an immortal sorcerer—and is eventually revealed to be the Heir to the Rivan Throne—after which he begrudgingly becomes king. He also falls in love with Ce'Nedra, the Tolnedran princess, who reciprocates, and is forced to marry him by treaty.

He then discovers his destiny—destroying the Dark God Torak—and to avoid a bloody war with the Angaraks, goes with his grandfather and Silk on a journey which ends in an epic duel that he ultimately wins by slaying Torak. He is then married to Ce'Nedra and has a baby boy.

Several years later, during which he matures considerably, his son, Geran, is kidnapped to be the bearer of a new Dark Prophecy. Garion follows his son's kidnapper on a trek across Mallorea, and during this time he conceives another child, meets his grandmother, befriends the Emperor of Mallorea and the King of the Murgos (who have been enemies of his allies for generations), and chooses his successor as the "Child of Light." His successor ends the eternal conflict, becoming a God in the process. He returns home for the birth of his daughter Beldaran, although he is told by the Prophecy to prepare for a few more children along the way, as he and Ce'Nedra have hugely increased lifespans, reproductive and otherwise.

During the two series, he collects various titles, which he tends to use only when it suits him. From the book Castle of Wizardry onwards, he holds the titles King of Riva, Overlord of the West, and Lord of the Western Sea, Keeper of the Orb of Aldur, and after Enchanter's End Game takes on the title of Godslayer. Through many of the books he also bears the title Child of Light (he also bears this name in the Mrin and Darine Codices) Among his most important accomplishments are the slaying of the god Torak in Enchanters' End Game, and his decision to choose his successor for the term 'Child of Light' at the Place Which Is No More in The Seeress of Kell.

== Personality ==
Raised on Faldor's Farm, Garion demonstrates all the attributes of a Sendarian farmer, which he extends to ruling Riva with relative ease. He has a streak of solid common sense, honesty, and unassuming charm. As he matures, Garion uses these qualities to deal with more 'world-wise' monarchs and politicians in a manner they are unfamiliar with, thus making Garion one of the most powerful rulers. He's also grown duplicitous enough to use his rural background as a way of pointing that he has not had instruction in intricate proprieties of certain groups—the Mimbrate chivalry and the obscure Sorcerer's code of ethics—assuming there actually is one and Belgarath wasn't dodging questions. As he put it, "Let's agree I don't have very good manners, and you can answer me anyway."

He is very private with a strict sense of honor- his time among the Sendars has made him almost prudish, though in contrast he is very worldly and aware not everyone thinks like him. However, he has a tendency to act or speak without thinking, which can lead him into trouble. He is also ruled largely by his emotions, though this trait is much more controlled in the Malloreon. He is naturally loving and will go to any lengths to protect those he cares about, but when annoyed he has a fearsome temper. He is also highly stubborn and proud, often refusing to admit he's wrong even when he knows he is. He is also highly intelligent, though he was illiterate till he was 15, and he tends to hide this and use it as an advantage on people who think he's stupid.

== Powers and abilities ==
Garion has an exceptional talent as a sorcerer being able to use the Will and the Word, and like his aunt and grandfather has a drastically extended lifespan (being the disciple of a God allows them to live an infinite amount of time.) However, he is initially unaware of the consequences of his actions e.g. he almost triggers an Ice Age whilst creating a thunderstorm; almost dies when he attempted to revive the colt in the 'Cave of the Gods' and sinking into mud when trying to throw a boulder - though this is usually because of his lack of education and not thinking things all the way through. This aptitude is (in part at least) because of his lineage, which includes Polgara and Belgarath - though it is subtly hinted he is at least as strong, if not stronger than his grandfather. The first measure of his power is shown in Queen of Sorcery when Maas says to Salmissra his power is "untried and undirected but is very strong. He could destroy you quite by accident." In the Belgariad he mainly uses "spontaneous sorcery" meaning he does it without consciously gathering and releasing his will. The Prophecy also acts through him on many occasions when he is incapable of protecting himself. In the Malloreon his powers are more mature and he has much greater control, though he tends to only do small things with it, leaving the more complicated things to his family as they have more experience.

Being the "Child of Light", he has the Prophecy of the Light in his head who tells him how and when to use his power, as well as providing information that is necessary. This voice is quite separate from him with its own personality, and it often leaves him for long periods. It has protected him on a number of occasions, and has developed a fondness for him - often acting like a family member with unwanted advice and criticism.

As the keeper of the Orb of Aldur, and one of the only remaining descendants of Riva Iron-Grip, Belgarion was one of three people able to touch it without being destroyed - an ability he now shares only with Eriond (a God) and his only son Geran (named after Garion's father). This in itself grants him huge magical power, allowing him to destroy continents if he deems it necessary; however, he rarely uses it, as the childlike mind of the Orb is enthusiastic and eager to please Garion, and as such has a tendency to overdo things (such as when it empowered Garion to knock over the gates of Jarviksholm during the attack on the city, or one point when the Orb, due to misinterpreting a stray thought as a literal request, began enthusiastically explaining to Garion how he could rearrange the stars in the sky to spell out his name, implying that Garion with the Orb has enough power to simultaneously move multiple stars across interstellar distances.) He is also, due to his connection with the Prophecy, able to recite the Book of Alorn from memory, despite having never actually read it. In fact, Belgarath claims he could have done so from the cradle if he'd been asked.

His companions on his adventures have taught him many skills, and on these journeys he has gained a great deal of practical experience. His tutorship under Silk has rendered him capable of moving silently when needed, as well as to lie effectively and he is good at gathering information from local sources. He is also adept in the Drasnian secret language, which is practised using hand signs. He has also learned how to use a variety of different weapons, and as he is a student of Hettar, Mandorallen, and Barak, he is a master swordsman, capable of taking out entire battalions single handed. His use of the "Sword of the Rivan King" has caused him to be feared in most parts of the world; as his son puts it: "when Father got his sword out, most sensible people ran for cover."

His extensive travels have given him contacts in all parts of the world, including the Emperor of Mallorea and the King of the Murgos. His upbringing also makes him aware of the common people. He has a shopkeeper friend in Riva who he periodically visits to listen to what's troubling commoners. Rather than use this to ferret out secrets, he usually applies what he learns to smoothing out injustices, such as an unfair tax.

== Family tree ==
Belgarath	Poledra
Durnik	Polgara	Beldaran	Riva Iron-Grip
Daran
Rivan Kings
Ildera's sister	Ildera	Geran	Ran Borune XXIII	Ce'Vanne
Adara	Hettar	(Bel)Garion	Ce'Nedra
Beldaran	Geran
