= The Tamuli =

Series of fantasy novels

The Tamuli is a series of fantasy novels by American writer David Eddings. The series consists of three volumes:

- Domes of Fire
- The Shining Ones
- The Hidden City

The Tamuli is the sequel to The Elenium. In this series, Sparhawk and friends travel to the Tamul Empire, far to the east. The first book was published in November 1992.

== Domes of Fire ==
Domes of Fire
- The front cover of a 1995 Voyager edition of "Domes of Fire".
- Author: David Eddings
- Language: English
- Series: The Tamuli
- Genre: Fantasy
- Publisher: Del Rey Books
- Publication date: 1992
- Publication place: USA
- Media type: Print ( )
- Pages: 480 (paperback)
- ISBN: 0-345-38327-3
- OCLC: 28486517
- Preceded by: The Elenium Series
- Followed by: The Shining Ones

Domes of Fire returns the reader to the world of The Elenium and the adventures of Sparhawk - Pandion Knight and Prince Consort to Queen Ehlana of Elenia. The novel chronicles the journey of Sparhawk and his companions as they journey across two continents to the city of Matherion, capital of the Tamul Empire - where supernatural occurrences threaten the safety of the entire world.

== The Shining Ones ==
The Shining Ones
- The front cover of a 1995 Voyager edition of "The Shining Ones".
- Author: David Eddings
- Language: English
- Series: The Tamuli
- Genre: Fantasy
- Publisher: Del Rey Books
- Publication date: 1994
- Publication place: USA
- Media type: Print ( )
- Pages: 480 (paperback)
- ISBN: 0-345-38866-6
- Preceded by: Domes of Fire
- Followed by: The Hidden City

The Shining Ones continues the adventures of the series. Having seen the beginning of the threats in the Tamuli Empire, Sparhawk and his friends launch a campaign to purge the majority of the offenders with the help of the feared Shining Ones. As events reveal greater forces working in the background, Sparhawk is forced to do what he never wished to: take forth Bhelliom, the Sapphire Rose, and wield it once again.

== The Hidden City ==
The Hidden City
- The front cover of a 1996 Voyager edition of "The Hidden City".
- Author: David Eddings
- Language: English
- Series: The Tamuli
- Genre: Fantasy
- Publisher: Del Rey Books
- Publication date: 1995
- Publication place: USA
- Media type: Print ( )
- Pages: 512 (paperback)
- ISBN: 0-345-39040-7
- Preceded by: The Shining Ones
- Followed by: none

Following The Shining Ones, the enemies have been identified, and the cards are dealt. Queen Ehlana, kidnapped by the forces of Cyrgon, is held captive against Sparhawk's delivering of Bhelliom. The Troll Gods, freed in the climax of The Shining Ones, along with Sparhawk and the Younger Gods set out to stop Cyrgon as a greater threat looms. Cyrgon, desperate after his defeat, unleashes Bhelliom's arch-rival, Klæl, and Sparhawk, taking on his full role as Anakha, goes to face Cyrgon in the Hidden City of the Cyrgai.

== Special release ==
In November 2008, Del Rey Books released all three books of The Tamuli in a single volume, trade paperback edition. This follows a similar special treatment for The Elenium. The single-volume edition features all of the original material of the separate books including maps and weighs in at 1040 pages. The cover is light blue and features a prominent picture of a crown on the front.
