= The Belgariad =

Fantasy book series by David Eddings

- Cover of book one in the series, Pawn of Prophecy
- Pawn of Prophecy; Queen of Sorcery; Magician's Gambit; Castle of Wizardry; Enchanters' End Game
- Author: David Eddings; Leigh Eddings (uncredited)
- Country: United States
- Language: English
- Genre: High fantasy
- Publisher: Del Rey Books
- Published: 1982–1984
- Media type: Hardcover, paperback
- No. of books: 5
- Followed by: The Malloreon

The Belgariad is a five-book fantasy epic written by David Eddings, following the journey of protagonist Garion and his companions, first to recover a sacred stone, and later to use it against antagonist Torak. It was a bestseller from the first book in the series. It has been called both the "last gasp" of traditional fantasy and "one of the founding mega sagas" of modern fantasy.

== Background ==
David Eddings, who had been writing in the adventure and thriller genres, has said he developed the idea for a fantasy series somewhat "cynically" after noticing how many times J. R. R. Tolkien's The Lord of the Rings series had been reprinted. He had an epiphany, realizing the fantasy genre might be very lucrative and was currently "underserved". He mapped out an imaginary world to use in developing the story for the Belgariad.

He has also said he was influenced by reading medieval epics and by Lester del Rey's editorial input. In later works he acknowledged his wife, Leigh Eddings, as an "unindicted collaborator"; eventually later books credited her as co-author. She is generally acknowledged as a co-author of the earlier books as well.

== Works in the series ==
The Belgariad is composed of five books, namely Pawn of Prophecy (1982), Queen of Sorcery (1982), Magician's Gambit (1983), Castle of Wizardry (1984), and Enchanters' End Game (1984).

The title of each book combines a chess term with a fantasy term; whereas the concept of a 'Game of Destiny' is a significant motif in the story. The series has been reprinted as a two-volume set, titled The Belgariad Volume One, containing the first three books of the series, and The Belgariad Volume Two, which contains the last two books. This does not include the original map by Chris Barbieri, but only Shelly Shapiro's map.

The Malloreon is a five-book sequel to The Belgariad. Belgarath the Sorcerer (1995) and Polgara the Sorceress (1997) are prequels that share the setting and most characters. The Rivan Codex (1998) features annotated background material.

=== Pawn of Prophecy ===
Pawn of Prophecy
- Author: David Eddings
- Language: English
- Series: The Belgariad
- Genre: High fantasy
- Publisher: Del Rey Books
- Publication date: April 1982
- Publication place: United States
- Media type: Hardcover, paperback
- Pages: 258 (paperback)
- ISBN: 0-345-33551-1
- OCLC: 26344694
- Followed by: Queen of Sorcery
- Text: Pawn of Prophecy at Internet Archive

The book opens with a prologue, beginning with the creation of the world by seven gods. Aldur, oldest of the seven, fashions a stone orb and creates within it a "living soul". Torak, the most beautiful of the seven, attempts to seize the Orb from Aldur and subdue the Orb's intelligence; the Orb mutilates the left side of Torak's body. The Orb of Aldur is later recovered by Belgarath the Sorcerer, King Cherek, and Cherek's sons. Riva, Cherek's youngest son, is found to be able to hold the Orb unharmed; he and his descendants protect the Orb from Torak.

The story then begins in earnest with the experiences of protagonist Garion. His childhood on a large, prosperous farm: his earliest memories in the kitchen of his Aunt Pol; his friend Durnik the blacksmith; early games and friends; and the romance between Garion and local girl Zubrette. It also introduces Belgarath, as a wandering storyteller nicknamed 'Mister Wolf'; Garion's telepathic vision of the antagonist Asharak/Chamdar; and a "dry voice" in his mind, distinct from his own consciousness. The reader later discovers that this is the Voice of Prophecy, or "Necessity", which takes action through him.

When Belgarath, alias "Wolf", announces the theft of a mysterious object (actually the Orb), he, Garion, and Aunt Pol leave Faldor's farm to pursue the thief, reluctantly allowing Durnik to accompany them. They are joined later by Silk/Kheldar, a Drasnian prince, spy, and thief; and by Barak, a Cherek earl. Thereafter Mister Wolf follows an invisible trail through several regions until they are arrested.

They are taken to a meeting of monarchs where Garion suspects a green-cloaked individual of treason. A few days later, Barak and Garion are hunting wild boar when Garion notices the green-cloaked spy discussing further espionage; but before Garion can tell anyone of this, he is attacked by a wild boar, which is then slain by Barak in the form of a bear. Garion later exposes the green-cloaked spy, and the latter's patrons are defeated in a fight. Garion himself is almost captured, but escapes. Garion learns that Polgara is Belgarath's daughter and the sister of Garion's second-most-distant female ancestor (identified in the prologue as Queen Beldaran, wife of Riva), and for that reason called his aunt. Having learned this, Garion identifies Belgarath as his grandfather. The group, with the addition of an Algarian prince named Hettar, then leave in search of the Orb.

=== Queen of Sorcery ===
Queen of Sorcery
- Author: David Eddings
- Language: English
- Series: The Belgariad
- Genre: High fantasy
- Publisher: Del Rey Books
- Publication date: November 1982
- Publication place: United States
- Media type: Hardcover, paperback
- Pages: 327 (paperback)
- ISBN: 0-345-32389-0
- Preceded by: Pawn of Prophecy
- Followed by: Magician's Gambit

The story opens in the Kingdom of Arendia, where Garion duels and then befriends a master archer named Lelldorin. The party travel to Lelldorin's uncle's manor, where Garion hears about a plot to kill the Mimbrate king Korodullin and to start a civil war between the two grand duchies. The plot is masterminded by a spy from Cthol Murgos named Nachak. After leaving Lelldorin's uncle's manor the party journey south towards the great plains where they are ambushed by a group of Algroths; a fictional "monster" devised by Eddings that are something between a goat facially and a gorilla bodily, while being somewhat akin to, even if a bit smaller than a troll (QoS Chapter 6). Lelldorin is gravely injured during the encounter which only ends with the arrival of Mandorallen, the supreme Mimbrate knight of the realm who chases them off. Just as he does so Chamdar's shade appears before them to mock them. Belgarath asks whether it was he who drove the Algroths out of the mountains of Ulgoland. Chamdar denies doing so but is less than convincing.

As they continue south, Mandorallen, upon Polgara's advice (but unknown to Garion who later judges Mandorallen's motives), forces Lelldorin on his honour to stay behind so he can heal from the wounds inflicted by the Algroth who had mauled him.

The party continue without Lelldorin to Vo Mimbre, the Arendish capital, where Garion reveals the plot to kill Korodullin, without naming its local conspirators, and Mandorallen challenges Nachak to a duel, which Hettar terminates by killing Nachak. Soon afterwards the party bid farewell to Vo Mimbre, with King Korodullin vowing to stamp out any untoward activity of the Angaraks (and particularly the Murgos) in his kingdom. He also pledged to ready his kingdom for the anticipated war against Torak's forces.

The party next travels to Tolnedra, and soon after crossing the border they come across a group of Monks from Mar Terrin. One of them, driven insane by the continual presence of the spirits of Maragor launches himself at Garion who naturally reaches out a hand. The man falls to the ground with an ugly welt on his head. Polgara instructs Garion to get off his horse and apologise to the man who comes to with his sanity restored. The monks proclaim a miracle, but Garion knows otherwise as do Belgarath and Polgara.

In healing the monk of his madness, Garion performed his first, albeit unknowingly, act of sorcery.

They then press on with their quest with their next planned stop being to talk to the Emperor Ran Borune in the city of Tol Honeth, and are nearly captured by a group of mercenaries for the Queen of neighboring Nyissa. At Tol Honeth, Belgarath and Polgara urge the Emperor to rid Tolnedra of the invading 'Murgos'; but Ran Borune refuses. Emperor's daughter Ce'Nedra bursts in towards the end of the meeting and Garion feels a sense of recognition although he has no idea how their lives would become forever entwined in the near future. Almost immediately afterwards Asharak presents himself to Ran Borune and it is revealed that Chamdar and Asharak are in fact the same person.

Upon leaving the capital, the group acquire an ineffectually-disguised Princess Ce'Nedra, and enter the Wood of the Dryads, hoping to cross into Nyissa ahead of their opponent Zedar. In the Wood, Ce'Nedra asks the Dryad Queen Xantha for sanctuary, on grounds of common ancestry; but is refused and soon after they continue on the journey.

As they set off and leave the Dryads behind Silk and Belgarath head off on their own in pursuit of Zedar and the Orb as they'd be able to move faster, with the intention being to meet up again in the Nyissan capital of Sthiss Tor in a couple of weeks.

Meanwhile, the rest of them start making their own way directly to Sthiss Tor, but are detained by Tolnedran legionnaires under the command of Grand Duke Kador of Tol Vordue. They are accompanied by Asharak / Chamdar. Kador demands that Ce'Nedra be handed over to secure Kador's claim on the imperial throne. Asharak just wants Polgara and Garion and doesn't care what happens to the others. Polgara is powerless to do anything because Asharak has his hand grasped on Garion's heart (in the sense that he could crush it using sorcery). Almost unnoticed Garion alone can act and when Asharak slaps Polgara, Garion strikes Asharak and speaks the word "burn" and Asharak bursts into flames. For just a moment Garion's compassion almost saves Asharak but then Polgara tells Garion in his mind that it was Asharak who killed his parents. Suddenly, the flames are not hot enough and Garion keeps the flames on him until he dies.

Polgara exalts and calls Garion, Belgarion (his birthright name) for the first time.

Upon this shocking act of sorcery Kador's men turn against him and remember their loyalty to the Emperor. They take Kador prisoner and promise to deliver him to the garrison at Tol Borune as commanded to by Ce-Nedra who is speaking in her authority as an Imperial Princess of Tolnedra.

Arriving at Nyissa by boat, Garion, angry at the treatment of the slaves there, uses the Will and the Word (the ability shared by himself with Belgarath, Polgara, and all other sorcerers in the story) to teleport one but does not know that the leeches in the river are poisonous so the slave dies. Following a quarrel with Polgara, during which she explains to him that the power he had used to kill Asharak was the same as the one he had earlier used unwittingly to cure a madman, Garion is kidnapped, drugged, and presented to Queen Salmissra to be used as a mind-controlled sex slave. He is rescued by Polgara and Barak (the latter again assuming a bear's shape); and Polgara, with permission by Issa, the god of the Nyissans, transforms Salmissra into an immortal snake. Thereafter Garion is reconciled with Polgara.

=== Magician's Gambit ===
Magician's Gambit
- Author: David Eddings
- Language: English
- Series: The Belgariad
- Genre: High fantasy
- Publisher: Del Rey Books
- Publication date: June 1983
- Publication place: United States
- Media type: Hardcover, paperback
- Pages: 320 (paperback)
- ISBN: 0-345-32731-4
- Preceded by: Queen of Sorcery
- Followed by: Castle of Wizardry
- Text: Magician's Gambit at Internet Archive

After learning at the end of the Queen of Sorcery that the Angarak sorcerer Ctuchik had stolen the Orb from its erstwhile thief Zedar, Belgarion and friends set off for the Vale of Aldur after Belgarath had received instruction to do so from Aldur Himself.

Although they preferred to avoid it, the party were eventually left with no other choice than to pass through Maragor, which was haunted by the spirit of Mara himself, who manifests his grief (for the Marags were slain by the Tolnedrans many centuries earlier) through countless ghostly apparitions that drive anybody who dares to enter Maragor (usually for the rich gold deposits) mad. On the whole only the monks—"Tolnedra's conscience"—are tolerated.

In order to pass through Maragor mentally unscathed, Belgarath and Polgara put everybody into a trance and somehow, while the others go under, Garion slipped into a semi-wakeful consciousness that has to all intents and purposes turned off his emotions. The "voice" (of the prophecy) had been waiting for this opportunity to talk to him rationally about what he is destined to do and it is here that an analogy comes up.

In the analogy the voice describes how something went wrong in the universe and it created two divergent destinies one of which is the original and the other an alternative. Garion equates this to when Doroon broke a window at Faldor's Farm and the voice goes along with this and suggests that if another stone was to be thrown quickly enough then it could deflect the first stone and Faldor's window would be saved. The implication being that the voice is the stone-thrower and Garion is the stone.

Soon after the conversation finishes, the party come before Mara and Belgarath and Polgara appeal to him to set aside his grief as the time of prophecy is at hand. Still inconsolable, Mara refuses and his grief turns to anger when he sets his eyes on Ce-Nedra, a child of Nedra. In his anger he threatens her with all kind of unpleasantness and suffering but when he goes to strike against her the voice intervenes through Garion. Too powerful to strike Mara, for fear of destroying the world, the voice stands unmoved and resolute until Mara yields and the voice urges everybody to leave Mara to his grief, as Ce-Nedra's presence pains him terribly.

They duly do so, although Belgarath and the voice talk briefly and both Polgara and Belgarath come to understand that Garion is now ready to be trained in the Will and the Word. When the voice goes Garion is put into a deeper slumber like most of the rest of his companions before they are all woken up having passed through Maragor.

Now they are somewhere probably in the foothills of Ulgoland and Hettar notes that one of the pack mares, pregnant, is in serious trouble. With the condition of the mare getting worse and the weather turning against them, Garion suggests they shelter in the cave, which he had previously been unaware of but somehow knew was always there. He led everybody straight to it and they soon took shelter.

The cave, according to Belgarath, was the meeting place of the Gods and where they conferred during the making of the world.

Soon afterwards the mare gives birth but the foal is stillborn. Without hesitation, Garion moves and brings it back to life. This is of significance because Polgara and Belgarath maintained that before this, it was impossible to use the Will and the Word to restore life to the dead.

Soon afterwards they leave the cave and continue their journey to The Vale.

Upon arriving in the Vale, Aldur confers with Belgarath and Polgara, but before they go aside Garion accompanies Belgarath to his tower and begins his instruction in earnest. Although the significance of what follows is not acknowledged by Eddings until the next chapter, Garion transitions from thinking in terms of Mister Wolf and now thinks in terms of Belgarath. It is a milestone in the series as Garion leaves behind his childhood understanding and fully accepts that Mister Wolf is in fact Eternal Belgarath.

Soon afterwards Garion attempts a conscious act of sorcery for the first time rather than an instinctive and spontaneous use of it, as he had done when healing the mad monk, burning Chamdar, translocating the slave in Nyissa and reviving Horse (as the colt came to be known). He moves the self-same rock that Belgarath moved many millennia earlier with semi-disastrous results which prompts a lot of amusement, but more importantly more instruction.

Soon after they leave for Rak Cthol and on their way the group enters Ulgoland, and head for the hidden city of Prolgu which is down in the caves below the ancient city. Prolgu was abandoned after the cracking of the world sent the monsters insane. Before they get there they encounter a herd of carnivorous hruglin, horse-like creatures, and have to kill the stallion to drive them off. Just before Hettar kills the stallion his mind (as a Sha-Dar) connects with it just momentarily before the madness returns and he regrettably kills it.

As they continue they also come face to face with Grul, an Eldrak, a giant creature related to trolls, but far more intelligent and far more deadly. They are forced to fight him to the death and it comes at some cost with both Mandorallen and Durnik suffering significant injuries. Barak also receives a leg wound.

After that, they continue unmolested to Prolgu and are welcomed by the Gorim—chieftain and elder of the Ulgo. They are there to recruit Relg a rock diviner who has both the special ability to detect caves but also to pass through the very rock itself. According to prophecies both Angarak and Western there is enough of a suggestion that caves exist below Rak Cthol which will provide a way in when they go to retrieve the Orb. Relg, as it turns out is a zealot and a fanatic and according to Gorim the "worst of the lot". When he is presented before Gorim and the party he initially refuses until UL, the father of the Gods makes himself present and commands Relg to go. UL then turns his attention to Ce'Nedra and compels her to stay behind as a guest of Gorim, the Ulgos. UL warns that if she goes to Cthol Murgos she will surely die and the prophecy will be lost. Ce'Nedra usually willful and independently minded, recognises the authority of the command and stays behind as ordered.

So with Relg now on board the party travel to Cthol Murgos. On their way to Rak Cthol they meet Yarblek, a Nadrak merchant (who later becomes a significant secondary character) and are nearly caught by Taur Urgas, the King of the Murgos. The party made their escape out of the back of a tent just in time. Silk who'd tried to flee beforehand, on hearing that Taur Urgas was approaching with an army, was caught by Brill when attempting to flee. The party were in great despair about Silk's fate but then Relg, used his specially rock divining gift to go and simply pick him up and. although the experience of seeping through the rock left Silk traumatised he was physically fine and so they continued with the journey. Later Garion learns how to create a mind shield which, with Polgara, is used to hide the party on their approach while Belgarath concentrates on Ctuchik himself. They enter Rak Cthol through the caves that lead to the slave pens and on the way they meet Taiba (a Marag slave woman;'The Mother of the Race who Died') and do what they can to make her comfortable before carrying on. On their way up they encounter Brill again, who Silk dispatches with a throw that tosses him over the parapets to his death. Silk later jokes that Brill was trying to fly, but not doing very well unless bouncing counts. Ultimately they reach Ctuchik's chambers, which only Belgarath, Garion and Polgara enter with the others being told to wait outside. Ctuchik gloats that he has won as he intends to kill Ce'Nedra and destroy The Prophecy, but then to his chagrin he realises she is not among the party and is invulnerable under the protection of UL himself. Belgarath takes great satisfaction at his adversary's miscalculation, which had actually made their passing through of Cthol Murgos easier. Belgarath then fights Ctuchik. Driven by a vision of Garion suddenly taking hold of the Orb, Ctuchik attempts to "unmake" the Orb and thus "unmakes" himself. The explosion sets off an earthquake. The group escapes, taking the now unconscious Belgarath and Errand the Orb Bearer. With the book ending with them fleeing the collapsing city.

=== Castle of Wizardry ===
Castle of Wizardry
- Author: David Eddings
- Language: English
- Series: The Belgariad
- Genre: High fantasy
- Publisher: Del Rey Books
- Publication date: May 1984
- Publication place: United States
- Media type: Hardcover, paperback
- Pages: 416 (paperback)
- ISBN: 0-345-30080-7
- Preceded by: Magician's Gambit
- Followed by: Enchanters' End Game

On their way out of the caves under Rak Cthol they pause briefly to pick up Taiba who Relg pulls through the collapsed rocks, just as he has done Silk after he had been captured by Brill. Now out in the open the role of leader is thrust upon Garion with Belgarath incapacitated after his fight with Ctuchik and Polgara focusing on protecting Errand. Unable to attack Errand directly the Hierarchs of Rak Cthol go for Durnik instead. With the guidance of The Prophecy Garion climbs into his shadow and goes after them. He soon finds them in the broken remains of Rak Cthol and shatters the jewel which they are using to concentrate their will before rather melodramatically threatening one of the Hierarchs by clutching his shadow hand around his heart. When Garion's shadow returns Belgarath stirs briefly and now the threat has been neutralised they are able to continue unshielded, but with the knowledge that Taur Urgas is pursuing them.

As they race across Cthol Murgos in the direction of Algaria things gets very tight and they are not helped by their horses cramping up. In the end, just when they thought they were about to be intercepted countless Algarian horsemen swept down and slaughtered a great many of the Murgos. For just a brief moment Taur Urgas and King Cho-Hag of Algaria came within range of each other before once more being swept apart by the ensuing battle.

That very evening Belgarath collapses and is carried to The Stronghold with the utmost urgency for his very life was in danger. Cajoled, tormented and molly-coddled, Polgara nurses him back to health. In doing so she abandons her usual remedies as she knows her father well enough to realise that he will just lay back and indulge in being taken care of. What he needed most was mental stimulation and what she feared most was that he might have lost his ability to use the Will and the Word the very thing that had kept Angarak in check since The Battle of Vo Mimbre some 500 years earlier.

Once recovered and in time for Erastide they travelled to Riva, but not before picking up Ce'Nedra from Ulgo. Then as they head west, Garion, Polgara, Ce'Nedra and Durnik visit Faldor's Farm for one last time. For Polgara it was so she could pick up some favourite pots she'd been left behind, but most importantly it was for Garion to find closure on that chapter of his life which is best represented by how coldly he showed affection, but no love, for Zubrette, his childhood sweetheart.

Now in Riva, Belgarion is led by Belgarath, Polgara, and the Voice of Prophecy to accept the Orb of Aldur from Errand in the Hall of the Rivan King, where the ancient Sword rests above the Rivan Throne. In Garion's hands, the Orb identifies him as the long-lost heir to the throne. This revelation infuriates Ce'Nedra, who discovers herself betrothed to him. During the investiture, Garion, aided by the Voice of Prophecy, sees each member of the quest as an Instrument of Prophecy.

Shortly after the betrothal, Garion learns from the Mrin Prophecy that the Rivan King must slay the god Torak or die in the process. In order to save lives and try to avoid a catastrophic war, like the one that had culminated in the Battle of Vo Mimbre some 500 years previously, Belgarion decided to set off relatively on his own to face Torak.Taking only Belgarath, and Silk with him he left notes for Polgara and Ce'Nedra with instructions not to pursue them.

From this point in the story the narrative is split into two tracks, with the first following Garion, Belgarath and Silk and the second following Ce'Nedra and everything that happens around her. The two tracks are brought back together in Enchanter's End Game when all the protagonists are brought together again just before the confrontation with Torak.

(Additionally, from time to time, in Enchanter's End Game, a third minor track is added with a chapter devoted to events far away from the main events centred on the rulers of the western kingdoms—including Nyissa).

The three of them pass through Drasnia, where they happen upon Vordai, the Witch of the Fens who is hospitable but quite defensive. Later to their chargin, they realise they are trapped in the fens and Vordai exacts a price for showing them the way out. She insists that Belgarath gives the fenlings (small otter-like creatures) the power of speech as she knew she wouldn't be around much longer to protect them. Garion is immediately alarmed, for fear that Belgarath has lost his power but by the time he tells Vordai it is too late. After conferring with the spirit of Aldur, Belgarath gives the fenlings the power to talk and it was only later when Garion realises that even he could have used sorcery to find their way out of the fens that Belgarath had done it out of compassion. Any thoughts of Belgarath losing his power are forever dispelled at that moment.

They then head towards Boktor where they confer with Porenn and Silk meets his mother who was once one of the great beauties of Drasnia. She was tragically blinded and marred by a vicious plague some 20 years earlier and visiting her was very hard on Silk who sees the blinding as half a blessing as his mother can no longer look on her face and see how scarred it became after the plague had left her disfigured.

Meanwhile, upon discovery of Garion, Belgarath and Silk's departure, Polgara enters a rage, which devastates her apartment and causes a thunderstorm overhead. Ce'Nedra too, feeling humiliated and taking it personally, has her own tantrum before calming down. She then discovers the power of Beldaran's necklace and, having learnt the reason for Garion's departure, she raises an international army to distract the Angaraks from Garion's quest so that he may reach Cthol Mishrak safely and overcome Torak.

=== Enchanters' End Game ===
Enchanters' End Game
- Author: David Eddings
- Language: English
- Series: The Belgariad
- Genre: High fantasy
- Publisher: Del Rey Books
- Publication date: December 1984
- Publication place: United States
- Media type: Hardcover, paperback
- Pages: 384 (paperback)
- ISBN: 0-345-30078-5
- Preceded by: Castle of Wizardry
- Text: Enchanters' End Game at Internet Archive

The final book of the series starts with Belgarion, Silk, and Belgarath sneaking through Gar og Nadrak on their way to Mallorea. In the opening chapters they are accompanied first by a Drasnian trader and then later by an old man who lives a hermit like existence in the forests. He warns them that Mallorean recruiters are forcibly enlisting people into the army for the forthcoming war. Soon they come across a mining town and have a conversation with a local Nadrak who tells of a Queen raising an army in the west. Garion is incredulous and even wonders if it was Polgara. Soon afterwards Mallorean recruiters arrive and the three of them manage to get out just in time—unlike their new Nadrak friend.

As they continue on their quest the three of them enter the Nadrak forest and Garion comes to see that he understands the language of wolves even in his human form. Soon they stop off in a small town. It is only worthy of a mention because it is here that they come across Vella for the first time, a Nadrak woman, who later becomes an important secondary character as she gets to know Yarblek and then later on, in the Mallorean, Beldin. Due to Silk being recognised as a wanted man they soon have to flee with a pack of wolves, one of which Garion had not long met and conversed with, putting the trackers off.

As they carry on eastwards they are ambushed in a tavern and Garion and Silk are forcibly enlisted into the Mallorean army. Belgarath somehow manages to escape. En route to Thull Zelik, the Mallorean army's staging post, the recruiters and their hapless prisoners are met my Yarblek the Nadrak who quickly disposes of the Malloreans before telling Garion and Silk that he is under orders from Drosta lek Thun, the King of the Nadraks to deliver Silk to him.

With Belgarath still nowhere in sight, Garion and Silk travel with Yarblek to Yar Nadrak, the capital, where they meet Drosta in some run down squalid inn. Just before they meet Drosta they see Belgarath apparently drunk in a corner of the inn with his head down.

Drosta is looking for a way out of the war and freedom from Mallorean domination and he asks for help, or to at least get a message to Rhodar before Belgarath bursts in and rapidly moves things along. Then, realising who Garion is, Drosta lets them continue on their journey.

They are tracked by Malloreans who follow them out of Yar Nadrak, but they manage to stay well ahead of them. However, under such pressure they decide to turn north and go across Morindland to the land bridge between the two continents rather than continue as they originally intended. Just as they decided Beldin pays them a visit and updates them on what is happening in the West and the current strategy that aims to get the Cherek fleet into the Sea of the East to stop the Malloreans from flooding in. Belgarath is deeply unhappy as he realises that such a strategy could backfire and 'Zakath will use the very land bridge he intends to use to get to Cthol Mishrak and thus block their passage. Beldin also delivers the news that the Orb will restore Torak's marred face.

They get across Morindland, after fighting off a challenge from an other clan.

Then as they finally get across to Mallorea, Garion is tempted by Torak to accept him as a father and Polgara as his mother, but rejects this offer and reaches Cthol Mishrak unchallenged.

Ce'Nedra's army invades Angarak lands, and wins a hard-fought Battle at Thull Mardu with both physical and magical powers employed by both sides. However, in the moment of victory Ce'Nedra, Polgara, Durnik, and Errand are captured by the emperor Zakath of Mallorea, who gives them to Zedar to offer to Torak. En route to Cthol Mishrak, Polgara reveals that the Mallorean Prophecies identify her as Torak's fiancée, and that her resistance to Torak's call may decide Belgarion's duel. Zedar takes his prisoners to Torak's chamber, where Zedar kills Durnik, enraging Belgarath, who buries him alive. Torak attempts to sway Polgara; but Garion sends images of Durnik into her mind, thereby helping her to withstand Torak's call. A final battle ensues, during which Garion and Torak swell into immensity, and in which Garion, having 'rejected' Torak again, kills him outright. The other gods claim Torak's body, and UL, revealed as the father of the gods, agrees to allow Garion to revive Durnik; Mara objects, but relents when Belgarath reveals the existence of Taiba.

Upon the company's return to Riva, Garion and Ce'Nedra plan their wedding, while Polgara and Durnik are married in a private chapel in the Citadel. Here, Durnik reveals that he received the Will and the Word when he was brought back to life, and that Belgarath had been training him to control the "will and the word". Ce'Nedra and Garion are married, dance with everyone, and retire to their chambers. The story ends with a half-drunk Belgarath having a conversation with the Orb, while Garion and Ce'Nedra consummate their marriage.

== Reception and impact ==
The series was a bestseller and an instant sensation. Publishers Weekly in their review of The Rivan Codex (1998) called The Belgariad "one of the founding mega sagas in modern English-language fantasy." The Guardian credited Eddings with creating "the craze for doorstopper-sized fantasy series". The series was published in a transitional period for fantasy literature, when the genre was becoming more "complex and nuanced," and the Eddings books were a sort of "last gasp" of popularity for traditional fantasy. Stephen Hunt said the books "were fantasy, but they carried a modern feel to the dialogue and characterisation, while still being firmly placed in a deeply believable fantasy world."

Jason Heller wrote a retrospective on the series for NPR in 2017 after re-reading the books as an adult ~30 years after reading them originally. He found the archetypical fantasy aspects had aged reasonably well despite his expectations that the tropes might feel worn out, and noted the story's very direct use of the hero's journey from Joseph Campbell. Heller did find that the gender roles had aged poorly, though:

Aunt Pol—who also happens to be Polgara the Sorceress, the most feared and powerful woman in the world—spends an inordinate amount of page-time happily doing domestic chores. Princess Ce'Nedra, Garion's love interest, intrepidly raises an entire army only to leave it in the hands of the men. Certain characters break stereotype, such as Queen Porenn, who has an excellent grasp of policy and tactics—but it's always made wincingly clear in the text that she's a glaring exception who only knows about military and political matters because she's married to a king who's taught her such things.

— Jason Heller, NPR, 2017

Heller also felt that the series uncritically mirrored the real-life East–West dichotomy, and that this aspect also bothered him as an adult. The protagonists are largely fair-skinned good guys in the West, while the antagonists of the series are from the kingdoms of the East and "systematically sinister or congenitally stupid."
