= Leigh Eddings =

American novelist

- Born: Judith Leigh Schall; September 30, 1937; Westmoreland County, Pennsylvania, US
- Died: February 28, 2007 (aged 69); Carson City, Nevada, US
- Occupation: Author
- Spouse: David Eddings (m. 1962)

Leigh Eddings (September 30, 1937 – February 28, 2007; née Judith Leigh Schall), was the wife of David Eddings and co-author of many of his later works and uncredited co-author of his early works.

== Early life ==
Born Judith Leigh Schall in Westmoreland County, Pennsylvania, she met Eddings in Seattle. According to her husband she was part Choctaw.

== Career ==
She served in the US Air Force.

She co-authored many novels with David, and all of David's subsequent books, but was not credited as a co-author until the publication of Belgarath the Sorcerer in 1995. It was Lester del Rey who believed that multi-authorships were a problem and that it would be better if David Edding's name alone appeared on the books.

== Personal life ==
Leigh married David Eddings on 27 October 1962. They adopted a boy, Scott David, in 1966, and a younger girl at some point between 1966 and 1969.

Her husband described her as a world-class cook, highly skilled at fishing, and an excellent shooter.

In 1969 they lost custody of both children and each were sentenced to a year in jail from separate trials after pleading guilty to child abuse. The couple kept cages in their basement, forcing the children into them for long periods of times as punishment, and on the day of their arrest, were caught red-handed in the act of beating their son. Both children were severely traumatized by the abusive treatment. Though the nature of the abuse, the trial and the sentencing were all extensively reported in South Dakota newspapers at the time, these details of the Eddings' life never resurfaced during their later successful joint career as fantasy authors, only reappearing several years after both had died.

After both served their sentences, David and Leigh Eddings moved to Denver in 1971, where David found work in a grocery store.

Leigh suffered a series of strokes and died on 28 February 2007 in Carson City, Nevada, at age 69.
