= David Eddings =

American fantasy writer (1931–2009)

- Born: David Carroll Eddings; July 7, 1931; Spokane, Washington, US
- Died: June 2, 2009 (aged 77); Carson City, Nevada, US
- Education: Reed College (BA); University of Washington (MA)
- Occupation: Novelist
- Spouse: Leigh Eddings (1962–2007)
- Writing career
- Period: 1953–2006
- Genre: Epic fantasy
- Notable works: The Belgariad; The Malloreon; The Elenium; The Tamuli; The Dreamers

David Carroll Eddings (July 7, 1931 – June 2, 2009) was an American fantasy author. With his wife Leigh Eddings, he authored several best-selling epic fantasy novel series, including The Belgariad (1982–84), The Malloreon (1987–91), The Elenium (1989–91), The Tamuli (1992–94), and The Dreamers (2003–06). David Eddings wrote over two dozen novels.

== Early life ==
Eddings was born on July 7, 1931, in Spokane, Washington. to George Wayne Eddings and Theone (Berge) Eddings. Eddings claimed to be part Cherokee. He had a younger brother, Dennis; a sister, Kay; and a half-brother, Richard Blake.

Eddings was raised in Snohomish, Washington, near Puget Sound. After graduating from Snohomish High School in 1949, he worked for a year before majoring in speech, drama and English at junior college. Eddings displayed an early talent for drama and literature, winning a national oratorical contest, and performing the male lead in most of his drama productions. He graduated with a BA from Reed College in 1954, writing his first novel, How Lonely Are The Dead, as his senior thesis.

After graduating from Reed College, Eddings was drafted into the U.S. Army, having also previously served in the National Guard. After being discharged in 1956, Eddings attended the graduate school of the University of Washington in Seattle for four years, graduating with an MA in 1961 after submitting a novel in progress, Man Running, for his thesis.

== Career ==
After earning his Master's, Eddings worked as a purchaser for Boeing. However, through most of the 1960s, Eddings worked as an assistant professor at Black Hills State College in South Dakota.

=== Early literary career ===
Eddings had completed the first draft of his first published novel, High Hunt, in March 1971 while serving his jail term. High Hunt was a contemporary story of four young men hunting deer. Like many of his later novels, it explores themes of manhood and coming of age.

Eddings and his wife were convicted of child abuse (see lower section). He did not return to academia after his jail term was completed. After a short period in Denver, David and Leigh Eddings moved to Spokane, where he relied on a job at a grocery shop for his funds, and worked at the writing in his spare time. High Hunt was published in early 1972 by G. P. Putnam's Sons to modestly positive reviews.

Eddings continued to work on several unpublished novels, including Hunseeker's Ascent, a story about mountain climbing, which was later burned, as Eddings claimed it was "a piece of tripe so bad it even bored me." Most of his attempts followed the same vein as High Hunt: adventure stories and contemporary tragedies. None were sold or published, with the eventual exception of The Losers, which tells the story of God and the Devil cast in the roles of Raphael Taylor, gifted student and athlete, and Damon Flood, a scoundrel determined to bring Raphael down. Though written in the 1970s, The Losers was not published until June 1992, well after Eddings' success as an author was established.

=== Success in fantasy writing ===
Eddings doodled a fantasy map one morning before work. According to Eddings' account several years later, when seeing a copy of Tolkien's The Lord of the Rings in a bookshop, he muttered, "Is this old turkey still floating around?". He was surprised to learn that it was then in its 78th printing. He had, though, already included Tolkien's work in the syllabuses for at least three sections of his English Literature survey courses in the summer of 1967 and the springs of 1968 and 1969. He began to annotate the map doodle, which became the basis for his fictional country of Aloria. Over the course of a year, Edding detailed around 250 pages of kingdoms, races, characters, theologies and a mythology.

As the Lord of the Rings had been published as three books, Eddings believed fantasy in general was supposed to be published in trilogy form. He initially laid out The Belgariad as three books, until his editor, Lester del Rey, advised him that booksellers would refuse to accept books of 600 pages. Del Rey suggested the series be published as five books. Eddings at first refused, but having already signed the contract, and with Del Rey's promise that he would receive advances for five books rather than three, agreed to the arrangement. Pawn of Prophecy, the first volume in the series, was published in April 1982. The next four novels where published between then and 1984 and proved to be popular. Eddings continued to produce fantasy novels for the rest of his life, usually producing a book every year or two.

From 1995 onwards, the novels were credited jointly to Leigh Eddings; Eddings explained in a foreword that their working together as authors "had been the case from the beginning." This is generally accepted as broadly accurate, although Eddings scholar James Gifford notes that collaboration would have been "impossible" with High Hunt, as David Eddings' own notes show that the first draft was completed while he and Leigh were both in separate jails, about half-way through their terms.

The Eddingses' final work, the novel series The Dreamers, was published in four volumes between 2003 and 2006.

== Personal life ==
=== Family ===
While working at Boeing, Eddings met his future wife, then known as Judith Leigh Schall. They married in 1962, with Judith taking the name Leigh Eddings.

In 1966, Eddings and his wife adopted a boy, Scott David, at two months old; they subsequently adopted a girl between 1966 and 1969.

=== Child abuse conviction ===
In 1970, while living in Spearfish, South Dakota, Eddings and his wife pleaded guilty to 11 counts of physical child abuse of their adopted children. They were both sentenced to one year in prison and lost custody of the children. They appealed the loss of their parental rights to the South Dakota Supreme Court, but it unanimously affirmed the decision based on the evidence of their mistreatment of the children. Both Eddings wrote works while imprisoned.

Though the trial and conviction of both David and Leigh Eddings was reported in the local press, the news was not widely disseminated, as Eddings was an obscure academic at the time. The conviction was consequently not remarked on after Eddings became a well-known author over a decade later; it was not widely publicly revealed until after his death.

=== Later life ===
In 2007, Eddings accidentally burned about a quarter of his office, next door to his home in Carson City, Nevada, and his Excalibur sports car while using water to flush the car's gas tank.

On February 28, 2007, Leigh Eddings died at age 69 following a series of strokes that left her unable to communicate. Eddings cared for her at home with her mother after her first stroke, which occurred three years before he finished writing The Dreamers.

Eddings' brother Dennis recounted that how David had suffered from dementia for a long time, but that the disease had progressed rapidly since September 2008, and that he needed 24-hour care. Dennis also confirmed that in his last months, his brother had been working on a manuscript that was unlike any of his other works, stating "It was very, very different. I wouldn't call it exactly a satire of fantasy but it sure plays with the genre".

Eddings died on June 2, 2009, at age 77. He bequeathed his manuscripts to his alma mater, Reed College, along with a gift of $18 million (equivalent to $26.9 million in 2025) to fund "students and faculty studying languages and literature." Eddings also bequeathed $10 million (equivalent to $15 million in 2025) to the National Jewish Medical and Research Center in Denver, Colorado, to fund research into treating pediatric asthma. Eddings' wife Leigh had suffered from asthma throughout her life.

== Bibliography ==
Eddings (both with and without his wife's credit as author) wrote over two dozen novels.
