= List of high fantasy fiction =

This list contains a variety of examples of high fantasy or epic fantasy fiction. The list is ordered alphabetically by author or originator's last name. A separate section is included for non-print media.

== Works ==
=== A ===
- Joe Abercrombie's The First Law trilogy
- Daniel Abraham's The Long Price Quartet series and The Dagger and the Coin series
- Lloyd Alexander's The Chronicles of Prydain
- Victoria Aveyard's Red Queen series
- Hans Joachim Alpers's Die Piraten des Südmeers
- Poul Anderson's Three Hearts and Three Lions
- Piers Anthony's Xanth
- Robert Asprin's MythAdventures

=== B ===
- R. Scott Bakker's Prince of Nothing series
- Travis Baldree's Legends & Lattes
- Ivan Baran's The Black Books Cycle tetralogy
- L. Frank Baum's Oz series and Gregory Maguire's The Wicked Years, a revisionist version of the same setting
- Peter S. Beagle's The Last Unicorn
- Frank Beddor's The Looking Glass Wars
- John Bellairs's The Face in the Frost
- Andrei Belyanin's Sword with No Name
- Hans Bemmann's The Enchanted trilogy
- Carol Berg's The Rai-Kirah trilogy
- K. J. Bishop's The Etched City
- Elizabeth H. Boyer's World of the Alfar, Wizard's War, and Skyla series
- Marion Zimmer Bradley's The Mists of Avalon
- Gillian Bradshaw's Arthurian trilogy (Hawk of May, Kingdom of Summer, In Winter's Shadow)
- Patricia Bray's The Sword of Change trilogy (Devlin's Luck, Devlin's Honor, Devlin's Justice)
- Marie Brennan's Doppelganger
- Peter V. Brett's Demon Cycle series
- Kristen Britain's Green Rider series
- Terry Brooks's Shannara series
- N. M. Browne's The Spellgrinder's Apprentice
- Lois McMaster Bujold's Chalion series
- Emma Bull's War for the Oaks
- Aleksandr Bushkov's Svarog series
- Jim Butcher's Codex Alera series

=== C ===
- Trudi Canavan's The Black Magician series and Age of the Five trilogy
- Jacqueline Carey's Kushiel's Legacy series
- Patrick Carman's The Land of Elyon series
- T. R. W. Cerce's Ebmundis series
- Joy Chant's Red Moon and Black Mountain
- C. J. Cherryh's Ealdwood Stories and The Fortress Series
- Kate Constable's Chanters of Tremaris series
- Glen Cook's The Black Company series, Sung in Blood The Dread Empire series
- Susan Cooper's The Dark Is Rising
- Alison Croggon's Pellinor series

=== D ===
- Charles de Lint's Moonheart
- Susan Dennard's Truthwitch
- Peter Dickinson's Angel Isle
- Stephen R. Donaldson's The Chronicles of Thomas Covenant series
- Sara Douglass's The Wayfarer Redemption series
- Brian Lee Durfee's The Forgetting Moon
- Lord Dunsany's The King of Elfland's Daughter
- David Anthony Durham's Acacia trilogy
- Maryna and Serhiy Dyachenko's Wanderers tetralogy, The Key of the Kingdom trilogy and Varan/The Copper King duology

=== E ===
- David and Leigh Eddings' The Belgariad/The Malloreon series, The Elenium/The Tamuli series,The Redemption of Althalus, and The Dreamers series
- E. R. Eddison's The Worm Ouroboros and Zimiamvian Trilogy
- Kate Elliott's Crown of Stars series
- Michael Ende's The Neverending Story
- Steven Erikson's Malazan world (Book of the Fallen and related series)
  - Also Ian C. Esslemont's books set in the Malazan world

=== F ===
- Jennifer Fallon's The Demon Child Trilogy, The Hythrun Chronicles and Second Sons Trilogy
- David Farland's The Runelords series
- Bill Fawcett's SwordQuest series
- Raymond E. Feist's The Riftwar Cycle
- Jude Fisher's Fool's Gold series
- John Flanagan's Ranger's Apprentice series
- Lynn Flewelling's Nightrunner series

=== G ===
- Neil Gaiman's Stardust
- Alan Garner's The Owl Service
- David Gemmell's Legend series
- Mary Gentle's Grunts!
- Felix Gilman's Ararat novels
- Parke Godwin's Firelord series
- Julia Golding's Dragonfly
- Lisa Goldstein's The Red Magician
- Vasili Golovachov's The Saviors of the Fan series
- Terry Goodkind's Sword of Truth series
- Ed Greenwood's Forgotten Realms
- Jim Grimsley's Kirith Kirin
- Alexander Grin's Scarlet Sails

=== H ===
- Barbara Hambly's Dragonsbane
- Niel Hancock's Circle of Light, Wilderness of Four, and Windameir Circle series
- Victoria Hanley's Healer and Seer series
- M. John Harrison's Viriconium cycle
- Elizabeth Haydon's Symphony of Ages series
- Markus Heitz's The Dwarves
- Bernhard Hennen's Die Elfen series and Elfenritter trilogy
- Carolyn Hennesy's Pandora series
- Stuart Hill's The Icemark Chronicles series
- Robin Hobb's Farseer, Liveship Traders and Tawny Man trilogies
- P. C. Hodgell's Jame of the Kencyrath series
- Wolfgang Hohlbein's Magic Moon series

=== I ===
- Ian Irvine's The Three Worlds Cycle series
- Ralf Isau's Neschan-Trilogie and Die Chroniken von Mirad

=== J ===
- Nabila Jamshed's Wish Upon A Time - The Legendary Scimitar
- N. K. Jemisin's The Inheritance trilogy
- Robert Jordan's The Wheel of Time series

=== K ===
- Guy Gavriel Kay's The Fionavar Tapestry trilogy
- Patricia Kennealy-Morrison's The Keltiad series
- Katharine Kerr's Deverry Cycle series
- Ulrich Kiesow's The Dark Eye novels
- Stephen King's The Dark Tower series
- Leena Krohn's Tainaron

=== L ===
- Mercedes Lackey's Valdemar series, the Obsidian Trilogy (co-written with James Mallory), and The Halfblood Chronicles (co-written with Andre Norton)
- Derek Landy 's Skulduggery Pleasant
- Jay Lake's City Imperishable and Dark Town series
- Yulia Latynina's Empire of Veya series
- Stephen R. Lawhead's Song of Albion Trilogy
- Louise Lawrence's The Earth Witch
- Tanith Lee's Birthgrave series and The Winter Players
- Ursula K. Le Guin's Earthsea series; Annals of the Western Shore
- Fritz Leiber's Fafhrd and the Gray Mouser series
- C. S. Lewis's Chronicles of Narnia series
- Svyatoslav Loginov's Terrestrial Ways
- Sergei Lukyanenko's and Nick Perumov's Not the Time for Dragons

=== M ===
- Sarah J. Maas's Throne of Glass series, A Court of Thorns and Roses series
- R. A. MacAvoy's Tea with the Black Dragon
- George R. R. Martin's A Song of Ice and Fire series
- Svetlana Martynchik's Labyrinths of Echo series (under the pseudonym Max Frei)
- Aleksandr Mazin's Fargal, the World of Ashshur series and The Dragon of Kong series
- Anne McCaffrey's Dragonriders of Pern series
- Brian McClellan's Powder Mage series
- Dennis L. McKiernan's The Iron Tower trilogy and other Mithgar works
- Patricia A. McKillip's The Riddle-Master of Hed trilogy
- Robin McKinley's The Hero and the Crown
- China Miéville's Bas-Lag cycle
- Karen Miller's Godspeaker trilogy
- Hope Mirrlees's Lud-in-the-Mist
- L. E. Modesitt Jr.'s The Saga of Recluce and Spellsong Cycle and The Imager Portfolio
- Elizabeth Moon's The Deed of Paksenarrion series
- Michael Moorcock's Elric of Melniboné series, Eternal Champion series
- William Morris' The Well at the World's End

=== N ===
- Vera Nazarian's Lords of Rainbow
- Stan Nicholls's Orcs: First Blood trilogy and Orcs: Bad Blood trilogy
- William Nicholson's Noble Warriors series
- Yuri Nikitin's The Three Kingdoms series
- Garth Nix's Old Kingdom Trilogy
- Andre Norton's Witch World series
- Naomi Novik's Temeraire series and Uprooted

=== O ===
- Margaret Ogden's The Realm of the Elderlings series under the name Robin Hobb
- Nnedi Okorafor's Who Fears Death
- H. L. Oldie (Dmitry Gromov and Oleg Ladyzhensky)'s Fentezi series

=== P ===
- Christopher Paolini's Inheritance Cycle series
- Mervyn Peake's Gormenghast books
- Nick Perumov's Ring of Darkness, Hjorward chronicles, Keeper of the Swords series
- Meredith Ann Pierce's The Darkangel Trilogy
- Tamora Pierce's Tortall universe, Circle of Magic series
- Terry Pratchett's Discworld series
- Philip Pullman's His Dark Materials trilogy and The Book of Dust trilogy

=== R ===
- Melanie Rawn's Dragon Prince and Dragon Star trilogies and Exiles Trilogy
- L. James Rice's Sundering the Gods Saga
- Jennifer Roberson's Chronicles of the Cheysuli and The Sword-Dancer Saga
- Patrick Rothfuss's The Kingkiller Chronicle
- Vladislav Adolfovitch Rusanov's Hot Winds of North trilogy, Blades of Boundaries series and Dragons Slayer series
- Anthony Ryan's Raven's Shadow

=== S ===
- Fred Saberhagen's Earth End sequence
- Angie Sage's Septimus Heap
- R. A. Salvatore's The Legend of Drizzt series, The DemonWars Saga series and other novels taking place on the planet of Corona
- Brandon Sanderson's Mistborn series and The Stormlight Archive
- Andrzej Sapkowski's Witcher Saga
- Maria Semyonova's Wolfhound series
- Jeff Smith's Bone series
- Maria V. Snyder's Study Series and Glass Series
- Brynne Stephens' The Dream Palace
- Paul Stewart and Chris Ridell's The Edge Chronicles
- Jonathan Stroud's The Bartimaeus Trilogy
- Michael J. Sullivan's Riyria Revelations, Riyria Chronicles and The First Empire
- Rosemary Sutcliff's Celtic and Iron Age novels
- Tui T. Sutherland's Wings of Fire series
- Steph Swainston's The Year of Our War, Dangerous Offspring, and No Present Like Time
- Michael Swanwick's The Iron Dragon's Daughter, and the sequel The Dragons of Babel

=== T ===
- Judith Tarr's The Hound and the Falcon series
- Eldon Thompson's The Legend of Asahiel series
- J. R. R. Tolkien's The Hobbit, The Lord of the Rings, and other books set in Middle-earth
- Licia Troisi’s The Emerged Word series, The Dragon Girl series, Nashira’s Reigns series and Pandora series
- Megan Whalen Turner's The Queen's Thief series
- S.I.U.'s Tower of God

=== V ===
- Jack Vance's Lyonesse Trilogy
- Jeff VanderMeer's Ambergris novels
- Vladimir Vasilyev's Shandalar

=== W ===
- David Weber's Oath of Swords/War God series
- Brent Weeks's Night Angel series, and Lightbringer series
- Margaret Weis and Tracy Hickman's Dragonlance series
- Janny Wurts's Wars of Light and Shadow series
- Tad Williams's Memory, Sorrow, and Thorn trilogy and Shadowmarch series
- Gene Wolfe's The Wizard Knight series and The Book of the New Sun

=== Y ===
- Rebecca Yarros's Empyrean series, beginning with Fourth Wing
- Lee Yeongdo's Dragon Raja series and The Bird That Drinks Tears/The Bird That Drinks Blood
- Kirill Yeskov's The Last Ringbearer
- Jane Yolen's The Pit Dragon Chronicles series

=== Z ===
- Roger Zelazny's The Chronicles of Amber series
- Paul Edwin Zimmer's Dark Border series: A Gathering of Heroes and Ingulf the Mad
- Alexander Zorich's The Ways of Starborned trilogy and The Vault of Equilibrium tetralogy

=== Other media ===
- Avatar: The Last Airbender
- The Last Airbender
- The Legend of Korra
- Game of Thrones
- House of the Dragon
- Conan the Barbarian
- Conan the Destroyer
- Red Sonja
- The Barbarians
- The Lord of the Rings (film series)
- The Lord of the Rings: The Rings of Power
- The Wheel of Time (TV series)
