= David Eddings bibliography =

- Novels↙: 26
- Background material↙: 1

This complete list of works by American fantasy author David Eddings.

== Bibliography ==
Eddings acknowledged that his wife, Leigh Eddings, contributed to all of his books, but publisher Lester del Rey believed that multi-authorships were a problem and that it would be better if David Eddings' name alone appeared on the books. Leigh Eddings was credited as a co-author starting with Belgarath the Sorcerer in 1995.

=== The Belgariad and The Malloreon ===
The Belgariad is Eddings' first fantasy series; The Malloreon is the sequel. The books follow the adventures of Belgarion, Polgara, Belgarath, their companions, and learning the Will and the Word.

==== The Belgariad series ====
1. Pawn of Prophecy (1982)
2. Queen of Sorcery (1982)
3. Magician's Gambit (1983)
4. Castle of Wizardry (1984)
5. Enchanters' End Game (1984)

==== The Malloreon series ====
1. Guardians of the West (1987)
2. King of the Murgos (1988)
3. Demon Lord of Karanda (1988)
4. Sorceress of Darshiva (1989)
5. Seeress of Kell (1991)

==== Books related to The Belgariad and The Malloreon ====
- Belgarath the Sorcerer (1995) with Leigh Eddings
- Polgara the Sorceress (1997) with Leigh Eddings
- The Rivan Codex (1998) with Leigh Eddings

=== The Elenium and The Tamuli ===
The Elenium and its sequel The Tamuli feature the Pandion Knight Sparhawk and his comrades.

==== The Elenium series ====
1. The Diamond Throne (1989)
2. The Ruby Knight (1990)
3. The Sapphire Rose (1991)

==== The Tamuli series ====
1. Domes of Fire (1992)
2. The Shining Ones (1993)
3. The Hidden City (1994)

=== The Dreamers series ===
The Dreamers series (written with Leigh Eddings) tells the story of a war between the Elder Gods and their allies and an entity known as the Vlagh.

1. The Elder Gods (2003)
2. The Treasured One (2004)
3. Crystal Gorge (2005)
4. The Younger Gods (2006)

=== Standalone fantasy novels ===
- The Redemption of Althalus (2000) with Leigh Eddings, is a standalone novel about a thief who mends his ways.

=== Non-fantasy ===
- High Hunt (1973) – a story revolving around a hunting expedition that spirals out of control.
- The Losers (1992) – a story about a man struggling to rebuild his life after an accident.
- Regina's Song (2002) with Leigh Eddings – a thriller about a woman after the murder of her twin sister.

=== Unpublished ===
- How Lonely Are the Dead (1953) – written as a bachelor's thesis for Reed College.
- Man Running (1961) – written as a master's thesis for the University of Washington.
- Hunseeker's Ascent – an unfinished story about mountain climbers.
