= Squaring the circle (disambiguation) =

Squaring the circle is a geometric problem of constructing a circle and square of equal area, with compass and straightedge, proven to be impossible.

Squaring the circle may also refer to:

- Squaring the Circle (The Story of Hipgnosis), 2023 documentary movie by Anton Corbijn
- Squaring the Circle (album), 2021 electronic music album by Sneaker Pimps
- "Squaring the Circle", track on 2013 avant-garde music album Psychomagia by Abraxas
- "Squaring The Circle", track on 2004 avant-garde metal album Bathos by Aarni
- Squaring the Circle (1984 play), 1984 television play by Sir Tom Stoppard
- Squaring the Circle, 1977 fantasy novel by Niel Hancock
- "Squaring the Circle", 1977 episode of British television fantasy series Children of the Stones
- Squaring the Circle (play), 1936 English translation of 1931 play by Valentin Kataev
- "Squaring the Circle", 1908 short story by O. Henry

== See also ==
- Square the Circle (disambiguation)
- Squared circle (disambiguation)
