= Personal Demons =

Personal Demons may refer to:

== Novels ==
- Personal Demon, a 2008 fantasy novel by Kelley Armstrong
- Personal Demons (Desrochers novel), a 2010 YA fantasy novel by Lisa Desrochers

== Television ==
- "Personal Demons" (The Twilight Zone), a 1986 segment of episode 18 of The Twilight Zone
