= Unfettered =

2013 fantasy anthology

- First hardback edition cover
- Editor: Shawn Speakman
- Author: Various
- Cover artist: Todd Lockwood
- Language: English
- Genre: Fantasy
- Published: 21 June 2013 by Grim Oak Press (US); 20 February 2014 by Orbit Books (UK)
- Publication place: United States
- Media type: Print (hardcover and paperback), audiobook, e-book
- Pages: 574
- ISBN: 978-0-9847-1363-9 (US); ISBN 978-0-3565-0442-1 (UK)
- OCLC: 857749344
- LC Class: PS648.F3
- Followed by: Unfettered II

Unfettered is a fantasy anthology edited by Shawn Speakman, featuring 23 short stories contributed by various best-selling authors in the fantasy genre. The book was released on 21 June 2013 by Grim Oak Press. The artwork for the book was done by Todd Lockwood.

On 4 May 2015, Speakman announced the release of Unfettered II, with short stories from at least 15 best-selling fantasy and science-fiction authors. The book was published on 21 November 21, 2016, with the proceeds to be used to alleviate the medical debts of other authors and artists.

A third volume, Unfettered III, was released on 19 March 2019.

== Contents ==
"Foreword" by Patrick Rothfuss
"On Becoming Unfettered" (Introduction) by Shawn Speakman

1. "Imaginary Friends" by Terry Brooks (a precursor to the Word & Void trilogy)
2. "How Old Holly Came To Be" by Patrick Rothfuss (a Four Corners tale)
3. "River of Souls" by Robert Jordan and Brandon Sanderson (a Wheel of Time tale)
4. "The Old Scale Game" by Tad Williams
5. "Game of Chance" by Carrie Vaughn
6. "Martyr of the Roses" by Jacqueline Carey (a precursor to the Kushiel series)
7. "Dogs" by Daniel Abraham
8. "Mudboy" by Peter V. Brett (a Demon Cycle tale)
9. "The Sound of Broken Absolutes" by Peter Orullian (a Vault of Heaven tale)
10. "The Coach With Big Teeth" by R.A. Salvatore
11. "Keeper of Memory" by Todd Lockwood (a Summer Dragon tale)
12. "Heaven in a Wild Flower" by Blake Charlton
13. "The Chapel Perilous" by Kevin Hearne (an Iron Druid tale)
14. "Select Mode" by Mark Lawrence (a Broken Empire tale)
15. "All the Girls Love Michael Stein" by David Anthony Durham
16. "Strange Rain" by Jennifer Bosworth (a Struck epilogue tale)
17. "Nocturne" by Robert V. S. Redick
18. "Unbowed" by Eldon Thompson (a Legend of Asahiel tale)
19. "In Favour With Their Stars" by Naomi Novik (a Temeraire tale)
20. "The Jester" by Michael J. Sullivan (a Riyria Chronicles tale)
21. "The Duel" by Lev Grossman (a Magicians tale)
22. "Walker and the Shade of Allanon" by Terry Brooks (a Shannara tale)
23. "The Unfettered Knight" by Shawn Speakman (an Annwn Cycle tale)
24. "The Twilight Dragon" by Shawn Speakman (UK edition only)

== Background ==
The book is an effort to alleviate the editor, Shawn Speakman's medical bills. Speakman was diagnosed with Hodgkin's lymphoma in 2011 and the resulting chemotherapy left him $200,000 in debt. On the suggestion of Shannara author Terry Brooks, Speakman reached out to several authors for short stories which are published in the book.

The proceeds from the sales of the advanced reading copy of the book would go towards author Dave Wolverton, whose son became comatose in a longboarding accident.

== Publication history ==
The book was initially published in five editions by Speakman's own publisher, Grim Oak Press. The hardcover books included an advanced reader edition, a limited leather-bound and slip-cased hardcover edition (signed and numbered), a limited cloth hardcover (signed) edition and a trade hardcover edition. An ebook edition of the book was also released on Kindle, Nook and Kobo.

The book was digitally published in the United Kingdom, Australia, New Zealand and other territories by Orbit Books on 20 February 2014. It included an extra tale, The Twilight Dragon, specially written by Shawn Speakman for the UK edition. The rights to the audiobook edition were bought by Audible.

A single page excerpt of each story in the book was released on Tor's website on 1 July 2013. A five-story sampler of the anthology was also available to those at the 2013 Phoenix Comicon.

Peter Orullian and Primo Pulanco released a power metal single, also named Unfettered, based on the stories in the anthology under the 'Lour Nail' label.

== Subsequent volumes ==
On 4 May 2015, Speakman announced the release of Unfettered II, with short stories from at least 15 best-selling fantasy and science-fiction authors. The book was published on 21 November 2016, with the proceeds to be used to alleviate the medical debts of other authors and artists.

A third volume, Unfettered III, was released on 19 March 2019.
