= Vladislav Rusanov =

Vladislav Rusanov may refer to:

- Vladislav Rusanov (writer)
- Vladislav Rusanov (footballer)
