= Personal Demons (Desrochers novel) =

2010 book by Lisa Desrochers

- Author: Lisa Desrochers
- Cover artist: Cliff Nielsen
- Language: English
- Series: Personal Demons
- Release number: 1
- Genre: Young adult, Urban fantasy
- Publisher: Tor Teen/Macmillan
- Publication date: September 14, 2010
- Publication place: United States
- Media type: Print
- Pages: 364 pp
- ISBN: 0-7653-2808-9
- Followed by: Original Sin

Personal Demons is the first book in the Personal Demons Trilogy by American author, Lisa Desrochers. This young adult urban fantasy series centers around Frannie Cavanaugh, a good Catholic girl with a unique skill she's unaware she possesses, who finds herself in a battle for not just her soul, but also her heart, between Lucifer Cain, a demon sent by the king of Hell to tag Frannie's soul, and Gabriel, the angel sent from Heaven to protect her.

Prior to release, Personal Demons received praise from The New York Times bestselling authors Claudia Gray and Maria V. Snyder, as well as School Library Journal. Barnes & Noble called Personal Demons "Twilight with a soul."

== Overview ==
Told from Frannie's and Luc's alternating points of view, Personal Demons begins when Luc Cain, a demon employed in Hell's Acquisitions Department, walks into Frannie Cavanaugh's high school (Haden High) on a mission to tag for a specific soul for Hell. He meets up with Frannie and uses his demonic charm to lure Frannie to him.

However, things got unsettled for Luc when Gabriel arrives, prepared to do anything to keep him from getting what he came for. Frannie finds herself torn between the two boys, and it isn't long before they find themselves fighting for more than just her soul.

As the story unfolds, a variety of demons show up to finish the job that Luc seems unable to bring himself to complete. Frannie won't bend to Luc, but Gabriel is unable to tag her soul for Heaven and protect her until she forgives herself for her perceived guilt in the death of her twin brother years earlier.

In this struggle between good and evil, angel and demon race to tag Frannie's soul and determine the fate of Heaven and Earth.

== Characters ==
=== Main ===
- Frannie (Mary Francis) Cavanaugh, the 17-year-old protagonist who, though unaware of it, possesses a skill so powerful that she has the king of Hell shivering with anticipation.
- Luc Cain, the demon sent by King Lucifer from Hell's Acquisitions Department to tag Frannie's soul. He struggles with his changing feelings toward Frannie, and by the end, discovers she's changed more than his mind.
- Gabe, a Dominion from the Second Sphere, and the Left Hand of the archangel Gabriel, sent to protect Frannie and keep Luc from getting what he came for.

=== Supporting ===
- Belias and Avaria, demons sent to tag Frannie for Hell when Luc is slow getting the job done.
- Beherit, Head of Acquisitions for Hell, who takes matters into his own hands when no one is able to tag Frannie.
- Grandpa (Ed Shanahan), Frannie's maternal grandfather, with whom she rebuilds vintage Mustangs. He is her confidant. His wife (Frannie's grandmother) with whom Frannie was also close, died in an accident.
- Daniel Cavanaugh – Frannie's father. Luc notices something strange about him at first meeting and finds he's unable to phase into Frannie's house. We’re unsure what his situation is at the end of Personal Demons, but find out in the sequel, Original Sin.
- Mary Theresa, Mary Katherine, Mary Grace and Mary Margaret – Frannie's sisters, who also may have special skills.
- Taylor and Riley, Frannie's best friends who plays an instrumental roll in book two of the Personal Demons trilogy, Original Sin.

== Background ==
Author Lisa Desrochers said she started writing a few years back for her daughter, who was an avid reader. Personal Demons started when her demon, Lucifer Cain popped into her head and begun to tell his story. "I'm just the poorly paid help with the laptop," Desrochers said about the experience. "I took dictation as fast as I could."

She researched demon and angel hierarchies and shaped her fictional Hell into a bureaucracy, where we meet demons who work in Acquisitions, Security, and Corrections Departments.

== Publication history ==
Personal Demons was first published in the United States on September 14, 2010, by Tor Teen, an imprint of Macmillan. On October 1, 2010, the Australian edition was released by Pan Macmillan. Editora iD released the Brazilian translation in December 2010. In 2011, foreign translations were published in May by Newton Compton in Italy, where it was re-titled Il Bacio Maledeto (The Cursed Kiss), in June in Spain by La Factoria de Ideas and in August in Germany by Rowohlt where it was re-titled Angel Eyes. Publication of additional translations are in production in France, Russia, Hungary, Turkey, Poland and Portugal.

== Covers ==
Original Sin

Last Rite

Cliff Nielsen, the artist responsible for Cassandra Clare's City of Bones cover, designed all three covers for the Personal Demons Trilogy, depicting the struggle of the three main characters, Frannie, Luc and Gabe.

== Major themes ==
Personal Demons explores issues of faith and forgiveness, as well as first love and finding one's place in the world.

== Reception ==
Barnes& Noble said, "While comparing an unassuming debut novel to an international pop culture phenomenon may be unfair, the reality is this: Personal Demons by Lisa Desrochers is better written than Twilight, has more well developed and realistic characters, and is decidedly more edgy and existentially weighty. Yes, I completely understand the mass appeal of Meyer’s Twilight saga – and while angels and demons may not be as "sexy" as werewolves with abs of steel and brooding vampiric James Dean wannabes, the profoundly deep questions raised in Personal Demons (about the existence of God, the inanity of organized religion, the healing power of forgiveness, etc.) make it a much more forceful read."

School Library Journal "Heavy on teen angst, this novel will be enjoyed by fans of supernatural romance."

Booklist said, "...introducing some wild twists in a tale that stands alone well enough but leaves avenues for sequels. Though the theology doesn’t bear close examination, readers may have to take breaks to cool down."

2010 Library Journal Fall Firsts pick.

2011 YALSA Popular Paperback for Young Adults nominee.

== Sequels in the trilogy ==
Book #	Title	US release
1	Personal Demons	September 14, 2010
Frannie discovers she has a hidden power so valuable that the king of Hell wants her in his fold. She finds herself caught in a struggle for her soul between the dark and alluring Luc, and the sweet, angelic Gabe.
2	Original Sin	July 5, 2011
Frannie, Gabe and Luc find out no one is above temptation. Hell hasn't given up on Frannie, but Heaven won't give in. And not everyone will survive.
3	Last Rite	May 12, 2012
What happens when you can't outrun Hell...or trust the ones you love?
