= Imaginary Friends (short story) =

1991 fantasy book

- Cover art of Imaginary Friends
- Author: Terry Brooks
- Language: English
- Genre: Fantasy
- Publisher: Del Rey Books
- Publication date: October 11, 2011
- Publication place: United States
- Media type: eBook
- Pages: 27 pp

"Imaginary Friends" is a 1991 fantasy short story by Terry Brooks, and was an early "prototype/precursor" of what would later become the Shannara series. It was published as part of Unfettered, which is a collection of fantasy short stories that Brooks contributed to, the proceeds of which went to his friend and editor of the book, Shawn Speakman's "considerable medical bills."

== Plot ==
Jack is a 13-year-old boy living with his parents in a house near a park forest, when he's Jack diagnosed with a blood disorder. A flashback reveals that when he was 6 years old he stumbled and fell while playing in his sand box, hitting his head. He then sees his dog barking at something and goes into the forest to investigate, despite having been specifically told by his parents not to. As he approaches the dog, he see it barking at a tiny, strangely dressed creature. The creature says he is a wood elf named Pick. Jack chases the dog off and frees Pick from the brush he had become entangled in. Pick then shrinks Jack down to his size and they go for a ride on Pick's owl, Daniel. Jack sees the entire forest from above and Pick points out a troll under the bridge. He also shows Jack a tree where a dragon named Desperado is being imprisoned. They land and Jack hears his mom call him. He turns to look and when he turns back, Pick is gone. Later, he searches for the troll tree where Desperado is imprisoned but finds nothing. He tells his mother about it, and she responds that it is normal for kids his age to have imaginary friends - and that he should keep them to himself.

Years later, after his medical diagnosis, he tells his friend Waddy that he has been given six months to live, but Waddy tells him that he’ll probably beat the cancer. That night, Jack hears someone calling for him outside. He runs outside, tripping over the dog and bumping his head again. He proceeds runs into the forest and finds Pick locked in a cage hanging from the troll bridge, with the troll gone. Pick informs Jack that the troll has gone to release Desperado from his prison and that Jack must stop him. Jack runs to the tree and picks up a trash can lid and branch, that magically become a shield and sword. The troll is lying on the ground, burnt. The dragon is huge and is made up of all Jack's doubt, fears and sickness. He runs from him, but the dragon is everywhere he turns. Finally he resolves to fight the dragon and beats it back into its prison. He then awakes in the hospital, where his parents tell him they found him lying outside unconscious. During his stay, more tests are run and they find that all traces of the cancer are gone.

Waddy tells Jack he knew he would beat it, but Jack knows that it was defeating the dragon that destroyed the sickness.

== Characters ==
- Jack: a 13-year-old boy, recently diagnosed with cancer and given 6 months to live
- Waddy: Jack’s best friend
- Pick: a tiny wood elf
- Desperado: a dragon trapped by magic in a tree in the park forest

== Reception ==
Sylas K. Barrett of Reactor writes "both traditional fairy tales and many modern children’s stories are designed to teach lessons to children, lessons about greed, or not trusting strangers, or how to face the trials of growing up. They can also provide tools to help children face those trials, and that is clearly what Brooks designed “Imaginary Friends" to do."
