= When Voiha Wakes =

1983 novel by Joy Chant

- Author: Joy Chant
- Publication date: 1983

When Voiha Wakes is a novel by Joy Chant published in 1983. It is the third stand-alone novel set in the land of Vanderai, as were Red Moon and Black Mountain (1970), and The Grey Mane of Morning (1977).

== Plot summary ==
When Voiha Wakes is a novel about a matriarchal society in which men are relegated to working at crafts and living segregated from women.

== Reception ==
Dave Langford reviewed When Voiha Wakes for White Dwarf #50, and stated that "Arrange the sexes as you will: it stays a relatively mundane story. Caused me no pain.". In 2009, Brian Stableford described the novel as "more enterprising, but less successful" than The Grey Mane of Morning "in its depiction of a matriarchal society".

== Reviews ==
- Review by Faren Miller (1983) in Locus, #271 August 1983
- Review by Judy Collins (1983) in Fantasy Newsletter, #63 October–November 1983
- Review by Baird Searles (1984) in Isaac Asimov's Science Fiction Magazine, January 1984
- Review [French] by Élisabeth Vonarburg (1984) in Solaris, #54
- Review by Don D'Ammassa (1984) in Science Fiction Chronicle, January 1984
- Review by Mary Gentle (1984) in Interzone, #8 Summer 1984
