= The Wizard and the Warlord =

1983 novel by Elizabeth H. Boyer

- Cover of the 1983 Del Rey / Ballantine edition
- Author: Elizabeth H. Boyer
- Language: English
- Publication date: 1983

The Wizard and the Warlord is a 1983 novel written by Elizabeth H. Boyer.

== Plot summary ==
The Wizard and the Warlord is a novel in which Sigurd's farming community is plagued by superstition and external threats including harsh winters, wolves, and relentless troll attacks. As families flee south, blaming his grandmother for their misfortune, Sigurd is left alone. After her death, he is captured and adopted by outlaws, leading him into the realm of the Alfar — where he is thrust into a war between light and dark elves.

== Reception ==
John T. Sapienza, Jr. reviewed The Wizard and the Warlord for Different Worlds magazine and stated that "Readers of the [Norse] sagas will recognize themes and motifs used by the author in details of the plotline: the isolated heir, the cursed sword, kinslaying/friendslaying, the persecuting monster, and encounters with people are not what they seem, among others. The real justification for recycling old materials is that by doing so, the author brings them to life for the modern reader in greater detail than the novice can get from simply reading translations of the original sagas. The only thing I hesitate about in this process is the happy ending Boyer gives her tale, but that is the modern preference, unlike the original Vikings who liked sagas with tragic endings."

== Reviews ==
- Review by Roger C. Schlobin (1983) in Fantasy Newsletter, #63 October-November 1983
- Review by Mark Greener (1987) in Paperback Inferno, #66
- Review by Ken Brown (1987) in Interzone, Autumn 1987, (1987)
