= The Elves and the Otterskin =

1981 novel by Elizabeth Boyer

The Elves and the Otterskin is a novel by Elizabeth Boyer published in 1981.

== Plot summary ==
The Elves and the Otterskin is a novel in which a young apprentice wizard must complete the quest of his master to prevent a war between elves and dwarves by slaying a dragon, after the master is killed.

== Reception ==
Greg Costikyan reviewed The Elves and the Otterskin in Ares Magazine #12 and commented that "competently written, but with nothing new to say [...] Light entertainment. So, now what?"

== Reviews ==
- Review by Andy Sawyer (1986) in Paperback Inferno, #63
