= Square the Circle =

Square the Circle may refer to:

- Square the Circle (Joan Armatrading album)
- Square the Circle (Mami Kawada album)

== See also ==
- Squaring the circle, a geometric problem
- Squaring the circle (disambiguation)
- Squared circle (disambiguation)
- Tarski's circle-squaring problem
- The Square Circle, a 1982 novel by Daniel Carney
