= Squared circle =

Squared circle may refer to:

- Boxing ring
- Wrestling ring
- Squared-circle postmark
- Squared circle, an alchemical symbol
- Squircle

== See also ==
- Round square (disambiguation)
- Square the Circle (disambiguation)
- Squaring the circle, a geometric problem
- Squaring the circle (disambiguation)
- Circle in the Square Theatre
