= Age of Myth =

2016 book by Michael J. Sullivan

- First edition
- Author: Michael J. Sullivan
- Cover artist: Marc Simonetti
- Language: English
- Series: Legends of the First Empire
- Genre: High Fantasy; Adventure
- Publisher: Del Rey Books
- Publication date: 2016-06-28
- Publication place: U.S.A.
- Media type: Print (Paperback Hardcover); Audiobook; ebook
- Pages: 432
- ISBN: 1101965339
- OCLC: 978656670
- Followed by: Age of Swords

Age of Myth is a high fantasy novel written by Michael J. Sullivan. It was released on June 28, 2016, and is the first book in the Legends of the First Empire series. It was followed by Age of Swords on July 25, 2017.

== Plot ==
Since time immemorial, individuals have worshiped gods they call Fhrey, who are: invulnerable in war, masters of magic, and seemingly immortal. But when a god falls to a human blade, the balance of power between humans and those they thought were gods changes forever.

== Characters ==
- Raithe – A skilled warrior from the Rhune clan Dureya. After his father Herkimer is killed by the Fhrey Shegon, Raithe kills Shegon and becomes known as the God Killer.
- Malcolm – A former Fhrey slave from Alon Rhist. He aides Raithe in killing Shegon by throwing a rock at the Frey's head. Afterwards, Malcolm joins Raithe in fleeing the wrath of the Fhrey.
- Mawyndulë – The prince of the Fhrey and a Miralyith. He is the son of Fane Lothian and his grandmother was Fane Fenelyus, the first Miralyith and practitioner of The Art.
- Arion – A Fhrey Miralyith and tutor to Prince Mawyndulë. She is tasked with bringing the God Killer to justice and in the process ends up aiding Raithe and the other Rhunes. She was a favourite student of the former Fane Fenelyus who gave Arion the nickname Cenzlyor.
- Persephone – The widow of the recently deceased Dahl Rhen chieftain Regland and Second Chair. After the death of her husband she becomes the target of assassination by the new chieftain. With the help of Raithe and Malcolm, Persephone survives the attempts and manages against all odds to help her clan survive an attack from a Miralyith.
- Nyphron – Son of Zephyron and leader of the Galantians who are famed for legendary exploits of valor and bravery. He aids the people of Dahl Rhen against other Fhrey.
- Suri – A young mystic raised and mentored by Tura, an ancient mystic who lived in the Crescent Forest near Dahl Rhen. Suri came to Dahl Rhen to warn of a coming storm and is always accompanied by a white wolf named Minna.
- Minna – A wolf and Suri's best friend. Minna is fiercely protective of Suri.
