= King Raven Trilogy =

Historical novels by Stephen R. Lawhead

- Omnibus collection published in 2011
- Hood; Scarlet; Tuck
- Author: Stephen R. Lawhead
- Country: United States
- Language: English
- Genre: Historical Fiction; Medieval fantasy
- Publisher: Thomas Nelson
- Published: 2006 - 2009
- Media type: Print (Hardcover and paperback)

The King Raven Trilogy is a series of historical novels by American writer Stephen R. Lawhead, based on the Robin Hood legend. Lawhead relocates Robin Hood from Sherwood Forest in Nottingham to Wales, and sets the story in the late eleventh century, after the Battle of Hastings and to coincide with the Norman invasion of Wales and the struggles the Cymry (Welsh) people against the Normans, and the political intrigue of medieval Britain. The trilogy consists of three books named Hood, Scarlet, and Tuck. The King Raven series continued his themes of reimagining popular mythology into more authentic and gritty settings, which began with his Pendragon Cycle.

== Novels ==
=== Hood ===
Hunted like an animal by Norman invaders, Bran ap Brychan, heir to the throne of Elfael, abandoned his father's kingdom and fled to the greenwood. There, in the primeval forest of the Welsh borders, danger surrounded him, for this woodland is a living, breathing entity with mysterious powers and secrets. Bran needed to find a way to make it his own if he was to survive. Through the suffering of his pride-torn soul and the land of his ancestors being destroyed, Bran realized the dangerous paths through which his ambition was drawn and he soon succumbed to his fate.

The book was dedicated to the Schloss Mittersill Community in Austria, which he and his wife were part of for a couple of years.

=== Scarlet ===
After he lost everything he owned, forester Will Scarlet embarked on a search for King Raven, whose exploits had already become legendary. After he fulfilled his quest and proved himself a skilled and loyal companion, Will joined the heroic archer and his men.

Scarlet is captured and imprisoned, however, for being a follower of the rebel, Raven. He is sentenced to death by hanging unless he delivers King Raven and his band of cohorts to Raven's enemies. That, of course, he would never do. Simultaneously, Wales is slowly falling under the control of the invading Normans and King William the Red has given his ruthless barons control of the land. In desperation, the people turn to King Raven and his men for justice and survival in the face of the ever-growing onslaught.

In 2008, Scarlet won a Christy Award in the category of Visionary Fiction.

=== Tuck ===
The story of Rhi Bran y Hud is concluded as Abbot Hugo and the Norman invaders attempted to wipe out King Raven and his flock once and for all.

Their merciless attack, the first of many to come, heralded a dark and desperate day for the realm of Elfael. Bran and his few stalwarts desperately pray and search for encouragement and reinforcement from the people in order to survive. Bran and Friar Tuck, a most unconventional priest, ride north to rally the tribes of Wales to the battle, make new friends, and powerful enemies along the way.

Tuck, the final installment of the trilogy, was released on January 22, 2009.

=== Publication history ===
- — (2006). Hood (1st hbk ed.). WestBow. ISBN 978-1-59554-085-0.
- — (3 June 2007). Hood (pbk ed.). Thomas Nelson. ISBN 978-1-59554-088-1.
- — (8 June 2008). Scarlet (pbk ed.). Thomas Nelson. ISBN 978-1-59554-089-8.
- — (14 December 2009). Tuck (pbk ed.). Thomas Nelson. ISBN 978-1-59554-090-4.
- — (4 April 2011). King Raven (Omnibus eBook ed.). Thomas Nelson. ISBN 978-1-40168-539-3.

== Reception ==
Scarlet was particularly well-received, winning a Christy Award in 2008 in the "Visionary" category.
