= Round square =

Round square may refer to:

- Round square copula, an example of the dual copula strategy used in philosophy
- Round Square, an international educational organisation

== See also ==
- Rounded square
- Squared circle (disambiguation)
