= Blake Charlton =

American science fiction author

- Born: 1979 (age 46–47)
- Occupations: Author, physician
- Writing career
- Period: 2010–present
- Genre: Science fiction
- Website: blakecharlton.com

Blake Charlton (born 1979) is an American science fiction author. He is the author of the Spellwright series published by Tor Books and currently a cardiology fellow at the University of California, San Francisco. As a boy, Charlton had severe dyslexia. He learned to read fluently by the age of 13. As an author, he's been largely held by libraries.

Charlton's non-fiction has appeared in the Journal of the American Medical Association Internal Medicine, The British Medical Journal, and The New York Times and his science fiction short stories have appeared in the Seeds of Change and the Unfettered anthologies.

Charlton graduated summa cum laude from Yale University studying English Language and Literature and went on to graduate from Stanford Medical School.

In 2013, Blake Charlton was the IDA's (International Dyslexia Association) 12th recipient of the Pinnacle Award. The award recognizes an individual who publicly acknowledges their dyslexia and has been successful in their respective field.

The Spellwright trilogy is set in a world where languages are the basis for magic. Nicodemus Weal is a cacographer (similar to Charlton's own dyslexia), who nonetheless is talented in magical languages. However, his disability causes misspelling in any text he touches.

== Bibliography ==
=== Series fiction ===
==== Spellwright trilogy ====
- Spellwright (2010), Tor Books, ISBN 9780765317278
- Spellbound (2011), Tor Books, ISBN 9780765317285
- Spellbreaker (2016), Tor Books, ISBN 9780765317292
