= Riyria Revelations =

Novel series by Michael J. Sullivan

- Theft of Swords; Rise of Empire; Heir of Novron
- Author: Michael J. Sullivan
- Language: English
- Genre: Epic fantasy
- Publisher: Orbit Books
- Published: 2011 - 2012
- Media type: Print (paperback hardcover); Audiobook ebook
- Preceded by: The Riyria Chronicles

The Riyria Revelations is a series of high fantasy novels written by Michael J. Sullivan and published by Orbit Books in 2011 and 2012. The series consists of three original titles, Theft of Swords, Rise of Empire, and Heir of Novron. The books were previously self-published as a six-volume series selling 90,000 copies.

== Plot ==
=== Volume I: Theft of Swords ===
==== Book 1: The Crown Conspiracy ====
After a successful raid, Royce and Hadrian (together known as Riyria) are approached by a man offering much gold to steal a sword owned by Count Pickering, from the royal palace in Medford, the capital of the kingdom of Melengar. While searching for the sword they discover the dead body of the King and are accused of his murder. Arista, Princess of Melengar, saves them from execution. In return, they kidnap her brother, Alric, because she thinks he will also be killed. Following Arista's instructions, Riyria and Alric make their way to the prison where the wizard Esrahaddon is being held. On the way, they are ambushed on a river and come across a burned monastery, whose only survivor, Myron, joins the group. While the group travels to the prison, Arista grows suspicious of her uncle Percy Braga. She uses magic taught to her by Esrahaddon to confirm that Braga had a hand in her father's death. Braga accuses her of witchcraft and has her imprisoned for murdering her father. At the prison, Alric frees Esrahaddon, who reveals that he was falsely imprisoned for murdering the emperor and destroying the empire nearly a thousand years ago. After giving the group some advice on what to do next, Esrahaddon leaves to pursue something he started before he was imprisoned. While eating and planning their next move at a local inn a group of soldiers arrive and make trouble for the owner and patrons. Alric steps in to intervene and proves his identity as the prince and future king. The group decides to go their separate ways now that Alric is with his soldiers and Riyria has completed their job.

After Alric leaves, Royce and Hadrian deduce that Alric is with a group of mercenaries, most likely employed by whoever murdered his father. After killing the mercenaries (whom Myron recognizes as the men who burned down the abbey), the group then attempts to return to Medford, but soon realize that Braga has seized power there. Braga discusses with his co-conspirator, who is revealed to be Bishop Saldur. Saldur explains that since the fall of the old empire, a thousand years ago, the church has been working to place their agents in positions of power in every kingdom in order to establish a new empire. With Alric's presumed death and Arista scheduled for execution, Braga is poised to become king and potentially emperor. Alric goes to Drondil Fields, where he enlists the Pickerings (loyal family friends) to help raise an army to defeat Percy. There the group meet Count Pickering and his sons Fanen and Mauvin, who were unaware of the king's death. When Hadrian and Mauvin spar it is revealed that Hadrian knows the ancient and forgotten Teshlor fighting style that made knights of the old empire unstoppable. Riyria infiltrates the city and asks Royce's lover, Gwen DeLancy, to incite a riot to distract the guards from the army marches toward Medford. While Royce saves Arista from her tower that was rigged to collapse, Hadrian holds Braga at bay. When Alric sees his troops begin to die for him he charges ahead and demands to be let in. The commoners who have taken the gate, open it to let the army through. Count Pickering duels Braga and decapitates him. Although the coup is stopped, no one is aware of Saldur's involvement and he crowns Alric king. Myron is given the materials to rebuild the abbey, which will be an exact replica due to his photographic memory. Sometime later Riyria places Braga's head on the lap of a sleeping conspirator as a warning to the enemies of Melengar.

==== Book 2: Avempartha ====
Almost a year after the events of the previous book, Royce and Hadrian have tracked down the man who enlisted their help to steal Count Pickering's sword and framed them for the king's murder. Confronting him in the merchant city of Colnora, they discover that he is a simple sailor named Wyatt, who took the job as a way to care for his adopted daughter, Allie. Royce decides to spare Wyatt after seeing Allie (who is half elf). Riyria starts to head out of the city, but is stopped by an old associate of Royce's. It's revealed that Royce was once a member of a feared criminal guild called the Black Diamond and was tricked into assassinating his best friend's lover, who in return had Royce sent to Manzant prison. Riyria is informed that a young girl named Thrace is looking to hire them. After tracking her down and saving her from being raped, she explains that a dragon-like creature is terrorizing her village, Dhalgren. Although she is unable to pay their standard fee, Royce agrees when she mentions a man who matches Esrahaddon's description staying at the village. Meanwhile, King Alric has Arista appointed as an ambassador. While traveling to meet with the king of a nearby kingdom of Rhenyyd, her coach stops at Ervanon to meet with Archbishop Galien and Bishop Saldur. The Bishops question her about her relationship with Esrahaddon and reveal that he might have had a hand in her father's death. Though she dodges most of their questions, she begins to have doubts about Esrahaddon. Saldur joins her on her way to Rhenyyd. Arista meets with the king of Rhenyyd, who does not treat her seriously, because she is a woman and a rumor that she is a witch. During the meeting Arista notices mir (elves mixed with humans) slaves being treated poorly by the king. Riryia and Thrace arrive at Dhalgren to find that more of the villagers have been killed since Thrace left. They meet Thrace's father Theron, who is preparing to hunt the monster. While he is dismissive of Thrace, Theron is determined to kill the beast who killed the rest of his family.

Hadrian deduces that hunting the beast is Theron's suicide attempt. The monster attacks that night killing another villager, but Royce catches a glimpse of it. Esrahaddon reveals himself and explains the monster is actually an ancient elven magical construct, that the elves used in a war against humans thousands of years ago, called a Gilarabrywn. He explains that only a sword with the creature's true name carved into the blade can kill it, which is located in an elven tower at the edge of a waterfall. Esrahaddon explains that the tower was once the elve's last standing stronghold between the humans and their homeland. Finding no way across, the human emperor built a bridge to cross over and won the war. The tower became a storage facility for magic weapons and when the last emperor met with the elves at a peace summit, a Gilarabrywn was activated by anti-human elves. To save the emperor Esrahaddon magically sealed the tower to trap the Gilarabrywn, resulting in the death of everyone inside. Royce surmises that over 1,000 years later someone has freed the Gilarabrywn for an unknown reason. Meanwhile, Arista meets Mauvin and Fanen while traveling to a tournament site and determines that Dahlgren is hosting it. Saldur and Galien meet and it is revealed that they unleashed the Gilarabrywn. Their plan is to pronounce whoever kills the creature the Heir of Novron (the first Emperor) and rule the world through him. They give their chosen warrior a sword that they believe will instantly kill the Gilarabrywn.

Arriving at Dahlgren the bishops evict the townspeople from the fortified manor leaving them unprotected. When the Gilarabrwyn attacks again, the bishop's sword is revealed as a fake and their chosen warrior killed. The keep is razed and Galien is killed. Royce leaves with Arista and Esrahaddon to try and reclaim the real sword. Hadrian, Mauvin, and Fanen discover a trio of Seret knights (the bishop's personal enforcers) and defend themselves against them. In the fight, Fanen and Theron are killed and the Gilabrwyn returns. While Royce searches for the sword, Esrahaddon and Arista tap into the magic built into the tower. They use the tower to find the magical pendants given to the true heir of Novron and his protector, by Esrahaddon 1,000 years ago. Royce finds the sword broken in half and they return to the village. After a devastating fight that destroys most of the village Thrace plunges the broken sword into the Gilabrywn. Having countless people witness her kill the beast, the bishops have no choice but to name her Empress, but Thrace is left in a catatonic state after her father's death. Saldur decides to rule the newly minted Empire through her and annexes every kingdom except Melengar, as his plan to implant a leader there loyal to him failed in the last book. The book ends with the threat of Melengar standing alone against the powerful new Empire.

=== Volume II: Rise of Empire ===
==== Book 3: Nyphron Rising ====
Rise of Empire picks up some time after the events of Theft of Swords. The newly minted Empire, under the regency of Bishop Saldur, is at war with Melengar.

The Empress Modina, formerly the young farm girl Thrace, has been kept out of sight of the populace, being treated as little more than a prisoner in her catatonic state. Through a series of dumb luck, a scullery maid is placed in charge of training the Empress. It is her kindness and compassion toward the young Empress that eventually helps Modina break through her numbness and start to become a person again.

Royce and Hadrian, meanwhile, have been employed by King Alric to provide valuable information to aid in the war against the Empire.

== Books ==
The Riyria Revelations series (2011 - 2012) was published before The Riyria Chronicles (2013 - present) but is set after it chronologically. Sullivan has recommended reading the two series in publication order.

1. Theft of Swords (contains The Crown Conspiracy and Avempartha) (January 2011)
2. Rise of Empire (contains Nyphron Rising and The Emerald Storm) (December 2011)
3. Heir of Novron (contains Wintertide and Percepliquis) (January 2012)

== Prequel ==
Sullivan has written a series of novels entitled The Riyria Chronicles that take place before the events in Riyria Revelations, following the early adventures of the two main protagonists, Royce Melborn and Hadrian Blackwater. The first two novels, The Crown Tower and The Rose and the Thorn, were released in August and September 2013. The third and fourth novels are The Death of Dulgath (2015) and The Disappearance of Winter's Daughter (2018).

== Adaptations ==
GraphicAudio has, since 2008, produced full-cast dramatised audio adaptations of Sullivan's entire Riyria bibliography.

== Reception ==
Critical reception for the series has been positive, with the Library Journal giving Theft of Swords praise and making it one of their 2011 "Best Books for Fantasy/Sci-Fi". SFFWorld also extended praise for the series, writing that Rise of Empire was "very appealing" while stating that the book did have some plot holes. In contrast, a negative review from Strange Horizons says the book "isn't, quite, the absolute worst book I've ever read".
