= Carol Berg =

American writer

- Born: 1948 (age 77–78)
- Education: Rice University; University of Colorado
- Occupation: Novelist
- Writing career
- Period: 2000–present
- Genres: Fantasy, Historical Fiction
- Website: textcrumbs.blogspot.com

Carol Berg (born 1948) is the author of fantasy novels, including the books from the Rai-Kirah series, Song of the Beast, the books from The Bridge of D'Arnath series, the Lighthouse novels, and Collegia Magica. She also writes the Chimera series under the pen name Cate Glass.

She won awards for the Books of the Rai-kirah, the Novels of the Collegia Magica, The Lighthouse Duet, and (as Cate Glass) the Chimera adventures.

Berg was born in Fort Worth, Texas, but made her home in Colorado. Berg holds a degree in mathematics from Rice University, and a degree in computer science from the University of Colorado. After she received her degree from Rice University, she taught high school science. Before writing full-time, she designed software. She lives in Colorado, and is the mother of three boys. After teaching in high school, she got her second degree from the University of Colorado.

== Bibliography ==
=== The Rai-Kirah series ===
1. Transformation (ISBN 0-451-45795-1) (2000)
2. Revelation (ISBN 0-451-45842-7) (2001)
3. Restoration (ISBN 0-451-45890-7) (2002)

=== The Bridge of D'Arnath series ===
1. Son of Avonar (ISBN 0-451-45962-8) (2004)
2. Guardians of the Keep (ISBN 0-451-46000-6) (2004)
3. The Soul Weaver (ISBN 0-451-46017-0) (2005)
4. Daughter of Ancients (ISBN 0-451-46042-1) (2005)

=== The Lighthouse Duet ===
1. Flesh and Spirit (ISBN 0-451-46088-X) (2007)
2. Breath and Bone (ISBN 0-451-46186-X) (2008), the winner of the 2008 Colorado Book Award and the 2009 Mythopoeic Fantasy Award

=== The Sanctuary Duet ===
In the same setting as The Lighthouse Duet.

1. Dust and Light (ISBN 0-451-41724-0) (ISBN 978-0451417244) (2014)
2. Ash and Silver (ISBN 0-451-41726-7) (ISBN 978-0451417268) (2015)

=== Novels of the Collegia Magica ===
1. The Spirit Lens (ISBN 0-451-46311-0) (2010)
2. The Soul Mirror (ISBN 0-451-46374-9) (2011), the winner of the 2011 Colorado Book Award
3. The Daemon Prism (ISBN 0-451-46434-6) (2012)

=== The Chimera series (as Cate Glass) ===
1. An Illusion of Thieves (ISBN 9781250311009) (2019)
2. A Conjuring of Assassins (ISBN 9781250311023) (2020)
3. A Summoning of Demons (ISBN 9781250311054) (2021)

=== Other works ===
1. Song of the Beast, fantasy standalone (ISBN 0-451-45923-7) (2003) and winner of the 2003 Colorado Book Award
2. "Unmasking", a novella set in the world of the Rai-kirah in the collection Elemental Magic (ISBN 978-0425217863) (2007)
3. "At Fenwick Faire", a gritty myth; in Broken Links, Mended Lives, RMFW Press (ISBN 978-0976022527) (2009)
4. "Seeds", a short story set in the kingdom of Navronne; in Blackguards: Tales of Assassins, Mercenaries and Rogues, Ragnarok Publications (ISBN 978-1941987063) (2015)
5. "The Heart's Coda," novelette follow-up to Song of the Beast; in Lace and Blade 4, Marion Zimmer Bradley Literary Trust (ISBN 9781938185519) (2018)

== Awards ==
- Finalist, (2001) Compton Crook Award, Transformation
- Finalist, (2000) Barnes & Noble Maiden Voyage Award, Transformation
- Finalist, (2002) Romantic Times Reviewers' Choice Award for Best Epic Fantasy, Restoration
- Winner, (2003) Colorado Book Award, Song of the Beast
- Winner, (2005) Geffen Award for Best Translated Fantasy, Transformation
- Finalist, (2006) RWA-FFP Prism Award for Best Romantic Fantasy, Daughter of Ancients
- Finalist, (2006) Colorado Book Award, Daughter of Ancients
- Finalist, (2008) Colorado Book Award, Flesh and Spirit
- Winner, (2009) Colorado Book Award, Breath and Bone
- Winner, (2009) Mythopoeic Fantasy Award for Adult Literature, Flesh and Spirit,Breath and Bone
- Finalist, (2010) Colorado Book Award, The Spirit Lens
- Winner, (2011) Colorado Book Award, The Soul Mirror
