= Regina's Song =

2002 novel by David and Leigh Eddings

- First edition
- Author: David Eddings
- Language: English
- Genre: Mystery
- Publisher: Del Rey
- Publication date: 2002
- Publication place: USA
- Media type: Print ( )
- Pages: 432 (hardback)
- ISBN: 0-345-55898-7
- OCLC: 51391708
- Preceded by: none
- Followed by: none

Regina's Song, written by David and Leigh Eddings, is a murder mystery novel, with some fantasy themes present as well. The story takes place in Seattle, Washington.

The story involves the murder of an identical twin. Regina and Renata are so identical that after their infant footprint records are lost, no one is certain which twin is which—even their own parents. Thus, when one of the twins is raped and killed, the authorities simply assume that it was the 'dominant' one: Regina. After years of psychotherapy, the surviving twin Renata tries to lead a normal life. She attends the same college as Mark, a family friend and surrogate big brother, who juggles his own course schedule and teaching responsibilities. While Mark keeps an eye on Renata, a series of petty criminals are found murdered in the area. Mark and his friends (Sylvia, Erika, Trish, James, and Charlie) eventually realize that Renata is responsible for the murders and is hunting down her sister's killer. Once she accomplishes her goal, Renata has a complete psychological breakdown; she does not know who or where she is, and she speaks exclusively in a secret language that the twins had invented when they were young. Renata is not taken to the police. Instead, she is stealthily placed into the care of a secretive abbey for the rest of her life.

== Critical reception ==
Publishers Weekly described it as a "fast-paced psychological thriller that's part ghost story" while adding that "many Eddings fans are likely to be disappointed to find this novel so removed from the authors' usual."
