= Nabila Jamshed =

Indian humanitarian, public speaker and author

- Education: Lady Shri Ram College
- Occupations: Novelist, humanitarian, and public speaker
- Writing career
- Period: Contemporary
- Genre: Fantasy
- Notable work: Wish upon a Time
- Notable awards: Goldman Sachs Global Leaders Award
- Website: www.nabilajamshed.net

Nabila Jamshed is an Indian public speaker, and author. She wrote the fantasy novel Wish Upon A Time - The Legendary Scimitar at the age of 19, when she was a final-year student at Lady Shri Ram College, University of Delhi. She has given nine TEDx talks, and currently works with the United Nations.

== Bibliography ==
- Jamshed, N (2007). Wish Upon A Time - The Legendary Scimitar. ISBN 978-81-7202-663-9.
