= Song of Albion =

Trilogy of fantasy novels by Stephen Lawhead

Cover of The Paradise War by Daniel Horne

The Song of Albion is a trilogy of fantasy novels by American writer Stephen Lawhead, consisting of The Paradise War (1991), The Silver Hand (1992) and The Endless Knot (1993). The series combines Christian religious themes with Celtic mythology and tells the tale of a pair of university students who stumble into an alternate world (Albion). It has been continuously in print for over twenty years and remains one of Lawhead's most popular series. The trilogy was published in an omnibus edition in 2014.

The series has been illustrated by a number of artists including Rodney Matthews, Daniel Horne, Anne Yvonne Gilbert, and Peter Holt.

== Plot ==
=== The Paradise War ===
The book begins with Simon Rawnson, a British native and his American friend, Lewis Gillies, both graduate students at University of Oxford, embarking on a journey to a farm in Scotland where a legendary Ice Age creature known as an aurochs has been supposedly recovered. While expecting it to be a hoax, Lewis is startled to find that not only is the aurochs real but that Simon disappears after entering a cairn nearby. After enduring weeks of uncertainty and doubt, Lewis encounters the eccentric Professor Nettles who helps him understand what has happened: Simon had travelled into the world of the faery folk known as Tuatha de Danann. Although skeptical of this, Lewis eventually comes to believe it, and returns to the cairn with Nettles where he himself stumbles into Tuatha de Danann (otherwise known as Albion). In Albion, he encounters Simon again, who saves his life and helps him to be accepted into the court of King Meldryn. Llew is sent to the island school of Ynys Sci to be trained as a warrior and is gradually assimilated into the culture and people of Albion. Llew travels with Tegid to a gathering of the bards, where the great evil of Albion's world realm, Cythrawl, is released. With the help of the dying bard, Ollathir, the Cythrawl is bound and banished. Furious at having been defeated, the Cythrawl unleashes Lord Nudd, an evil king's son from ages past to destroy Albion and its peoples. Having gained leadership over the evil monsters of the underworld, he has begun leading this Demon Horde in a campaign of destruction. Simon, now Siawn Hy, has worked his way into Prince Meldron's service and became the leader of the feared Wolf Pack, Meldron's personal guard. Eventually, it is revealed that Simon was manipulating the king's arrogant son into pursuing a kingship by heritage, rather than the established and true rite of selection by the Chief Bard, Tegid.

After Lord Nudd has surrounded the king's northern stronghold, Lewis (now Llyd) undertakes a desperate bid to locate the Song of Albion, the only hope of stopping Nudd, beneath the palace. He succeeds with Tegid in finding it, only to discover that the Sleeping Bard who sings the Song has been murdered. It is discovered that the Bard instilled the Song into the stones used to crush him to death, and Llew and Tegid are able to use these stones to release the Song so that Nudd and his army are decimated by its power. Following this, Llew is made the new champion to King Meldryn, but Meldryn is murdered immediately afterward by Paladyr. In the wake of this Llew tries to force Simon to return to their own world so as to prevent him from causing more trouble, but Simon escapes, and Lewis encounters Nettles once more with a set of researchers bent on discovering Albion for themselves. The book ends with Lewis returning to Albion to seek Simon out and bring him back.

=== The Silver Hand ===
Llew returns to Albion to bring Simon/Siawn Hy back to their own world. However, Siawn is alert to this now and will not be so easily tricked again. He backs Meldron's claim to the throne by right of heritage, but Tegid challenges this with his own declaration of choice in Llew as the next king. The surprised Llew willingly goes along with this, but when Tegid publicly performs the rite of kingship with Llew, Meldron declares them outlaws and has them arrested. They escape and make their way to the bard's ancient meeting mound, where they hope to establish their support for Llew's claim to the throne. Meldron, however, brazenly attacks the bards when they meet and kills all of them save Tegid and Llew. He has Tegid blinded and cuts off Llew's hand, ostensibly to destroy any claim he might have to the throne, as a maimed man cannot be king. He then sends them out to sea in a small boat to perish (so as to claim he knew nothing of what happened to them). The boat, however, returns to shore and the two men move north. There they establish an enclave of those who either support Llew or are fleeing Meldron's campaign of destruction across the land, led by the feared Wolf Pack.

Because of the link between the land and the kingship, Meldron's usurping the throne has caused the land to sicken. The water begins to turn poisonous, then caustic and deadly. After a large settlement has formed with Llew and Tegid leading them, Meldron arrives and take hostages of the people. Llew surrenders himself to arrange their release. Meldron throws Llew into the corrupting waters of the lake, expecting this will kill him. Instead, Llew is granted the Silver Hand through divine intervention, emerging from the water unscathed. The shock of this causes Meldron to capsize his boat, sending him into the deadly waters, where he dies horribly. With Llew's hand restored, he is no longer maimed and his kingship is assured.

The Wolf Pack is captured and tried before Llew's council, where they are sentenced to death. Siawn, however, escapes when his turn comes at last, but as he reaches the water's edge, he is struck by a spear thrust. He seems to disappear as he falls into the water, and it is apparent that he has returned to Lewis's world, where it is assumed he died of his injury.

=== The Endless Knot ===
Nettles, who had joined Llew in Albion during the events of the previous book, returns to his own world, urging Llew to come as well. Llew, however, feels he still has a life and purpose in Albion and decides to stay. He marries the daughter of a warrior chieftess, Goewyn, and begins his rule as High King, making the rounds to the various villages and provinces on the Isle of the Mighty. This idyllic life is interrupted when his queen is spirited away. When it is clear that the queen was taken to the Foul Land, a cursed land across the sea, Tegid warns Llew that he must stay behind and allow the rescue mission to proceed without him, based on an ancient curse triggered when any High King leaves the Isle of the Mighty. Llew refuses to remain, however, and joins the group in sailing for the Tyr Aflan, the Foul Land.

The Foul Land was apparently once a glorious kingdom much like Albion, but its people apparently committed a terrible crime which Tegid is unable to recount. The land is populated by terrible monsters and creatures that threaten the group as they move through it. Their first danger is from a swarm of large, tick-like creatures that emerge in darkness to suck the life from their victims. After narrowly evading these, they move through the dense, dark forest at the heart of the land, where they encounter the Wyrm, a dragon-like beast that kills several of Llew's men before the bards' awen overtakes him, and he slays the beast. Finally they emerge from the forest and discover a vast mining operation in which worker from the manifest world coerced to labor as slaves. Surprisingly, Nettles arrives to warn Llew that Simon survived his wounds. He had teamed with his father to exploit the resources of Albion using modern mining equipment and machines, along with guards with guns. Llew and his men manage to eliminate most of these, but the Brazen Man, a mysterious figure with a bronze suit of armor, arrives and delivers him a gruesome package containing the head of Nettles, whom he apparently killed. Llew finds his wife in a strange tower, where he finds the Brazen Man is none other than Simon, who had sprung a trap for him. Llew's reunion with his wife is short-lived, and he is forced to surrender to Simon to spare her. Simon immediately kills Llew with a knife, thus bringing the curse to bear.

However, this action brings the Song of Albion to life, freeing it from its stone form. It proceeds to burn away everything in the land, along with all its people. Miraculously, Llew's companions are all restored, along with the peoples of the Foul Land (no longer cursed). But Llew's body, while restored including its hand, is still dead, and he is brought back home and interred in a cairn built by Tegid. His spirit is brought back to his old world, with his body as well, and he emerges from the cairn (in a different location than the original cairn he entered through) where he is met by Simon's former fiancé, Susannah, who had been helping Nettles. She gives him comfort and helps him to adjust to life outside of Albion again, and convinces him to put his experiences in writing. The series comes full circle, ending with the same words with which it began: "It all began with the aurochs..."

== Major characters ==
=== Lewis Gillies/Lyd ap Dicter/Llew Silver Hand ===
Lewis starts out a complacent graduate student in Celtic studies at Oxford University only to fall into an extended period of uncertainty and self-doubt after seeing his friend Simon disappear. When he enters into Albion himself he is hardly a fitting companion for the powerful fighters he finds himself embroiled with in the courts of King Meldryn but after years of training and life in Albion, he grows into a mighty and respected warrior with a new name, Llew. He is eventually selected by Tegid Tathal, the chief bard, to be the next king, but Prince Meldron usurps the throne instead, with Simon backing him. Meldron cuts off Llew's hand, knowing that a maimed man cannot be king. Llew flees with Tegid to establish a settlement in the north, where he gathers a collection of followers and refugees from Meldron's destructive wrath. Divine intervention grants Llew a new hand of silver, gaining him the name "Silver Hand" and solidifying his place as king when Meldron is killed. He marries his true love but is forced to lead a rescue party to the Foul Land when his wife is kidnapped some years later.

Lewis dies at the hand of the Brazen Man (revealed to be Simon). However, his sacrifice causes the Song of Albion to be unleashed upon the land in full force and cleanse it of its corruption and evil, and so restores balance to the two worlds. His "death" in Albion forces him back into his own world, where he writes of his experiences.

=== Simon/Siawn Hy ===
Simon is Lewis's best friend and roommate at Oxford at the start of the series. He disappears into Albion early on after entering a cairn in Scotland during sunset. It is later implied that this was his plan all along to escape the tedium of life in England. He becomes a respected member of Meldryn's army after several years and ascends to the leadership of Prince Meldron's personal guard, the Wolf Pack, also changing his name to Siawn Hy. Simon is a Machiavellian opportunist who exhibits selfish ambitions from the start, who thinks nothing of jilting his girlfriend, Susannah, without telling her of his intentions, and while he initially assists Lewis when he first stumbles into Albion himself, he quickly gains a ruthless ambition which leads to their becoming lethal enemies. He instills Prince Meldron with the idea of succeeding his father instead of following the proper course of succession through bardic choice, and eventually succeeds in having King Meldryn murdered. Simon assists Meldron in his brutal campaign to rule Albion, and does not hesitate to kill or brutalize any who oppose him. He is ultimately responsible for hundreds, if not thousands of deaths and very nearly succeeds in his plan to rule from behind the scenes. He is thwarted when Meldron is killed, and is grievously wounded before returning to his own world. He recovers and returns to the world of Albion after making a deal with greedy industrialists to strip-mine the Foul Land and exploit its resources. He also takes on the persona of the Brazen Man, and engineers a revenge plot against Llew by abducting his queen and luring Llew to the Foul Land. After dealing Llew a fatal blow, Simon meets his end when the Song of Albion restores the land to its former glory by burning away all its corrupting influences (including Simon and his cohorts).

=== King Meldryn Mawr ===
A wise and benevolent ruler of Albion who accepts both Simon and Lewis into his court. Originally the High King of Albion, he is assassinated by Paladyr at the end of The Paradise War in a conspiracy involving his son, Prince Meldron, and Siawn Hy.

=== Tegid Tathal ===
The Chief Bard to King Meldryn in The Paradise War, Tegid Tathal becomes Llew's mentor and guide in the ways and language of his people, and travels with him throughout much of the series. He assists Llew in locating the Sleeping Bard who keeps the Song of Albion, and then helps him to use the stones containing the Song to defeat Lord Nudd. After the king's murder, he tries to proclaim Llew as successor to the kingship, but Meldron usurps the throne and Tegid becomes a hunted man with Llew. When Tegid tries to gather his fellow bards to oppose Meldron, he is helpless to prevent their slaughter and is subsequently blinded by Meldron in a cruel ironic twist; the seer is now blind. However, Tegid receives an awen, which allows him to see the world through his mind's eye, at least some of the time. Tegid is a stalwart ally to Llew, even when that companionship is dangerous, and demonstrates bravery on many occasions. He is presented as having a wisdom gained from being attuned to the world around him. When Meldron is killed and Llew's kingship firmly established, his eyes are healed by the cleansed waters of the land. He installs Llew as the High King and advises him on his rule. He also travels to the Foul Land with him, where he witnesses the restoration of both Albion and Tir Aflan. Tegid appears to be directly responsible for sending Llew back to his own world after Llew's "death" in Albion by having him interred in the cairn, but to what extent he understands this is not explicitly stated.

=== Prince Meldron ===
Meldron is the son of King Meldryn. He seems a dutiful son when first seen but gradually breaks with his father after falling in with Simon, who tells him of the way kings are succeeded in his world by their sons. Meldron eventually enters into a conspiracy to murder his father and usurp the throne. This act, which disrupts the normal rite of kingship, causes the land itself to begin to sicken, causing the soil to grow fallow and the waters to become caustic and undrinkable. He attempts repeatedly to capture Llew and Tegid, and kills the bardic council along with hundreds of innocents in his campaign to rule. Eventually he catches up with Llew and his followers, where he tries once and for all to eliminate his rival. In the process he is killed himself when he falls into the corrupting waters of the lake surrounding Llew's stronghold and dies an agonizing death.

=== Nettles ===
Professor Nettles is an expert on Celtic folklore and is aware of the existence of Tuatha de Danann, apparently long before either Simon or Lewis. He befriends Lewis when he finds him dazedly wandering the streets in the weeks following Simon's disappearance. He helps Lewis to come to terms with his belief in Tuatha de Danann (Albion) and the role he will play in it. He is also instrumental in explaining to Lewis about the "time between times" in which people can cross over between the worlds, such as dawn or sunset. His role is as a mentor and guide, and he assists Lewis with returning to the cairn where Simon disappeared (leading to Lewis also going to Albion). Nettles takes it upon himself to protect Albion from those who would exploit it, and in doing so he joins a set of researchers who are investigating the cairn in Scotland with the idea of watching them. He later appears with them in Albion to join Llew at the settlement. After Meldron's death he urges Llew to return with him to their own world, so as to "restore the balance." Llew refuses and Nettles returns alone. Little is known of what happened to him during this time, but he reappears in the Foul Land, apparently through the same gateway used by the industrialists that Simon was working with. He warns Llew that Simon survived his wounds and is setting a trap for him. Nettles is not seen alive after this; the Brazen Man delivers his head to Llew shortly afterward.
