= Alexander Mazin =

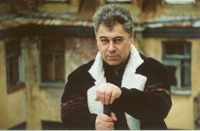
- Born: 1959 (age 66–67); Zaporizhia, Ukraine
- Occupation: Novelist
- Writing career
- Genres: Science fiction Fantasy; Alternate history
- Website: mazin-home.narod.ru

Alexander Vladimirovich Mazin (Russian: Александр Владимирович Мазин) is a Ukrainian-born Russian writer, poet, and songwriter, specializing in the genres of science fiction, fantasy, and alternate history.

Born in 1959, in Zaporizhia, Mazin graduated from the Leningrad Lensoviet Institute of Technology. During the late 80s, he was a member of the authors' studio Nast. He worked for the theater for several years, participating in such projects as the Star of Bethlehem rock opera and The Wizard of the Emerald City musical. In 1990, Mazin published his first and only poetry collection, titled The Path to the Mountain Heart. From 1993, he has written mostly novels.

== Bibliography ==
- Inquisitor series:
  - I, Inquisitor (1996) — his name is Andrei Laskovin. He has a brown belt in karate. While his primary profession is that of an electrical engineer, the times have forced him to become a guard in the mafia-like agency known as Helmet. However, when his brother and friend are crippled by a bunch of thugs, Andrei decides he has had enough. From now on, he stops playing by others' rules and declares his own war. For justice. So that he does not have to fear anymore. No fear of others' power and that of his own.
  - Right for Vengeance (2000) — Andrei Laskovin and Father Egori survive a car bomb. Andrei once again chooses the path of the warrior, the path of death. This time, however, he is faced with not only the mafia but a man calling himself Father Constantine, who is really a sorcerer hiding behind the mask of a saint. Behind Andrei is a woman he loves.
  - Fire for the Inquisitor (1998) — evil is unpredictable and multi-sided, and no one man, not even a true hero, has the power to stop it. For a real victory, being a karate master and a crack shot is not enough.
  - Absolute Evil (2002) — a bloodthirsty gang of satanists forms a cult of Evil in the city, recruiting more and more psychos, drug addicts, sadists, murderers, and power-hungry despots. This crazed crowd frightens the city folks with their bloody orgies. A pair of lovers, Daria and Yuri, are pulled into the maelstrom of these events.
  - Blind Orpheus (2000) — there are five of them. But only one can cross over the threshold of death. Modern sorcerers and a modern Inquisitor join to fight a common enemy.
- Barbarians (AKA Roman Eagle) series:
  - Barbarians (2001) — after a short-term failure of its on-board systems, the spaceship Soyuz TM-M-4 conducts an emergency landing in… the 3rd century AD. From that moment on, cosmonauts Gennady Cherepanov and Alexey Korshunov find themselves at the center of violent and merciless events of the past. Scythians, barbarians, savages… They were considered furious and greedy. But they called themselves Great Ones and values luck most of all in their leaders. Cherepanov is taken prisoner in battle, and Korshunov remains alone in this world, alien to him. Intelligence and bravery, coldbloodiness and luck help him earn the barbarians' respect and become their chieftain. Who were they really, the future conquerors of Rome? Who were they, the predecessors, and possibly even ancestors of the Slavs? Barbarians…
  - Roman Eagle (2002) — it is the 3rd century AD. The great Roman Empire is nearing its end. Just over a century is left before it falls under barbarian fists. But when the first of the so-called barracks emperors the half-Barbarian Maximinus Thrax puts on the imperial purple, Rome is still an empire. Great and powerful… This is a true story of the dusk of this great nation. The days before the fall of Eternal Rome as seen through the eyes of our contemporaries, one of which managed to become the chieftain of the bloodthirsty barbarians, while the other donned the armor of a Roman legionary under the silver eagle of the Roman Empire.
  - Price of the Empire (2003) — a man once known as Alexey Korshunov, now called Alaseia the Heavenly Warrior, leads thousands of barbarians to invade the great Roman Empire. The hearts of the Germanics, Scythians, the ancestors of the Slavs know no fear. They know only bravery and greed. The walls of Roman cities are crumbling, the razed mansions are burning, and the Barbarian ships are heavily laden with loot. The Barbarians are about to meet the legionary cohorts of the Empire. They are led by a Primus Pilus named Gennadius Paulus. A former fighter pilot in the Russian Air Force, lieutenant colonel Gennady Cherepanov has already lived through the collapse of one empire, his home country, and he is not about to repeat the experience. What price will he have to pay to save Rome?
- Varyag series:
  - Varyag (2001) — Sergei Duharev, an ex-commando, did not think that a regular party with friends will end for him in 10th century Russia. Kiev is ruled by Prince Igor. Polotsk is under Prince Rogvolod. The Vikings slip in from the North, while the Pechenegs push in from the South. It is the time for change, for Russia and Sergei Duharev. A foreigner spoiled by civilization, he suddenly reveals true character and courage. This violent and merciless world becomes home for Sergei, where he for the first time experiences a passion for life and gains a loving woman, friends, and relatives. He becomes an equal among the powerful.
  - Place of Battle (2001) — the last year of Prince Igor's rule. Sergei Duharev serves as a commander of the flying squad of Varyags in the Wild Fields. The Khazars, the Pechenegs, and the Byzantines — all wish to claim these steppes for themselves. The Khazars want them to rob others, the Pechenegs need them to trade, and the Byzantines… They couldn't care less who owns the steppes. As long as that someone does not threaten Byzantium. That is why they pay gold to make the Russians fight the Pechenegs, and the Hungarians fight the Khazars. The Byzantines know that their gold will, one way or another, return to the Empire… unless it gets lost on the way. A warrior does not choose whether or not to fight. He will fight because war is his life, his purpose. But a true warrior chooses his place of battle.
  - Knyaz (2005) — Sergei Duharev is a warlord and a mentor of the young Prince Sviatoslav, who has conquered the Khazars and extended the borders of the Kiev Princedom from the Caspian Sea to the Black Sea. There has not been a military commander born this great since the days of Attila the Hun.
  - Hero (2006) — as part of his agreement with the Byzantine Emperor Nikephoros II, Prince Sviatoslav departs on a military campaign against the Bulgars. Sergei Duharev follows his prince into battle. Meanwhile, a large Pecheneg horde approaches the capital of Sviatoslav's empire.
- Fargal, the World of Ashshur (AKA The Emperor) series:
  - The Emperor's Path (2003) — when a traveling circus picked up a lost boy on a side of the road, only two people in the World of the Four Empires knew of his fate: a man who became a werewolf and a wizard who has not been human for 300 years. The boy will have to go from a criminal and gladiator to a brilliant general and commander-in-chief of the strongest military in the world. But fate changes: a hero rises, and a hero falls. It can change just as much as the monarchs' favor. There is only one way to permanently get rid of their arbitrariness — to wear a crown oneself.
  - The Emperor's Throne (1996) — sixteen years passed since Fargal rose to the throne of Carnagria. The Emperor rules the country with a strong and just hand, not expecting any surprises. However, the appearance of a young man, who was raised by Samerian highlanders, in the capital signals the start of a plot by a mysterious wizard who serves the serpent god Ash. On the way to quell an uprising in one of his provinces, Fargal vanishes, and a double appears to take his place.
- The Dragon of Kong series:
  - The Sleeping Dragon (1999) — millennia have passed since the catastrophe which destroyed the ancient Mahd-Shagosh Empire. All that is left are ruins and rare artifacts, which are highly sought after by wizards. Four friends arrive from the Northern Empire to the port city of Farang: three warriors, traveling incognito, and a woman, who is not really a woman. Of this group, one of the men is destined to be a redeeming sacrifice, though he does not know it, another is gifted with invulnerability, and the third man is a Vagar, a little person, who is three feet tall. Out of all three warriors, the latter is the most dangerous one. The four travelers must travel East to West across the nation of Kong, the people of which do not like the Empire, cross the mountains, as well as another country, of which nobody knows anything, and enter the Cursed Lands. There they have to find and kill an immortal demon. That is the goal of the warriors. However, the one who is with them pursues her own goal. Compared to that, her companions' demon hunt is little more than child's play.
  - The Dragon Awakes (AKA The Black Hunter; 1999) — not all heroes have made it this far. They have changed, especially Santi. The young man slowly learns of his own magical power and enjoys it as must as the Women of Urngur enjoy love. But the wheels of Destiny continue to turn, and the Past again enters the Present. And the Sleeping Dragon awakes…
  - The White Blade (2000) — the nation of Kong is in the middle of a civil war. The collision between the North and the South, the invasion of Empire, the raid of the pirate armada, the insidiousness of the wizards — all these things fall on the Blessed Kong. And the Sleeping Dragon is finally awake!
  - The Dead Sky (2002) — only two crewmen survive the sinking of a Northern Empire trade ship: Danila and Rouge. To survive, they will have to walk thousands of miles across a land where slow death awaits any foreigner. The Northerners are not aware that they have become a part of a conspiracy to assassinate the Emperor and take power on all the continents. Thirty years have passed since the civil war in Kong. New heroes are born, but it is too early to retire the old ones. The time has come for all the heroes to save the world.
- The Little Girl and Karlsson (AKA The Hunt for the Elf) series, co-authored by Anna Gurova:
  - The Little Girl and Karlsson (2005) — her name is Katya. She is seventeen. She came to St. Petersburg to go to college. His name is Karlsson. His age is unknown. He catches pigeons with his hands, speaks Old English, and can scale walls. At first, she thinks that he is a hitman. Then, a secret agent. The reality turns out to be much scarier, and way more interesting.
  - The Little Girl and Karlsson II, or "Silence, Food!" (AKA The Little Girl and Karlsson: The Swedish Voyage; 2006) — the hunt for the elf continues. Karlsson and his biker friends go to Stockholm to finish off his old nemesis Rotgar. But the immortal elf is not a fool, and the question remains of who will finish off whom. Meanwhile, Rotgar's people begin to hunt Katya and her friends in St. Petersburg.
- Panic-Upgrade series:
  - Panic-Upgrade. Blood of the Ancients (2007) — Oleg Saianov is a lucky man. Unlucky people usually cannot buy tropical islands. However, Lady Luck is a very temperamental woman. The lucky owner of this tropical wonder soon becomes a witness to that. Myths coming to life, a true pagan death, and a pure animal passion in this great and merciless world, where only one thing can grant you the right to live — the blood of the ancients.
  - Panic-Upgrade. God's Brother (2008) — the wonderful tropical island has caught the eye of the leader of African rebels. Now the island is home to a military base, completed with hundreds of soldiers, a powerful air defense system, and an armory. It is there that they bring the kidnapped girlfriend of the sole heir to the late owner of the island. He arrives to the island, along with an ex-GRU officer and a sorcerer's son, who is a fearless Maasai warrior. There are only three of them against hundreds of soldiers. However, there is a third power on the island, deadly to the all who were born human.
- Time for Change series:
  - Time for Change (2005) — Artem Griva, formerly an agent of the Russian Imperial Intelligence, now works for the International Committee for Prevention of Illegal Scientific Research. During a routine mission to shut down one of the Pentagon's top-secret research facilities, Griva encounters a being, which causes anyone who looks at it to go insane and die. However, Artem survives…
  - The Morning of Judgment Day (2007) — Artem Griva takes part in a monumental experiment: he is to be sent to the Stone Age to the maiden Africa to find the reason why his own world has gone insane.
- Hacker series:
  - Black Shooter (2005) — Alexei Shelehov is an heir to a vast fortune. He studies in England, while his guardian takes care of his late father's industrial empire. Six months are left until Alexei's eighteenth birthday, at which point he will become the legal owner of the fortune and the company… No, he won't. They are no longer his. Also, Alexei accidentally witnesses one of the many crimes of his guardian. The victim was a young girl, also an heir to a fortune. In one day, the young aristocrat becomes a prey, hunted by one of the most powerful men in Russia. But Alexei has a powerful weapon — information. He also has friends: his own as well as his late father's. No, there will not be a hunt; there will be war.
  - Black Shooter II (2005) — a sniper's bullet, which interrupted a wedding ceremony, has radically altered the situation in the city of Shirgorod. Alexei Shelehov and his team are a new force, which everyone must accept. Accept… or destroy. But destroying Alexei is not that simple anymore, not when he has such powerful allies. However, Alexei does have two Achilles' heels: his youth and a girl he loves. The war continues!
- The Cleaner series:
  - The Cleaner (2002) — when Valera Vasiliev's girlfriend is kidnapped in the middle of Nevsky Avenue, he realizes that the world has changed. No longer is there a place in it for a nice, smart guy like Valera. But he is not one who is content to be thrown overboard. But to earn and defend his place on the top deck of the "ship of life", Valera Vasiliev must learn to fight to the death.
  - The Cleaner II (2007) — take a hostage, rescue a hostage, steal money, return money. Such is the everyday life of Valera Vasiliev and his friends, all employees of a small firm for performing forceful acts to order. However, Valera's bright future turns dark when the firm's CEO throws eight kilos of heroin into the river. A rookie like Valera should have been the first to die, as he has barely learned to fight and shoot. But even when all his friends are already dead, Valera Vasiliev remains alive. The only thing that saves him is the fact that, in his past life, he was not a commando but a scientist with a degree in chemistry.
- Earthshaker (1994) — the strange and mysterious world of Asta. A world where all men carry swords, where skies are filled with dragons, where the bearded dwarven Tuors are hard at work in their subterranean mines. This world almost real and somehow familiar.
- Panic (1996)
- Goblin Trap (2006) — he robs from the robbers and kills killers. He appears from underground and returns there to escape assassins. He is merciless, fearless, and uncatchable. His enemies call him Goblin, but he likes to call himself Louse.
