= Stephen R. Lawhead =

UK-based American writer (born 1950)

- Born: July 2, 1950 (age 76); Kearney, Nebraska, U.S.
- Education: Kearney High School; Kearney State College (BA); Northern Baptist Theological Seminary; Wheaton College
- Occupation: Writer
- Spouse: Alice Slaikeu (m. 1972)
- Children: 2
- Parent(s): Robert Eugene Lawhead; Lois Rowena Bissell Lawhead
- Writing career
- Genres: Fantasy; science fiction; historical fiction; children's literature; non-fiction
- Website: www.stephenlawhead.com

Stephen R. Lawhead (born July 7, 1950) is an American writer known for his works of fantasy, science fiction, and historical fiction, particularly Celtic historical fiction. He has written over 28 novels and numerous children's and non-fiction books.

== Biography ==
He was born to Robert Eugene Lawhead and Lois Rowena Bissell Lawhead at Good Samaritan Hospital, Kearney, Nebraska. In 1950, Lawhead graduated from Kearney High School and entered Kearney State College as an Art major. In 1969, while at Kearney State College, he wrote a weekly humour column for the college newspaper and was a frequent contributor of poetry and short stories to The Shore Anthology and The Antler. He paid his way through college largely through playing lead guitar in a college rock band named Mother Rush. Lawhead met Alice Slaikeu in 1971, and married her in 1972. He graduated from Kearney State College in 1973 with BA in Art and then enrolled in Northern Baptist Theological Seminary. During this time he also enrolled in a number of writing courses at nearby Wheaton College. His professional writing career began with five years as an editor and staff writer for Campus Life magazine. In 1980, Lawhead became the manager of the successful Christian rock act DeGarmo and Key and formed his own record company, Ariel Records. The demise of Ariel Records in 1981 prompted the beginning of Lawhead's fiction-writing career.

In 1981, Lawhead began to write novels, initially fantasy and science fiction, completing his first trilogy, the "Dragon King trilogy". In 1986, he moved to Oxford, England, to do research for The Pendragon Cycle, a reinterpretation of the legend of King Arthur in a Celtic setting combined with elements of Atlantis. Heavily rooted in the original Celtic source material which gave rise to the later and more familiar versions of the Arthurian legend, the series was positively reviewed by conservative historian Bradley J. Birzer for its creative retelling of the Arthur legend and historical credibility.

The first book in the series, Taliesin, won the Evangelical Christian Publishers Association's Gold Medallion Award for Fiction in 1988. Lawhead's research for The Pendragon Cycle sparked an interest in Celtic history and culture, especially Celtic Christianity, topics which have featured prominently in his work ever since.

"The Song of Albion" trilogy prompted a return to England (Lawhead having left in 1987). This iw series of books set between the Celtic Otherworld and present-day Britain. In the 1990s, he published Byzantium, a work of pure historical fiction, followed by "The Celtic Crusades" trilogy, set at the time of the Crusades, and then Avalon: The Return of King Arthur, a stand-alone related to the Pendragon Cycle.

In 2003, Lawhead published the novel Patrick: Son of Ireland, a fictionalized account of the early years of Saint Patrick. In 2006, he published Hood, the first book in the King Raven Trilogy – a retelling of the Robin Hood legend, transferred to Wales. In 2008, the second book in the trilogy, Scarlet, won a Christy Award in the category of Visionary Fiction.

In 2003, Lawhead received an honorary doctorate from the University of Nebraska at Kearney.

Lawhead and his wife live in Oxford. He has two sons, Ross Lawhead, and Drake Lawhead.

== Works ==
=== Adult fiction ===
Dragon King trilogy:

- In the Hall of the Dragon King (1982)
- The Warlords of Nin (1983)
- The Sword and the Flame (1984)

Empyrion Saga:

- Empyrion I: The Search for Fierra (1985)
- Empyrion II: The Siege of Dome (1986)

The Pendragon Cycle:

- Aurelia (prequel; 2025)

1. Taliesin (1987)
2. Merlin (1988)
3. Arthur (1989)
4. Pendragon (1994)
5. Grail (1997)
6. Avalon (1999; AKA Avalon: The Return of King Arthur)

Song of Albion:

- The Paradise War (1991) (Illustrated by Rodney Matthews, Daniel Horne in 1993, Anne Yvonne Gilbert in 1998, and Peter Holt in 2001)
- The Silver Hand (1992) (Illustrated by Anne Yvonne Gilbert in 1998)
- The Endless Knot (1993) (Illustrated by Anne Yvonne Gilbert in 1998)

The Celtic Crusades:

- The Iron Lance (1998)
- The Black Rood (2000)
- The Mystic Rose (2001)

King Raven Trilogy:

- Hood (2006)
- Scarlet (2007)
- Tuck (2009)

Hero (With Ross Lawhead):

- City of Dreams (2003)
- Rogue Nation (unpublished)
- World Without End (unpublished)

Bright Empires:

- The Skin Map (2010)
- The Bone House (2011)
- The Spirit Well (2012)
- The Shadow Lamp (2013)
- The Fatal Tree (2014)

Eirlandia:

- In the Region of the Summer Stars (2018)
- In the Land of the Everliving (2019)
- In the Kingdom of All Tomorrows (2020)

Stand-alone novels:

- Dream Thief (1983)
- Byzantium (1996)
- Patrick: Son of Ireland (2003)

=== Children's fiction ===
The Brown Ears Books:

- Brown Ears: The Adventures of a Lost-and-Found Rabbit (1988)
- Brown Ears at Sea: More Adventures of a Lost-and-Found Rabbit (1990)

The Howard Books

- Howard Had A Spaceship (1986)
- Howard Had A Submarine (1987)
- Howard Had A Hot Air Balloon (1988)
- Howard Had A Shrinking Machine (1988)

The Riverbank Series

- The Tale of Jeremy Vole (1990)
- The Tale of Timothy Mallard (1990)
- The Tale of Annabelle Hedgehog (1990)

=== Non-fiction ===
- The Ultimate College Student Handbook (1989; later published as The Total Guide to College Life) – With Alice Lawhead
- Rock on Trial: Pop Music and Its Role in Our Lives (1989)
- Rock of This Age: The Real & Imagined Dangers of Rock Music (1987)
- Pilgrim's Guide to the New Age (1986) – With Alice Lawhead
- Judge for Yourself (1985) – With Alice Lawhead
- The Phoenix Factor: Surviving and Growing Through Personal Crisis (1985; later published as Up from the Ashes) – With Karl A. Slaikeu
- Turn Back the Night: A Christian Response to Popular Culture (1985)
- Welcome to the Family: How to Find a Home with Other Believers (1982)
- Rock Reconsidered: A Christian Looks at Contemporary Music (1981)
- After You Graduate: A Guide to Life After High School (1978)
- Decisions! Decisions! Decisions! What to Do When You Can't Make Up Your Mind (1978)

=== Books contributed to ===
Lawhead has also contributed essays or chapters to several books. His essay "J.R.R. Tolkien: Master of Middle-earth", which describes the impact J. R. R. Tolkien's writings had on him, is featured in the following titles:

- More Than Words: Contemporary Writers on the Works That Shaped Them (2002) (previously published as Reality and the Vision (1990) and The Classics We've Read, The Difference They've Made (1993)) – Compiled by Philip Yancey, edited by James C. Schaap
- Tolkien: A Celebration (1999) – Edited by Joseph Pearce

Lawhead has contributed to one fictional compilation, writing a chapter in the serial mystery novel Carnage at Christhaven (1989 – ed. William Griffin).
