= Niel Hancock =

American fantasy writer (1941–2011)

Niel Hancock (January 8, 1941 – May 7, 2011) was an American fantasy writer most famous for authoring the Circle of Light series and creating the fictional universe of Atlanton Earth.

After being out of print for several years, his novels were reprinted by Tor Books. Hancock's fantasy books are grouped into three sets of four books each. A stand-alone novel, Dragon Winter, is set in the same fictional universe, but not explicitly part of the larger storyline.

Hancock wrote high fantasy marketed for adults, but his works contain straightforward plots and tropes such as anthropomorphic animals more traditionally found in children's literature. For this reason, his works enjoy a great degree of popularity among younger readers as well. Containing spiritual overtones similar to Ursula K. Le Guin, C. S. Lewis, and J. R. R. Tolkien, Hancock's books emphasize Buddhism and Eastern religious motifs. His books were released at a time when interest in high fantasy was at a peak, and very little writing in that genre existed. Straddling the gap between young adult and adult fantasy, Hancock's books have remained popular well after their original publication. As the genre expanded in the 1970s, however, contemporary interest in his books waned and they came to be regarded as "commodified fantasy" employing the quest template from Richard Adams' Watership Down.

Like Lewis' Narnia series, the Atlanton Earth novels were not published in the chronological order of the events in the fantasy world itself. The first set, Circle of Light, is the last to occur in the chronology. The second set, The Wilderness of Four, is the earliest. The final set, The Windemeir Circle, is in the middle. Dragon Winter is set some time after the second set, although it is the most ambiguous of the novels because it does not belong to a set.

As an early contributor to the mass-market fantasy genre, Hancock's fate is similar to his contemporary Elizabeth H. Boyer in that his books required the reader to be interested in a specialized area of study (in this case, Buddhist philosophy) in order to fully appreciate the books, and thus he did not find the sort of wide acceptance which would have given him a more prominent place as a pioneer in the genre.

He died in Deming, New Mexico.

== Thematic elements ==
Hancock's approach to the high fantasy genre has been held to separate him from other authors. While other authors are merely influenced by Eastern beliefs (such as Le Guin), Hancock's fantasy was constructed to explicitly include Buddhist concepts of moving through cycles of time and rebirth. The river "Calix Stay" of his books is very similar to the river out of samsara in the Dhammapada. Characters cross this river into another world, but are soon reborn back into their lower world to work out their karma. The books use the framework of the traditional fantasy quest, but this quest is often secondary to the real plot, which centers on the struggle to escape samsara in the fantasy world. The plot is often difficult to follow, particularly to those unfamiliar with Buddhist thought, which may explain why Hancock never achieved the same degree of classic status as other early authors in the fantasy genre who explored spiritual themes.

Hancock freely intermingled talking animals and humanoids in his books (including humans, elves, masters of sorcery, etc.). In the first set of books, the animals are able to change into humans and pass as human. Later sets blur the distinction and have animals and humans together.

Hancock's universe has an ambiguous technological setting. Sometimes, the world he creates is like that of Tolkien, a primitive sword-and-sorcery world. At other times, it becomes modern with warfare resembling the state of technology in World War One (or, perhaps, the American Civil War). Hancock was a veteran of the Vietnam war and used his experiences in writing his fantasy books. His world, however, does not seem to have the automatic weapons and helicopters of that war.

== Bibliography ==
- The Circle of Light Series
1. Greyfax Grimwald January 1977 ISBN 0-445-08595-9
2. Faragon Fairingay January 1977 ISBN 0-445-08618-1
3. Calix Stay January 1977 ISBN 0-445-04047-5
4. Squaring the Circle January 1977 ISBN 0-445-04089-0
- Dragon Winter 1978 ISBN 0-445-04191-9
- The Wilderness of Four Series
1. Across the Far Mountain March 1982 ISBN 0-445-04705-4
2. The Plains of the Sea May 1982 ISBN 0-445-04712-7
3. On the Boundaries of Darkness August 1983 ISBN 0-446-31217-7
4. The Road to the Middle Islands August 1983 ISBN 0-446-31211-8
- The Windameir Circle Series
1. The Fires of Windameir February 1985 ISBN 0-446-32369-1
2. The Sea of Silence November 1987 ISBN 0-445-20565-2
3. A Wanderer's Return October 1988 ISBN 0-445-20822-8
4. The Bridge of Dawn December 1990 ISBN 0-445-20824-4

The first five books were published by Popular Library. They were reprinted in 1982 by Warner Books and several times throughout the 1980s, who also published the other books in the series at the same time as the Popular Library editions, which were identical. The print in many of these is unusually small even for pocket-sized paperbacks. The books featured cover art by Gervasio Gallardo.

The 2004 reprints were by Tor, and classified as young adult literature.

- The Circle of Light Series (2004 reprint)
1. Greyfax Grimwald Feb 2004 ISBN 0-7653-4613-3
2. Faragon Fairingay Apr 2004 ISBN 0-7653-4616-8
3. Calix Stay June 2004 ISBN 0-7653-4617-6
4. Squaring the Circle July 2004 ISBN 0-7653-4618-4

Note: These reprints are advertised as for ages ranging from 8 to 12. They contain advanced spiritual thematic matter. Further volumes of the other series were expected to be reprinted, but have never actually been issued.
