= Red Moon and Black Mountain =

1970 novel by Joy Chant

- First edition
- Author: Joy Chant
- Cover artist: Tony Raymond
- Language: English
- Series: Vandarei series
- Genre: Fantasy novel
- Publisher: George Allen & Unwin
- Publication date: 1970
- Publication place: United Kingdom
- Media type: Print (Hardcover)
- Pages: 276 pp.
- Followed by: The Grey Mane of Morning

Red Moon and Black Mountain: the End of the House of Kendreth is a fantasy novel by Joy Chant, the first of three set in her world of Vandarei. It was first published in the UK in hardback by George Allen & Unwin, London, in 1970. The first paperback edition was issued by Ballantine Books as the thirty-eighth volume of the Ballantine Adult Fantasy series in March, 1971. The Ballantine edition, which was also the first American edition, includes an introduction by Lin Carter and a cover illustrations by Bob Pepper. US hardback editions followed from the Science Fiction Book Club and Dutton (1976). The book was reprinted frequently by various publishers in both countries through 1983, but has since gone out of print. It has also been translated into German and Swedish.

== Plot summary ==
The story involves three children from Earth transported to the land of Vandarei in the world of Khendiol, and there separated; the older boy, Oliver, is adopted by horse-lords, and in a peculiar time-dilation effect grows to adulthood among them, forgetting his origins, while his younger siblings, taken in by the princess In'serinna, remain children and pursue their own quest. All their adventures are part of a larger effort to defeat Satan.

== Background ==
The novel is a high fantasy, and Carter's preface characterized it as showing influences from J. R. R. Tolkien's The Lord of the Rings and C. S. Lewis's Narnia series, which he presumed Chant had "read carefully" before beginning her tale. In an afterword to the third Vandarei book, When Voiha Wakes, Chant explained in detail the origins of Vandarei and the Kendreth stories, specifying that she had been reading folklore and mythology since childhood and that Vandarei was a "playworld":

"... it began as a playworld, the sort that a lot of children have, and I was of course the Queen, the character about whom I created the adventures. But I had the disposition of a pedant. I didn't really want to pretend: I wanted to know, to be sure, to get it right. So even in its childish form this playworld tended to become concise, factual. As I grew older, horses became a passion and the playworld developed into 'Equitania'—the horse motif strengthening. During this time the history of the country itself assumed an importance and I began to actually write. At fifteen, however, the last links with 'Equitania' wavered and the name 'Vandarei' appeared. The Queen was abandoned and ceased to be an avatar of myself, becoming a character whom I manipulated, but with whom I no longer especially identified."

== Recognition ==
The novel won the Mythopoeic Fantasy Award for 1972, and science fiction editor and critic David Pringle rated it as one of the hundred best fantasy novels in 1988.
