= Michael J. Sullivan (author) =

American novelist

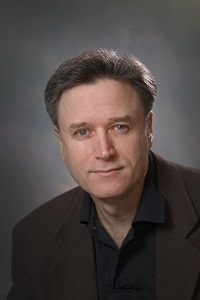
- Michael J. Sullivan in 2014
- Born: September 17, 1961 (age 64); Detroit, Michigan, U.S.
- Occupation: Writer
- Writing career
- Genres: High fantasy, science fiction
- Website: riyria.blogspot.com

Michael J. Sullivan (born September 17, 1961) is an American writer of epic fantasy and science fiction, best known for his debut series The Riyria Revelations, which has been translated into fourteen languages. In 2012 io9 named him one of the "Most Successful Self-Published Sci-Fi and Fantasy Authors". His books have been translated into French, German, Spanish, Czech, Dutch, Polish, Hungarian, Japanese, Georgian, Bulgarian, Russian, Portuguese, Italian and Turkish.

== Career ==
Sullivan started writing books at a young age in order to entertain himself. He started The Riyria Revelations to teach his daughter, who suffered from dyslexia, how to read.

Sullivan has written four series. The Riyria Revelations and The Riyria Chronicles were published by Orbit Books (fantasy imprint of Hachette Book Group) and The Legends of the First Empire released by Del Rey Books (owned by Random House). The Riyria Revelations is a six-book epic fantasy series while the Riyria Chronicles is an ongoing series that centers on the early adventures of the two main protagonists of the former series. The Legends of the First Empire is a six-book epic fantasy series set in the same world as the Riyria books, but in the distant past, making it a standalone series. His first science fiction novel, Hollow World, was released by Tachyon Publications in April 2014. His most recent project, The Rise and Fall, is a trilogy set in the world of Elan and falls chronologically between Legends of the First Empire and the Riyria Chronicles.

== Reception ==
Sullivan has three New York Times bestsellers (Age of War, Age of Legend and Nolyn), and three books on the USA Today bestseller list (Age of Swords, Age of War, Age of Legend). He has had nine works selected for the Goodreads Choice Award, six for Best Fantasy: The Emerald Storm in 2010, Percepliquis in 2012, and The Crown Tower in 2013, Age of Myth in 2016, Age of Swords in 2017, Age of War in 2018 and one for Best Science Fiction: Hollow World in 2014. Theft of Swords was selected as one of Barnes & Noble's 2011 Best Fantasy Books, shortlisted for the 2013 Audie Award for Fantasy, and also one of Library Journal's 2011 Best SF/Fantasy Books. Age of Myth was a 2016 Amazon's Best Books of the Year selection in the Science Fiction and Fantasy category.

== Bibliography ==
=== The Riyria Revelations ===
Royce Melborn, a skilled thief, and his mercenary partner, Hadrian Blackwater, are enterprising thieves who end up running for their lives when they're framed for the death of the king and get embroiled in larger political machinations.

1. The Crown Conspiracy, Self-published (2008)
2. Avempartha, Self-published (2009)
3. Nyphron Rising, Self-published (2009)
4. The Emerald Storm, Self-published (2010)
5. Wintertide, Self-published (2010)
6. Percepliquis, Self-published (2011)

- Theft of Swords collects The Crown Conspiracy and Avempartha, ISBN 978-0-316-18774-9 (2011)
- Rise of Empire collects Nyphron Rising and The Emerald Storm, ISBN 978-0-316-18770-1 (2011)
- Heir of Novron collects Wintertide and Percepliquis, ISBN 978-0-316-18771-8 (2012)

=== The Riyria Chronicles ===
A prequel series that explores the beginnings of Royce and Hadrian's partnership and first escapades.

1. The Crown Tower (2013)
2. The Rose and the Thorn (2013)
3. "The Jester" (2014)
4. "Professional Integrity" (2015)
5. The Death of Dulgath (2015)
6. The Disappearance of Winter's Daughter (2017)
7. Drumindor (2024)

=== The Legends of the First Empire ===
Taking place in the same world as the Riyria Revelations/Chronicles, this is a prequel series that takes place thousands of years before those series and reveals the truths about the First Empire that were hinted at in the Riyria novels.

1. Age of Myth (2016)
2. Age of Swords (2017)
3. Age of War (2018)
4. Age of Legend (2019)
5. Age of Death (2020)
6. Age of Empyre (2020)

There are also two short stories, related to the series:

1. "Little Wren and the Big Forest" (2016)
2. "Pile of Bones" (2019)

=== The Rise and Fall ===
This series will bridge the gap between The Legends of the First Empire and Riyria Chronicles.

1. Nolyn (2021)
2. Farilane (2022)
3. Esrahaddon (2023)

=== World of Elan chronological order ===
==== The Legends of the First Empire ====
1. Pile of Bones (2019)
2. Little Wren and the Big Forest (2016)
3. Age of Myth (2016)
4. Age of Swords (2017)
5. Age of War (2018)
6. Age of Legend (2019)
7. Age of Death (2020)
8. Age of Empyre (2020)

==== The Rise and Fall ====
1. Nolyn (2021)
2. Farilane (2022)
3. Esrahaddon (2023)

==== The Riyria Chronicles ====
1. The Crown Tower (2013)
2. The Rose and the Thorn (2013)
3. "The Jester" (2014)
4. "Professional Integrity" (2015)
5. The Death of Dulgath (2015)
6. The Disappearance of Winter's Daughter (2017)
7. Drumindor (2024)

==== The Riyria Revelations ====
1. "Traditions" (2013)
2. The Crown Conspiracy, Self-published (2008)
3. Avempartha, Self-published (2009)
4. Nyphron Rising, Self-published (2009)
5. The Emerald Storm, Self-published (2010)
6. Wintertide, Self-published (2010)
7. Percepliquis, Self-published (2011)
- Theft of Swords collects The Crown Conspiracy and Avempartha, ISBN 978-0-316-18774-9 (2011)
- Rise of Empire collects Nyphron Rising and The Emerald Storm, ISBN 978-0-316-18770-1 (2011)
- Heir of Novron collects Wintertide and Percepliquis, ISBN 978-0-316-18771-8 (2012)

=== Stand-alone novels ===
- Hollow World (2014, Tachyon Publications)

=== Short stories ===
==== Released individually ====
- The Viscount and the Witch, A Riyria short (Oct 2011)
- The Jester, A Riyria short (July 2014)
- Greener Grass, Time-travel Science Fiction (Oct 2012)

==== Released in Anthologies ====
- Traditions, included in Triumph Over Tragedy Anthology, (Jan 2013) from Terrene Press
- The Jester, included in Unfettered (June 2013) from Grim Oak Press
- Burning Alexandria, included in The End Anthology (Jan 2014) edited by N.E. White
- Be Careful What You Wish For, included in Help Fund My Robot Army (June 2014) edited by John Joseph Adams
- The Autumn Mists, included in Fantasy Faction Anthology (December 2014)
- Professional Integrity, included in Blackguards (April 26, 2015) from Ragnarok Publications
- The Storm, included in Unavowed (2025) from Grim Oak Press

=== Critical studies and reviews of Sullivan's work ===
Hollow world

- Heck, Peter (February 2015). "On Books". Asimov's Science Fiction. 39 (2): 107–111.
