= Eldon Thompson =

American novelist

Eldon Thompson (born May 6, 1974) is an American author and screenwriter known for his epic fantasy series The Legend of Asahiel, published by HarperCollins (Eos/HarperVoyager).

== Early life and education ==
Thompson was born in Dallas, Texas in 1974. The Valedictorian of his high school class, he earned a full scholarship to Western Oregon University, which he attended from 1992 to 1996. He studied English and the Health Sciences and participated in college football. He graduated with honors, named by the faculty as "Outstanding Student of the Year in English Literature". In 1998, he moved to Los Angeles to enroll in UCLA's Professional Program in Screenwriting, from which he graduated in 1999.

== Writing career ==
Thompson's debut novel, The Crimson Sword, was released in 2005, followed by The Obsidian Key in 2006 and The Divine Talisman in 2008. After a ten-year hiatus, a spinoff series featuring the character of Kylac Kronus was published in 2018 by Cyndyn. The so-called Warder trilogy comprised individual titles The Ukinhan Wilds (Book One), The Blackmoon Shards (Book Two), and The Sundered Isle (Book Three).

As a screenwriter, Thompson helped bring Terry Brooks's Shannara books to the attention of Warner Bros., which in 2007 optioned Thompson's feature adaptation of Brooks's second book in that series, The Elfstones of Shannara.

== Works ==
=== Novels ===
The Legend of Asahiel

- Book One:The Crimson Sword (2005)
- Book Two: The Obsidian Key (2006)
- Book Three: The Divine Talisman (2008)

Warder

- Book One:The Ukinhan Wilds (2018)
- Book Two: The Blackmoon Shards (2018)
- Book Three: The Sundered Isle (2018)

=== Screenplays ===
- The Elfstones of Shannara (based on the novel by Terry Brooks) - Warner Bros. (Option)

=== Short stories ===
- "Unbowed"; Unfettered; Grim Oak Press, June 2013.
- "The Last Consultation"; Ship's Log: Writings at Sea; Triple Tree Publishing, July 2004.
- "One Thorn Among Many"; Pronto! Writings from Rome; Writers House Books, August 2002.

=== Short films ===
- "Thorns"; 35 Terrace (2009)
