= Maria V. Snyder =

American novelist (born 1973)

- Born: April 15, 1973 (age 52); Philadelphia, Pennsylvania, U.S.
- Education: Pennsylvania State University (BS); Seton Hill University (MA)
- Occupation: Author
- Children: 2
- Website: www.mariavsnyder.com

Maria V. Snyder (born April 15, 1973) is an American fantasy and science fiction author best known for her Study Series.

== Career ==
Her first novel, Poison Study, was published in October 2005, won the 2006 Compton Crook Award, and earned a starred review from Publishers Weekly. The next two books in the series are Magic Study and Fire Study, which continued to follow the adventures of Yelena and Valek. Snyder then released another trilogy of books, the Glass Series. following the character Opal Cowan from the Study Series. The books in the series are Storm Glass, Sea Glass and Spy Glass respectively. Many of the characters from Study are also involved in the Glass books. For this series, Snyder enjoyed using her Meteorology degree to create magicians called Stormdancers who can harvest energy from storms.

Her environmental meteorology experience is most evident in her Insider Duology: Inside Out and Outside In. In this science fiction series, the people are living inside a giant metal cube and have lost track of what's outside their world. In order for the people to survive living inside a closed environment, Snyder used her knowledge of air scrubbers and waste-water treatment plants to create a world that is scientifically accurate.

As a mother of two children, Snyder hates when her kids are sick and wishes she could heal them with a touch. This desire led to her Healer Series, where Avry of Kazan can heal people by touching them, however the injury or sickness transfers to Avry, who heals at an accelerated rate. The Healer Series has three books, Touch of Power, Scent of Magic and Taste of Darkness.

In February 2015, Snyder returned to the main characters of the Study Series and released the first book of her next trilogy, the Soulfinder Series. The books in the series are Shadow Study, Night Study and Dawn Study. Her newest series is the Sentinels of the Galaxy Series. The first book, Navigating the Stars was published in December 2018. The second book, Chasing the Shadows was published in December 2019, and the third, Defending the Galaxy was released in December 2020.

Aside from writing, her interests include "traveling, photography, making jewelry, playing the cello, and volleyball."

== Bibliography ==
=== Chronicles of Ixia & Sitia ===
==== Study Series ====
- Poison Study (2005)
  - The Study of Poisons (2023) – retelling of Poison Study from Valek's point of view
- Magic Study (2006)
  - The Study of Magic (April 2024) - retelling of Magic Study from Valek's point of view
- Fire Study (2008)
  - The Study of Fire (November 2024) – retelling of Fire Study from Valek's point of view

==== Glass Series ====
- Storm Glass (2009)
- Sea Glass (September 2009)
- Spy Glass (September 2010)

==== Soulfinder Series ====
- Shadow Study (2015) – also considered as book 4 in the Study series
- Night Study (2016) – also considered as book 5 in the Study series
- Dawn Study (2017) also considered as book 6 in the Study series

==== Ixia & Sitia Short Fiction ====
The Study Chronicles: Tales of Ixia & Sitia (2023) - collection of short stories and novellas. Contains:

- Diamond Study
- Assassin Study (2009) - previously available on Snyder's website but removed in 2023
- Power Study (2008) – previously available on Snyder's website but removed in 2023
- Ice Study (2010) - previously available on Snyder's website but removed in 2023
- Shattered Glass (2016) – also available as a separate eNovella
- Diaper Study (2019) – previously available on Snyder's website but removed in 2023
- Wedding Study
- After Study

=== Inside Series ===
- Inside Out (2010)
- Outside In (2011)
- Inside (Collection of both novels in one book)

=== Healer Series ===
- Touch of Power (2011)
- Scent of Magic (2012)
- Taste of Darkness (2013)

=== Sentinels of the Galaxy ===
- Navigating the Stars (2018)
- Chasing the Shadows (November 18, 2019)
- Defending the Galaxy (November 23, 2020)

=== Archives of the Invisible Sword ===
- The Eyes of Tamburah (2019)
- The City of Zirdai (2021)
- The King of Koraha (2021)

=== Short stories ===
- Welcome, a near-future mystery story with elements of science fiction (Online)
- E-Time (Online)
- Protect the Children Eye Contact Seton Hill University's literary arts magazine (Online)
- Poseidon's Island, a short story in TV Gods - Summer Programming (2017)
- Paint by Numbers, a short story in Strange Magic (2016)
- Godzilla Warfare, a short story in The Best of Defending the Future 2011 and in No Man's Land 2011
- Halloween Men, a short story in Halloween: Magic, Mystery and the Macabre (2013)
- No Man's Land, a short story in Best Laid Plans (2013)
- Capturing Images, a short story in Bloody Fabulous (2012)
- Berserker Eyes, a short story in Brave New Love (2012)
- New Girl, a short story in Spirited (2011)
- Under Amber SKies, a short story in Corsets & Clockwork: 13 Steampunk Romances (2011)
- The Coldest Game, a short story in Bewere the Night (2011)
- Sake and Other Spirits, a short story in After Hours: Tales from the Ur-Bar (2011)
- Mongrel, a short story in Running with the Pack (2010)
- Dr. Time, a short story in The Stories in Between (2009)
- Sword Point, a short story in The Eternal Kiss (2009)
- Night Vision, a short story in The Mammoth Book of Paranormal Romance (2009)
- The Wizard's Daily Horoscope Black Gate Magazine Issue 11 (Summer 2007) (Online)

=== Other ===
- Storm Watcher
- Choices Can Be Made Again an essay in Divergent Thinking (2014)
- Dumping the Info Dump an essay in Many Genres One Craft (2011)
