= Elizabeth H. Boyer =

American fantasy author (born 1952)

Elizabeth Hall Boyer (born 1952) is an American fantasy author who produced books in the 1980s and early 1990s.

== Career ==
Boyer studied English literature and Scandinavian mythology at Brigham Young University. She lives on a farm near Atlanta and no longer writes.

== Influences ==
Her work is deeply influenced by Norse mythology, and set in a fantasy world with a similar climate and geography as the Scandinavia of Norse myths. While Norse myths influenced fantasy, including authors like Tolkien and Lewis, Boyer's works followed them more closely than other writers. Her stories are characterized by elements like light and dark elves, dwarves, trolls, sorcerers, ley lines, burial mounds, and wizards. She follows the Norse versions of these elements closely without much deviation. Her early books are dominated by the theme of the heroic quest.

== Criticism ==
Her works continue to be popular since their publication, although critics consider her later works inferior compared to her original Alfar series. The Skyla series was noted as "less ambitious" and darker yet slow-paced, patchy, and tentative.

== Bibliography ==
=== World of the Alfar ===
1. The Sword and the Satchel (1980)
2. The Elves and the Otterskin (1981)
3. The Thrall and the Dragon's Heart (1982)
4. The Wizard and the Warlord (1983)
- "The Stillborn Heritage" (Four from the Witch World, 1989)

=== Wizard's War ===
1. The Troll's Grindstone (1986)
2. The Curse of Slagfid (1989)
3. The Dragon's Carbuncle (1990)
4. The Lord of Chaos (1991)
- "The Stillborn Heritage" (Four from the Witch World, 1989)

=== Skyla ===
1. The Clan of the Warlord (1992)
2. The Black Lynx (1993)
3. Keeper of Cats (1995)

=== Short stories ===
- "Borrowing Trouble" (Catfantastic, 1989)
- "The Last Gift" (Catfantastic II, 1990)
- "A Foreigner Comes to Reddyville" (Washed by a Wave of Wind: Science Fiction from the Corridor, 1994)
