= The Redemption of Althalus =

Fantasy novel by David Eddings and Leigh Eddings

- First edition cover
- Author: David Eddings & Leigh Eddings
- Language: English
- Genre: Fantasy
- Publisher: Voyager (UK) & Del Rey Books (USA)
- Publication date: 3 July 2000
- Publication place: United States
- Media type: Print (Hardback & Paperback)
- Pages: 704 pp (first edition, hardback)
- ISBN: 0-00-710352-2 (first edition, hardback)
- OCLC: 43785728
- Preceded by: none
- Followed by: none

The Redemption of Althalus is a stand-alone fantasy novel by David and Leigh Eddings. Its main character is Althalus, a professional thief enlisted by the Goddess Dweia to save the world from the desolations of her evil brother Daeva and his henchman Ghend.

== Plot summary ==
=== Life as thief ===
The story revolves around Althalus, a professional thief with a gift for storytelling and a reputation for uncanny luck. After numerous disasters (Althalus believes that luck has left him for good), the thief decides to return to the lands of the north, where he grew up, and decides to rob a fort. After arriving there, and amusing everyone with his stories, Althalus breaks into the storeroom during the night only to find out that all the talk about gold in the fort were lies, and that there are only bags of worthless copper coins and a handful of brass coins. Furious, Althalus steals all the brass coins and leaves – only to become chased by every man in the fort, its owner taking advantage of the situation to claim the theft of a non-existent fortune. He escapes to Hule, where he finds refuge in a camp. A man named Ghend arrives there a short time later and presents Althalus with a proposition.

=== The House at the End of the World ===
Ghend hires Althalus to travel to the "House at the End of the World" to steal a book. Although he suspects something is amiss, Althalus accepts the job and heads there. After several days of travel he finds the house and manages to stumble upon the book, only to realize that the House is occupied by a talking cat who has trapped him. After several days of being trapped he finally decides to listen to the cat and thus finds out several astonishing things. The book is called the Book of Deiwos, Deiwos being the God who created the world, and the cat (named Emerald or Emmy by Althalus) teaches him to read it. After two and a half thousand years, Emerald reveals to Althalus that the book can be used to accomplish feats of magic .

=== Rescuing the world ===
Emerald tells Althalus that he has actually been in the house for many, many years. The intervening two millennia have seen many changes in the world, including the initial stages of an ice age triggered by the evil God Daeva. She also tells Althalus that Ghend is Daeva's agent, and is working to establish Daeva as the ruler of the world. The cat and Althalus set out to gather a party of people who are destined to save the world from Daeva's dominion. They try to find the knife which will guide them to each person. Having arrived at the knife's depository, they are told that the knife has been taken by Eliar, a member of the army. With this new information they travel to Osthos, where Eliar seems to have become a slave. Deciding that they will have to buy off all the slaves, the two travel to Emerald's private gold mine and collect twenty blocks of gold, which Althalus converts into coins. With their purses full, they return and meet Andine, the queen (or "Arya") of Osthos, in her palace, posing as slavers. However, Andine won't sell Eliar to them. Emerald worms her way into Andine's affection in an attempt to persuade her to give up Eliar. Finally, the queen agrees to sell the other slaves along with Eliar. With the deal struck, Althalus leads his troupe out, but overhears Eliar planning on attacking him with the other soldier slaves. To break the soldier's loyalty, he randomly picks a soldier and sends him several thousand feet into the air before bringing him back down and releasing the slaves, except Eliar, whom he keeps chained up. In the morning, Eliar decides that he will follow Althalus.

=== Recruiting the party ===
After buying some horses they head to Awes, where Emerald tells Eliar that he must show the writing on the knife to every priest in Awes and ask if they can read it. While doing this they discover an agent of Daeva, who screams in anguish after seeing the knife. Eliar quickly slays him and they hide the body under a pile of rocks. A young priest finds them, but it turns out that the priest is none other than the fourth member of their party, Bheid. With their new member ready, Emerald "reads" the knife, which leads them back to Osthos, where their fifth member is destined to be none other that the queen of Osthos: Andine.

Returning to Osthos, they camp out behind the walls of the city for the night. Formulating a plan, Althalus and Emerald sneak into Andine's palace unnoticed. In her chambers, Emerald captures Andine in a spell, causing her to be little more than a puppet. Leading their newest member out of the city, they rejoin their group and decide to hastily leave before morning comes and Andine is discovered missing. Andine wants no part in this and focuses on killing Eliar, but the enchantment on the knife forces her to listen to Althalus, and so, with their newest member in tow, the party travels to Hule, to find their sixth member.

While traveling towards Hule, Bheid tries to quell Andine's hatred towards Eliar – with limited success, but it appears to be taking effect when Andine refrains from making any scathing remarks towards Eliar. During the night, Althalus and Eliar hear someone sneaking towards their camp and capture the boy named Gher, who, it turns out, is their sixth member. Emerald finally sorts out the problems with Andine by using Gher as a voice, Andine (having a change of heart) helps clean up the beaten up Gher and they head to Kweron to find their final member; a "witch".

In Kweron, Althalus and Emerald hatch up a scheme that involves Bheid; Bheid will pretend that he has come to collect the "witch" for interrogation, as well as predicting avalanches and lightning strikes (which Althalus will provide). Bheid is, at first, reluctant to lie that blatantly about something, but in the end, he agrees. After a conversation with the priests of the village, he finds out that the "witch" is about to be burned alive. Through the respect he has gathered by his "forecasts", he can convince the priests to give the enigmatic Leitha into his care. Before leaving, Leitha reveals that she can "hear" the thoughts of other people.

=== The final battle ===
The group decides to travel back to the House at the end of the world. Emerald explains the origins of why they must do what they do:

Deiwos, the Sky God – and Goddess Dweia's brother – created the world, and filled the planet with living things, whom Dweia cares for. However, Daeva's only role is to destroy parts of the universe, but only those which Deiwos and Dweia allow him to. Daeva tries to change this, and has Ghend find each member of his "chosen ones" to prepare to take over the world, and to do this he needs Deiwos's book, to copy it and make a book of his own for this purpose.

After learning this, Althalus introduces Dweia to the group, being none other than Emerald, to the "family" and quickly explains the situation to them as well as telling them about Eliar's ability to use the doors of the House to travel through Spacetime.

After getting acquainted with living in the house, they use the doors to return to Arum where they try to win Albron's (the knife keeper's) clan as allies, and show him the House as an act of trust. They know that they will need an army to combat Gelta's archaic forces from the past. Calling a clan meeting they hire all the Arum clans and prepare themselves to fight against Gelta's army. Thanks to the more modern warfare of their time, Gelta's forces are easily crushed and, although Eliar is injured, with the help of Althalus's powers, the remaining part of the enemy forces is defeated.

Ultimately, Ghend and Althalus face off in the House at the end of the world, ending with the destruction of the Book of Daeva, the defeat of Daeva, and the saving of the universe.
