= The Riyria Chronicles =

Series of high fantasy novels by Michael J. Sullivan

Riyria Chronicles
- The Crown Tower; The Rose and the Thorn; The Death of Dulgath; The Disappearance of Winter's Daughter; Drumindor
- Author: Michael J. Sullivan
- Language: English
- Genre: Epic fantasy
- Publisher: Orbit Books
- Published: 2013 – present
- Media type: Print (paperback hardcover); Audiobook ebook
- Followed by: Riyria Revelations

The Riyria Chronicles is a series of high fantasy novels by Michael J. Sullivan, published since 2013 by Orbit Books. The series consists of five books, in order of publication: The Crown Tower, The Rose and the Thorn, The Death of Dulgath, The Disappearance of Winter's Daughter and Drumindor. They are prequels to Sullivan's Riyria Revelations series.

== Books ==
The series The Riyria Revelations and its prequels, The Riyria Chronicles, can be read in chronological order or order of publication. The author has recommended reading in publication order as listed below.

1. The Crown Tower (August 2013), core novel #1
2. The Viscount and the Witch (October 2011), short story
3. The Rose and the Thorn (September 2013), core novel #2
4. The Jester (January 2014), short story
5. Professional Integrity (June 2015), short story
6. The Death of Dulgath (October 2015), core novel #3
7. The Disappearance of Winter's Daughter (September 2017), core novel #4
8. Drumindor (October 2024), core novel #5
