= The Elenium =

Series of fantasy novels

The Elenium is a series of fantasy novels by American writer David Eddings. The series consists of three volumes: The Diamond Throne, The Ruby Knight, and The Sapphire Rose. The series is followed by The Tamuli. The Elenium is Eddings' third fantasy series.

== The Diamond Throne ==
The Diamond Throne
- Cover of The Diamond Throne
- Author: David Eddings
- Language: English
- Series: The Elenium
- Genre: Fantasy
- Publisher: Del Rey Books
- Publication date: 1989
- Publication place: USA
- Media type: Print ( )
- Pages: 448 (paperback)
- ISBN: 0-345-36769-3
- OCLC: 22165781
- Preceded by: none
- Followed by: The Ruby Knight

Sparhawk, a Pandion Knight, has returned to his hometown Cimmura after ten years of exile in Rendor.

He finds his Queen and former pupil, Ehlana, has fallen ill, having been poisoned. Queen Ehlana has been encased in diamond by magic performed by Sephrenia, the Styric tutor of magic to the Pandion Knights. The diamond will keep Queen Ehlana alive for up to 12 months while a cure is found.

To aid him on his quest, Sparhawk takes his childhood friend and fellow Pandion Knight Kalten, his squire Kurik, and Sephrenia. In a show of unity, the other three Church Knight Orders also send their champions to be his companions: Genidian Knight Ulath of Thalesia, Alcione Knight Tynian of Deira, and Cyrinic Knight Bevier of Arcium.

The company is also joined by Talen, a wayward, young and gifted thief, and by a mysterious little girl, named Flute, who is quite a bit more than she seems. The novel ends after Sparhawk, Kurik, Sephrenia, and Flute return to Rendor and discover the only way to cure Ehlana is with magic. It is in this book that Sparhawk first hears the word Bhelliom.

== The Ruby Knight ==
The Ruby Knight
- Cover of The Ruby Knight
- Author: David Eddings
- Language: English
- Series: The Elenium
- Genre: Fantasy
- Publisher: Del Rey Books
- Publication date: 1991
- Publication place: USA
- Media type: Print ( )
- Pages: 384 (paperback)
- ISBN: 0-345-37352-9
- Preceded by: The Diamond Throne
- Followed by: The Sapphire Rose

Sir Sparhawk and his companions seek the Bhelliom, a powerful magical artifact in the form of a sapphire carved in the shape of a rose, the only object with enough power to cure the rare poison administered to Queen Ehlana. The Bhelliom was last known to have been mounted on the crown of the Thalesian King Sarak.

The characters travel to the house of Count Ghasek whose sister is ill, as her soul was stolen by Azash, an Elder God of Styricum, whose spirit was confined in a clay idol. Sephrenia and the others manage to cure Lady Belina, though she has been rendered hopelessly mad by destroying the idol which was controlling her power. The Count then tells them about the giant's mound where King Sarak was buried.

After finding King Sarak's grave they learn that the crown had not been buried with him. They encounter a serf who tells them about the great battle which killed the King and how the Earl of Heid retrieved the fallen King's crown and cast it into the dark murky waters of Lake Randera.

The search for Bhelliom suffers a setback when Ghwerig, the deformed dwarf troll who originally carved the gem into the shape of a rose, retrieves the Bhelliom first after his own centuries-long search to reclaim his beloved gem.

Sparhawk and his companions follow Ghwerig to his secret cave hidden in the mountains of Thalesia. The book ends with Sparhawk and his squire Kurik giving Ghwerig fatal injuries. Ghwerig then intentionally rolls off a cliff into a chasm, Bhelliom still clutched in his hand. The girl Flute dives into the chasm only to rise out again with the Bhelliom and depositing it into Sparhawk's hands, thereby revealing her true identity as Aphrael, Child-Goddess of Styricum.

== The Sapphire Rose ==
The Sapphire Rose
- Cover of The Sapphire Rose
- Author: David Eddings
- Language: English
- Series: The Elenium
- Genre: Fantasy
- Publisher: Del Rey Books
- Publication date: 1992
- Publication place: USA
- Media type: Print ( )
- Pages: 512 (paperback)
- ISBN: 0-345-37472-X
- Preceded by: The Ruby Knight
- Followed by: none

Sparhawk now has possession of the Bhelliom, so he returns to Cimmura and uses it to cure Queen Ehlana. Unfortunately, when returning the symbolic ring of the monarchy to her, she, perhaps deliberately, mistakes his action for a marriage proposal. The engagement has been publicly announced before he has had time to clarify this - although it seems unlikely that Ehlana would have been willing to break the engagement anyway. After curing the Queen of her illness, the knights ride for Chyrellos to prevent the Primate of Cimmura from ascending the throne of Archprelate. An enormous army lays siege to the Holy City.

Meanwhile, the evil God Azash and his servant, Otha, have been massing their forces along the eastern border of Eosia in preparation for an invasion of the west. Sparhawk decides, after consultation with his superiors in the Church, to take Bhelliom and travel to Zemoch with several others, with the intention of destroying Azash.

They reach the city of Zemoch, and find the temple which contains the mud idol to which Azash is confined. By a slightly odd mixture of subtlety and brute force, they gain access to the inner room - but not without the loss of Kurik, Sparhawk's squire and friend. Sparhawk duels with Martel, another of Azash's accomplices, and kills him; he then goes on to destroy Azash himself, who takes Otha and Annias with him.

The end of the series comes to a close with the birth of Sparhawk's daughter Danae, who reveals herself to be Aphrael.

== Special release ==
In September 2008, Del Ray books released all three novels of the Elenium series in a single, trade paperback volume. A similar treatment occurred to the Tamuli series in 2008. The new single volume features all of the same material found in the three separate novels including maps. It weighs in at 912 pages; the cover is orange in colour and features an image of Sparhawk kneeling down before Queen Ehlana who is sitting on her throne. Black Kat Design designed the cover with the illustration done by Keith Parkinson.

== Reviews ==
- Envoyer (German) (Issue 1 - Nov 1996)

== See also ==
- The Tamuli
