= Vladislav Rusanov (writer) =

Ukrainian writer (born 1966)

Vladislav Adolfovitch Rusanov
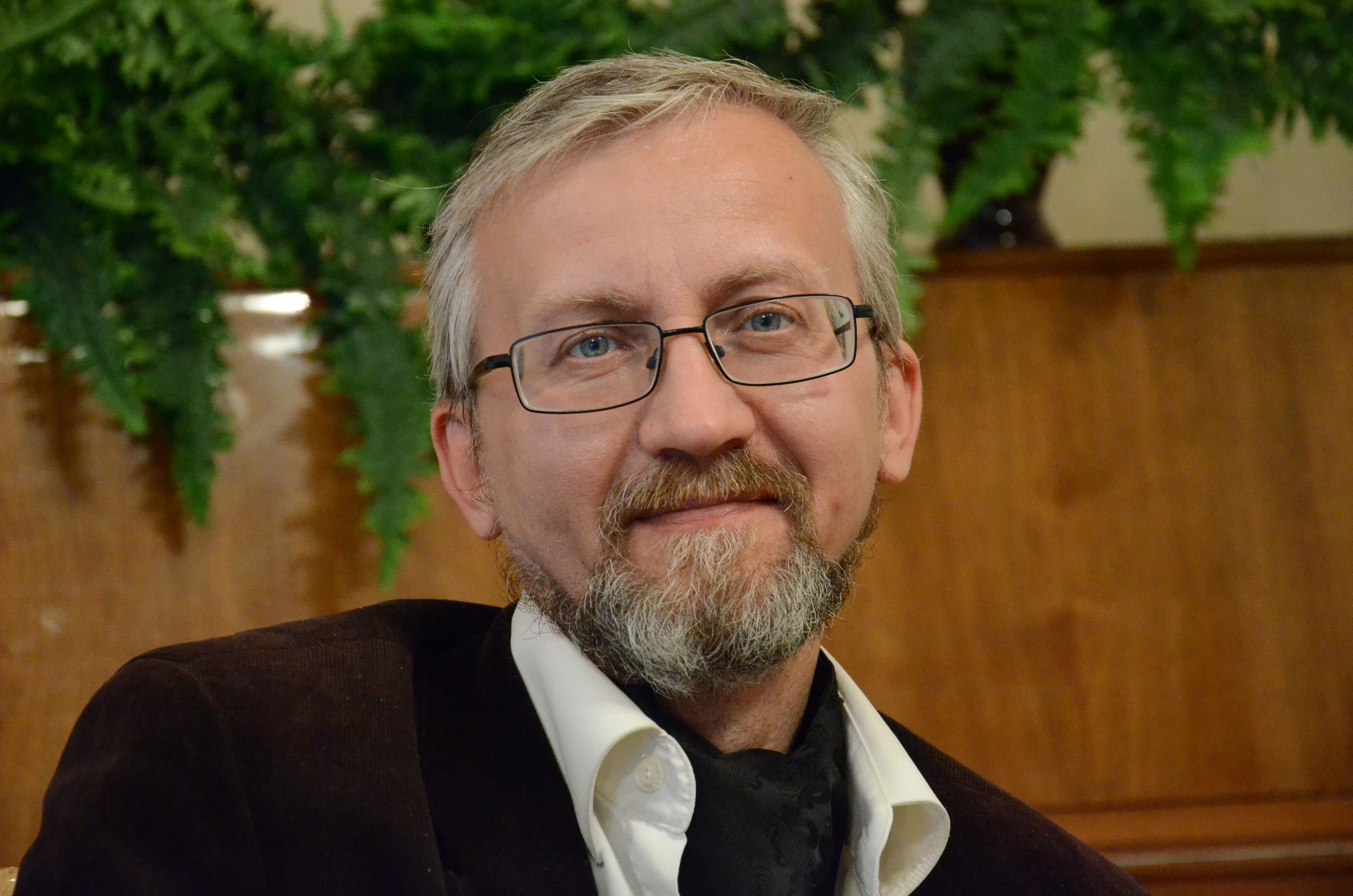
- Vladislav Rusanov
- Born: June 12, 1966 (age 60); Donetsk, Soviet Union
- Occupation: Writer
- Writing career
- Genre: Fantasy
- Notable work: Hot Winds Of North

Vladislav Adolfovitch Rusanov (Russian: Владислав Адольфович Русанов; born June 12, 1966) is a fantasy writer, candidate of technical sciences (1999). Writes in Russian language. Is also known for translations of fantasy and romantic poetry into Russian. Formerly a Ukrainian citizen, he now identifies with the Donetsk People's Republic.

When the Donetsk People's Republic proclaimed itself as an independent state from Ukraine, he expressed support of the breakaway republic, and became one of the founders of the Donetsk People's Republic Writers' Union.

He was sanctioned by the United Kingdom from 13 April 2022 in relation to Russia's actions in Ukraine.

== Bibliography ==
Hot Winds Of North

- Dawn's Gust (Russian: Рассветный шквал) (2004)
- Midday Storm (Russian: Полуденная буря) (2005)
- Sunset's Hurricane (Russian: Закатный ураган) (2005)

Blades Of Boundaries

- The Damned Cargo (Russian: Окаянный груз) (2006)
- The Revenge Will Not Be (Russian: Мести не будет) (2006)

Dragons Slayer

- The Stepchild of Destiny (Russian: Пасынок судьбы) (2006)
- The Hostage of Fortune (Russian: Заложник удачи) (2007)

Bronze griffin

- Bronze Griffin (Russian: Бронзовый грифон) (2007)
- Silver Bear (Russian: Серебряный медведь) (2007)
- Golden Boar (Russian: Золотой вепрь) (2008)
- Steel Thrush (Russian: Стальной дрозд) (2008)

Warlock

- Warlock of Gardarika (Russian: Ворлок из Гардарики) (2008)
- Rites of Warlock (Russian: Обряд ворлока) (2009)
- Messenger from Moscow (Russian: Гонец московский) (2010)
- Roads and destinies (Russian: Дороги и судьбы) (2011)
