= Outline of fantasy =

Overview of and topical guide to fantasy

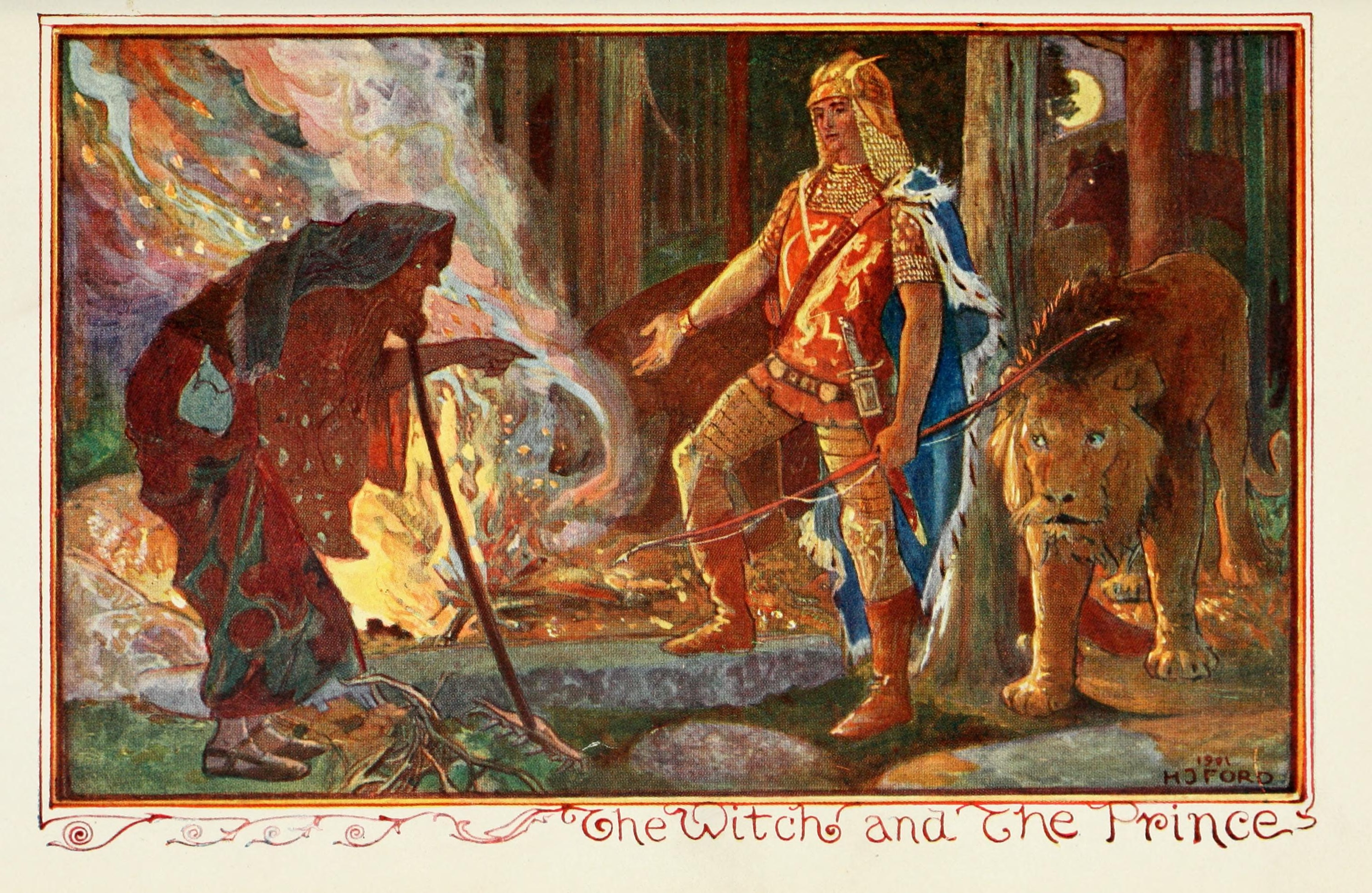
The Violet Fairy book (1906)

The following outline is provided as an overview of and topical guide to fantasy:

Fantasy – genre of fiction that commonly uses magic and other supernatural phenomena as a primary plot element, theme, or setting. Many works within the genre take place in imaginary worlds where magic is common. Fantasy is generally distinguished from the genre of science fiction by the expectation that it steers clear of scientific themes and efforts to make depictions scientifically plausible, though there is a great deal of overlap between the two genres.

== What type of thing is fantasy? ==
Fantasy can be described as all of the following:

- Genre – any category of literature or other forms of art or entertainment, e.g. music, whether written or spoken, audial or visual, based on some set of stylistic criteria. For example, jazz is a genre of music. Fantasy is a genre of fiction, and more specifically, a genre of speculative fiction.
  - Genre of fiction – fiction is a form of narrative which deals, in part or in whole, with events that are not factual, but rather, imaginary and invented by its author(s). Although fiction often describes a major branch of literary work, it is also applied to theatrical, cinematic, and musical work.
    - Genre of speculative fiction – one of the more fantastical fiction genres. Others include science fiction, fantasy, horror, weird fiction, supernatural fiction, superhero fiction, utopian and dystopian fiction, apocalyptic and post-apocalyptic fiction, and alternate history.
- Genre fiction – fictional works (novels, short stories, etc.) written with the intent of fitting into a specific literary genre in order to appeal to readers and fans already familiar with that genre. Also known as popular fiction.

== Genres of fantasy ==
- Bangsian – concerns the use of famous literary or historical individuals and their interactions in the afterlife. It is named for John Kendrick Bangs, who often wrote in this genre.
- Contemporary fantasy – set in the present day. These terms are used to describe stories set in the putative real world (often referred to as consensus reality) in contemporary times, in which magic and magical creatures exist, either living in the interstices of our world or leaking over from alternate worlds. Also known as modern fantasy or indigenous fantasy.
  - Urban fantasy – defined by place; the fantastic narrative has an urban setting. Many urban fantasies are set in contemporary times and contain supernatural elements. However, the stories can take place in historical, modern, or futuristic periods, as well as fictional settings. The prerequisite is that they must be primarily set in a city.
- Dark fantasy – a subgenre of fantasy which can refer to literary, artistic, and filmic works that combine fantasy with elements of horror. The term can be used broadly to refer to fantastical works that have a dark, gloomy atmosphere or a sense of horror and dread and a dark, often brooding, tone.
- Fables – type of narration demonstrating a useful truth. Animals speak as humans, legendary, supernatural tale.
- Fairytale fantasy – distinguished from other genres of fantasy by the works' heavy use of motifs, and often plots, from folklore.
- Hard fantasy – strives to present stories set in (and often centered on) a rational and knowable world. Hard fantasy is similar to hard science fiction, from which it draws its name, in that both aim to build their respective worlds in a rigorous and logical manner.
- Heroic fantasy – chronicles the tales of heroes in imaginary lands. Frequently, the protagonist is reluctant to be a champion, is of low or humble origin, and has royal ancestors or parents but does not know it. Though events are usually beyond their control, they are thrust into positions of great responsibility where their mettle is tested in a number of spiritual and physical challenges.
- High fantasy – defined either by its taking place in an imaginary world distinct from our own or by the epic stature of its characters, themes and plot. Also called epic fantasy.
- Historical fantasy – makes use of specific elements of real world history.
  - Medieval fantasy – encompasses medieval era high fantasy and sometimes simply represents fictitious versions of historic events. This subgenre is common among role-playing games, text-based roleplaying, and high-fantasy literature.
  - Wuxia – distinct quasi-fantasy subgenre of the martial arts genre.
- Juvenile fantasy – children's literature with fantasy elements: fantasy intended for readers not yet adult. The protagonists are usually children or teens who have unique abilities, gifts, possessions or even allies that allow them to face powerful adversaries.
- Legends – stories, oftentimes of a national hero or other folk figure, which have a basis in fact, but also contain imaginative material.
- Low fantasy – involves "nonrational happenings that are without causality or rationality because they occur in the rational world where such things are not supposed to occur."
  - Comic fantasy – primarily humorous in intent and tone. Usually set in imaginary worlds, comic fantasy often includes puns on and parodies of other works of fantasy. It is sometimes known as low fantasy in contrast to high fantasy, which is primarily serious in intent and tone. The term "low fantasy" is used to represent other types of fantasy, however, so while comic fantasies may also correctly be classified as low fantasy, many examples of low fantasy are not comic in nature.
- Magical girl – genre about girls who uses magic in either their training, idol stardom or even to fight evil. This genre is very popular in Japan.
- Mythic fiction – rooted in, inspired by, or that in some way draws from the tropes, themes and symbolism of myth, folklore, and fairy tales. Mythic fiction overlaps with urban fantasy and the terms are sometimes used interchangeably, but mythic fiction also includes contemporary works in non-urban settings.
- Romantic fantasy – describes a fantasy story using many of the elements and conventions of the romance genre.
- Science fantasy – has mystical elements that are scientifically explainable, or which combines science fiction elements with fantasy elements. Science fiction was once referred to under this name.
  - Sword and planet – fantasy genre that features rousing adventure stories set on other planets, and usually featuring Earthmen as protagonists. There is a fair amount of overlap between "Sword & Planet" and "planetary romance" although some works are considered to belong to one and not the other. In general, Planetary Romance is considered to be more of a Space Opera subgenre, influenced by the likes of A Princess of Mars yet more modern and technologically savvy, while Sword & Planet more directly imitates the conventions established by Burroughs in the Mars series.
  - Dying Earth – takes place either at the end of life on Earth or the End of Time, when the laws of the universe themselves fail. More generally, the Dying Earth subgenre encompasses science fiction works set in the far distant future in a milieu of stasis or decline. Themes of world-weariness, innocence (wounded or otherwise), idealism, entropy, (permanent) exhaustion/depletion of many or all resources (such as soil nutrients), and the hope of renewal tend to pre-dominate.
- Shenmo fantasy – fantasy genre involving the mythology of China and East Asia
- Sword and sorcery – blend of heroic fantasy, adventure, and frequent elements of the horrific in which a mighty barbaric warrior hero is pitted against both human and supernatural adversaries. Robert E. Howard, creator of Conan the Barbarian, Kull of Atlantis, the Pictish king Bran Mak Morn, etc. is generally acknowledged as the founder of the genre, chiefly through his writings for Weird Tales and other 1920s and 1930s pulp fiction magazines.

== Fantasy media ==
- Fantastic art
- Fantasy comics
- Fantasy film
  - Fantasy anime
  - Fantasy television
- Fantasy games
  - Fantasy wargame – wargame that involves a fantastical setting, and employs rules for elements such as magic and non-human intelligent creatures.
  - Fantasy role-playing game
- Fantasy literature
  - Fantasy fiction magazine

== History of fantasy ==
History of fantasy

- Sources of fantasy

== Elements of fantasy ==
- Fantasy tropes and conventions

=== Fantastic creatures ===
- Legendary creature
- Angel
- Demon
- Dragon
- Elemental
- Familiar
- Fairy
- Spirit
- Undead

=== Types of characters in fantasy ===
Stock characters:

- Black knight
- Caveman
- Hero
- Knight-errant
- Magician
- Occult detective
  - List of fictional science fiction and fantasy detectives
- Witch

=== Magic ===
Magic in fiction

- Animism
- Evocation
- Incantation
- Necromancy
- Shapeshifting
- Witchcraft

=== Fantasy races ===
Fantastic race

- Dwarves
- Elves
- Giants
- Gnomes
- Goblins
- Hobbits
  - Halflings
- Munchkins
- Orcs
- Trolls

=== Places and events ===
- Astral plane
- Enchanted forest
- Fantasy world
  - List of fantasy worlds
- List of mythological places
- Floating cities and islands in fiction
- Lost city
- Quests
- Subterranean fiction

=== Items ===
- List of fictional swords
  - Magic sword
- List of fictional elements, materials, isotopes and subatomic particles
- Magic rings
- Magic potions

== Works of fantasy ==
=== Fantastic art ===
- List of science fiction and fantasy artists

=== Fantasy games ===
==== Fantasy role-playing games ====
- Dungeons & Dragons
- Warhammer Fantasy Roleplay –

==== Fantasy wargames ====
- Warhammer Fantasy Battle – table-top fantasy miniature wargame.

=== Fantasy literature ===
- Fantasy comics
- Speculative poetry
- List of high fantasy fiction

==== Fantasy novels ====
- List of fantasy novels

==== Fantasy short stories ====
- List of fantasy story collections

===== Venues for science fiction short stories =====
- Fantasy fiction magazine
- Fantasy fiction fanzine

=== Fantasy video ===
- Fantasy film
  - List of fantasy films
  - List of fantasy anime
- Fantasy on television
  - List of fantasy television programs

=== Fantasy worlds ===
See the List of fantasy worlds. Some examples of fantasy worlds include:

- Wizarding World
- Azeroth
- Eberron
- Landover
- Middle-earth
- Narnia
- Neverland
- Nirn
- Oerth
- Land of Oz
- Pern
- Thieves' World
- Wonderland
- Xanth

== Fantasy pop culture ==
- Harry Potter fandom
- Tolkien fandom

== Fantasy organizations ==
- British Fantasy Society

== Fantasy awards ==
- Aurealis Award –
- Aurealis Award for best fantasy short story –
- Darrell Awards –
- Dwarf Stars Award –
- Gandalf Award –
- Gaylactic Spectrum Awards –
- Premio Ignotus –
- International Fantasy Award –
- James Tiptree, Jr. Award –
- Japan Fantasy Novel Award –
- John W. Campbell Award for Best New Writer –
- Lewis Carroll Shelf Award –
- Méliès d'Or –
- Mythopoeic Awards –
- Andre Norton Award –
- Persian Speculative Art and Literature Award –
- Phantastik-Preis der Stadt Wetzlar –
- Pilgrim Award –
- Prix Nocturne –
- Rhysling Award –
- Saturn Award –
- Science Fiction & Fantasy Translation Awards –
- Sense of Gender Awards –
- Tähtifantasia Award –
- The George Pal Memorial Award –
- The Life Career Award –
- The President's Memorial Award –
- World Fantasy Award –
- WSFA Small Press Award –

== Persons influential in fantasy ==
- List of James Tiptree, Jr. Award winners
- List of Lambda Literary Awards winners and nominees for science fiction, fantasy and horror

=== Fantasy artists ===
- List of science fiction and fantasy artists

=== Authors of fantasy ===
See the List of fantasy authors. Some influential fantasy writers include:

- C.S. Lewis – wrote the Chronicles of Narnia series of novels.
- David Eddings – American fantasy writer, who, with his wife Leigh, he authored several best-selling epic fantasy novel series, including The Belgariad (1982–84), The Malloreon (1987–91), The Elenium (1989–91), The Tamuli (1992–94) and The Dreamers (2003–06).
- George R. R. Martin – American screenwriter and author of fantasy, horror, and science fiction. He is best known for A Song of Ice and Fire, his international bestselling series of epic fantasy novels that HBO adapted for their dramatic series Game of Thrones.
- J. K. Rowling – author of the Harry Potter series
- J.R.R. Tolkien – famous for The Hobbit and The Lord of the Rings trilogy.
- Michael Moorcock
- Ursula K. Le Guin
- Katherine Kurtz –
- Lewis Carroll – English writer, mathematician, logician, Anglican deacon and photographer. His most famous writings are Alice's Adventures in Wonderland and its sequel Through the Looking-Glass, as well as the poems "The Hunting of the Snark" and "Jabberwocky", all examples of the genre of literary nonsense.
- L. Frank Baum – American author of children's books, best known for writing The Wonderful Wizard of Oz.
- Stephenie Meyer – American young adult author and producer, best known for her vampire romance series Twilight.
- R.A. Salvatore –

=== Fantasy filmmakers ===
- David Yates – various Harry Potter films
- Chris Columbus - Harry Potter 1 and 2
- Alfonso Cuarón
- Peter Jackson – the Lord of the Rings film trilogy and The Hobbit trilogy.
- Tim Burton – Edward Scissorhands and other films

== See also ==
- List of genres
- List of literary genres
- List of Canadian science fiction and fantasy authors
- List of fictional science fiction and fantasy detectives
- Supernatural fiction
- Fantastic
- Fantastique
- Lovecraftian horror
- Picts in fantasy
- Russian science fiction and fantasy
- Worldbuilding
