= List of Night Wizard episodes =

The cover of the first DVD released by Geneon Entertainment.

The episodes of Night Wizard: The Animation, the 2007 Japanese animated television series, are directed by Yusuke Yamamoto and produced by Hal Film Maker and Omnibus Promotion, which produced the animation and sound respectively. They are based on the Night Wizard! role-playing game released by Enterbrain in 2002, and adapt the source material over thirteen episodes. The plot of the episodes follows Renji Hiiragi, a magic user known as a "Night Wizard" that protects the world against demonic beings called Emulators, as he protects newly ordained Night Wizard Elis Shihō on their quest to find the Jewels of Virtue.

The episodes aired from October 2, 2007, to December 25, 2007, on Chiba TV, Tokyo MX TV, and TV Aichi. TV Osaka and TV Saitama broadcast the episodes later in October, and Kids Station started airing the episodes in November.

Two pieces of theme music are used for the episodes; one opening theme and one closing theme. The opening theme is "Kurenai" by Ui Miyazaki, and the closing theme is Erinyes (エリニュエス) by BETTA FLASH. A single for "Kurenai" was released on November 21, 2007, and a single for "Erinyes" was released on the same date.

Seven DVD compilations have been planned for release by Geneon Entertainment in Japan. The first DVD, containing the first episode of the anime, was released on December 21, 2007, and the second compilation, containing the next two episodes, is slated for release on January 25, 2008.

== Episode list ==
No.	Title	Directed by	Written by	Original release date
1	"Lunar Casket ~Red Moon, Blue Eyes~"; Transliteration: "Gekkō ~Akaki Tsuki, Aoki Hitomi~" (Japanese: 「月匣｣ 〜紅き月, 碧き瞳〜)	Yūji Kumazawa	Ayuna Fujisaki	October 2, 2007
Renji Hiiragi is dispatched by Anzelotte, his employer, to destroy a group of Emulators with the aid of fellow Night Wizard Akari Himuro. The two easily destroy the Emulators, although Renji complains that he cannot attend school due to his job. Elsewhere, Elis Shihō transfers into Kimei Private Academy, Renji's school, and joins the Astronomy Club headed by Kureha Akabane. Renji tries to return to school, but is shepherded away by Anzelotte for another mission. As he walks home in the evening, Anzelotte picks up him via helicopter for a third mission. A red moon then appears in the sky, and Elis walks entranced towards an old sakura tree at the school, and Kureha follows her. The Demon Lord Bell Zephyr sends an Emulator to kill the two, and Kureha reveals that she is a Night Wizard as well. Renji arrives as well, but the two are unable to stop the Emulator from attacking Elis, whose bracelet absorbs a jewel from the sakura tree and manifests as a group of shields. Renji dispatches the Emulator, and Renji and Kureha take Elis to Anzelotte.
2	"Fallen Man ~The Targeted World~"; Transliteration: "Sagaru Otoko ~Sekai wa Nerawarete Iru~" (Japanese: 「下がる男｣ 〜世界は狙われている〜)	Satoshi Ōsedo	Ayuna Fujisaki	October 9, 2007
Anzelotte explains that Elis is a Night Wizard, and that she is the key to defeating the Emulators by creating a gateway to Rikai, the Emulators' world using her bracelet. She reveals that the jewel in her bracelet is the Jewel of Kindness, one of the seven Jewels of Virtue, and having all seven would create the gateway. Elis agrees to search for the remaining jewels, and Renji and Kureha are assigned to protect her. They enjoy dinner at Elis' house, and the following day, are called back by Anzelotte, who has found the Jewel of Wisdom on the mystical continent of Magallanica. However, Bell Zephyr sends the Demon Lord RaRa Mu to retrieve the jewel or kill Elis. When Renji, Elis, and Kureha arrive in a deserted city in Magallanica, they are accosted by golems summoned by RaRa Mu. They are soon reinforced by Akari, who dispatches one of the golems.
3	"The Two Flames ~Fallen Magallanica~"; Transliteration: "Futatsu no Honō ~Ochite Megaranika~" (Japanese: 「二つの炎｣ 〜堕ちてメガラニカ〜)	Takayuki Fukuda	Ayuna Fujisaki	October 16, 2007
Renji, Kureha, and Akari defeat the rest of the golems and proceed into the tower before them. Elis begins to have continuous headaches indicating the jewel is near. Although the group encounters numerous traps, Renji triggers all of them. They then stop to eat, and Elis uses her new Lunar Cloak to summon food she previously made. As they proceed, they come upon a mural on the wall showing ancient wizards fighting Shaimal, an ancient Demon Lord. They eventually find the Jewel of Wisdom, but are attacked by armors animated by RaRa Mu. Elis manages to retrieve the jewel using clues from the mural, and the other three defeat the armors. RaRa Mu appears, disguising herself as Akari, but Elis' strategy enables them to expose RaRa Mu and defeat her. As they leave, Elis manages to elicit a friendly reaction from the stoic Akari, but then collapses, sensing a jewel on the moon.
4	"Kirihito ~The Encounter on the Moon Surface~"; Transliteration: "Kirihito ~Getsumen no Deai~" (Japanese: 「キリヒト」〜月面の出逢い〜)	Yukihiro Miyamoto	Kiyoko Yoshimura	October 23, 2007
Anzelotte sends Renji, Elis, Kureha, and Akari to the Moon in a spacecraft to find the third jewel. On the way, the four study for their upcoming finals, with Renji furious that he has to repeat a year and do the same material. The ship is then attacked by rabbits with hammers, and the four are separated across the Moon. Elis is attacked by more rabbits, but saved by a young boy who disappears afterwards. Akari meets Elis and the four proceed to a large man-made structure. They are attacked by the Demon Lord Jō ga, who uses the Jewel of Fortitude to ward off Akari's attack and absorb Elis. Renji arrives to save her, but is overwhelmed. Elis awakens and while in a trance-like state, takes the jewel from Jō ga, enabling Renji to defeat her. Afterwards, the group is confronted by the young man, who berates Renji for not protecting Elis. As he leaves, he tells Elis his name is Kirihito.
5	"Abandoned Island ~The Two Demon Sword Users~"; Transliteration: "Kotō ~Futari no Makentsukai~" (Japanese: 「孤島」〜二人の魔剣使い〜)	Atsushi Nakayama	Ayuna Fujisaki	October 30, 2007
Renji is embarrassed when Anzelotte announces he failed his exams over the school intercom, and is subsequently dispatched with the others to recover the Jewel of Fortitude from Andō Kurusu, a Night Wizard and Demon Sword wielder, similar to Renji. However, Andō refuses to give them the jewel, and easily defeats Renji, questioning his rationale for battling. Elis later goes to Andō, giving him snacks and staying with him throughout the day. Andō reveals that Anzelotte once ordered him to finish a mission at the cost of his friend Yū's life. Two Emulators arrive, and when Andō cautions Renji that they are too powerful for him, Renji responds that he will protect Elis as well as save the world. Impressed, Andō gives Renji his sword, and he defeats the two Emulators. Afterwards, Elis retrieves the jewel, and Renji promises to duel Andō when their mission is concluded.
6	"Nightmare ~The Sleeping Elis~"; Transliteration: "Akumu ~Erisu Mezamezu~" (Japanese: 「悪夢」〜エリス目覚めず〜)	Yūsaku Kiryū	Kiyoko Yoshimura	November 6, 2007
Anzelotte reveals that she possessed the Jewel of Temperance; however, when Elis retrieves it, she falls asleep. With the aid of a dream user named Nightmare, Renji, Kureha, and Akari go into Elis' dream, which contains images of her childhood and passions. As they follow a child Elis through a cake-filled city, they come upon Kirihito, who admonishes them for wasting time. They find Elis, but she refuses to leave due to the instructions of her "uncle." However, Nightmare exposes him as Pheus Mor, a Demon Lord. Elis flees into a contained space, and Renji follows her, convincing her to return to the real world. Elis releases her bracelet, calling it Ain Soph Aur, and drains Pheus Mor's power, enabling Renji to defeat her. They then return to the real world. That evening, as Elis is dreaming, a weakened Pheus Mor discovers a doorway in Elis' dream, and is horrified at what she sees within it. She is then confronted by Kirihito, who kills her.
7	"Small Bonds ~Elis's Gift~"; Transliteration: "Chiisana Kizuna ~Erisu no Okurimono~" (Japanese: 「小さな絆」〜エリスの贈り物〜)	Hazuki Mizumoto	Ayuna Fujisaki	November 13, 2007
Using a machine, Anzelotte's technicians perform a check on Akari's body. She then goes to the next room to a comatose Mikoto Shingyōji, and promises to save the world as he once did. Elis celebrates Akari's coming to the apartment with a party, and Elis brings her ferret, Domperi. The next day, Renji, Elis, and Akari go to a skating class, where Renji helps Elis with her skating. As they eat lunch, Akari reveals her own poorly made lunch, which Renji quickly eats to avoid having Elis eat it. Anzelotte arrives, and promises that they can enjoy the day without a mission. Elis eventually manages to skate without Renji's help, and buys skating pendants for everyone afterwards. Renji, who had not gotten a pendant, finds one in his jacket, and remarks that he wishes such days could continue. Meanwhile, numerous Demon Lords have begun invading Earth, with their target being Elis.
8	"Leaping Through Time ~Young Girl's Tower~"; Transliteration: "Jidai o Kakeru ~Shōjo no Tō~" (Japanese: 「時代を翔ける」〜少女の塔〜)	Yūji Kumazawa	Kiyoko Yoshimura	November 20, 2007
Renji, Elis, Kureha, and Akari begin clearing out the Astronomy Club room, and as Kureha and Akari leave, Renji and Elis are sent into the past. Elis arrives next to the Demon Lord Amy. Renji finds himself in town, and after defeating a group of humans under Amy's rule, gets a call from Anzelotte, who informs him that he is in 5000 B.C. She then dispatches him to find Elis, and when Renji goes to the tower before him, he is attacked by several Emulators. Kirihito saves him, and reveals that the tower is a device to summon Shaimaril. Elsewhere, Elis manages to escape from her cell, but Amy summons Shaimaril, intending to sacrifice Elis to him. Renji saves her, and Kirihito begins destroying the tower. Shaimal notices him, and fires a gigantic energy blast at him before disappearing. Amy is infuriated, but Elis finds the Jewel of Justice, and forms Ain Soph Aur into a giant sword, defeating Amy. The two of them return to their time, and Kirihito destroys the tower.
9	"Pandora's Box ~Bell versus Anzelotte~"; Transliteration: "Pandora no Hako ~Beru Tai Anzerotto~" (Japanese: 「パンドラの匣」〜ベル対アンゼロット〜)	Satoshi Ōsedo	Ayuna Fujisaki	November 27, 2007
As Renji, Elis, Kureha, and Akari go to school, Anzelotte brings them to her castle, where she reveals that the Jewel of Hope is in Saturn's rings. As she approaches Saturn with her wizard fleet, a horde of Emulators under Bell Zephyr's command appears. Anzelotte dispatches Renji, Elis, and Kureha to find the jewel, and prepares to attack the Emulators. However, the Demon Lord Lion Gunta predicts all of Anzelotte's ships' movements, and the Emulators take the advantage. Bell Zephyr then goes into battle, and tears through the wizards' defenses. She claims the Jewel of Hope, but a distraction by Akari allows Elis to claim the Jewel of Hope, something Lion comments she was unable to predict. As the jewel joins her bracelet, the jewels turn red, and a gigantic energy exudes from Elis, destroying most of both fleets. Elis then begins to destroy everything around her until Renji calms her, with Elis tearfully asking what she is doing. Anzelotte then realizes that Elis is Shaimal.
10	"Destructive God ~Plank of Carneades~"; Transliteration: "Hakaishin ~Karuneadesu no Ita~" (Japanese: 「破壊神」〜カルネアデスの板〜)	Yukio Kuroda	Kiyoko Yoshimura	December 4, 2007
Anzelotte discusses the situation with Elis with her aides, noting that her power forced both fleets to retreat. Meanwhile, Bell Zephyr confers with Lion, who reveals that Shaimal will destroy everything when released. Renji, Kureha, and Akari confront Anzelotte, who tells them that Elis can awaken into Shaimal at any time. Anzelotte confers with Gazer, her god, and confronts him over why he ordered her to recover the seven jewels. Under his orders, she orders Elis to be executed, but the execution team is overwhelmed by Elis' awakened powers. Elis regains her sense of self and tries to escape. Kirihito arrives and dispatches the guards trying to attack her, and with Renji, the three go to Earth. The three then decide to visit Elis' orphanage, and wizards begin attacking them, with Akari watching them in the background.
11	"Fragments of the Memories ~Dance in Phantasm~"; Transliteration: "Kioku no Kakera ~Gensō ni, Mau~" (Japanese: 「記憶の欠片」〜幻想に, 舞う〜)	Keiji Gotoh	Ayuna Fujisaki	December 11, 2007
Renji and Elis head toward her orphanage on train, with Renji comforting her on the way. Bell Zephyr decides to go to expose the person behind Shaimal's awakening, and leaves with Lion. Renji and Elis arrive at the orphanage, where they discover that Elis' "uncle" cannot be contacted. Elis enjoys a blissful time with the children; however, when she begins to review photos of her past, she disappears in all the photos. When she talks with the children and the orphanage caretaker, they fail to remember her. Renji and Elis are then confronted by Akari, who engages them. Renji manages to defeat her, and Akari leaves to be with Mikoto. Bell Zephyr and Lion forcibly enter Anzelotte's castle, and begin to converse with her. Meanwhile, Renji, Elis, and Kirihito come to the old sakura tree near the school, where Kureha attacks them.
12	"Farewell"; Transliteration: "Sayonara" (Japanese: さよなら)	Takayuki Fukuda	Kiyoko Yoshimura	December 18, 2007
In a flashback, Kureha recalls getting a Christmas present from Renji in her youth, despite the fact that her family did not celebrate Christmas. In the present, Kureha is determined to kill Elis, but when Renji offers his body as a shield to protect her, she relents. However, Kirihito kills Kureha, and reveals that he is the "uncle" Elis has been waiting for, as well as Gazer, the observer of the world, now determined to reduce it to nothingness and start over. Elis, convinced that all of the transpired events are her fault, awakens Shaimal, and begins destroying the surrounding city. Elsewhere, Bell Zephyr convinces Anzelotte to ask Gazer as to the turn of events, and Gazer admits using Anzelotte to fulfill his plan. Meanwhile, Elis lies at the heart of Shaimal, accepting her fate, as Renji yells desperately at her from below.
13	"Happy Birthday"; Transliteration: "Happī Bāsudei" (Japanese: ハッピー·バースデイ)	Yūsuke Yamamoto; Yūji Kumazawa	Ayuna Fujisaki	December 25, 2007
Renji resolves to go after Elis, but is blasted to the ground by Kirihito, who instructs Elis to destroy him. Anzelotte orders a barrier be created to protect Renji and teleports the surrounding area to her castle. The wizard forces begin to attack Kirihito and Shaimal, but are quickly overwhelmed. Bell Zephyr retrieves Renji and begins fighting Kirihito. With Nightmare's aid, he and Renji enter Elis' dream world. Meanwhile, Akari brings Kureha's body back to Anzelotte, who revives her with the aid of Lion Gunta. In the dream world, Renji enters a door into the darkness of Elis' heart, and when Elis sees that Kureha is alive, she manages to break free of Shaimal. Elis uses Ain Soph Aur to pierce through Kirihito's defenses and Renji defeats him. In the epilogue, Renji manages to graduate from school, but is picked up by Anzelotte for another mission. As Elis looks at him leaving, she resolves to continue to be his friend, even though she has lost her abilities as a wizard.
