= List of fantasy anime =

This is a list of fantasy anime television series, films, and OVAs. Titles are in alphabetical order.

== 0–11 ==
- 3×3 Eyes
- 07-Ghost
- 10 Tokyo Warriors
- 11eyes

== A ==
- Absolute Duo
- Ah My Buddha
- Air
- Ajin: Demi-Human
- Akahori Gedou Hour Rabuge
- Akame ga Kill!
- Akatsuki no Yona: Yona of the Dawn
- Akazukin Chacha
- Amatsuki
- Amon Saga
- The Ancient Magus' Bride
- Angel Beats!
- Angel Sanctuary
- Angel Tales
- Angelique
- Anohana: The Flower We Saw That Day
- Anti-Magic Academy: The 35th Test Platoon
- Arata: The Legend
- Arc the Lad
- Arcana
- The Asterisk War
- Asura Cryin'
- Atelier Escha & Logy: Alchemists of the Dusk Sky
- Attack on Titan
- Aura Battler Dunbine
- Ayakashi

== B ==
- Babel II
- Baccano!
- Basilisk
- Bastard!!
- The Beast Player Erin
- Beet the Vandel Buster
- Belle
- Berserk
- Beyond the Boundary (Kyōkai no Kanata)
- Big Order
- Bikini Warriors
- Black Blood Brothers
- Black Butler
- Black Clover
- Black God (Kuro Kami)
- Blade of the Immortal
- Black Rock Shooter
- Bleach
- Blood-C
- Blood Reign: Curse of the Yoma
- Bludgeoning Angel Dokuro-Chan
- Blue Blink
- Blue Exorcist
- Blue Dragon
- Boogiepop Phantom
- Bottle Fairy (Binzume Yōsei)
- Busou Renkin

== C ==
- Cardcaptor Sakura
- Cardfight!! Vanguard
- Ceres, Celestial Legend
- A Certain Magical Index (Toaru Majutsu no Indekkusu)
- Chainsaw Man
- Champignon no Majo
- Charlotte
- Children Who Chase Lost Voices
- Chrome Shelled Regios
- Clannad
- Claymore
- Creamy Mami, the Magic Angel
- The Case Study of Vanitas

== D ==
- D.Gray-man
- D.N.Angel
- Da Capo
- Da Capo II
- Da Capo III
- Damekko Dōbutsu
- Date A Live
- Death Note
- Death Parade
- Deltora Quest
- Demon Slayer
- Descendants of Darkness (Yami no Matsuei)
- Detatoko Princess
- Di Gi Charat
- Dinosaur King
- Dog Days
- Dragon Ball
- Dragon Ball Z
- Dragon Ball Super
- Dragon Crisis!
- Dragon Drive
- Dragon Half
- Dragon Quest
- Dragon Quest: Dai no Daibōken
- Dragon Quest: Emblem of Roto
- Dragon's Dogma
- Dragonaut: The Resonance
- Dream Eater Merry (Yumekui Merī)
- Dream Hunter REM
- Dusk Maiden of Amnesia
- Danganronpa

== E ==
- Earth Maiden Arjuna (Chikyū Shōjo Arujuna)
- Eden's Bowy
- El-Hazard
- Elemental Gelade
- Elf Princess Rane (Fairy Princess Ren)
- Endride
- Escaflowne
- EDENS ZERO

== F ==
- Fairy Tail
- Fancy Lala (Mahō no Stage Fancy Lala)
- Fate/kaleid liner Prisma Illya
- Fate/Extra Last Encore
- Fate/stay night
- Fate/Zero
- Fighting Foodons
- Final Fantasy: Legend of the Crystals
- Final Fantasy: Unlimited
- Final Fantasy VII: Last Order
- Fire Emblem
- Flame of Recca (Rekka no Honō)
- Frieren
- Fruits Basket
- Full Moon o Sagashite (In Search of the Full Moon)
- Fullmetal Alchemist (Hagane no Renkinjutsushi)
- Fullmetal Alchemist: Brotherhood
- Fushigi Yûgi (Fushigi Yûgi: The Mysterious Play)
- Fushigiboshi no Futagohime (Twin Princesses of the Wonder Planet)

== G ==
- Gate
- Gate Keepers
- Gensomaden Saiyuki
- Ghost Slayers Ayashi (Tenpō Ibun Ayakashi Ayashi)
- Goblin Slayer
- Grander Musashi
- Grimgar of Fantasy and Ash
- Ground Defense Force! Mao-chan
- Guilty Crown
- Guin Saga

== H ==
- Haibane Renmei
- Hakushaku to Yōsei
- Earl and Fairy
- Haikyu!!
- Hans Christian Andersen's The Little Mermaid
- Happiness!
- Hare Tokidoki Buta (Tokyo Pig)
- Hellsing
- Heroic Age
- The Heroic Legend of Arslan
- Hetalia: Axis Powers
- High School DxD
- Hiiro no Kakera
- Hime-sama Goyōjin
- Himitsu no Akko-chan
- xxxHolic
- Howl's Moving Castle
- Hoshin Engi (Soul Hunter)
- Hunter × Hunter
- Hyperdimension Neptunia: The Animation (Chōjigen Geimu Neputeyūnu)

== I ==
- I Couldn't Become a Hero, So I Reluctantly Decided to Get a Job (Yu-Shibu, Yūsha ni Narenakatta Ore wa Shibushibu Shūshoku o Ketsui Shimashita)
- Inari, Konkon, Koi Iroha
- Inuyasha
- Inukami!
- Inu x Boku SS (Inu x Boku Secret Service)
- Is It Wrong to Try to Pick Up Girls in a Dungeon?
- Is This a Zombie?
- I Am a Cat
- I Love My Younger Sister
- Idol Memories
- I Can't Understand What My Husband Is Saying
- Ingress

== J ==
- Jing: King of Bandits
- Jewelpet
- JoJo's Bizarre Adventure
- Junkers Come Here
- Jujutsu Kaisen
- Juni Taisen
- Jigoku Sensei Nube
- Jigoku Shojo
- Jin
- Just Because!
- Joran: The Princess of Snow and Blood
- Jinsei

== K ==
- Kamichu!
- Mekakucity Actors
- Kagihime Monogatari Eikyū Alice Rondo
- Kamichama Karin
- Kamisama Kiss (Kamisama Hajimemashita)
- Kekkaishi
- Kanon
- Kiba
- Kiki's Delivery Service (Majo no Takkyūbin)
- Kirby: Right Back at Ya! (Hoshi no Kirby)
- Kobato.
- Koi suru Tenshi Angelique
- KonoSuba
- Kuromajo-san ga Toru!!
- Kyo Kara Maoh!
- Kakegurui

== L ==
- Legend of Crystania
- The Legend of Snow White
- Legendz
- Lilpri
- Little Busters!
- Little Witch Academia
- Little Nemo: Adventures In Slumberland (1989 American & Japanese collaboration)
- A Little Snow Fairy Sugar (Chitchana Yukitsukai Shugā)
- Living for the Day After Tomorrow (Asatte no Hōkō)
- Log Horizon
- Lord Marksman and Vanadis
- Loveless

== M ==
- Maburaho
- Made in Abyss
- Magi: The Labyrinth of Magic
- Magi: The Kingdom of Magic
- Magic Knight Rayearth
- Magic User's Club (Mahō Tsukai Tai!)
- Magical Canan
- Magical Girl Lyrical Nanoha
- Magical Girl Lyrical Nanoha A's
- Magical Girl Lyrical Nanoha Strikers
- Magical Meow Meow Taruto
- Magical Princess Minky Momo
- Magical Warfare (Mahō Sensō)
- Magikano
- Mahōjin Guru Guru
- Makai Senki Disgaea
- Mamotte! Lollipop
- Mamotte Shugogetten
- Maoyu
- MapleStory
- Maquia: When the Promised Flower Blooms (Sayonara no Asa ni Yakusoku no Hana o Kazarō)
- MÄR (Märchen Awakens Romance)
- Maria the Virgin Witch
- Master of Epic: The Animation Age
- Maze
- Megami Paradise
- Mermaid Melody Pichi Pichi Pitch
- Mirmo!
- Miss Kobayashi's Dragon Maid (Kobayashi-san Chi no Maidragon)
- Miyuki-chan in Wonderland
- Mob Psycho 100
- Moeyo Ken (Kidō Shinsengumi Moeyo Ken)
- Mon Colle Knights
- Monogatari (series)
- Monster Musume
- Moribito: Guardian of the Spirit (Seirei no Moribito)
- The Morose Mononokean
- Munto
- Murder Princess
- Muromi-san
- Mushishi
- My Bride Is a Mermaid (Seto no Hanayome)
- My Hero Academia
- My-HiME
- My Neighbor Totoro (Tonari no Totoro)
- My-Otome
- Myriad Colors Phantom World
- My Happy Marriage
- Mysterious Thief Saint Tail (Kaitō Seinto Tēru)

== N ==
- Naruto
- Naruto Shippūden
- Natsume's Book of Friends
- Negima! Magister Negi Magi
- Neo Ranga
- Night Wizard!
- Nura: Rise of the Yokai Clan
- Nurse Witch Komugi
- No Game No Life
- Noragami
- Nar Doma
- Naria Girls
- Needless
- Neighborhood Story
- NANA

== O ==
- Ōban Star-Racers
- Oh My Goddess! (Aa! Megamisama!)
- Ojamajo Doremi (Magical DoReMi)
- Ojarumaru
- Oku-sama wa Mahō Shōjo: Bewitched Agnes
- Omishi Magical Theater: Risky Safety
- One Piece
- One-Punch Man
- Otogi-Jūshi Akazukin
- Outlaw Star
- Overlord
- Oshi no Ko
- Oreshura
- Oregairu
- Oresuki

== P ==
- Pandora Hearts
- Panzer World Galient
- Parasyte
- Persona 4: The Animation
- Petite Princess Yucie (Puchi Puri Yucie)
- Petopeto-san
- Piano No Mori
- Pita-Ten
- Pixie Pop
- Plunderer 300 years ago the world was in war
- Pokémon
- Pom Poko (Heisei Tanuki Gassen Ponpoko)
- Ponyo (Gake no Ue no Ponyo)
- Popotan
- Prétear (Shin Shirayuki-hime Densetsu Purītia)
- Pretty Cure
- Princess Mononoke (Mononoke-hime)
- Princess Tutu
- Prism Ark
- Puella Magi Madoka Magica

== Q ==
- Queen's Blade
- Queen's Blade Rebellion
- Quiz Magic Academy
- Queen Emeraldas
- Q-Taro the Ghost
- Qualidea Code

== R ==
- Rage of Bahamut: Genesis (Shingeki no Bahamut Genesis)
- Ragnarok the Animation
- Rakudai Kishi no Cavalry
- Rakugo Tennyo Oyui
- Ranma ½
- Rave Master
- Record of Lodoss War
- Renkin 3-kyū Magical? Pokān
- Rental Magica
- Revolutionary Girl Utena (Shoujo Kakumei Utena)
- Re:Zero kara Hajimeru Isekai Seikatsu
- RG Veda
- Romeo × Juliet
- Ronin Warriors (Yoroiden Samurai Troopers)
- Rozen Maiden
- Ruin Explorers (Hikyou Tanken ...)
- Rune Soldier (Magical Soldier Louie)
- Rosario + Vampire

== S ==
- Sailor Moon
- Sailor Moon Crystal
- Saint October
- Saint Tail (Kaitou Saint Tail)
- Sakura Wars
- Samurai Champloo
- Samurai Girl: Real Bout High School
- Sanzoku no Musume Rōnya
- Scrapped Princess
- Seisen Cerberus
- Seraph of the End
- Seven Deadly Sins
- Shakugan no Shana
- Shamanic Princess
- Shattered Angels (Kyōshirō to Towa no Sora)
- Shigofumi: Letters from the Departed
- Shin Angyo Onshi
- Shining Tears X Wind
- Shinkyoku Sōkai Polyphonica
- Shugo Chara!
- Shuffle!
- Sisters of Wellber
- Slayers
- Sorcerous Stabber Orphen: Beginning
- Sorcerous Stabber Orphen: Revenge
- Sorcerous Stabber Orphen: Wayward Journey (2020)
- Soul Eater
- Spice and Wolf
- Spirited Away (Sen to Chihiro no Kamikakushi)
- Strange Dawn
- Strike the Blood
- Sugar Sugar Rune
- Sword Art Online

== T ==
- Tai-Madō Gakuen 35 Shiken Shōtai
- Tales from Earthsea
- Tales of the Abyss
- Tales of Phantasia: The Animation
- Tales of Symphonia
- Tales of Zestiria the X
- Tatsu no ko Taro (Taro the Dragon Boy)
- Tayutama: Kiss on my Deity
- Tears to Tiara
- Tenbatsu! Angel Rabbie (Heaven's Judgement! XX Angel Rabbie)
- Tenkai Knights
- The Betrayal Knows My Name (Uragiri wa Boku no Namae o Shitteiru)
- The Cat Returns
- The Cosmopolitan Prayers
- The Devil Is a Part-Timer!
- The Familiar of Zero (Zero no Tsukaima)
- The Genie Family
- The Great Adventure of Horus, Prince of the Sun
- The Good Witch of the West
- The Heroic Legend of Arslan
- The Irregular at Magic High School
- The Law of Ueki
- The Legend of the Legendary Heroes
- The Melancholy Of Haruhi Suzumiya
- The Mythical Detective Loki Ragnarok
- The Pilot's Love Song
- The Promised Neverland
- The Rising of the Shield Hero
- The Qwaser of Stigmata
- The Sea Prince and the Fire Child
- The Seven Deadly Sins
- The Severing Crime Edge
- The Snow Queen
- The Story of Saiunkoku (Saiunkoku Monogatari)
- The Testament of Sister New Devil
- The Tower of Druaga
- The Twelve Kingdoms (Jūni Kokuki)
- The Vision of Escaflowne
- The Weakest Tamer Began a Journey to Pick Up Trash
- The World God Only Knows
- The World Is Still Beautiful (Soredemo Sekai wa Utsukushii)
- Those Who Hunt Elves
- Tōka Gettan
- Tokyo Mew Mew
- Tokyo Babylon
- Tokyo Ghoul
- Tokyo Ravens
- Trigun
- Trinity Seven
- Tsubasa: Reservoir Chronicle
- Tweeny Witches (Mahou Shoujo Tai Arusu)
- Tokyo Revengers
- Toilet-bound Hanako-kun

== U ==
- Unbreakable Machine-Doll (Mashin-Dōru wa Kizutsukanai)
- Unico
- Unlimited Fafnir
- Ushio and Tora
- Uta Kata
- Utawarerumono
- Undead Unluck
- Under Ninja
- Undead Girl Murder Farce
- Usavich
- Uncle from Another World
- UFO Baby
- Ultraman
- Undefeated Bahamut Chronicle
- Useless Animals
- Upotte!!
- Urusei Yatsura
- Uninhabited Planet Survive!
- Unico
- Ultra Maniac

== V ==
- Vinland Saga
- Violinist of Hameln
- Violet Evergarden
- Vagrant Story
- Val × Love
- Vampire Hunter D
- Valkyrie Drive
- Valkyrie Profile
- Vampire Dormitory

== W ==
- Wedding Peach (Ai Tenshi Densetsu Wedingu Pīchi)
- When Supernatural Battles Became Commonplace
- Windaria
- Wind: A Breath of Heart
- Witch Craft Works
- Witch Hunter Robin
- Wizard Barristers
- Wolf Children (Ōkami Kodomo no Ame to Yuki)
- Wolf's Rain
- Words Bubble Up Like Soda Pop

== X ==
- X
- X/1999 (X)
- Xenosaga

== Y ==
- Yami to Bōshi to Hon no Tabibito (Darkness, the Hat, and the Travelers of the Books, Yamibō)
- Yo-Kai Watch
- Yobarete Tobidete Akubi-chan
- Yoshinaga-san Chi no Gargoyle
- Yōtōden
- Yumeria
- Ys
- Yu-Gi-Oh!
- Yu-Gi-Oh! GX
- Yu-Gi-Oh! 5D's
- Yu-Gi-Oh! Zexal
- Yu-Gi-Oh! Arc-V
- Yu-Gi-Oh! VRAINS
- Yu-Gi-Oh! Sevens
- Yurikuma Arashi
- Yu Yu Hakusho

== Z ==
- Zatch Bell! (Konjiki no Gash Bell!!)
- Zenki (Kishin Dōji Zenki)
- Zom 100: Bucket List of the Dead
- Zero no Tsukaima
- Zombie Land Saga
- Z Gundam

== See also ==
- Categories: Fantasy, magical girl, and supernatural anime and manga
