= List of The Dreamers characters =

This is a list of The Dreamers characters. The Dreamers is a fantasy epic saga written by David Eddings.

== Gods ==
There are eight Gods in the Land of Drahll. Four sleep while the other work for 25 eons, then the cycle ends, and they switch places. Each God, when awake, holds power over one of the Four Domains: North, South, East, and West.

=== Ara ===
Ara is something beyond the Elder Gods and Dreamers. She is the wife of Omago. She has much more power than the other gods and the Dreamers seem to have a deep connection with them. The Gods call her 'Mother', although only the Younger Gods know that she is Ara. In "The Treasured One", she communicates with Longbow, warning him and the other warriors to get out of the way for the Church Armies of the Trogite Empire that she is controlling. She stays in regular contact with the Dreamers, and in the wars of the North and South, she plays a huge role in the victories over the Vlagh. Everyone refers to her as the 'Unknown Friend'. Trenicia realizes that Ara is Unknown Friend, but is advised to keep it a secret.

=== Elder Gods ===
Dalhaine - The Elder God of the North. He was the one who woke the younger gods early, without telling his siblings, and attempted to erase their knowledge of who they were. His Domain is attacked in Crystal Gorge. He lives in a cave on Mt. Shrak with his Dreamer, Ashad (Dakas). He hires an army of horse warriors from the Land of Malavi.

Aracia - The former Elder God of the East. She lives in a temple in East Drahll with her Dreamer Lillabeth (Enalla) and many servants who keep telling her how beautiful she is. Her Domain is attacked in The Younger Gods. She hired an army of warrior women from the Isle of Akalla.Later obliterates herself in a desperate attempt to keep her power from Lillabeth.

Zelana - The Elder God of the West. She hid away in a grotto cave on the Isle of Thurn many eons before (she claims a dozen or so) because she was offended by the behaviour of her people. The war drew her and her Dreamer Eleria (Balacenia) out of their home. She hired an army of Maags to fight in the war. Her Domain is attacked in The Elder Gods.

Veltan - The Elder God of the South. Other than Aracia, he is the only god who frequently visits the people of his Domain, or at least, communicates with them. He lives in a house he made out of only one stone, with his Dreamer Yaltar (Vash). A nearby farmer, Omago, and his wife, Ara, often take care of Yaltar, and everyone in the South of Drahll usually passes information to Veltan through Omago, as they are good friends. His Domain is attacked in "The Treasured One". Like Dalhaine, he has tamed a thunderbolt to ride around on, which comes in handy during the war, particularly in the ravine before the eruption of Yaltar's volcanoes. His thunderbolt is not as well-tamed as Dalhaine's, though, and often showers him with assorted profanities.

=== Younger Gods ===
The Younger Gods were not supposed to wake up as early as they did, before the end of the Elder Gods' cycle. But Dalhaine felt that they would be of help during the upcoming war against the Vlagh. They were reawoken as the Dreamers, originally with no memory of their past lives. But they begin to break through the mental barrier, starting with Balacenia, and realize who they are, but decide to keep it a secret.

Dakas/Ashad - Younger God of the North. Ashad was the Dreamer who predicted, in The Treasured One, that the next attack would be on Veltan's Domain, and warned them of a second army coming up from behind. When Dalhaine first brought the Younger Gods back as the Dreamers, he turned to a mother bear named Mama Broken-Tooth to feed him. His "Dream Stone" is rare black agate, which he found in Mama Broken-Tooth's cave.

Enalla/Lillabeth - Younger God of the East. Lillabeth is Aracia's Dreamer, and her 'Dream Stone' is an abalone seashell. She, like Eleria, has the tendency to call Rabbit 'Bunny'.

Balacenia/Eleria - Younger God of the West. Eleria is Zelana's Dreamer, the first to have one of the special dreams. She tends to be a very sweet little child, and some people tend to pick up her childish phrases, such as 'Kiss-kiss' and 'Teenie-weenie'. Her 'Dream Stone' is a large pink pearl the size of an apple.

Vash/Yaltar - Younger God of the South. Yaltar is Veltan's Dreamer. His 'Dream Stone' is a fire opal. His first dream pinpointed the exact location of the first attack, in the ravine near Lattash.

== Maags ==
The Land of Maag lies to the west of Dhrall. Its inhabitants tend to be rather rowdy, and most make their living as pirates.

Captain Sorgan Hook-Beak - Captain of the Seagull. Zelana placed him in charge of all the Maag armies she hired for the war. Eleria teases him by calling him "Hook-Big". His two cousins, Skell and Torl, have command over other parts of his fleet, but he still in charge of the entire fleet.

Rabbit - Smithy on the Seagull. Many thought he was dim-witted, but he actually hid his cleverness to avoid being set difficult tasks. He discovered he could tell the position of the ship by the stars in the sky, and is the only one who knows that the Seagull is farther away from the Land of Maag than everyone else thinks. Eleria and Lillabeth call him "Bunny", and in return, he calls her "Baby Sister". He, Keselo, and Longbow are good friends. One of the first outlanders to learn the secret of the Dreamers, the other being Keselo.

Skell - Sorgan's elder cousin. Led the advance fleet of Maags to Lattash.

Ox - Sorgan's first mate. Described by Rabbit as having 'muscles on top of muscles from his head to his toenails'.

Kryda Ham-Hand - Sorgan's second mate. Named after his meaty hands.

Kaldo Tree-top - Crow's nest crewman on the Seagull. Tallest Maag, noted to be 'well over seven feet tall' in "The Elder Gods".

Hammer - Smith on The Shark. Was skeptical about Longbow's archery skills, so he had to walk around half a mile down the beach with a clamshell, only to have Longbow shatter it with an arrow, to get proof.

Kajak - Maag ship captain. Rallied his four cousins in "The Elder Gods" to attack the Seagull in the Maag port of Kweta, and steal the hundred blocks of gold on board. He was thwarted when Eleria had a dream warning them of the attack. She and Zelana informed Longbow, who enlisted Rabbit's help. Kajak was killed by one of Longbow's arrows, while screaming at his men to stop running away.

== Trogites ==
The Trogite Empire lies south of Dhrall, and its inhabitants are slightly more civilized than those of Maag.

Commander Narasan - Commander of the Trogite army hired by Veltan to fight in the War of Dhrall. He threw away his uniform when his nephew Astal was killed in battle, and only returned to his military career when Veltan approached him with his offer. Until then, Keselo was often sent to try to persuade him.

Keselo - Junior officer in Narasan's army. Described as being more clever than most of the senior officers, and known for spoiling good, long arguments by coming up with simple compromises. Has developed a friendship with Rabbit, Red-Beard, and Longbow, as well as Omago. One of the first outlanders to learn of the gods' secrets.

Gunda - He is a 'first-rate' fort builder and thinks everything is about twice as big, as written in the first book, "The Elder Gods". He is Narasan's childhood friend, along with Padan.

Andar - A Subcommander in Narasan's army. He terrorizes Holy Takal Bersla of Aracia's Temple, with the threat of 'cannibalism', when Bersla doesn't believe that Aracia's domain is in any harm from the Vlagh's bugs.

Padan - Narasan's childhood friend. He pretends to be a Maag in the fourth book, "The Younger Gods"

== Dhralls ==
=== Zelana's/Balacenia's Domain (WEST) ===
Longbow - A member of Chief Old-Bear's tribe, he is described as "A tall man with long blond braids and wearing leather clothing, quite lean, with a hard face." He is extremely skilled with a bow, never missing a target. He hates the Vlagh with such a passion that he dedicated more than half his life to kill it and the Bug People. It is later revealed that a mutated bug, from the Vlagh, had killed Misty-Water (Longbow's Bride), on the day of Longbow's wedding.

Red-beard - Reluctant Chieftain of (new) Lattash, after the first Lattash was destroyed by Yaltar's (Vash) lava, from the twin volcanoes he made erupt to kill the Bug People (The previous chief, White-Braid, was distraught, and sank into depression). He has a whole section of the third book, "Crystal Gorge" dedicated to him, aptly titled "The Reluctant Chieftain".

=== Veltan's/Vash's Domain (SOUTH) ===
Omago - Ara's husband Omago. He received education from Veltan when he was younger. In the last book, he is revealed to be "Eternal Omago" the father of the 8 Gods Of Dhrall

Ara - Omago's wife. She first saw Omago when she was sixteen, quite bluntly saying "My name is Ara. I'm sixteen years old and I want you!". She is the Treasured One, Longbow's 'unknown friend', and The Mother of The 8 Gods of Dhrall

=== Dahlaine's/Dakas' Domain (NORTH) ===
Athlan, Tlantar Two-Hands and the different "Nations" set up by Elder God Dahlaine of the North

=== Aracia's/Enalla's Domain (EAST) ===
None. The Maags and Trogites did the work, the priests were ordered to assist them, but they complained quite loudly.

=== Others ===
Queen Trenicia- Warrior Queen of the isle Akalla. Most men appear inferior to her, but she falls in love with Narasan, leader of the trogite army.

== See also ==
- The Dreamers
- David Eddings
