= Black Blood Brothers =

Japanese light novel series

- (From Left to Right) Back: Cassandra and Alice; Front: Kotaro, Jiro, and Mimiko
- Light novel
- Written by: Kōhei Azano
- Illustrated by: Yūya Kusaka
- Published by: Fujimi Shobo
- Imprint: Fujimi Fantasia Bunko
- Original run: July 16, 2004 – May 20, 2009
- Volumes: 11 + 6 short stories
- Anime television series
- Directed by: Hiroaki Yoshikawa
- Produced by: Hiroshi Kawamura; Izumi Yamashita; Yutaka Ohashi; Osamu Hosokawa; Hirotsugu Ogisu
- Written by: Yū Sugitani
- Music by: Toshihiko Sahashi
- Studio: Group TAC; Studio Live
- Licensed by: AU: Madman Entertainment (expired); NA: Funimation; UK: Manga Entertainment (expired)
- Original network: Kids Station, Tokyo MX
- English network: US: Funimation Channel, Chiller
- Original run: September 8, 2006 – November 24, 2006
- Episodes: 12
- Manga

Black Blood Brother Ver. C
- Published by: Kadokawa Shoten
- Published: January 30, 2007
- Volumes: 1

Black Blood Brothers, also known as BBB, is a light novel series written by Kōhei Azano and illustrated by Yuuya Kusaka. In 2006, Studio Live and Group TAC produced an anime based on the series. It is directed by Hiroaki Yoshikawa. It was licensed for North American release by Funimation Entertainment, with the first DVD being released in February 2008.

== Plot ==
During a war called the Hong Kong Crusade, an Old Blood vampire, Jiro Mochizuki, a.k.a. the Silver Blade (Gintō), fought and defeated the Kowloon king and most of the Kowloon Children. Ten years later, Jiro heads to Hong Kong with his younger brother, Kotaro Mochizuki, in hopes of reaching The Special Zone, a thriving secret city where Vampires live-(which is separate from the human civilized parts of the city). They soon realize that a plan to infiltrate the Special Zone is being hatched by the Kowloon Children survivors. As they travel to The Special Zone, Jiro encounters enemies from the past and new threats that may endanger the safety of the Special Zone including the citizens. Kotaro's abduction, by one of the Kowloon Children, thrusts him even further into the battle. Along the way, he meets a human girl named Mimiko.

=== Kowloon Shock ===
Within the story, during the 1950s, a vampire who would later be known as the Kowloon King emerged in Hong Kong, China and began spreading his lineage to others. The Kowloon Children, as his bloodline came to be known, differed from other bloodlines in that all humans (Or vampires) bitten by a Kowloon Child would become Kowloon Children themselves, even without a direct infusion of that bloodline's blood. The ensuing chaos made the existence of vampires, which until then had been living in secret, known to the entire world. The conflict culminated in the Holy War, a battle in which humans and vampires worked together to exterminate the Kowloon Children. After the crusade, the Special Zone - a city for vampires to live - was established on the sea outside Japan. After the war, it was announced that all vampires had been killed, and most humans were kept ignorant of the existence of the Special Zone. Jiro Mochizuki, who became known as the Silver Blade, is a hero of the Crusade who defeated the Kowloon King, although he lost his lover and was betrayed by a close friend in the process...

== Characters ==
=== Main characters ===
Jiro Mochizuki (望月 ジロー, Mochizuki Jirō)
Voiced by: Takahiro Sakurai (Japanese); J. Michael Tatum (English)
An Old Blood vampire that sided with the humans to fight against the Kowloon children during the Kowloon Shock. Jiro was transformed into a vampire in 19th Century London. He used to be a lieutenant in the Imperial Japanese Navy until he was severely injured in a fight protecting Alice. Besides being an Old Blood, he also comes from a very special bloodline: the blood of the Sage. He wields a long katana which has a blade made of silver. During the war, after defeating most of the Kowloon children, he became known as the Silver Blade and the Kin-killer. He is able to use some of the Kowloon powers as well as those of his own unique bloodline to be able to challenge even the Kowloon King and the three powers of the Special Zone.
He is weak against sunlight and water. He is shown being burned to the bones from staying into the ocean too long and releasing smoke under the sunlight, even though he was carrying an umbrella. He has a little brother, Kotaro, who is the only other vampire who shares his bloodline. He is considered to be the chosen Guardian. As the chosen guardian, he is devoted to returning the sage's blood, which resides within him, into her reborn body, Kotaro. He reveals to Mimiko that once Kotaro fully matures-(which is never explicitly known at the end) and he gives back the sage's blood, he will no longer be around. Since he took in Kotaro as a newborn following Alice's death, there's a chance that Kotaro could be his adopted son.
Kotaro Mochizuki (望月 コタロウ, Mochizuki Kotarō)
Voiced by: Omi Minami (Japanese); Leah Clark (English)
Jiro's ten-year-old, "younger brother", who does not seem to exhibit powers of a vampire, such as the "Hide Hand." Although, he seems to have an extremely high pain tolerance: as he is thrown into the ground and walls without injury in almost every episode. As commented by Mimiko Katsuragi, he does not appear to be the brother of Jiro since he is not hurt by sunlight nor water, unlike Jiro. Another fact is that they look totally different from each other: Jiro is tall, has black hair and brown eyes, while his brother is short, has blond hair, and blue eyes. Kotaro stated that they are brothers because they are the last two remaining vampires of their special bloodline. They both carry goggles around their necks. He has the same speech pattern and bears a striking resemblance to Jiro's former lover, Alice. Later, it is revealed that Kotaro is actually the reincarnation of Alice. He has no special vampiric powers because he still has not recovered the sage's memories from Jiro. Before leaving for the Special Zone, Kotaro's only friends were Sei's older sister the Dark Princess of the North and Grand Duke Bow-wow (a giant friendly grizzly bear) which he also gives the name to his teddy bear at the end of the series. Since he was taken in as a baby by Jiro, there's a possible chance that Jiro could be his adopted father.
Mimiko Katsuragi (葛城 ミミコ, Katsuragi Mimiko)
Voiced by: Ryoko Nagata (Japanese); Colleen Clinkenbeard (English)
Human compromiser who is sent out to mediate the relationship between humans and vampires. She was an orphan that was raised by the Order Coffin Company, which she now works in. Although considered taboo by the Company, she allowed Jiro to suck a bit of her blood when he was too weak to keep fighting. In the end, she ends up living and working with both Kotaro and Jiro. Mimiko and Alice have similar ideals. She is a strong and independent woman, who tries to understand Jiro's situation and shows that she holds no prejudice against any race.
Cassandra Jill Warlock (カサンドラ·ジル·ウォーロック, Kasandora Jiru Vōrokku)
Voiced by: Miyuki Sawashiro (Japanese); Luci Christian (English)
Often referred to as the Black Snake, Cassandra is an Old Blood vampire that was once friends with Jiro and Alice, however she betrayed them and killed Alice. However, Jiro questions why Cassa, after killing Alice, guarded Alice's ashes. It is later revealed that she is the Lord of the Warlock family and is a reincarnation of Morgan the Witch. Her prestigious bloodline grants her the ability to shapeshift. She was also the first to be bitten by the founder of the Kowloon Children bloodline and was branded a traitor. During a brief conversation with Jiro, she claims that her happiest moments were with Alice and Jiro.
Cassa is an extremely powerful vampire, capable of matching a fully powered Jiro in combat while not having absorbed any blood herself in three months. Her primary weapons are a chained silver cross and a katana. While Cassa is a skilled swordswoman, Jiro always had the advantage over her when it came to swordplay and fighting. Even as a Kowloon child, Cassa enjoyed playing jokes and teasing people. It is revealed in the end that Cassandra's goal all along was to resurrect the Kowloon King and continue his bloodline. Like all vampires, the continuation of their own bloodline is all that they care about, and Cassa is willing to make any sacrifice in order to ensure its survival. The few exceptions to this are the killing of Jiro and the ending of the Sage bloodline.

=== Other characters ===
Left: Sei during the Kowloon Shock; Right: The current Sei.

Sei
Voiced by: Reiko Takagi (Japanese); Carrie Savage (Current Sei), Ian Sinclair (Sei during the Kowloon Shock) (English)
Sei bears the title of Dragon King of the East, or "Ryū-Ō". He also bears the titles Prosecutor of the East and young emissary. He controls the night of Hong Kong and the Special Zone, protecting Red Blood and Black Blood. He's a direct descendant of a chaotic bloodline. Sei also created the barrier and implemented the restrictions that protects the Special Zone. His eyes are the "switch" for opening and closing the barrier. When he opens his eyes, the barrier opens, and vice versa. He could turn into an enormous golden dragon made of pure energy. The current Sei is a now reborn child but before that he was a young adult, mid to late twenties. This took place sometime within the past 10 years. Even though he was reborn into such a "cute" state (as Jiro puts it), Sei is serious and is one of the most powerful vampires in the story, which makes him highly respected. He could easily make a vampire uneasy with his powerful aura. He also has an older sister called the Dark Princess of the North. He is shown to, unlike Kotaro have obtained all his memories from a young age.
Zelman Clock (ゼルマン·クロック, Zeruman Kurokku)
Voiced by: Jun Fukuyama (Japanese); Jerry Jewell (English)
An 800-year-old Old Blood born in Poland on April 1 called Crimson-eye Zelman, and is the bearer of the god's flame and a legend of the Dark Ages. Zelman has many other titles, including the ancient dark hunter, the follower of the Fire God, the red-eyed murderer, and the prince with blood-colored eyes. He is also one of the rulers of the Special Zone. He comes from a glorious bloodline linking to the great warrior, Asura and is noted to be one of the last of that bloodline.
Having inherited the special blood of War God Asura (闘将アスラ), Zelman has a power called Eye Ignite, which enables him to create and control fire.
Zelman Clock is a noble demon, he has his own code of honor and respect for freedom. He has a wild nature and devilish charisma radiating a certain superiority and greatness in everything. Don't try to expect compassion from him, he is provocative and cruel. But on the other hand his personality is more pleasant than that of first sight. The affable evil lord of the House of Darkness and self-proclaimed «bad guy». He makes friends with Kotaro pretty much the first time they meet, and is one of the most powerful vampires alive, helping to suppress the wave of Kowloon Child infection. He doesn't share the worldview and arrogance of his subordinate August.
He is one of the leaders holding territories in the Special area and he controls the so-called group «The Coven». In spite of young appearance he is oldest alive vampire whom everyone must respect. He travels around the world but now lives in the Special area. This place surprises him because people and vampires live together, this fact is pleasant to him.
He is not only a descendant of Asura, but also possessor of "divine fire". He can use "Eye Ignite" that helps to create a flame in sight. He is a perfect warrior, strategist and he boast unspeakable power for long and short distance battles. He is enthusiastic about combating and despite his versatile behavior, he is a regular guy.
Cain Warlock
Voiced by: Hiroki Yasumoto (Japanese); Christopher Sabat (English)
An Old Blood who works alongside the Company within the Special Zone. Cain is a very strong vampire who has the ability to change into a blue wolf. He is known as a hero of the Kowloon Shock, Retainer of the Warlock family, the Knight of King Azami, and Cain the Blue Wolf. Cain is of the same bloodline as Cassandra and had served the Warlock family before her betrayal. He was also one of Alice's guardians before she died at the hands of Cassandra. He is now a loyal servant to Sei and head of the Marine Bank in the Special Zone. While Cain uses every chance to disrespect Jiro, he thinks highly of Jiro's powers and skills despite believing Jiro to be immature. Cain is a powerful sorcerer who seems to be some sort of werewolf; as he is depicted as a blue wolf in a flash back & during his fight with Yafuri Chao he exhibited a partial transformation which allowed him to easy beat Yafuri into submission.
Dark Princess of the North
Sei's older sister whom Sei greatly respects. Kotaro commented that both she and Sei do not like to talk much-(mostly his sister). The Princess has lived for a very long time and is also a descendant of the chaotic bloodline. She resides in the Sacred Precinct with Crow-(also known as "The Sanctuary"), where Jiro and Kotaro previously stayed at when Kotaro was just a baby. She was sad to see him go, so Kotaro consoled her by saying he will write letters to her when he reaches the Special Zone. Despite her quiet demeanor, she apparently has a short temper and while she enjoys Kotaro's company, if Kotaro does something that angers her-(such as when he accidentally sneezed on the scarf that she had made for him), the Dark Princess does not hesitate to hurt him. Her powers are great enough to warp and change the weather surrounding her.
Crow/Kuro
Voiced by: Akimitsu Takase (Japanese); Brandon Potter (English)
Little is seen of this vampire. He is very skilled with a sword and refers to Jiro as his pupil. He is also a guardian of the Dark Princess of the North.
Zhang Lei Kao
Voiced by: Mugihito (Japanese); R Bruce Elliott (English)
Also known as Pile Killer Zhang or Chief Zhang. He used to be a vampire hunter, and is now a close ally of Sei. He now works for the president of the Order Coffin Company and is also considered to be one of the leaders in the Special Zone. He mentioned that it is an unwritten rule that the bloodline of the sage should not be messed with. Despite his old age, Zhang still holds enough power to kill a Kowloon child with nothing more than a wooden spike.

From L to R: Johan Tsang, Chan, and Kelly Wong

Kelly Wong
Voiced by: Mami Kosuge (Japanese); Monica Rial (English)
A vampire that tries to enter the Special Zone. She and a group of vampires tried to enter the Special Zone in hope of a better life. However, she is the only one in the group to successfully enter the Special Zone in the end, though deeply traumatized by the loss of all her friends and her surrogate daughter. After the Kowloon children start attacking the Special Zone, Kelly aids the residents in defense of the area.
Chan
Voiced by: Ayumi Tsuji (Japanese); Cherami Leigh (English)
A vampire girl that was born from the blood of Kelly Wong. Chan's mother begged Kelly to give Chan some of her blood so Chan could live because at the time Chan was very ill. Later Chan was bitten by a Kowloon child and controlled by Johan Tsang. In the end, Chan was killed by Kelly in order to stop her from being under Johan's control, as Chan was stopping Jiro from saving Kotaro, and she died in Kelly's arms.
Johan Tsang
Voiced by: Kyousei Tsukui (Japanese); Kent Williams (English)
A Kowloon child that hid his identity while staying with Kelly Wong's group. He later took control of most of the group members by sucking their blood and making them obey his command. He is killed by Jiro before he had a chance to enter the Special Zone.
Shougo Jinnai
Voiced by: Ken Narita (Japanese); Daniel Penz (English)
Shougo is Mimiko's boss and the head of the Compromisers team. He reports to the president of the Order Coffin Company and is also considered to be one of the leaders in the Special Zone. Like Zhang, he is a close ally of Sei.
Hibari Kusunogi
Voiced by: Mikako Takahashi (Japanese); Kate Oxley (English)
Mimiko's junior Compromiser. She likes gossip and often gets carried away with her speculations.
Badrick Serihan
Voiced by: Hisao Egawa (Japanese); Travis Willingham (English)
Head of the Order Coffin Company's Suppression Team. He is a strict man with a powerful build and absolute devotion to keeping the Special Zone safe. He is injured when Johan Tsang tries to enter the Special Zone, but still forces himself to fight overwhelming odds during the Kowloon attack despite only being able to use one arm.
Rinsuke Akai
Voiced by: Yasuhiro Takato (Japanese); Chris Cason (English)
A member of the Order Coffin Company. A happy-go-lucky friend of Jiro, Akai is the one to let Jiro off when he is caught by the Suppression Team. He is also the one who made arrangements for the ship which Jiro and Kotaro are seen traveling in at the beginning of the series.
Yafuri Chao
Voiced by: Motoko Kumai (Japanese); Brina Palencia (English)
A direct descendant of the Kowloon King of 10 years and is known as Cassa's "younger brother". He is extremely hot-headed and loves to fight. Despite his adolescent appearance, he is well versed in swordsmanship, martial arts, and vampiric power. He tends to act mainly on his own ambitions aside from his orders. His ambitions consist mainly of challenging strong foes, with the assumption that he will always win. He is easily antagonized, especially if he feels that he is not being taken seriously. He harbors a strong jealousy towards Jiro, although he angrily denies it. He is nearly beat to death by Cain, and is sliced into death by Jiro in the end.
Sayuka Shiramine
Voiced by: Kumi Sakuma (Japanese); Cynthia Cranz (English)
Zelman's personal assistant. She is a human who is also willing to let Zelman suck her blood.
Zaza
Voiced by: Kousuke Toriumi (Japanese); Todd Haberkorn (English)
Also known as "Walkerman" or "The Other" for his unique abilities to possess the body of others. He is Cassa's human brother who invited her into the Special Zone. While Zaza possesses someone, his human form is rendered asleep and is the subject of much humiliation by the cruel Cassa. He is impaled through the abdomen by Jiro's silver katana during the last battle of the Special Zone.
Mitaki Onezaki
Voiced by: Takashi Matsuyama (Japanese); Mark Stoddard (English)
The man who heads the Order Coffin Company. He was one of the few human heroes of Hong Kong and had created the Special Zone in the aftermath to hide the Kowloon King's ashes. He grew up in the Special Zone and transformed the area from slums to a metropolis in only 10 years. However, he has gotten too old to fight with Jiro on the front lines and thus must sit and manage situations rather than be directly involved. He refused to leave the Special Zone when it was under attack.

=== Source Blood ===
Alice Eve (アリス·イヴ, Arisu Ivu)
Voiced by: Omi Minami (Japanese); Leah Clark (English)
An old blood vampire whose bloodline was of the highest rank. She is the oldest vampire of the black bloods. Alice was considered the Mother of Darkness and the founder of the chaotic bloodline. Also known as the Sage. The bloodline of the sage is referred to as the bloodline that transcends death. She fell in love with Jiro during the 19th century and turned him into a vampire when he was on the verge of death. Sadly, she was killed during the Kowloon Shock by the hands of her best friend, Cassandra, but was shortly reincarnated as a newborn baby named Kotaro after her body turned into ashes.
Adam Wong (アダム·王, Adamu Won)
Better known as the King of Kowloon, and known as "father" to the Kowloon Children. Adam is the Source Blood of the youngest bloodline of black bloods, the Kowloon Children. He is responsible for the Kowloon Shock and the Hong Kong Crusade. During the crusade he was defeated by Jiro Mochizuki, but presumably immortal, his ashes are sealed in Eleventh Yard and are highly sought after by his children.

== Media ==
=== Novels ===
No.	Title	Release date	ISBN
1	BLACK BLOOD BROTHERS -Burakku Buraddo Burazāzu Kyōdai Jōriku- (BLACK BLOOD BROTHERS -ブラック・ブラッド・ブラザーズ 兄弟上陸-)	25 July 2004	4-8291-1629-3
2	BLACK BLOOD BROTHERS 2 - Burakku Buraddo Burazāzu Tokku Meidō - (BLACK BLOOD BROTHERS2 -ブラック・ブラッド・ブラザーズ 特区鳴動-)	25 December 2004	4-8291-1671-4
3	BLACK BLOOD BROTHERS 3 -Burakku Buraddo Burazāzu Tokku Shinkan- (BLACK BLOOD BROTHERS3 -ブラック・ブラッド・ブラザーズ 特区震撼-)	25 March 2005	4-8291-1692-7
4	BLACK BLOOD BROTHERS 4 -Burakku Buraddo Burazāzu Rondon Bugyoku- (BLACK BLOOD BROTHERS4 -ブラック・ブラッド・ブラザーズ 倫敦舞曲-)	25 November 2005	4-8291-1775-3
5	BLACK BLOOD BROTHERS 5 - Burakku Buraddo Burazāzu Fūun Kyūkoku- (BLACK BLOOD BROTHERS5 -ブラック・ブラッド・ブラザーズ 風雲急告-)	25 February 2006	4-8291-1795-8
6	BLACK BLOOD BROTHERS 6 -Burakku Buraddo Burazāzu Kyūga Shūketsu- (BLACK BLOOD BROTHERS6 -ブラック・ブラッド・ブラザーズ 九牙集結-)	25 September 2006	4-8291-1860-1
7	BLACK BLOOD BROTHERS 7 -Burakku Buraddo Burazāzu Ōga Sairin- (BLACK BLOOD BROTHERS7 -ブラック・ブラッド・ブラザーズ 王牙再臨-)	25 April 2007	978-4-8291-1921-1
8	BLACK BLOOD BROTHERS 8 -Burakku Buraddo Burazāzu Sensen Renka- (BLACK BLOOD BROTHERS8 -ブラック・ブラッド・ブラザーズ 宣戦恋歌-)	25 October 2007	978-4-8291-1968-6
9	BLACK BLOOD BROTHERS 9 -Burakku Buraddo Burazāzu Kokuja Sekkin- (BLACK BLOOD BROTHERS9 -ブラック・ブラッド・ブラザーズ 黒蛇接近-)	25 June 2008	978-4-8291-3299-9
10	BLACK BLOOD BROTHERS10 -Burakku Buraddo Burazāzu Gintō Shutsujin- (BLACK BLOOD BROTHERS10 -ブラック・ブラッド・ブラザーズ 銀刀出陣-)	25 April 2009	978-4-8291-3389-7
11	BLACK BLOOD BROTHERS11 -Burakku Buraddo Burazāzu Kenja Tensei- (BLACK BLOOD BROTHERS11 -ブラック・ブラッド・ブラザーズ 賢者転生-)	25 May 2009	978-4-8291-3403-0

- Short Stories

No.	Japanese release date	Japanese ISBN
1	July 25, 2005	4-8291-1734-6
2	June 25, 2006	4-8291-1833-4
3	December 25, 2006	4-8291-1881-4
4	July 25, 2007	4-8291-1881-4
5	February 25, 2008	978-4-8291-3254-8
6	October 25, 2008	978-4-8291-3342-2

==== Other ====
- Azano Kohei (author) and Kusakawa Yuya (illustrator) "Black Blood Brothers Beginning Bible-", Fujimi Shobo <Monthly Dragon Magazine June 2006 issue supplement> - Prototype of the work is published.
- Manual Book of the Series

No.	Title	Release date	ISBN
1	Burakku Buraddo Burazāzu Manyuaru Bang-up Background Book (ブラック・ブラッド・ブラザーズ マニュアル Bang－up Background Book)	January 31, 2007 (published January 30)	978-4-8291-7628-3
A supplemental background book (manual) for the Black Blood Brothers series, based on the original work by Azano Kohei and edited by the Dragon Magazine Editorial Department. Published by Fujimi Shobo under the Dragon Magazine Collection SP imprint.

=== Anime ===
Black Blood Brothers has a total of 12 episodes, with the first episode airing on September 8, 2006, and the last on November 24, 2006. The series made its North American television debut when it aired on FUNimation Channel starting May 2, 2009, and it began airing on Chiller's Anime Wednesdays block on July 15, 2015. Chiller abruptly ended its "Anime Wednesday" block. Two pieces of theme music are used for the episodes: one opening theme and one ending theme. The opening theme used is "Ashita no Kioku" (明日の記憶) by Naozumi Takahashi while the ending theme is "Shin'giru" (蜃気楼; / 신기루) by Loveholic.

No.	Title	Original release date
1	"Black Blood Brothers" "Kuroki chi no kyōdai" (Japanese: 黒き血の兄弟)	8 September 2006
Ten years after the Kowloon Shock, Jiro Mochizuki and his little brother, Kotaro, return to Japan so they can go to the Special Zone. Inside the ship, Kotaro sneaks out, despite the fact that Jiro told him not to. He then meets a girl named Chan. Chan promises to keep their encounter a secret. On the ship, Kotaro is caught in the middle of a fight between the Special Zone Suppression Team and a group of refugees. Jiro is awakened by the fighting and punishes Kotaro for disobeying him. Jiro asks why is everyone fighting. The leader of the refugees introduces herself as Kelly Wong. She accuses The Suppression Team for being nothing but homicidal maniacs. The Suppression Team then explain that they won't allow Jiro, Kelly, and the refugees to enter the Special Zone illegally. However, if they have permission from the owners of the Special Zone then the Special Zone, they will be accepted. Jiro confirms that he is unfamiliar with the concept. The Suppression Team attack Jiro, but Jiro uses Hide-Hand to defend himself During the fight, the ship's deck explodes. As a result, Kotaro falls into the ocean and Jiro jumps in to save him. Kelly and the rest of the refugees escape through a small boat. Meanwhile, Mimiko Katsuragi, a Compromiser from the Company, receives a call from Jinnai.
2	"Compromiser" "Conpuromaizā" (Japanese: 調停員(コンプロマイザー))	15 September 2006
Mimiko is dispatched to a beach to investigate. There, Jiro and Kotaro are washed up into a beach where they are saved by Mimiko. Mimiko agrees to show them how to reach the Special Zone. They are approached by Kelly Wong and Johan Tsang, the two vampires from before. They want Jiro to aid them while the Suppression team set out to destroy them. Kelly is shot in the arm, so Johan helps her escape. Jiro plays decoy with the Suppression team so that Kotaro can escape. Kotaro makes it out safely, but Jiro is captured by the Suppression team.
3	"THE KOWLOON BLOODLINE" "Kūron chairudo" (Japanese: 九龍の血統(クーロンチャイルド))	22 September 2006
Kotaro meets up with Johan. Johan tells Kotaro to come with him and Kelly so that they can help him find Jiro. Mimiko arrives and comes along worth them. Jiro is questioned by the head of the Suppression team, Badrick. Badrick explains that one of the refugees may be a Kowloon Child. For that reason, the Suppression Team must exterminate them all. At Chinatown, Kotaro and Chan are playing with paper airplanes. Kelly explains to Mimiko that if she would have let him drink her blood, Jiro would've easily escaped the Suppression team earlier. Mimiko explains to Kelly that Kowloon children can turn people just by drinking their blood and can even turn other vampires. Kelly explains that Kowloon Children are similar to all other vampires because they are all seen as monsters. Mimiko then explains that Kowloon Children kill the people they feed on. Thus, Kowloon Children are nothing like other vampires. Chan appears before Kotaro as a Kowloon Child. Meanwhile, Rinsuke releases Jiro. Back at Chinatown, the Suppression Team once again attack the refugees. It is then revealed that Johan is the kowloon child and has infected the remaining refugees. Jiro, finding out, goes to save Kotaro and Mimiko who are with them. Kotaro is kidnapped by Johan, along with Chan, and Kelly's friends, who became Kowloon children.
4	"Old Blood" "Ōrudo buraddo" (Japanese: 古血(オールド·ブラッド))	29 September 2006
Jiro is weakened after everything that happened. Despite this, Jiro still wants to save his brother. Mimiko tries to convince him not to. So she decides to let him drink her blood. After drinking Mimiko's blood, Jiro recovers his strength. Badrick gives Kelly permission to enter the Special Zone. Jiro sets out to save Kotaro. Jiro defeats Johan's allies and arrives at the twilight bridge, where Johan is trying to enter the Special Zone. Jiro uses Hide-Hand to shake the entire bridge which causes Johan to drop his guard, but Chan protects Johan. Kelly then shoots Chan in the neck, killing her. Johan tries to kill Kotaro, but Jiro kills him. In the end, Jiro and Kotaro are invited by Mimiko to come stay with her in the Special Zone. Jinnai is notified of the situation regarding Jiro. Mimiko invites Jiro and Kotaro to spend the night with her.
5	"Special Zone" "Tokku" (Japanese: 経済特別解放区(トック))	6 October 2006
Mimiko helps Jiro and Kotaro look for a place to live in. Hibari, another Compromiser from the Company, discovers that Mimiko is traveling with the Silver Blade. The Company discuss the issue of having Jiro in the Special Zone while a vampire named Zelman sets out to meet him. Jiro, Mimiko, and Kotaro are attacked by the Coven and their leader, August.
6	"Coven" "Kavun" (Japanese: 夜会(カヴン))	13 October 2006
After defeating their attackers, Jiro and company go to meet Zelman. After meeting Zelman, the group bump into Rinsuke, Sei, and Kain and they have a picnic. Kain explains that both he and Sei can't allow Jiro to stay in the Special Zone. On the way home, they are attacked by the Coven once again. As an act of revenge, August bombs Mimiko's apartment.
7	"Silver Blade" "Gintō" (Japanese: 銀刀)	20 October 2006
Jiro, Mimikko and Kotaro are standing in front of Mimiko's burning apartment. Jiro was extremely agitated that August went on to Blew up Mimiko's place. Mimiko said that it's okay and that their new plan is to go to the office of the Order Coffin Company to make sure that Jiro and Kotaro can stay safe in the Special Zone. Elsewhere, Zaza is seen on a boat at the river. He suddenly notices that Yafuri sneaked out. To make matters worse, he receives a call from Cassandra. Upon reaching the office, all the leader of the 3 Bloodlines in the special zone came together with a former vampire hunter, Jinnai, Kain and the president of OCC. Mimiko speaks to them regarding Jiro's situation while the brothers wait outside the room. Kain decides that August must be punished by his action and that no one else mus take his place after he's gone. Meanwhile, Sayuka was seen with several men, one of which was trying to carry a seemed to be lifeless body. However, as one of them started carrying the dead guy, he suddenly woke up and bit the guy carrying him. The other quickly threw him to the ground and started kicking him until he turns to dust. They were all shocked by what happened but only after a few seconds, the guy who was bitten seemed to have transformed and started biting and killing the other men. Back at the meeting, Kain made it clear that he and Sei are not gonna let Jiro stay in the Special Zone since he only brings trouble. However, Zelman said that if no one is willing to accept Jiro into their place he will. Kain again expressed his concern with his decision. Shortly after, Kotaro was heard talking to the guard outside looking for Mimiko. Kain allowed Kotaro to come to the room. Kotaro came bursting into the room and informed Mimiko that Jiro has left the building and told Kotaro that he will teach someone a lesson. Kotaro said that he was smiling but the look in his eyes is very scary and that he was worried. Kain immediately ordered to call the Suppression Team of the company to stop Jiro. Mimiko made her objection about the matter but Kain explained that no red blood can know that old bloods are fighting as this may result in bigger conflicts. Jinnai then talks to Mimiko who was crying and gave her a mission: to find Jiro and make sure no commotion happens since that is the job of a compromiser. After Mimiko and Kotaro left, Jinnai changes the subject of the meeting from Jiro to the Kowloon Children. Sei was asked if there was a way to detect if a Kowloon Child enter the Special Zone. He said the barrier he built was not made to detect them. Zelman commented that the Special Zone will act as a prison to any Kowloon Child who entered since it is technically impossible to get out as the barrier is controlled by Sei. Back in the office, Zelman receives a call from Sayuka. Zelman then puts his phone on speakers and lets the others listen to Sayuka. Sayuka explains exactly what happened and confirms that the first guy was bitten by August. Kain then orders to have the Suppression Team change their gear to the one specifically manufactured for fighting the Kowloon Children. Jiro is now seen attacking the mansion, impaling every vampire that stands in his way. As Mimiko and Kotaro arrived at the mansion, Jiro was seen standing in front of the door waiting for them. Mimiko immediately threw fits at Jiro saying that what he did will compromise his situation at the Special Zone. Jiro said that he just wants the others to know what will happen to them if they mess with him. Mimiko again promised that they will stay in Special Zone but Jiro wants to leave. He said that that is that only way for Mimiko to be safe but Mimiko objected. Mimiko was then attacked by August who is now a Kowloon Child. However, she was saved by Jiro and they started to fight. Jiro asked him who bit him to become what he is. August said he wasn't bitten but instead drank the blood of a Kowloon Child. Jiro defeats August when two other Coven vampires attacked both him and Mimiko and Kotaro. Jiro saved himself but did not have time to save Mimiko and Kotaro. Fortunately, they were saved by Yafuri. Although he save the two, Jiro quickly went in between them and confirmed with Yafuri that he is a direct descendant of the Kowloon King. Yafuri informed Jiro that he was turned into Kowloon Child before Jiro defeated the Kowloon King. Yafuri also told Jiro that in the past 10 years, his sister Cassa has said nothing but she wants to see Jiro again. Jiro was deeply upset.
8	"Protector" "Goeisha" (Japanese: 護衛者)	27 October 2006
Jiro fights Yafuri, but Yafuri seems to have the advantage. Their battle is interrupted by the arrival of the suppression team. Jiro leaves Mimiko. The Company discuss how they will handle the case of Kowloon contamination in the Special Zone. Kain explains his history with Cassandra Jill Warlock, explaining that she may be involved. Zaza tells Yafuri that he shouldn't confront the Silver Blade by himself, but Yafuri ignores his warnings. Kotaro leaves Jiro so he can say good-bye to Mimiko. Mimiko wakes up in a hotel where she meets Hibari and Kelly. Kelly encourages Mimiko to find Jiro. Kain explains to Jiro that Cassa and the Kowloon children aren't after him or his brother.
9	"Eleventh Yard" "Irebun yādo" (Japanese: 第十一地区(イレブン·ヤード))	3 November 2006
Mimiko and Kelly try to look for Jiro. Kotaro is rescued by Zelman. Kotaro continues to look for Mimiko. Zelman joins him. The Suppression team discover a bunch of vampire bodies. Rinsuke tells Jiro that he'll help him find Kotaro, but he wants Jiro to find Mimiko so that he can apologize to her. Kain battles Yafuri. Kain is badly injured, but is able to defeat Yafuri by turning to Kain the blue wolf. Mimiko and Kelly discover illegal inventory of vampire blood. Also, Mimiko learns a dark secret about Kelly.
10	"Order Coffin Company" "Ōdā Kofin Kanpanī" (Japanese: オーダー·コフィン·カンパニー)	10 November 2006
The false Kelly Wong is actually Cassa, who is holding Mimiko captive so that she can see Jiro again. Rinsuke become unconscious due to hypnotic suggestion by Kain. As Cassa prepares to turn Mimiko into a Kowloon child, Kotaro and Zelman comes to her rescue. Hibari tells Jiro where he can find her. After her fight with Zelman, Cassa decides to leave, but not before giving a message about the Coven. The Company discover that the vampires that the Suppression team rescued in the previous episode are actually Kowloon children as they start infecting others with their blood. Jinnai learns that it was because of the blood packs that Mimiko discovered. Sei is confronted by Zaza, who tells him that if he doesn't tell him the location of the Eleventh Yard, he will destroy the OCC building with a hidden bomb. Before he could, he was impaled by Zhang. Zaza then steals a body of one of the Suppression team members, then helps Yafuri escape.
11	"The Ocean" "Umi" (Japanese: 海)	17 November 2006
The Special Zone is plunging into disaster. Kain discovers that Yafuri has escaped. Sei sets out to end the outbreak of Kowloon children. Yafuri and Zaza start searching for Cassa, but are attacked by Kain. The Suppression team are having trouble maintaining the outbreak, but are rescued by Sei. Zelman is seen killing members of the Coven, because they're Kowloon children. Meanwhile, Kotaro convinces Mimiko to talk to Jiro so that they can live in the Special Zone. Jiro finds Kotaro, but he still wants to leave the Special Zone. Kain is catching up with Yafuri and Zaza, but is stopped by Cassa. After a long conversation with Jiro, Mimiko is finally able to convince him to stay with her. Shortly after, Zaza appears as a Kowloon child and shoots Jiro multiple times with a gun. Jiro falls into the river, with Zaza jumping in and stabbing Jiro multiple times. Mimiko jumps in an attempt to save Jiro's life.
12	"For the Eternal Pulse of Mine Bloodline, I Would Offer This Blood in Totality" "Waga kettō no eien naru kodō ga tame kono chi no subete o sasagen koto o" (Japanese: 我が血統の永遠なる鼓動がためこの血の総てを捧げんことを)	24 November 2006
Jiro stops Zaza from killing Mimiko, but he is severely injured. Mimiko, however, allows him to drink her blood. Now fully healed, Jiro defeats Zaza and heads toward his final battle with Cassa. Sei clears the way for Jiro so he can get there faster. On the way, Jiro explains that he and Kotaro came to the Special Zone so that Kotaro can make new friends. Jiro doesn't want Kotaro to be alone when he's not around anymore. The vampire that turned Jiro was Alice Eve, the Sage. She was a source blood, and one of the most ancient black bloods. She never wanted to share her blood with anyone, except for Jiro, who is the only person she shared her blood with. As her protector, it's Jiro's responsibility to keep her body and her blood safe. Unfortunately, she was killed in Hong Kong, but was reborn as a child: Kotaro. Once Kotaro fully matures, Jiro will return Alice's blood to her. Afterwards, he will live on through her. Jiro concludes his explanation saying that this is what it means to be a vampire, that it's their destiny to sacrifice anything for the sake of their bloodline. Jiro finally catches up with Cassa, and they both have their final battle. Kain confronts Yafuri, but is defeated. Zelman uses eye ignite to slow down Zaza and Yafuri, but when he notices that they made it through, he lets them escape. Yafuri notices that Cassa is having trouble with her fight with Jiro. He tries to help, but Jiro kills him. Jiro prepares to finish off Cassa, but it starts raining, which makes him weak. However, he overcomes this weakness and charges towards Cassa. Zaza tries to stop Jiro, but Jiro kills him. Jiro and Cassa both impale each other, but they both survive. Cassa escapes the Special Zone. Sei closes the barrier so that no more Kowloon children can enter the Special Zone. Peace has finally returned to the Special Zone. Mimiko wakes up in a hotel, where Kotaro gives her money for rent. Meanwhile, Jinnai explains to Jiro that it wasn't August who bombed Mimiko's apartment (see episode 6). The bomb was placed by his command. It was so that Jiro would stay in the Special Zone. Jinnai tells Jiro that there's an old building that the Company once use as a warehouse. It's really old, but more than big enough for three people. Jiro asks Jinnai about the Eleventh Yard. Jinnai said that the Eleventh Yard contains ashes of the Kowloon king. Cassa and the Kowloon children came to the Special Zone to retrieve the ashes. They wanted to resurrect him. Jinnai explains to Jiro that he is the Special Zone's only chance of survival because Jiro killed the Kowloon king in the past. Jinnai concludes by saying that he is no longer capable of fighting alongside Jiro, so he must protect the special Zone, Mimiko, and Kotaro (aka the Lord Sage, as Jinnai calls him) alone. The next day, Jiro tells Mimiko that she can't tell Kotaro what Jiro told her yesterday. Mimiko, Jiro, and Kotaro receive their first assignment and head straight for work. Mimiko notices the look on Jiro's face, but believes everything will work out.

=== Manga ===
No.	Title	Japanese release date	Japanese ISBN
1 (Anthology)	"BBB" Kōshiki Komikku Ansorojī BLACK BLOOD BROTHERS Ver. C (『BBB』公式コミックアンソロジー BLACK BLOOD BROTHERS Ver. C)	January 30, 2007	978-4-04-712479-0
An official comic anthology based on the Black Blood Brothers series, featuring work by Fujino Akia, Yonekura Satoru, Nekotama, and illustrated by Hasumi Momoi, based on the original work by Azano Kohei. Published by Fujimi Shobo under the Kadokawa Comics Dragon Jr. imprint.

== See also ==
- List of fantasy anime
- List of programs broadcast by Chiller
