= List of programs broadcast by Chiller =

This is a list of shows that have been broadcast on the former channel Chiller.

== Original ==
- AHHH Zombies
- Can You Survive a Horror Movie?
- Real Fear: The Truth Behind the Movies
- Scare Tactics
- Slasher

== Specials ==
- Chiller 13: The Decade's Scariest Movie Moments
- Chiller 13: Great American Slashers
- Chiller 13: Horror's Creepiest Kids
- Chiller 13: Most Horrifying Hook-Ups

== Acquired ==
- 13: Fear Is Real (2010-12)
- 666 Park Avenue (2015-2017)
- Alfred Hitchcock Presents (2007-2010)
- All Souls
- American Gothic
- The American Scream
- Apparitions
- Beauty and the Beast (2006-2009)
- Being Human
- Beyond Belief: Fact or Fiction (2010-2014)
- Black Blood Brothers
- Brimstone
- Buffy the Vampire Slayer (2010-2012)
- Children of Darkness
- Dark Realm
- Dark Shadows (1991)
- Dead Like Me
- Descendants of Darkness
- Devil May Cry: The Animated Series
- Fear Factor (2009-2015)
- Forever Knight
- Freakylinks
- Freddy's Nightmares (2007-2009)
- Friday the 13th: The Series (2006-2010)
- The Future of Fear
- The Gates
- Ghost Hunters
- Ghost Whisperer (2011-2015)
- Ghoul
- Good vs Evil
- Harper's Island
- Haunted (2007-2011)
- Haven (2013-2016)
- Hex
- The Hunger
- Invasion (2009-2011)
- Is This a Zombie?
- Kindred: The Embraced
- Kolchak: The Night Stalker
- Lost Girl
- Masters of Horror (2008-2011)
- Millennium (2007-2010)
- Monster
- Monsters
- Most Daring (2007-2011)
- The New Alfred Hitchcock Presents
- Night Gallery
- Night Stalker
- Night Visions
- Nightmare Cafe
- The Nightmare Room
- The Others
- The Outer Limits (1963)
- The Outer Limits (1995)
- Persons Unknown
- Poltergeist: The Legacy
- Profit
- Pushing Daisies (2012-2015)
- Ripley's Believe It or Not! (2009-2014)
- Sanctuary
- Scary... But True!
- Sea of Souls
- The Secret Circle (2013-2017)
- The Sixth Sense
- Spine Chillers
- Strange
- Strange World
- Tales from the Crypt (2006-2011)
- Tales from the Darkside (2007-2015)
- Todd and the Book of Pure Evil
- Tokko
- Tokyo Majin
- Tru Calling
- The Twilight Zone (1959–1964)
- The Twilight Zone (1985–1989)
- Twin Peaks
- Unexplained Mysteries
- War of the Worlds
- Werewolf (2007-2009)
- Wolf Lake (2008-2012)
- World's Most Amazing Videos (2009-2013)
- The X-Files (2009-2016)
