= The Dreamers (novel series) =

Novel series by David and Leigh Eddings

The Dreamers is the title of a fantasy book series by American writer David Eddings and his wife Leigh Eddings. The story revolves around four beings known as The Elder Gods residing in the land of Dhrall: Dahlaine of the North, Veltan of the South, Zelana of the West and Aracia of the East. They must recruit the help of outlanders to destroy the fiendish Vlagh and prevent its attempt at world conquest. The Elder Gods are not permitted to use their powers to kill, but the young Dreamers can use their dreams to predict and affect the future.

The series includes four titles:

1. The Elder Gods (2003)
2. The Treasured One (2004)
3. Crystal Gorge (2005)
4. The Younger Gods (2006)

== Plot summary ==
=== The Elder Gods ===
The Elder Gods
- Cover
- Author: David and Leigh Eddings
- Cover artist: Matt Stawicki
- Language: English
- Series: The Dreamers
- Genre: Fantasy
- Publisher: Warner Books
- Publication date: October 14, 2003
- Publication place: United States
- Media type: Print (hardback & paperback)
- Pages: 404 (hardback)
- ISBN: 0-446-61333-9
- OCLC: 56560293
- LC Class: CPB Box no. 2326 vol. 3
- Preceded by: none
- Followed by: The Treasured One

The first volume of the series, The Elder Gods, is about the invasion of the unsuspecting Zelana's Domain by the hordes of the Vlagh inhabiting the Wasteland center of the Land of Dhrall.

The Elder Gods are each given an infant told to be a Dreamer and are supposed to save the world and defeat the Vlagh. When Eleria, Zelana's child, has the first dream, the Elder Gods go out in search of mercenaries to hire with gold (found useless and common in the land of Dhrall).

Zelana takes to the west of Dhrall to the land of Maag where she forces a storm to bring the ship and crew of Sorgan Hook-Beak to her domain. Hook-Beak is shown that she will pay a large quantity of gold to hire an army from Maag and fight a war. He takes the native archers Longbow and Red-Beard as well as Zelana with her child Eleria to Maag in search of more crews. They find much success but when the Vlagh sends an agent out to convince a crew to destroy Sorgan Hook-Beak and steal the gold, they are stopped thanks to a vision of Eleria. The night they came to attack, Longbow and the small Maag smith of Hook-Beak's crew, Rabbit, destroy the enemy fleet and the Vlagh agent responsible. A tight friendship is made by Rabbit and Longbow.

Meanwhile, in the Trogite Empire, south of Dhrall, Veltan has managed to hire a retired army general, Narasan, and his companions Padan, Gunda, Keselo and Jalkan.

The two armies meet in the western domain in surprise due to their extreme dislike for one another but Hook-Beak and Narasan become friends quickly as they plan to stop the foreseen attack in the Ravine above the Dhrall village of Lattash, the home of Red-Beard. Yaltar, the Dreamer of Veltan, foresees that the Vlagh would attack there and that there would be much killing on both sides. As the armies of Maag and the Trogite Empire build their barricades and planned their assault after the warm ocean air, created by Eleria, melts the snow where the Vlagh's servants are waiting, thus creating flooding and winning most of the war then. While Eleria dreams up the flood, Rabbit and Kesselo are informed about the true nature of the gods, and what they really are, and told to keep it a secret from the other outlanders.

Sure enough, Eleria's dream brings forth an extremely warm wind and many servants die in the flood. The native archers dip the arrows in the venom of the dead servants washed down to Lattash to ensure their victory, but the venom was also used with spears and wooden stakes. The remaining creatures of the Vlagh in the ravine met their ends with their own poison.

After the Vlagh's first wave of minions were obliterated, the outlander armies moved north to the top of the ravine and built a fort to prevent the continuous coming of the servants. However, as the fort was finished and the domain of Zelana was seemingly impregnable, the Vlagh's servants revealed their clever trick. They were using creatures to climb the mountain to the fort as decoys so that the bulk of their army would walk through tunnels in the mountain to end up far down in the ravine. The Vlagh had successfully trapped the outlanders as the earth began to shake. Veltan came and warned the outlanders to reach safe ground as Yaltan was having a dream that was about to unleash a behemoth. The outlanders evacuated as two volcanoes of massive power eradicated the Vlagh's creatures by filling up the tunnels and burrows with molten rock. The war had been won by the outlanders.

Zelana was afraid of the capabilities of the Dreams and fled but when she returned, Lattash had to be moved due to the twin volcanoes and the chief of the people of Lattash passed on his title to Red-Beard as the natives and outlanders pondered the next location of the Vlagh's attack.

=== The Treasured One ===
The Treasured One
- Cover
- Author: David and Leigh Eddings
- Language: English
- Series: The Dreamers
- Genre: Fantasy
- Publisher: HarperCollins
- Publication date: 2004
- Publication place: United States
- Media type: Print
- Pages: 519 (hardback)
- ISBN: 0-446-53226-6
- Preceded by: The Elder Gods
- Followed by: Crystal Gorge

Narasan and Sorgan move their armies to the Domain of Veltan, where they meet Veltan's friend, Omago. Before their arrival, Veltan had given Omago a knife, and Omago figured out how to turn the knife into a spear, a weapon that was common in the outside world, but unknown to the peaceful people of Veltan's domain. Veltan shows the outlanders his house, which they are shocked to discover is made from one stone. They examine a miniature model of the Domain, and begin to make plans. Omago's wife, Ara, enters, announcing supper is ready, and Jalkan, known for his violent and corrupt nature, suggests she take up prostitution, and Omago hits him. Jalkan attempts to retaliate, but Keselo stops him, and Narasan fires him, ordering Padan to chain him up and throw him in the brig of his flagship, the Victory.

Jalkan escapes and returns to The Trogite Empire, where he reconnects with his former friend and partner-in-crime, Adnari Estarg. Adnari maintains a position of power within the corrupt Amarite church, and is interested in the tales Jalkin brings of abundant gold in the land of Dhrall. The church puts together a large expedition intent on plundering Veltan's domain and selling its peaceful citizens into slavery. However, shortly after they arrive on Dhrall, a supernatural being (later revealed to be Omago's wife, Ara) bewitches the Amarite force into believing that the Wasteland of the Vlagh is covered in gold dust. The church's soldiers, forced into a supernatural frenzy, rush towards the Wasteland, leaving their camp unguarded and freeing the natives whom they have enslaved.

Meanwhile, the combined Armies of Narasan, Sorgan, and Red-Beard, along with a group of farmers-turned-soldiers led by Omago face off against the minions of the Vlagh, who have evolved into three new forms. Bat-insect hybrids serve as scouts for the Vlagh, while large snake-men and giant spiders with shells like turtles comprise its combat force. Although they initially appear formidable, these creatures are revealed to be slow and stupid, and are easily held back by the defenders.

Longbow has a dream in which a mysterious woman (again, later revealed to be Ara) encourages him to pull the defending armies back, thereby allowing the Amarite church's expedition to advance towards the Wasteland. Still believing they will find gold, the church army engages the minions of the Vlagh. While they are fighting, one of the dreamers redirects the course of a river, causing it to drown both invading forces.

=== Crystal Gorge ===
Crystal Gorge
- Cover
- Author: David and Leigh Eddings
- Language: English
- Series: The Dreamers
- Genre: Fantasy
- Publisher: HarperCollins
- Publication date: 2005
- Publication place: United States
- Media type: Print (hardback & paperback)
- Pages: 496 pp (first edition, hardback)
- ISBN: 0-446-53227-4 (first edition, hardback)
- Preceded by: The Treasured One
- Followed by: The Younger Gods

The Crystal Gorge is another book by David and Leigh Eddings. Like the Treasured one, it is divided into sections which give background information on a particular character, and summarizes the story from the first book to the present from the character's point of view. After the battle in Veltan's domain, the important characters meet at Veltan's home to discuss their next moves. They agree to separate their forces until one of the children gives them an indication to where the servants of the Vlagh are going to mount their third invasion. Narasan and his Trogite soldiers go to Aracia's domain (who knowing that her domain is defenseless tries to convince Dahlaine that the servants of the Vlagh are going to attack her domain next). In the end, they split up their forces; the Maags go north to Dahlaine's Domain. Rabbit, Longbow, Red-beard and Keselo go with them. Ekial and Veltan go to the land of the Malavi to hire Malavi horse warriors, and then with a little tampering from Veltan get the warriors to Dahlaine's country. They discover that the servants of the Vlagh are stirring up trouble in the numerous clans of Dahlaine's nations. Lillabeth has her dream, which the other Dreamers know about and tell Zelana that Aracia is trying to keep Lillabeth quiet. Zelana goes to intimidate her sister and learn of the dream. The defenders get rid of the insane Atazkan chief and find the source of the plague which is not a plague - it is actually the poison of the servants of the Vlagh. Afterwards, the defenders fortify Crystal Gorge, with the help of the Malavi, the Trogites, and the Maags, the defenders fight back the minions of the Vlagh. Finally, a tornado of fire sweeps through crystal gorge, created by the Dreamers, destroying the servants of the Vlagh.

=== The Younger Gods ===
The Younger Gods
- Cover
- Author: David and Leigh Eddings
- Language: English
- Series: The Dreamers
- Genre: Fantasy
- Publisher: HarperCollins
- Publication date: 2006
- Publication place: United States
- Media type: Print (hardback & paperback)
- Pages: 420 pp (first edition, paperback)
- ISBN: 0-446-61332-0 (first edition, paperback)
- Preceded by: The Crystal Gorge

The end of the 25 eons has arrived. The Elder Gods are getting sleepier and sleepier by the second, but are forced to stay awake and alert as Alcevan, a servant of The Vlagh, convinces Aracia to kill Lillabeth, saying that The 'Wicked Enalla' is trying to usurp Aracia's throne. By killing Lillabeth, Enalla will be prevented from ever taking Aracia's place again. Aracia, in her insanity, tries to kill Lillabeth, but in her madness forgets the most fundamental law that defines the gods of Dhrall: they may not kill. Aracia thus ceases to exist.

Meanwhile, Longbow, Omago and others journey to the Wasteland. Omago uses his newly remembered powers to block the Vlagh from the Overmind and order all the bugs out their nest. The Vlagh comes out, as Aracia's copy, and watches as her bug-servants eat the other bugs until there are no more and the Vlagh is all alone. The Vlagh screams out loud (Omago comments that "It will probably continue on forever"), and Longbow is delighted as he had seen the Vlagh suffer, and says that Misty-Water is now avenged. Screaming in the same cave but a different cavern is the servant who convinced Aracia to attempt to kill Lillabeth. And they shall scream for eternity.

Because of Aracia's disappearance, Eleria is convinced to be Aracia's replacement, since Balacenia and her can no longer merge, as Zelana's hands-off approach to parenting and Eleria's subsequent time being raised by dolphins means they are now too different. Eleria requests that Ara resurrect Longbow's love Misty-Water, who was killed by the Vlagh years before. Ara agrees, and both the Elder and Younger Gods attend the wedding.

The story ends with Zelana and Eleria going to sleep, with Balacenia promising to awaken them when she is ready to sleep again in another 25,000 years.

== See also ==
- List of The Dreamers characters
- David Eddings
