= Ui Miyazaki =

Japanese voice actress and singer

- 宮崎 羽衣
- Born: August 23, 1981 (age 45); Tokyo, Japan
- Occupations: Voice actress; singer
- Years active: 2004–present
- Agent: 81 Produce

Ui Miyazaki (宮崎羽衣, Miyazaki Ui; born August 23, 1981) is a Japanese voice actress and singer. She is an actress, known for Charger Girl Ju-den Chan (2009), Hime-sama Goyojin (2006) and Magician's Academy! (2008).

== Filmography ==
=== Anime ===
- Ar tonelico as Aurica Nestmile
- Chaos;Head as Nanami Nishijō
- Da Capo Second Season as Aisia
- Da Capo III as Charles Yoshino
- Fight Ippatsu! Jūden-chan!! as Hakone Oumi
- Gift ~eternal rainbow~ as Kirino Konosaka
- Himesama Goyōjin as Na-na
- Izumo: Takeki Tsurugi no Senki as Suzaku
- Kamichama Karin as Kazusa
- Magical Kanan as Emi Kojima
- Macademi Wasshoi! as Suzuho Hasegawa
- Night Wizard The ANIMATION as Elis Shihō
- Ray as Aka Ribbon
- Strawberry Panic! as Remon Natsume
- Sumomomo Momomo as Iroha Miyamoto
- Master of Epic: The Animation Age as Waragetcha Black

=== Video games ===
- Ar tonelico as Aurica Nestmile, Hama, Mir
- Ar tonelico II as Jakuri, Aurica Nestmile
- Atelier Rorona: The Alchemist of Arland as Hom (Female)
- Chaos;Head as Nanami Nishijō
- Chaos;Head Love Chu Chu! as Nanami Nishijō
- Cross Edge as Aurica Nestmile
- Mana Khemia: Alchemists of Al-Revis as Anna Lemouri
- Mana Khemia 2: Fall of Alchemy as Puni-Yo
- Memories Off 6: T-wave as Yuno Kasuga
- L@ve once as Nagomi Tachibana
- Sdorica as Yamitsuki, Yamitsuki SP, Yamitsuki MZ

== Music ==
- Kurenai (Night Wizard! Opening)
- Happy Succession
- PHOSPHOR (Kanokon Opening)
- Mamorasete... (Master of Epic: The Animation Age Ending)
- Kizuna no Uta (Tayutama: Kiss on my Deity Ending)
- Kirenai Knife (Remember 11: The Age of Infinity Ending)
