= Magical Kanan =

Japanese adult visual novel

- First North American DVD cover of the OVA series

SeptemCharm まじかるカナン (Seputimu Chāmu Majikaru Kanan)
- Genre: Magical girl; Hentai (OVA series)
- Video game
- Developer: Terios
- Genre: Eroge, Visual novel
- Platform: Windows, DVD
- Released: December 17, 1998
- Original video animation
- Directed by: Yasuhiro Matsumura
- Written by: Hideki Mitsui
- Studio: ARMS
- Licensed by: NA: NuTech Digital (former); Adult Source Media (present)
- Released: August 25, 2000 – February 25, 2003
- Runtime: 30 minutes
- Episodes: 6 (Note: 4 regular episodes + 2 episodes of Palpitating Summer Camp!)
- Anime television series

Magical Canan
- Directed by: Masashi Abe
- Written by: Mitsuhiro Yamada
- Studio: AIC A.S.T.A.
- Licensed by: NA: Discotek Media
- Original network: Tokyo MX
- Original run: January 1, 2005 – March 26, 2005
- Episodes: 13

SeptemCharm: Magical Kanan (Japanese: SeptemCharm まじかるカナン, Hepburn: Seputimu Chāmu Majikaru Kanan) is a Japanese adult visual novel developed and published by Terios. It was later adapted into a hentai OVA series; four episodes were released from August 25, 2000, to November 25, 2001, and two additional episodes, titled Magical Kanan Special: Palpitating Summer Camp! (まじかるカナンSP どきどきサマーキャンプ！, Majikaru Kanan Supesharu Dokidoki Samā Kyanpu), were released from August 25, 2002 to February 25, 2003. A 13-episode anime television series adaptation titled Magical Canan (Japanese: まじかるカナン, Hepburn: Majikaru Kanan), which excluded the pornographic content, was broadcast from January 1 to March 26, 2005.

The OVA series was previously licensed for distribution in North America by NuTech Digital in 2004. Since 2006, the OVA is licensed by Adult Source Media. The anime television series was licensed by Discotek Media in 2017.

== Plot ==
Five dangerous "seeds" have been stolen from their vault in the world of Evergreen and sent to Earth. The magical seeds can bind themselves to humans and prey off their desires, turning them into monsters. Natsuki, an agent of Queen Tsuyuha, is sent to Earth to seek out a Magical Warrior. He and Hiiragi Chihaya, a high school girl, meet, and she transforms into Magical Senshi Carmein. Complications arise with the arrival of the obnoxious Magical Warrior Cerulean Blue, and the mysterious transfer student, Emi Kojima.

== Characters ==
Note that the following descriptions are specific to the anime television series.

Chihaya Hiiragi (柊 ちはや, Hiiragi Chihaya)
Voiced by: Ryou Hirohashi
A high school student who works at Angel Kiss, the restaurant managed by her mother. With the help of Natsuki, she can transform into Magical Warrior Carmein (カーマイン). Carmein is Chihaya's idealized self (a more adult appearance) and she also receives magical powers while in that form.
Natsuki (なつき)
Voiced by: Hisayoshi Suganuma
An animal that appeared at Chihaya's school. He appears to be similar to a rabbit but is an unknown animal and the school nurse wished to dissect him when he was captured. Chihaya rescued him and took him to her house, though problems arose with her parents as animals are not permitted in the restaurant. Natsuki revealed himself to be a person from Evergreen, a magical land. He appears as an animal due to lack of magical energy. Despite his intimacy with Chihaya, their friendship in the OVA is depicted as an uneasy one, which is toned own considerably for the anime version.
Sayaka Mizushiro (水城 さやか, Mizushiro Sayaka)
Voiced by: Nana Mizuki
A very rich girl who is Chihaya's close friend. She can transform into Magical Warrior Cerulean Blue (with the help of her partner Hazuna) and takes the form of her idealized self (being more outspoken). She has a strong bond with Hazuna, so she is very powerful as a Magical Warrior, however, this consumes much of her physical strength, so she is weak in her civilian form.
Hazuna (ハヅナ)
Voiced by: Takahiro Mizushima
Sayaka's partner and an agent of Queen Tsuyuha. Like Natsuki, he has the ability to transform Sayaka into a Magical Warrior. His animal form is similar to a purple ferret (a yellow one in the OVA). He poses as Sayaka's private tutor. He is also Natsuki's brother.
Emi Kojima (小島 えみ, Kojima Emi)
Voiced by: Ui Miyazaki
A girl from Evergreen who transfers to Chihaya's school under the name Emi Kojima. Her real name is Septem. She is in love with Bergamot, but he is only attracted to her because of her resemblance to his wife, Emi Hiiragi. She works with Bergamot to help protect Chihaya from Fennel and Calendula. Though depicted as a heroine in the anime, in the OVA she was depicted as a villainess.
Bergamot (ベルガモット, Berugamotto)
Voiced by: Hideyuki Tanaka
Chihaya's father. Fennel talked him into stealing the seeds from their vault. Even before that, however, he became a fugitive for eloping with the human Emi Hiiragi, who became Chihaya's mother. Eventually he comes to Earth with Septem with the intent of protecting Chihaya from Fennel. While on Earth, he poses as a teacher at Chihaya's school under the name Jounouchi.
Fennel (フェンネル, Fenneru)
Voiced by: Hirotaka Suzuoki
The main antagonist of the series. He is the one behind the seeds coming to Earth. He aims to harness Chihaya/Carmein's power at its peak, infecting her and using it to destroy the world and "purify" it. On Earth he poses as the chairman of Chihaya's school.
Calendula (カレンデュラ, Karendura)
Voiced by: Chiaki Takahashi
Fennel's underling. She is responsible for infecting the individual humans with seeds. Near the end of the series, she is infected with first one, then two seeds to make her stronger, which ends up destroying her.

== Music ==
- Opening theme: "Magical Chodai" by Ui Miyazaki
- Ending theme: "Koi Gokoro" by Ai Tokunaga

== Reception ==
The OVA series released on DVD by NuTech Digital, Inc. was reviewed by Chris Beveridge for the media blog Mania.com. He gave a positive review for Magical Kanan Box Set and gave it an overall grade of "B." He gave a less positive review for the two-episode Magical Kanan Special Box Set and gave it an overall grade of "C."

== See also ==
- Papillon Rose
- UFO Ultramaiden Valkyrie
