= Night Wizard! =

Japanese fantasy role-playing game

- Night Wizard! 2nd ed. cover
- Designers: Takeshi Kikuchi, F.E.A.R.
- Publishers: Enterbrain
- Publication: 2002 (1st edition); 2007 (2nd edition)
- Genres: Contemporary fantasy
- Systems: Compatible with Seven Fortress

Night Wizard! (Japanese: ナイトウィザード, Hepburn: Naito Wizādo) is a Japanese contemporary fantasy role-playing game designed by Takeshi Kikuchi and FarEast Amusement Research (F.E.A.R.) released in 2002. In the modern-day earth campaign setting, player characters called Wizards (ウィザード) fight against the world enemy named Emulators (エミュレーター) and their lords Maō (魔王) and explore the dungeons built by Emulators.

The game's campaign session (played by F.E.A.R.'s staff and voice actors) logs named replays were published in non-RPG magazines such as E-LOGIN and Magi-Cu, therefore, Night Wizard! fans are not limited to only RPG gamers.

An anime television series adaptation animated by Hal Film Maker began airing in Japan in October 2007 and ended its run on December 25, 2007. Night Wizard! actively diversifies into other media contents including replays, drama CD, manga, computer games, and light novels and so on.

== Gameplay ==
The game takes place in an alternate Earth in which the existence of magic is concealed. This Earth is called Far-The-Earth (ファー・ジ・アース) by beings from other worlds, unlike humans from Far-The-Earth who simply call it "Earth". This world is very similar to the Earth humans live on, except for a few differences.

The system of Night Wizard! 2nd edition is fully compatible with the fantasy RPG Seven Fortress Mobius (its 4th edition). The campaign settings of two games are able to be connected, both of Far-the-Earth and Lars Felia, the world of Seven Fortress are ones of the worlds in the same multiverse named Shuhakkai (主八界, which means "main worlds of eight"). Other six worlds in Shuhakkai: El Neysia, El Flare, Elsgoala, Elclam, Elqulia and Rustyarne are also playable by using Seven Fortress's sourcebooks and these campaign settings are also compatible with Night Wizard!. The sourcebooks of Seven Fortress's campaign settings

Unlike most Japanese urban action RPGs, the game focuses on dungeon play. This is because the RPG which the game is based on, Seven Fortress, was also heavily focused on dungeons, but the game is designed so that dungeons can be readied even in a modern-day setting, which is considered the strongpoint of the game to this date.

== Media ==
The rule books and other contents are only released in Japanese language. Translations some of the book titles are noted in brackets.

=== Books ===
  - Night Wizard! ISBN 978-4-7577-0855-6
  - Stardust Memories - Hoshi wo Tsugu Mono (Inheritor of the Stars) ISBN 978-4-7577-1220-1
  - Longinus ISBN 978-4-7577-2231-6
  - Night Wizard! 2nd Edition ISBN 978-4-7577-3758-7
  - School Maze ISBN 978-4-7577-3886-7
  - Labyrinth City ISBN 978-4-7577-4503-2
  - Soul Arts ISBN 978-4-7577-4850-7
  - Far the Earth ISBN 978-4-04-726718-3

=== Books with Drama CDs ===
  - Power of Love ISBN 978-4-7577-2617-8, Guest starring Shuichi Ikeda
  - Reach for the Stars ISBN 978-4-7577-3349-7, Guest starring Kana Ueda, Sayaka Kinoshita and Kaori Nazuka
  - Fly Me to the Moon ISBN 978-4-7577-4048-8, Guest starring Toru Furuya, Kaori Shimizu
  - Operation Chaos ISBN 978-4-7577-4676-3, Guest starring Yukari Tamura, Ui Miyazaki
  - Stardust Tears, ISBN 978-4-7577-5077-7, Guest starring Norio Wakamoto
  - Broom Maiden, ISBN 978-4-04-726424-3, Guest starring Sayuri Yahagi, Jun Fukuyama and Mikako Takahashi
  - The End of Eternity, ISBN 978-4-04-727102-9, Guest starring Tomokazu Sugita, Ryoko Ono and Kaori Nazuka

Opening theme
FLY INTO THE NIGHT by Ema Kogure, composed by Toshimichi Isoe (ZIZZ STUDIO) and lyrics by Ikuko Ebata (ZIZZ STUDIO)
New opening theme
Sabbath by Cyua (BETTA FLASH), composed and lyrics by TAMAYO (BETTA FLASH)
Ending theme
Kaguya (月衣) by Kanako Itō, composed by Toshimichi Isoe (ZIZZ STUDIO) and lyrics by Kanako Itō

- Scenario pack
  - Over Night ISBN 978-4-7577-3640-5

=== Session logs ===
- Replays (Official session-logs)
  - Akaki Tsuki no Miko (Miko of the Red Moon) ISBN 978-4-7577-1637-7
  - Fureisu no Ensai (Fire Fortress of Flayth) #1-#2 ISBN 978-4-7577-1972-9, ISBN 978-4-7577-1973-6
  - Kuroki Hoshi no Miko (Prince of the Black Star) ISBN 978-4-7577-1875-3
  - Shiroki Hi no Miko (Child of the White Sun) ISBN 978-4-7577-2556-0
  - Awase Kagami no Miko (God-child of the Parallel Mirrors) ISBN 978-4-7577-3088-5
  - Ai wa Sadame Sadame wa Shi (Love Is the Plan the Plan Is Death) ISBN 978-4-7577-3923-9
  - Monochrome no Kyōkai (Border of the Monochrome) ISBN 978-4-7577-4772-2
  - Eternal Brave ISBN 978-4-04-726730-5
  - Soukyuu no Engage (Engage of the Blue Sky) ISBN 978-4-04-726825-8

=== Novels ===
  - Aoki Mon no Keisyousya (Successor of the Blue Gate) ISBN 978-4-7577-2035-0
  - Hoshi wo Tsugu Mono (Inheritor of the Stars) ISBN 978-4-7577-3037-3
  - Hiiragi Renji to Hougyoku no Shōjo (Renji Hiiragi and the Girl of the Magic Jewels) #1-#2 ISBN 978-4-7577-3753-2, ISBN 978-4-7577-3861-4
  - Kagami no Meikyū no Grand-guignol (Grand-guignol of the Mirror Labyrinth) ISBN 978-4-7577-3799-0
  - Anthology - Mahōtsukai to Kyūjitsu no Sugoshikata (Wizards and their ways to spend holidays) ISBN 978-4-7577-4289-5
  - Kuraki Meikyū no Burlesque (Burlesque of the Dark Labyrinth) ISBN 978-4-7577-4465-3
  - Anthology - Daimaō wa Sekai-metsubou no Yume wo Miruka? (Does the Demon Lord Dream of World Destroy?)

=== Manga ===
  - Night Wizard Variable Witch #1–#2 ISBN 978-4-7577-3872-0, ISBN 978-4-7577-4390-8

=== Video games ===
- Night Wizard! -The Peace Plan to Save the World- (Windows98/2000/Me/Xp)
- Night Wizard The VIDEO GAME -Denial of the World- (PlayStation 2)

== Anime ==
- Night Wizard
- Night Wizard The Animation logo

ナイトウィザード The ANIMATION (Night Wizard The ANIMATION)
- Genre: Action, drama, supernatural
- Manga

Night Wizard Comic - Variable Witch
- Written by: Takeshi Kikuchi/F.E.A.R.
- Illustrated by: NekoByouNeko
- Published by: Enterbrain
- Magazine: Famitsu Playstation +
- Original run: April 2007 – June 2008
- Volumes: 2
- Anime television series
- Directed by: Yūsuke Yamamoto
- Produced by: Mamoru Minagawa; Naomi Sudō; Kenta Suzuki; Kazuhiro Nunokawa
- Written by: Ayuna Fujisaki
- Music by: Tamayo Kawamoto; Takashi Hamada
- Studio: Hal Film Maker
- Original network: Kids Station, Tokyo MX, Chiba TV, TV Aichi, Television Osaka, Television Saitama
- Original run: October 2, 2007 – December 25, 2007
- Episodes: 13

=== Summary ===
Night Wizard. A term given to those whose mission it is to protect the world from impending darkness. Renji Hiiragi is one such Night Wizard, who is constantly called on missions, even though all he wants is to be able to go to school and graduate. However, his latest order was to protect Elis Shiho, who is a new transfer student at his academy. Being dragged into the Astronomy Club by Renji's childhood friend, Kureha Akabane on her first day at school, Elis soon realizes that she too, has the power to become a night wizard, after retrieving the Jewel of Affection. Along with Renji and Kureha, Elis now begins her fight and her new life, as a Night Wizard, both to collect the six other Jewels and to protect the world from eternal darkness.

=== Characters ===
Main Characters

Renji Hiiragi—The male protagonist and a Night Wizard. Hiiragi is constantly called upon for missions, which leaves him little or no time to go to school and subsequently graduate. Hiiragi is often used in the anime for comical purposes, often being teased about his 'school-life'. After Elis is informed of her mission, Hiiragi is given the task of protecting Elis. He and Kureha live with Elis in order to guard her 24/7, although he has to live out on the balcony. He is also known as the 'Falling Man' in school for hardly ever coming to school and his recent degrade from 3rd year to 2nd year also relies on his nickname. His artifact is a Demon Sword (which seems to be a class of artifacts) with several different attacks. His personality is aggressive when fighting, but when it comes to the women around him, including Anzelotte, he lets them walk all over him to the point where he gets constantly embarrassed by Angelotte on an episode by episode basis while also being beaten up in defense of the girls and by his childhood 'friend' Kureha for simple, comical matters. A secret that Kureha knows of Hiiragi is used as fuel to get him to do anything she wants and at any time in order for her not to tell (It is never revealed). She often uses this to get him to do things for her. He and Kureha are very close though, as proven in the beginning of episode 12 where it shows them both as little kids. Kureha wasn't going to get any presents for Christmas and so Renji runs off to get one for her himself.

Elis Shihō— She transferred to Kimei Academy. On her first day at school she was recruited into the Astronomy Club by Kureha Akabane. During a fight with an emulator her magical broom named Ain Soph Aur, which takes the form of her bracelet, revealed its power to protect her. Anzelotte informs Elis that she believes that Elis' special ability will allow them to get to the Emulators world. To do this she must first collect the seven Jewels of Virtue in order to complete the Ain Soph Aur.

- Jewel of Kindness—Elis found this orange jewel inside of the ancient tree by Kimei Academy while in the trance in which she first discovered her powers. Its power is to heal. So far we have only seen Elis heal herself with it.
- Jewel of Wisdom—Elis and team tracked this blue jewel down inside of a temple on the magical continent of Magallanica.
- Jewel of Fortitude—This purple jewel was taken from Jō ga, on the moon, who was herself using it as a source of power.
- Jewel of Faith—This green jewel was given to Elis by Andou Kurusu, a demon-sword user formerly in the employ of Anzelotte, who had kept the jewel in defiance of Anzelotte after a mission went sour.
- Jewel of Temperance—This red jewel was in the possession of Anzelotte, Elis was able to obtain after overcoming its ability those who would possess it in a dream state. This jewel was retrieved with the assistance of the Dream-User Nightmare. It has the power to suppress "all kinds of power" as described by Anzelotte, and was used shortly after to sap the magic from Pheus Mor.
- Jewel of Justice—This violet jewel was in the possession of a Demon Lord trying to summon Syaimal using the Tower of Babel. Using the Ain Soph Aur this jewel lets Shihou Elis create an energy sword out of her artifact, it was this ability that defeated the Demon Lord Amy.
- Jewel of Hope—This yellow jewel was in secreted in the icy rings of Saturn. The jewel was uncovered first by Bell Zephyr using knowledge gained from Lion's prophetic however it was lost to her during her bout with Hiiragi Renji and was subsequently given to Shihou Elis.

Kureha Akabane —She is Renji's childhood friend and also a Night Wizard. She recruited Elis to the Astronomy Club at Kimei Academy after asking her if she liked stars or not. Her artifact is a crossbow attached to her arm which, like other artifacts, has a variety of different attacks. She's a childhood friend of Hiiragi and knows a secret of his which she often holds over his head. Despite teasing Renji often, she is very attached to Renji so she says although it isn't apparent in the way she treats him. She also assumes the role of a controlling mom in Renji's life, forcing him to anything on her whim. Kureha does, however, care deeply about Renji as shown in episode 10 after he saved Elis and nearly died in the process, Kureha tells him not to be so reckless and was afraid of losing him if Elis goes out of control again. She was killed by Kirihito in episode 12, but was later resurrected through the combined powers of Anzelotte and Lion Gunta in order to foil Kirihito's summoning of Shaimal done by Elis' devastation of losing her friends. She is in love with Renji.

Akari Himuro—She is a Night Wizard who is in class 2–3 at Kimei Academy. She is a boosted-woman and also a mercenary soldier. Her broom is Gunner's Broom, which acts as a cannon that seems to do significantly more damage than other artifacts but is also much slower. Her personality is cold and always puts down Renji at any chance she gets even when it is apparent that he did not do anything. She's also a terrible cook. The first time her cooking was seen, a disgusting green ooze came out of the bento, forcing Renji to eat the entire thing to protect Elis from eating it. In fact, she has a special ability, "Destructive Cooking Skill", in the role-playing game rules. Originally she was a player character created and played by her cast Ema Kogure herself in the game sessions. She cares for a sick woman and a ferret.

Anzelotte—She gives the missions to the Night Wizard and seems to be in control. She lives in a castle which seems to be floating above Earth or in another dimension. Whenever she asks a Night Wizard to do a mission, she gives them no choice by pre-empting every mission she assigns with "For the request that I will ask you now please reply 'Okay' or 'Yes'". Despite her looks, she is much older than she seems. She comes off as an all-seeing person to everyone but Hiiragi whom she berates, embarrasses, uses against his will and torments. She doesn't seem to care about anything she does to Hiragi as long as she gets her way. One example of this is the way she gets Hiiragi to come to her palace; while everyone else gets transported in a very comfortable way she makes it unpleasant for him by hooking him on a giant hook from a helicopter for example.

Kirihito / Gazer / Ojisama—An apparently powerful Night Wizard who saves Elis on the moon. Little is known about him except that he wears the uniform of Kimei Academy secondary school. He both chides the group for not being able to protect Elis if they do not get stronger and is shown to defeat a group of emulator rabbits that could give the other Night Wizards problems with a single attack. Kirihito was also responsible for the destruction of the Tower of Babel after the Demon Lord Amy's defeat, additionally he was the only wizard to be aware of the consequences of completing the Ain Soph Aur. Following episode 12, it is revealed that Kirihito is in fact Gazer, a being whose original duty was to watch over the world for all eternity, who now is out to destroy the world with the help of Shaimal (who is contained inside Elis) so that it may be newly reborn.

Mayuri Wanstein—She is one of the Wizards who saved the world with Akari and Nightmare in previous times. Her character class is Majyutsushi (Magus) which represents orthodox magic-users. Her favorite food is Omusubi.

Nightmare—He is one of the Wizards who saved the world with Akari and Mayuri in previous times. His character class is Yume-Tsukai (Dream Hunter) which represents specialist in controlling others' dreams and minds. His favorite phrase is Dream.

Bell Zephyr—In the several official text, She is formally spelled Bael Zephyr in English, but actually she is usually called Bell. She is one of the powerful Demon Lords who looks like a teenage girl dressed with poncho and Kimei Academy's uniform. She is modelled after Beelzebub and is also called "Queen of the Fly". Bell is the central villain of the story, and her motives in retrieving the Jewels of Virtue are unknown.

Lion Gunta—Also known as the Marquis of Secrets, she is one of the Demon Lords and is a follower of Bell Zephyr. She has all knowledge and can predict the future by reading her grimoire though sometimes mistaken. She is modelled after Dantalion.

Shaimal—Considered as the God of Destruction. It is said when the Great Demon Lord Shaimal fully awakens it will destroy both Human world and the Reversal world. Its power was sealed in the seven Jewels of Virtue and when the jewels will be collected, it said that the seal will be broken.

RaRa Mu—The Demon Lord appeared in episodes #2 and #3. She is modelled after Raum.

Jō ga—The Demon Lord appeared in episode #4. She is modelled after Chang'e of Chinese mythology. Jōga is the Japanese pronounce for Chang'e.

Pheus Mor—The Demon Lord appeared in episode #6. She is modelled after the Greek god of dreams, Morpheus.

Amy—The Demon Lord appeared in episode #8. She is modelled after Amy (demon).

Azel Iblis—The Demon Lord appeared in episode #9. She is modelled after Azazel and Iblis.

=== Episodes ===
Every volume of DVD includes two types of audio commentary. One is the commentary of anime staffs and casts. Another is RPG's designers and players of Hiiragi, Kureha, Mayuri, Nightmare and so on in the official game sessions.

DVD series is released since December 21, 2007, in Japan. DVD limited special edition includes an optional sourcebook for RPG.

=== Theme songs ===
Opening theme
Kurenai by Ui Miyazaki, composed and lyrics by Masami Okui
Ending themes
Erinyes by BETTA FLASH, composed by TAMAYO

=== Character songs ===
Vol.1
Satisfaction by Elis Shihō (Ui Miyazaki), VGCD-0125
Vol.2
WHITE HEART by Kureha Akabane (Rina Satō), VGCD-0126
Vol.3
Destiny by Akari Himuro (Ema Kogure), VGCD-0127
Vol.4
Darkness by Bell Zephyr (Yūko Gotō), VGCD-0128
Vol.5
時の行方 (Toki no Yukue (lit. Destination of the time)) by Lion Gunta (Ryōka Yuzuki), VGCD-0129

== Manga ==
A manga adaptation titled Night Wizard Comic—Variable Witch was published in video game magazine, Famitsu Playstation + from April 2007 to 2008.

== Internet radio programs ==
Two related internet radio shows were airing, Miyazaki Ui no Night Ui Wizard (Ui Miyazaki's Night "Ui"(Wi) Wizard) based on anime television series and Fear-tsu (the former name is Night Wizard Tsuusin) based on RPG. Fear-tsu are still ongoing.
