= L. E. Modesitt Jr. bibliography =

This is a complete list of works by American science fiction and fantasy author L. E. Modesitt Jr.

== Series ==
=== Fantasy fiction series ===
==== The Saga of Recluce (internal chronological order) ====
1. From the Forest (2024)
2. Overcaptain (2024)
3. Sub-Majer's Challenge (August 26, 2025)
4. Last of the First (June 30, 2026)
5. Magi'i of Cyador (2001)
6. Scion of Cyador (2001)
7. Fall of Angels (1996)
8. The Chaos Balance (1997)
9. Arms-Commander (2010)
10. Cyador's Heirs (2014)
11. Heritage of Cyador (2014)
12. The Mongrel Mage (2017)
13. Outcasts of Order (2018)
14. The Mage-Fire War (2019)
15. Fairhaven Rising (2021)
16. The Towers of the Sunset (1992)
17. The White Order (1998)
18. The Magic Engineer (1994)
19. Colors of Chaos (1999)
20. Natural Ordermage (2007)
21. Mage-Guard of Hamor (2008)
22. The Order War (1995)
23. Wellspring of Chaos (2004)
24. Ordermaster (2005)
25. The Magic of Recluce (1991)
26. The Death of Chaos (1995)

==== Spellsong Cycle ====
Set in the world of Erde, where song has magical power – and exacts a terrible price.

- The Soprano Sorceress (1997)
- The Spellsong War (1998)
- Darksong Rising (1999)
- The Shadow Sorceress (2001)
- Shadowsinger (2002)

==== The Corean Chronicles ====
Set on the world of Corus (or Acorus), where beasts roam and people with magical Talent can perform special feats.

- Legacies (2002)
- Darknesses (2003)
- Scepters (2004)
- Alector's Choice (2005)
- Cadmian's Choice (2006)
- Soarer's Choice (2006)
- The Lord-Protector's Daughter (2008)
- Lady-Protector (2011)

==== The Imager Portfolio ====
The Imager Portfolio is set on the world of Terahnar, where a small number of people are imagers, who have the power to create objects through visualization; if uncontrolled, imaging can lead to the death of the imager.

- Imager (2009), ISBN 0-7653-2034-7
- Imager's Challenge (2009), ISBN 0-7653-2126-2
- Imager's Intrigue (2010), ISBN 0-7653-2562-4
- Scholar (2011; new cast of characters, taking place, chronologically, before the first three books), ISBN 978-0-7653-2955-4
- Princeps (2012), ISBN 978-0-7653-3095-6
- Imager’s Battalion (2013), ISBN 978-0-7653-3283-7
- Antiagon Fire (2013), ISBN 978-0765-33457-2
- Rex Regis (2014), ISBN 978-0765-33634-7
- Madness in Solidar (2015), ISBN 978-0765-37985-6 (First in a set that takes place some 380 years after the Wars of Consolidation.)
- Treachery’s Tools (2016), ISBN 978-0-7653-8540-6
- Assassin's Price (2017), ISBN 978-0-7653-9047-9
- Endgames (2019), ISBN 978-1-250-29364-0

==== The Grand Illusion ====
- Isolate (2021)
- Councilor (2022)
- Contrarian (2023)
- Legalist (October 7, 2025). Takes place more than 400 years before Isolate.
- Premier (2026). Sequel to Contrarian, taking place nine years later.

=== Science fiction series ===
==== Timegod's World ====
Drawing on Norse legend, these books follow the story of the time-traveling Immortals of Query and their two greatest heroes – who both save and doom their people

- The Fires of Paratime (1982; reprinted as The Timegod (1993))
- Timediver's Dawn (1992)
- Timegod's World (2001): Omnibus

==== The Forever Hero ====
In the far future, when Earth is a ruin, an immortal is born, wishes one wish, and takes on a great task

1. Dawn for a Distant Earth (1987)
2. The Silent Warrior (1987)
3. In Endless Twilight (1988)
- The Forever Hero (2000)—Omnibus, combines the above three books

==== The Ecolitan Institute novels (internal chronological order) ====
1. The Ecolitan Operation (1989)
2. The Ecologic Secession (1990)
3. The Ecologic Envoy (1986)
4. The Ecolitan Enigma (1997)
- Empire & Ecolitan (2001) Omnibus of The Ecolitan Operation and The Ecologic Secession
- Ecolitan Prime (2003) Omnibus of The Ecologic Envoy and The Ecolitan Enigma

==== Ghost Novels ====
SF/spy stories, set in an alternate world

- Of Tangible Ghosts (1994)
- The Ghost of the Revelator (1998)
- Ghost of the White Nights (2001)
- Ghosts of Columbia (2005): Omnibus, combining Of Tangible Ghosts and The Ghost of the Revelator

==== Parafaith Universe ====
- The Parafaith War (1996)
- The Ethos Effect (2003)

==== Archform ====
- Archform: Beauty (2000), ISBN 978-0-7653-0433-9
- Flash (2004), ISBN 978-0-7653-1128-3

== Non-series science fiction ==
- The Hammer of Darkness (1985), ISBN 978-0-380-89798-8
- Adiamante (1996), ISBN 978-0-312-86021-9. Review
- Gravity Dreams (2000), ISBN 978-0-312-86826-0
- The Octagonal Raven (2001), ISBN 978-0-312-87720-0
- The Eternity Artifact (2005), ISBN 978-0-7653-1464-2
- The Elysium Commission (2007), ISBN 978-0-7653-1720-9. Review
- Haze (2009), ISBN 978-0-7653-2302-6
- Empress of Eternity (2010), ISBN 978-0-7653-2664-5
- The One-Eyed Man: A Fugue, with Winds and Accompaniment (2013), ISBN 978-0-7653-3544-9
- Solar Express (2015), ISBN 978-0-765-38195-8
- Quantum Shadows (2020), ISBN 978-1-250-22920-5

== Collaborations ==
- The Green Progression (with Bruce Scott Levinson) (1992)

== Collections ==
- Viewpoints Critical (2008) – collection of short stories
- Recluce Tales (2017) - collection of short stories that take place in the Recluce world

== Short fiction ==
- "The Great American Economy" (1973), Analog Science Fiction and Science Fact, May 1973**
- "A House by Any Other Name" (1974), Analog Science Fiction/Science Fact, November 1974
- "Came the Revolution" (1977), Galaxy Science Fiction, September 1977
- "Iron Man, Plastic Ships" (1979), Isaac Asimov's Science Fiction Magazine, Oct 1979**
- "Power to...?" (1990), Analog Science Fiction and Fact, November 1990**
- "Reaction Time" (1978), Analog Science Fiction/Science Fact, January 1978
- "Rule of Law" (1981), Analog Science Fiction/Science Fact, April 27, 1981**
- "Second Coming" (1979), Asimov's SF Adventure Magazine, Spring 1979**
- "Understanding" (2000), On Spec, Summer 2000**
- "Viewpoint Critical" (1978), Analog Science Fiction/Science Fact, July 1978
- "Precision Set" (2001), On Spec Spring 2001**
- "The Pilots (2002)", In the Shadow of the Wall: Vietnam Stories that Might Have Been (ed. Byron R. Tetrick)**
- "The Dock to Heaven" (2003), Low Port (ed. Sharon Lee & Steve Miller)**
- "The Swan Pilot" (2004), Emerald Magic: Great Tales of Irish Fantasy (ed. Andrew M. Greeley)**
- "Fallen Angel" (2004), Flights: Extreme Visions of Fantasy (ed. Al Sarrantonio)**
- "The Swan Pilot" (2004), Emerald Magic (ed. Andrew M. Greeley; Tor Books)**
- "News Clips Recovered from the NYC Ruins" (2005), The Leading Edge, Brigham Young University Press**
- "Ghost Mission" (2006), from Slipstreams (ed. Martin Greenberg and John Helfers) (DAW Books)**
- "Sisters of Sarronnyn, Sisters of Westwind" (2006), Jim Baen's Universe, August 2006**
- "Spec-Ops" (2007), Future Weapons of War (ed. Joe Haldeman and Martin Greenberg; Baen Books)**
- "The Difference" (2007), Man vs. Machine (ed. Martin Greenberg and John Helfers; DAW Books)**
- "Black Ordermage" (2008)**
- "Beyond the Obvious Wind" (2008)**
- "Always Outside the Lines" (2008)**
- "Life-Suspension" (2009), Federations (ed. John Joseph Adams, Prime Books)
- "Astralis" (2009) Jim Baen's Universe January 2009
- "The Stranger" Speculative Horizons (ed. Patrick St-Denis) Subterranean Press 2010
- "New World Blues" Tor.com February 2012
- "The Bronze Man of Mars" 2012 Under the Moons of Mars (ed. John Joseph Adams) Simon & Schuster
- "A More Perfect Union" (2013), The Mad Scientist's Guide to World Domination (ed. John Joseph Adams)
- "Gold and Glory" 2017 All Hail Our Robot Conquerors (ed. Patricia Bray and Joshua Palmatier) ZNB Books
- "The Liberator" 2018 [The Razor's Edge] (ed. Troy Bucher and Joshua Palmatier) ZNB Books
- "The Fallen" 2020 Fantastic Hope (ed. Laurell K. Hamilton and William McCaskey) Berkley
- "Evanescence" 2020 Shapers of Worlds (ed. Edward Willett) Shadowpaw Press
- "The Unexpected Dachshund" Instinct:An Animal Rescuers Anthology (ed. L.J. Hachmeister) Source7 Productions

"Stories listed above marked with a double-asterisk are included in L. E. Modesitt, Jr., Viewpoints Critical: Selected Stories (New York: Tor Books, 2008), ISBN 978-0-7653-1857-2. The three stories dated 2008 appeared for the first time in this book.

== Short non-fiction ==
- Story Behind Antiagon Fire – "The Antiagon Fire That Almost Wasn't" (2013), from Story Behind the Book: Volume 1
