= The Corean Chronicles =

Book series by L. E. Modesitt, Jr.

The Corean Chronicles is a fantasy series of books by the author L. E. Modesitt, Jr. As of 2011, it consists of:

- Legacies (2002)
- Darknesses (2003)
- Scepters (2004)
- Alector's Choice (2005)
- Cadmian's Choice (2006)
- Soarer's Choice (2006)
- The Lord-Protector's Daughter (2008)
- Lady-Protector (2011)

== Plot and background ==
The current books in the series comprise two trilogies in different time frames of the same world, with significant ties to each other. The first three books are set in a time frame roughly a thousand years after the events in the later three books.

The first trilogy introduces the world of Corus as a world that used to be ruled by a great civilization, that spanned the entire continent. However, a magical disaster caused its fall, ending a golden age. In the books, Corus is full of countries fighting for superiority, humans struggling to survive, and strange animals that are a product of and dependent on the life force-derived magic of the world. Additionally, there are rarely seen creatures – Soarers and Sanders – that are entities of pure life force. The fall of the civilization caused much to have been forgotten, but some few of the people of Corus still command magical powers, referred to as Talent. With that power comes the cost of having the lords of the world trying to gain influence over and control of Talent wielders. Among the denizens of Corus, these special features of the world are commonly referred to with phrases such as Talent magic, Talent wielders, and Talent creatures, among others.

The second trilogy, returning to the era of the lost civilization, introduces the civilization's caretaker minority, the Alectors, who are human-like entities that exist on Corus, "linked" to their former worlds with pure life-force. While the first trilogy portrays these beings as evil – for indeed they are not natives of Corus – the later books portray the Alectors through their own point of view. Paradoxically, humans are not native to Corus either. (They are ancient genetic creations of the Alectors.) The Alectors consider regular humans (commonly referred to as steers, Landers, Indigens) inferior. Alectors are by nature, Talent wielders. Fusing their powers with technical knowledge, they are the ones that have created the infrastructure and glory of civilization that is later lost.

Place names are used frequently and complexly, however, a full map of Corus is included in each book – readers are advised to check it often.

=== Legacies ===
Legacies begins during the childhood of the main character, Alucius. His father is killed in action while serving in the Militia, leaving his grandparents and mother to raise him on the family Nightsheep farm in the small country of The Iron Valleys. When older, he himself is conscripted into the Militia to fight off the impending invasion by the western super-power, Madrien. During a pitched battle, he is captured and enslaved into the armies of the monarch of Madrien, the Matrial. After many months of combat against other nations, he discovers how to free himself from the magical collars that control the slave armies, and frees a company of others who then flee back to the Iron Valleys, and freedom.

== Parallels to The Saga of Recluce ==
The Corean Chronicles deal with many of the same issues as The Saga of Recluce, in a similarly detailed world. There are small differences in how the magic works with a less clearly defined good and evil magic. Also, wild nature magic has become a strong component.

== The Alectors ==
On Acorus, the Duarchs, a pair of joint rulers, oversee the remaining Alectors from their seats of power in the cities of Elcien and Ludar. The Duarchs report only to the Archon, the ruler of all Alectors, who resides on whichever planet houses the Master Scepter, a mechanism on which most Alector technology depends. At the time of these stories, both the Archon and the Master Scepter reside on Ifryn. Because they have equal power and because their superior is so far away, the Duarchs intrigue against each other, co-opting various lesser Alectors into these schemes. Strict rules govern what Alectors may do, and the punishment for violating these rules is generally death (with the offender's life force painfully stripped from him by a scourge-like device). For this reason, the schemes are complex, designed to maximize advantage while minimizing actions likely to require overt response. Within this framework, accidents, usually fatal, occur regularly. Generally speaking, such struggles violate the tenets of The Views of the Highest a set of teachings that forms the basis of the Alectors' ethical framework. As a framework, it contains many ideas derived from sound ethics, but places the Alectors firmly in a stewardship role over their subjects, in some sense like the attitudes of Victorian England.

When a world has a sufficiency of life-force, Alectors transfer to it in larger numbers. Their activities generally overwhelm the world's ability to sustain them, and they eventually drain the world entirely. For this reason, among the projects Alectors normally launch from a new world is the location and establishment of their presence on yet another world (or worlds) to which they can move when they must. As of this story, the world of Ifryn has established two such colonies – Acorus, and a rival Efra.

Individuals of the subject races (steers) occasionally manifest Talent. The Alectors are jealous of their supposed monopoly on this array of powers, and usually destroy any steer who demonstrates signs of Talent. Steers that survive do so either because no Alector notices them, because they are powerful enough to destroy Alectors that attempt to destroy them (very rare), or because they are employed in some Alector plot or other. Involvement in Alector machinations, either willingly or otherwise, generally only delays destruction. Even if the steer's faction wins, when he is no longer useful the Alectors of his faction will destroy him. The most powerful steers can rival an Alector in Talent, but usually lack formal training and are therefore generally overmatched. Among steers, Talent is at least partially heritable.

== The Ancients ==
Acorus was once inhabited by a race variously called the Ancients or the Soarers. They are wispy, fairy-like creatures usually surrounded by an amber-green glow (generally visible only to the Talented), the Soarers are few in number and appear only infrequently. They also live off the life force of Acorus, so the Alectors' activities threaten their survival. They oppose the Alectors within the limits of their numbers and their powers, but the use of their powers, and corresponding use of the Alectors' powers in opposition, simply makes the situation worse. Their species is actually made up of two very dissimilar "genders" the intelligent, talented but weak Soarers, and the strong but unintelligent Sanders that have the ability to drain life force.

Certain Alectors can link themselves directly to the world where they reside. This process disconnects them from the Master Scepter and the network of Tables, changes the nature of their Talent, and even appearance. Most other Alectors regard such individuals as little better than talented steers, but they can survive massive disruptions of the Table network that kill Alectors still connected to the Master Scepter through it.

== Powers of the Talented ==
All Alectors and a few of their subjects (landers, or steers) possess a psionic potential called Talent. The degree of Talent varies among individuals. Alectors receive formal training in the use of their Talent, to the limits of their ability. Talent occasionally strengthens in later life. Specific noted powers include:

=== Detection of Talent ===
Everyone with Talent can generally see Talent in other objects. The ability manifests as a perceived glow or aura surrounding the object. The color represents the nature of the talent. Talent mechanisms generally produce a black or silver glow, while individuals glow according to the nature of their talent and the power of it. The natives of Acorus, called Ancients, have a yellowish-green aura, while many Alectors have a purplish-pink aura, and talented steers have a deeper green aura shading to black. The Talented can often sense whether someone is truthful, and can sometimes read an individual's emotional state. Individuals whose auras bear reddish streaks usually cause trouble sooner or later; they lack control of their baser impulses.

Talent probes, essentially "feelers" or tendrils of invisible Talent can be used to examine areas beyond normal Talent detection, to manipulate the life force energy embedded or contained in objects, or to draw upon Talent energy from an open source, such as a Table or a ley line.

=== Empathic Projection ===
Alectors and talented steers can use their talent to project feelings to help in the persuasion or domination of others. This ability sees much use by both Alectors and talented steers to help them reassure, persuade or command usually less-Talented others. Rarely, it has been used to try to force another to perform an action against their will.

=== Shields ===
Alectors, and occasionally powerful landers, can form defensive shields that can block detection of their Talent (except at close range) and feelings, turn aside hostile physical and Talent attacks, create barriers to prevent the movement of others or even crush them. Usually a more powerful individual can eventually pierce such shields, but as this is time-consuming and exhausting, it may leave the attacker vulnerable to counter-attack from other sources.

=== Piercing ===
Somewhat related to shields, some Alectors can form what they see as points or wedges of Talent, and can direct these against the shields of another Alector in advance of or as part of an attack. This amounts to a Talent vs. Talent competition; the individual whose Talent shields are weaker loses.

=== Invisibility ===
Highly Talented Alectors can bend light around themselves, producing a form of invisibility. Others with Talent and training can detect them if they have reason to suspect their presence, but do not do so automatically.

=== Talent locks ===
A Talent lock employs life force to create a secure condition on a door or container. Safe passage requires removal of such a lock by a similarly Talented individual (who normally replaces it).

=== Infuse life-force ===
Alectors with the aptitude and training become Engineers, and they can infuse life force into crystals of various sorts. These crystals form the basis of Alector technology, and extend what may be done with Talent. Objects infused with life-force are exceptionally durable (lasting for thousands of years), but they draw on the life-force base of the world in small measure, limiting the quantity that may be safely produced. For this reasons, only the structures and property of the Alectors are generally so treated.

=== Aiming ===
Extremely Talented landers seem able to use their Talent to "will" projectiles such as bullets or Talent energy to strike their target. Such projectiles are normally far more accurate. In addition, they can be imbued with a "charge" of life force that can disrupt the life force of the target and pierce Talent shields. Alectors hit by such bullets may be severely injured or (more often) killed immediately. Wild translations, the unfortunate result of using certain Alector technology incorrectly, also die when hit by such bullets; they contain more life-force and usually explode or immolate when they die.

=== Wild translations ===
Interplanetary travel, as from Ifryn to Acorus, carries additional hazards. If too few attempt it, the translation corridors become balky, so that only those of great Talent can pass. If too many attempt it, the corridors become porous, occasionally decanting travelers midway to their destination, a fatal mishap. Even with the corridor operating properly, individuals may fail to translate correctly, due to weakness of Talent, accident, or sabotage. These unfortunates become Wild Translations, creatures tied directly to life-force and usually of some monstrous form of another. Alectors commonly seek out and destroy such creatures when they appear, for they are very dangerous. Wild translations often appear in the vicinity of a table, but can appear miles away. A Talented individual can sometimes sense a change before a Wild Translation materializes. Occasionally, the life-force of an individual splits into several creatures, when this happens, all appear at once. Wild translations are not intelligent.

=== Shadow-matching ===
Alectors with very important responsibilities are shadow-matched to hierarchically superior Alectors. For example, the Duarchs of a colony are shadow-matched to the Archon who rules all Alectors. Shadow-matching prevents the matched individual from disobeying orders and compels him to act in the best interests of another individual, even to the point of being unable to consider ideas that conflict with these interests. The shadow-matched individual retains free will in other areas, and is aware of the constraints on his behavior. A shadow-matched individual may possess additional reserves of talent tied to the shadow-match conditions; anything that breaks these conditions generally dissipates this reserve. The example contained in the stories is that of the Duarches, dual rulers of Acorus. These men possessed enormous reserves of Talent, but when they learned that the Master Scepter would go to Efra and not to Acorus, their shadow-match conditioning broke, and their reserves of Talent dissipated. This event weakened the rulers considerably, and strengthened lesser but ambitions Alectors seeking power for themselves.

=== Soaring ===
The Ancients were also called Soarers for their common appearance in the air. When connected to the world life force web, especially the ley lines, talented humans such as Alucius (Scepters) and Mykella (Lady-Protector) could also soar (levitate).

== Alector technology ==
Most Alector technology revolves around the artificial manipulation of life force, sometimes referred to as Talent energy. At least one Alector Engineer makes comments strongly suggesting that Alector technology has been in slow decline for thousands of years.

=== The Master Scepter ===
The Master Scepter ties all Alectors to their world. Even Alectors born on other worlds are tied through the Master Scepter. This link grants Alectors greatly increased lifespans, the ability to manipulate Talent to various degrees, and changes their appearance – Alectors on other worlds are very pale skinned and have very dark hair. (Hair and skin color are recurring distinguishing characteristics in Modesitt novels). These Alectors are also quite tall, and their physical height is often proportionate to their Talent energy. The Duarchs and Archon, the most Talented Alectors, are around three meters (ten feet) tall. Alectors linked to the Master Scepter, but existing on other worlds disintegrate when they die, leaving behind little beyond a fine ash.

When a world which hosts the Master Scepter is exhausted of most life force (to the point that it cannot support Alectors), the Archon, leader of the Alectors, moves the Master Scepter to a new world. Modesitt does not discuss the specifics of this process, but it creates instability in the Table networks, causing tables to release energies that kill those nearby.

=== The Dual Scepters ===
The Dual Scepters form part of the power network on Acorus. Modesitt implies that these powerful devices are closely connected to the Master Scepter, and are the first devices Alectors bring to a new world. They form the basis of the Table network. Individuals, such as Engineers, with sufficient training and skill may exploit the scepters to create other effects. The matriarchy of Madrien, in the later books, employed one of the scepters to project a kind of gem through which every male soldier could be killed or tortured. Male soldiers wore a collar controlled by their superiors that could interfere with their life force; all of these collars were connected to the gem and the scepter.

=== Tables ===
Early in their rule, Talented Alector engineers establish a network of tables. These black slabs, composed of many small energy storage crystals, establish a grid. The relative geometry of table placement affects the stability of such a grid, which somewhat limits table placement. Once established, Tables may not be removed or moved. Attempts to tamper with them generally cause Talent explosions, which are normally fatal for those in the vicinity. The planet of Acorus possesses a web, or mesh, of life force lines (compare to ley lines) that intersect in various places. Places where three or more such intersections occur are suitable locations for Tables, since they draw on this life force parasitically.

Talented individuals may employ a Table to travel to any other Table within a few seconds. During the travel interval the traveler perceives a series of tubes or conduits with colored markers. Each color designates a destination. Talent and skill partially control this; it is possible for a more Talented Alector to leave later and arrive earlier than a less talented Alector.

A subclass of Alectors known as Recorders of Deeds maintain and operate the Tables. They know the secrets of their operation, and generally do not share these with anyone outside their profession (but there have been exceptions {Dainyl} ). Talented individuals trained by Recorders can learn to perceive the psionic mechanisms that operate the Tables; using these controls, the Table may be employed to scan other parts of Acorus (even into the recent past) and may be temporarily or permanently deactivated. Recorders may also create "limbs" of Talent that they may use to attack others, but care is important, for any error may cause a Talent explosion. Recorders can also monitor the network, the operating status of other tables and of the grid, and can usually discern who is traveling and when they will arrive. It is very difficult to damage a Table (they have survived the complete collapse of the building housing them), but the effects of doing so are usually catastrophic. If sufficient Tables fail, the entire grid can collapse, so Alectors usually investigate and correct Table problems quickly.

=== Eternastone/Life Force imbued materials ===
Alectors could bind life force into various materials. Such materials possessed great durability (lasting in some cases thousands of years after the end of the Alector occupation). Eternastone, a building material used for roads and official buildings, is one example of this. Alector garments so treated could turn aside bullets (doubtless such garments were created so that Alectors might permit their Cadmians – armed forces recruited from locals – to have firearms).

=== Light sources ===
Alector residences and official buildings were commonly lit by steady burning torches that exploited small amounts of life force to create light. Although not particularly greedy of life force, such devices were reserved to Alectors only, at least during the earliest portions of their reign.

=== Talent creatures ===
Alectors have, or had, the ability to create life from life force. At the time of their occupation of Acorus, they seem limited in the forms available: there are Sandoxen, large beasts of burden, and Pteridons, reptilian fliers used by the Alector airforce, the Myrmidons. If other forms exist, these are not widely used. Talent creatures tend to explode into flames if sufficiently damaged; this usually incinerates anyone in the vicinity. Pteridons are tied to specific living Alectors (their Myrimdon pilots); they may be easily reassigned if their pilot dies, but are reassigned only with great effort if their pilot still lives.

=== Skylances ===
The main weapons of mounted Myrmidons, skylances draw on either their stored life-force (enough for one or two firings) or the lifeforce of the pteridon being ridden to emit a stream of blue fire. For security reasons, the design of the skylance, which is a sealed unit, precludes its use without a pteridon. Since a pteridon is tied to a living Alector, this limits the ability of ambitious Alectors to employ these dangerous weapons in rebellion. This is a design decision, and not a limitation on Alector technology generally. Pteridons will retrieve and protect their designated skylance when not in use, or if their pilot has been killed.

=== Lightcutters ===
Essentially a laser, the lightcutter draws life energy stored in an attached crystal and focuses it into a beam that may be used as a tool, or offensively. A sufficiently Talented Alector can turn aside such beams with his Talent shields, or sometimes even turn them back on the attacker. Because they draw life force, and because ambitious Alectors could use them in rebellion, lightcutters are normally found only in hand held, pistol sized models. Towards the end of the reign of Alectors on Acorus, much more powerful versions existed; these or their plans were brought from Ifryn. Loyal Alectors made their destruction a priority, as their monstrous life force requirements threatened the long-term future of all life on Acorus. While such weapons are deadly, they are also vulnerable. A Talented Alector can sense their presence, and the energy flow present when they operate. At close range, he can isolate and attack the control crystals; the failure of such crystals usually causes an explosion that frees all the stored life force, and sometimes creates a vacuum that drains anyone nearby of their life force.

=== Crystal spear thrower ===
The crystal spear thrower played a role in the first three novels; it was mentioned obliquely in the prequel trilogy. The engineer who constructed it stated that only one such device might operate in the world at a time. Considering that Alector heavy weapons draw greedily on the planetary life force, one presumes that operating more than one such device would send Acorus hurtling towards a possibly fatal life force deficit, but this is never explicitly stated. A complex mechanism of crystals and wiring, the spear thrower fuses sand (shoveled into a hopper) into glassy flechettes that it hurls from a barrel-like "formulator." The engineer simply points this at the target. The device can reduce even stony hills to gravel in short order; it was derived from equipment used to cut passes through high land formations in the process of road building.

== Internal chronology ==
The first Alectors reached Corus almost five thousand years prior to Alector's Choice.

Modesitt has said there is no definitive chronology for the books; he has stated that The Lord Protector's Daughter takes place roughly 200 to 300 years after Soarer's Choice, and 1,000 to 1,500 years before Legacies.
