= The Elysium Commission =

2007 novel by L. E. Modesitt, Jr

- First Edition book cover
- Author: L. E. Modesitt, Jr.
- Cover artist: David Seeley
- Language: English
- Genre: Science fiction, Detective fiction
- Publisher: TOR
- Publication date: February 2007
- Publication place: United States
- Media type: Print (hardcover)
- Pages: 336 (first edition hardcover)
- ISBN: 0-7653-1720-6
- OCLC: 73140223
- Dewey Decimal: 813/.54 22
- LC Class: PS3563.O264 E94 2007
- Preceded by: The Eternity Artifact
- Followed by: The Natural Ordermage

The Elysium Commission is a science fiction novel by American writer L. E. Modesitt, Jr., published in 2007. Set in the far future, the novel follows private investigator Blaine Donne as he investigates several different cases.

== Literary significance and reception ==
Reviews of The Elysium Commission were mixed. Kirkus Reviews said that the novel had "some brisk action closes the proceedings, but otherwise, mediocre problems and solutions--our hero has little idea how to Google for information and spends most of his time asking his friends for gossip." Publishers Weekly said "Modesitt cleverly weaves together disparate threads of information to form a complete tapestry." Jackie Cassada reviewing for the Library Journal said "Prolific sf author Modesitt (the "Spellsong Cycle") creates a far-future tale of intrigue and mystery featuring a tough but admirable sleuth."

== Allusions ==
Throughout the book, Modesitt makes tongue-in-cheek references to a number of other science fiction and fantasy authors. These are usually in the form of statements or thoughts by a character, and often jumble the order of the authors names or of their novels. Examples include "Jordan Robert" (Robert Jordan) and "The Lictor's Sword" (in reference to Gene Wolfe's The Sword of the Lictor). Other references are made to Ursula K. Le Guin's The Left Hand of Darkness. Another author given a nod is Paula Volsky.
