= The Eternity Artifact =

2005 novel by L. E. Modesitt, Jr

- First edition
- Author: L. E. Modesitt, Jr.
- Cover artist: David Seeley
- Language: English
- Genre: Science fiction
- Publisher: TOR
- Publication date: February 2005
- Publication place: United States
- Media type: Print (hardcover)
- Pages: 367 (first edition hardcover)
- ISBN: 978-0-7653-5345-0
- OCLC: 70173603
- Preceded by: Flash
- Followed by: The Elysium Commission

The Eternity Artifact is a science fiction novel by American writer L. E. Modesitt, Jr., published in 2005. It is set in a future approximately 3,000 years hence, in a galaxy largely colonized by humans but divided into disparate polities who strive against each other in a manner similar to that of modern-day nations. Once such group, the Comity, discovers a planet that may be the first evidence of nonhuman intelligent life. The Comity mounts an expedition to investigate this world, and certain of the other groups attempt to interfere in various ways and for various reasons. The story discusses the expedition from the perspective of four viewpoint characters. It details the progress of the explorers and touches on the differences between the various human groups and how those inform their response to this discovery, and their goals regarding it.

== References to other works ==
Modesitt paraphrases Arthur C. Clarke's assertion that "Any sufficiently advanced technology is indistinguishable from magic."
