= The Green Progression =

Novel by L. E. Modesitt, Jr

- First edition cover
- Author: L. E. Modesitt and Bruce Scott Levinson
- Publisher: Tor Books
- Publication date: 1992
- ISBN: 978-0-312-85212-2

The Green Progression is a 1992 novel by American authors L. E. Modesitt and Bruce Scott Levinson about how good intentions have a way of backfiring, especially when the people involved in the cause are being manipulated by others.

== Plot summary ==
As a former staffer at the Environmental Protection Agency, Jack McDarvid, the main character, knows all about extremists in the cause of virtue. He now works for a law firm that represents companies that need clearances or information about just what is or is not allowed. But then his boss is killed in a shootout near the Capitol, and nothing is what it seems. And no one what they appear to be.

From Moscow to Washington, from a near hit and run to the very real threat of a nuclear time bomb in the hands of a fanatic with a point to prove, The Green Progression moves non-stop through the machinations behind the scenes of the environmental movement.
