= Adiamante =

1996 novel by L. E. Modesitt, Jr.

- First edition cover
- Author: L. E. Modesitt, Jr.
- Language: English
- Genre: Science Fiction novel
- Publisher: Tor Books
- Publication date: October 1996
- Publication place: United States
- Media type: Print (hardcover)
- Pages: 316 pp
- ISBN: 0-312-86021-8
- OCLC: 34583943
- Dewey Decimal: 813/.54 20
- LC Class: PS3563.O264 A64 1996

Adiamante is a 1996 science fiction novel written by L. E. Modesitt, Jr. It is outside the span of his series work but maintains several of his main themes, including justification of pre-emptive force, nanotechnology, a nearly destroyed but rebuilt Earth, misuse of technology leading to man's downfall, internalized information networks, and shortening or slurring of the names of present-day cities, countries and ethnic groups, along with historical events.

== Plot summary ==
After gaining power over genetics and technology, three sects of humanity have developed and split after a civil war on earth forced them apart. Now, far into the future, the deported sect has returned to force their rule on the remaining citizens of earth.

== The Sects ==
=== The demis ===
Perhaps a shortened form of demigod. Demis are the product of generations of genetic engineering with integrated and non-intrusive cybernetics. Demis tend to use a more subtle but no less forceful approach than their cyb cousins. Demis focus more on acceptance of ‘whole body reality’ and used the precursor technology to achieve a sort of gestalt-consciousness. It is implied that this technology led to great self-understanding and awareness. Demis occasionally have draff offspring. There are no cybs born to demis.

=== The cybs ===
A shortened form of cyborg. Cybs are the descendants of people who integrated their consciousness with computers and whose objective is to lead a life bound strictly by machine-like logic and precision. While they have achieved great technological prowess their understanding of their motives, which they arrogantly presume to be logical, is highly flawed. Millennia ago the cybs lost a war with the demis and were exiled from earth. Millennia later burning with humiliation at their exile the cybs return to exact revenge on the descendants of those who exiled them. Cybs insist that all their children become cybs. There are almost no draffs on cyb worlds. Cybs do not have demi children.

=== The draffs ===
Draffs are neither cyb or demi. Possibly the name is derived from American English meaning dregs, or the refuse left from brewing. An ordinary draff prefers to keep their thoughts inside their head rather than using the fibre-lines of the cybs or the webs of the demis. A draff (on earth) still has the genetic engineering that the demis have, they simply have not received the full technological package of implants required to become a demi. Roughly 30% of draffs have the potential to become demis if they were willing to accept the societal price. Draffs sometimes have demi offspring on earth, but never cyb children. Draffs on other worlds might have cyb children.
