= Gravity Dreams =

1999 novel by L. E. Modesitt, Jr.

- First edition
- Author: L. E. Modesitt, Jr.
- Cover artist: Stephen Youll
- Language: English
- Genre: Science fiction
- Publisher: Tor
- Publication date: 1999
- Media type: Print (Hardcover, Softcover)
- Pages: 399
- ISBN: 0-312-86826-X
- LC Class: 99-22966

Gravity Dreams is a 1999 science fiction novel by L. E. Modesitt, Jr.

== Synopsis ==
The novel is set in the year 4512, when humans have achieved spaceflight faster than the speed of light, along with nanotechnology. Gravity Dreams centers around main character, Tyndel, who was raised in Dorcha, whose culture uses the philosophy of Dzin as a means of social control. Dzin preaches that what you see is, and not to ask questions that a scientist normally would. Tyndel is a master of Dzin. One day he is attacked and infected with nanites. This brands him as a 'Demon' because Dorcha has rejected technology, as the cause of a major ecological collapse centuries before.

After escaping from prison, Tyndel returns to his wife, and sees her killed by the people who he thought were meant to protect her. After taking revenge by killing the man who infected him with the nanites, Tyndel flees north to the "Demon Nation" of Rykasha, which still retains high technology and uses nanites.

He is taken to a medical facility after experiencing weird lights across his vision, and told that he was infected with an ancient strain of nanites that would have killed him. They are replaced with more balanced nanites adjusted to his system. He is introduced to his handler Cerrelle, who explains that it is her duty to help him adjust to their society and become a productive citizen so that he can repay his debt for their help.

Tyndel is riddled with guilt over his wife's death and sees many of her attributes in Cerrelle. He believes the system should care for him, even though he knows that on a social level that is not possible. He rejects everything he is offered, but slowly learns more about the world he now lives in, which clashes with the views inculcated by his training. Cerrelle forces him to question his beliefs in Dzin, and why its teachings oppose technology.

Tyndel is meant to start training as a web jockey, able to pilot faster-than-light ships. He rejects this training and is instead transported to Omega Eridiani, where he spends three years in a menial job, low in the Rykasha social ladder. Cerrelle attempts to entice him back and they quarrel over what he really wants. Tyndel gets involved with a colleague, and when she dies in an accident, he begins to question his choices, eventually requesting to return to web-jockey training.

He undergoes extreme training to improve his physical condition, and repairs his relationship with Cerrelle, while also beginning to again experience distorted vision.

Eventually he is further enhanced by nanites, so he can link with the faster-than-light Web Needle ships. After another year of space training he becomes a web jockey. While in the web, Tyndel hears a voice asking him questions. It is an entity called Engee ('Nanite God'), telling him that it requires his consciousness to act as an observation platform for a reverse-energy universe. Tyndel accepts and is sent through, learning that Engee is a group of nanites created by the 'Ancients' of Earth before the devastation, which is attempting to prevent the universe from completing its purpose by replacing the information lost by the expansion of the universe with matter from another universe.

Afterwards, Tyndel returns to Earth and explains what has happened. The Demons believe it is the end of their society, but Tyndel suggests that they trade with the station of 'followers', who have some technology that the Demons do not, such as gravity control. He returns to Cerrelle and explains that he and his children will no longer require the nanite treatments as Engee has incorporated the nanites into his genetics.

The book ends with Tyndel returning to Dorcha to reflect on the past before returning to his new home in the north.

== Reception ==
In a review for the SF Site, Greg L. Johnson wrote that the book "is billed as an action-adventure story, but the action actually serves to lure the reader in to what is really a novel of character and social philosophy."

A reviewer for Publishers Weekly wrote that "some readers might be put off by the excessive philosophizing on Dzin naturalism vs. Rykashan pragmatism, the novel is loaded with enough hard science and space opera elements to please the author's large and avid body of fans."

Kirkus delivered a mixed review commenting that the story has a "persuasive alternate socioeconomic system, solid personal growth, and memorably weird hyperspace – along with a disappointing plot and a so-so chat with an uninteresting god."
