= The Octagonal Raven =

2001 novel by L. E. Modesitt, Jr

- Author: L. E. Modesitt
- Language: English
- Genre: Science fiction
- Publisher: Tor
- Publication date: February 24, 2001
- Publication place: United States
- Media type: Paperback
- Pages: 432
- ISBN: 0-312-87720-X
- OCLC: 45080139
- Dewey Decimal: 813/.54 21
- LC Class: PS3563.O264 O28 2001

The Octagonal Raven is a 2001 science fiction novel by L. E. Modesitt, Jr.

== Synopsis ==
The Octagonal Raven is set in the distant future, where nanites are prevalent throughout society, for those who can afford them. The story follows Daryn Alwyn, the younger son of one of the richest families in the world. He is augmented with nanites, and is a “pre-select,” or someone whose mental and physical abilities were tuned before birth by DNA manipulation. Despite this, he does not go to work for his family, the owners of one of the largest media corporations on the planet. Instead, he chooses to follow his own path, first by going into the military, then by becoming a freelance editorial writer. He lives in isolation, but after surviving an assassination attempt, he is forced to notice the growing cultural strains around him. The pre-selects, due to their abilities and thus money, make up 10% of the population, but control over 95% of the resources of the world, and are using that power to shut out the “norms,” or non-augmented humans.

A plague breaks out that only kills augmented humans, a plague much more virulent than a similar one that had swept the world 20 years before. Alwyn discovers that he is immune, however, as the supposed assassination attempt was actually a vaccination against the plague. After his family is killed, by assassination in the case of his sister and the plague for his parents and older brother, he finds out that both plagues were non-human in origin, caused by octagonal nanites, reminiscent of the very ancient octagonal jumpgate that had been found in deep space, rather than the round designs of human nanites and jumpgates. The newest plague, however, was engineered by Eldyn Nahal, the norm who stopped the first plague, as revenge for the power control of the pre-selects. After Nahal is killed, Alwyn takes over his family's company, stopping an attempt by the power elite to merge the largest media corporations, thus controlling all sources of news. He uses the company to expose how these handful of pre-selects are attempting to take control of everything, forever shutting out all norms and those pre-selects who stand against them. The book ends after they are all dead or incarcerated.
