= The Parafaith War =

Science fiction novel by L. E. Modesitt, Jr

- Author: L. E. Modesitt, Jr.
- Language: English
- Series: The Parafaith War
- Genre: Science fiction
- Publisher: Tor
- Publication date: February 1996
- Publication place: United States
- Media type: Print (Hardcover, Paperback)
- Pages: 480
- ISBN: 0-8125-3894-3 (revised) and ISBN 978-0-8125-3894-6
- OCLC: 36381072
- Followed by: The Ethos Effect

The Parafaith War (1996) is a science fiction novel by American writer L. E. Modesitt, Jr. It is set in a future where humanity has spread to the stars and divided into several factions. Two factions, the Eco-Tech Coalition and the Revenants of the Prophet ("revs") are engaged in a futile war over territory and their competing social philosophies. The ecologically-aware Coalition must hold back the zealous rev hordes constantly seeking new territory for their ever-expanding theocratic society.

== Overview ==
The protagonist, Trystin Desoll, is a lieutenant in the Service, the military of the Eco-Tech Coalition. He is an elite soldier, a product of the Coalition preference for quality over quantity. He begins as duty officer in East Red Three, a perimeter station at the east border of the planoformed region of the planet Mara, in the Parvati solar system. Mara is currently undergoing extensive planoforming by the Coalition, and as such has become a choice target of the revs.

The revs invade through the use of massive asteroid "troid" ships full of soldiers in cryogenic sleep. Troids carry dozens of low-power paragliders, invisible to (otherwise) highly accurate energy-detection scanners, which dump several squads each of rev soldiers in the badlands beyond the borders of planoformed regions. The perimeter stations, which are tasked with protecting the planoforming machines, are extensively armed and armored to do so.

Trystin faces increasingly powerful assaults by the revs, who almost literally walk into the guns in waves. The difficulties begin when one of the revs he takes captive turns out to have been fashioned into a living bomb, a high explosive that Trystin evades only thanks to the jumped-up reflexes enabled by his neural implant, standard to all Coalition soldiers. The conflict escalates further as the revs begin bringing in rocket launchers and stealth armor, making Trystin's job more and more trying. He is forced to abandon East Red Three temporarily after one attack, and a final assault with hovertanks nearly causes him to lose a leg and the base itself. He discovers only later that his is one of only two bases to survive at all against the rev hovertanks, the other being East Red Four, under Major Ulteena Freyer.

Trystin is offered pilot training in the Chevel system and accepts, along with Major Freyer. Pilot training is difficult and the duties of a pilot almost certainly condemn them to isolation from those they know and love: the faster-than-light "translation" engines cause some time lag between initiation and arrival, anywhere from hours up to multiple decades. Even the smallest translation errors add up eventually, isolating Service pilots who may be called upon to make numerous jumps over long distances in sub-optimal conditions, which further increases translation errors.

Serving as a pilot mimics Trystin's time on the perimeter, especially since he is sent to a cruiser in the Parvati system. He serves on board the Willis, under Major James Sasaki, a tactically brilliant man who is unfortunately deficient in piloting ability, and considered by many to have gotten his ship due to being from a powerful family in the arms industry. The missions against the troids are not very difficult at first, but the constant repetition and ever-increasing danger wear down Trystin and the Willis both. Trystin's skill and Sasaki's brilliance pull the cruiser through battles that newer and better ships fail to survive, until Trystin is once more offered a new job: spy.

Due to the fissioning of human society along roughly racial lines, much of the Coalition's population is somewhat dark-skinned and dark-haired, or very obviously of east-Asian stock. Trystin comes from one of the rare few old-Anglo families in the Coalition, however, and his pale skin and light hair make him look just like a rev, who are predominantly Caucasian and fair-haired. For this reason, Trystin is taken by the Service's intelligence division as a potential field agent. Many intelligence agents are drawn from the pilot ranks, since much of the work requires piloting in rev systems. He is pressed through an intensive conditioning process to learn to act like a rev, and adopts the name of Brother Hyriss to infiltrate the rev capital world of Orum. There, he is to assassinate a rev general, in hopes of throwing rev planning into disarray and stalling the war for just a little while.

Through this time, Trystin has also been participating in a medical and social study of humanity being performed by the Farhkans, one of the only other sapient races known to humanity. The Farhkans have highly advanced technology, and share some of their knowledge with the Coalition in exchange for permission to conduct the study. Several times, Trystin has to go through a physical, and endure short discussions with one Farhkan or another - most frequently, one named Rhule Ghere. The Farhkans press Trystin on matters of ethics, asking about the thieving nature of sentient life and semantic questions. In their last meeting, Ghere gives Trystin an implant-transmitted code to access the great Temple at the heart of the revs' capital city of Wystuh on Orum, and tells Trystin that he (Ghere) is his patron.

Trystin reaches Orum safely and begins to experience rev society and the war from their point of view. He poses as a returnee, one of the very, very few men to come back from the assaults upon the Coalition. This makes "Brother Hyriss" popular to the women he meets on his way to Wystuh, for returnees are given special place in rev society for having been blessed enough to survive the brutal war, including permission to have up to six wives. He sees the strains upon the rev society and economy, and realizes they want a way out of the war as much as the Coalition does; what began as a holy mission against the infidels and "golems" of the Coalition has become a quiet terror and drain upon the Revenants, one that cannot be turned aside from because of its "holy" nature. From this, Trystin devises a way to turn a simple assassination into the end of the war.

Trystin studies the Book of Toren, the rev holy book, and produces a theologically sound means to divert the holy war. He acts and speaks in a manner as might befit an extremely holy man, or even a prophet. Finally, he discovers the systems of the great Temple can be controlled through his implant. During a Ceremony of Remembrance, Trystin gets into the Temple, takes to the pulpit, and proceeds to denounce the war as if speaking for God. He condemns the war for killing people instead of spreading the holy word of Toren to them. Trystin uses a concealed, modified laser to "miraculously" burn his target to death, then makes the Temple's hidden holo systems project an image of his own burning and disappearance as he makes his escape. He rushes out of Wystuh and off Orum itself, getting back to his ship in time to be chased down as a possible Coalition agent. In the hurried escape, he sends his ship slewing sideways just before initiating translation, having heard earlier from Major Freyer that to do so would increase the translation error sevenfold at least.

Trystin arrives, his ship and himself nearly dead, 13 years later in a Farhkan system. The Farhkans take him in after he declares Rhule Ghere as his patron, and restore his body over two years. Part of the process requires inflicting biological immortality upon Trystin, to aid the necessary natural healing processes. After, he returns to base in the Chevel system, to find nearly everything changed.

War has ended, and been replaced with a tense peace. "Brother Hyriss" was named a new prophet, one without his own holy book but with a popular collection of sayings taken from Trystin's few days on Orum. Many of the scriptures had been reexamined, and some even rewritten in light of the message of the new prophet. Trystin has also been promoted twice to Commander in the intervening time, though most had considered it a posthumous promotion. In the meantime, however, Trystin's only surviving relative, his father, has finally died and left the family home to him. He returns home, leaving an invitation to now Commander Freyer to retire and join him.

== Characters ==
- Lieutenant Trystin Desoll
- Elsin Desoll - Trystin's father, a systems engineer
- Nynca Desoll - Trystin's mother, a music teacher
- Salya Desoll - Trystin's sister, a biologist in the Service
- Ulteena Freyer - colleague in the Coalition military through the Maran perimeter and flight training
- James Sasaki - rich scion of the Sasaki arms manufacturers, captain of the Willis
- Rhule Ghere - Farhkan researcher
- Carson Orr - rev intelligence officer

== Societies ==
A large part of Modesitt's science fiction writing involves the construction of future societies, something not neglected in The Parafaith War. He features two major societies, the Coalition and the Revenants. Two others, the Hyndjis and the Argentis, are mentioned briefly but get almost no attention until The Ethos Effect.

=== The Eco-Tech Coalition ===
The Coalition is effectively a protagonist in the book. They combine high technology with extreme ecological awareness, trying to create a society that has power, but also wisdom and self-restraint. Their seminal document is The Eco-Tech Dialogues, a treatise on the ethics and principles of power. The Dialogues are quoted in small excerpts throughout the book. While other societies, like the revs, look at the abundance of resources from controlling dozens of planets, the Coalition holds back from exploiting that bounty. They consistently work to planoform new worlds to Earth-like standards, but their population grows so slowly that they technically already have more than enough worlds to support them. They prefer to be able to spread out, however, to help leave as light an ecological footprint as possible on any given world after planoforming by sharing the load widely.

The population of the Coalition is largely of Asian descent, particularly darker-skinned residents from across southern Asia and many from Japan. The society is fairly Westernized, though with extremely strong Japanese - "parashinto" - influences. Caucasian people, such as the Desolls, are in a very small minority, but some family lines stretch all the way back to the founding of the Coalition. Regardless, as a minority, the Caucasians—especially blond ones like Desoll—are suspected of being Revenants or of having rev sympathies.

=== The Revenants of the Prophet ===
The Revenants are effectively the antagonists in the book. They are less advanced technologically than the Coalition, and in some ways seem hardly advanced beyond the late-20th century Western world except when it comes to the tools of war. An example is when Trystin discovers that they still use petroleum powered automobiles and have ecologically dangerous cattle ranches. They are behind the Coalition in translation technology, and are frequently much more sloppy with the important mass calculations for translation - the troid ships assaulting Mara were often launched at least 20 years before their arrival, in real time. The society is a pervasive theocracy, based around the "revealed word" in the Book of Toren. The society evolved from a union of a fringe Mormon group called the Deseretists, and a white neo-Muslim group called the Mahmetists. They have an extremely high birth rate, following the old Biblical command to "be fruitful and multiply," which causes extensive crowding and a high resource drain on their planets. Following an Islamic and fringe Mormon doctrine allowing polygamy, and promoted due to the deaths of many of their men in the war, those who come back from the war are named patriarchs who can take up to six wives at a time. Women are expected to be subservient wives and mothers, and are so thoroughly socialized toward that goal that many eagerly seek out husbands from among the returnees. While many Coalition characters are baffled as to how a religion based on an unknowable god gained such a foothold, it has had some benefits - social cohesion is high in the rev worlds, with almost no crime at all. They hate the Eco-Tech Coalition because of their religion's demonization of the Eco-Techs and they blame them as the descendants of the immortals whom caused the destruction of Earth.

The population of the revs is largely of Caucasian descent, particularly tall, fair-skinned, and light-haired people. The society is very much based upon the late-20th Century United States, especially in their diet (large amounts of meat and sweets) and economy. They are also obviously based partially on the Mormons, which may be due to familiarity with them from Modesitt's own life in Utah.

=== The Farhkans ===
The Farhkans are almost a complete mystery. They are humanoid, with gray skin and hair, red eyes, greenish crystal-like teeth, and wide, flat noses that are really just an open slit in the face. They either employ neural implants that operate similarly to the Coalition implants, are telepathic, or a combination of the two. Their society is largely unknown, described as "an ultrahigh-tech, self-policing, consensus-based, anarchistic democracy based on environmental understandings and an overall technology that the Eco-Tech Coalition could only drool over from a distance." (p72 of the Tor paperback edition)

Throughout the book, they appear as both studiers and manipulators of humans, particularly Trystin Desoll. Upon attempts to force first contact, they (officially) destroyed one Coalition ship and many, many more rev ships trying to press into their systems. They are now engaged in a strange sort of alliance with the Coalition. It is not a military alliance, for the Farhkans clearly possess overwhelming power in that area. Nor is it a matter of cooperative technological research. Instead, they seem to have latched on to the Coalition as the most ethically "advanced" society of humanity, and therefore most worthy of assisting by sharing technology. They cannot just give out the technology immediately, however, instead sharing it in small portions here and there, and in exchange for seemingly strange and unimportant things. Particularly, they have been researching human biology and have been pestering men and women of the Coalition military about their ethics and the application of their skills and knowledge. They seem to want to be sure that the military, which stands to benefit most from Farhkan technology during a war, is composed of people with the wisdom and restraint to use the Farhkan tech carefully.

== The War ==
The whole book is consumed primarily with the war between the Coalition and the revs. Some characters do not even consider it much of a war, as it involves mostly just the revs throwing troid ships at Coalition systems, and the Coalition breaking up the troids. It seems to be conducted more like a long series of skirmishes. It is a brutal, senseless, and monotonous war of attrition, with the revs hoping to wear the Coalition down with repeating waves of troids and troops, which the Coalition hopes to outlast. With the populations and resources of potentially dozens of worlds on each side, the war is bound to continue interminably before either side is exhausted.

=== Background ===
The precise origins of the war are unknown to readers. Mainly, readers are left with the sense that it has been going on a long time, and will continue to do so. A few major events in the history of the war are mentioned, such as the Harmony Raid, the most successful Coalition raid upon a rev position, which required nearly a year of build-up in the outskirts of a rev system due to translation inaccuracies.

The motives of the revs in prosecuting this war are fairly straightforward: they need living space. Their religion and their society encourage high birth rates and high levels of individual consumption. The Coalition, while not the most vulnerable of targets, has the most and best planets closest to being prepared at any given time. The revs are also able to justify the war religiously in another manner: the Coalition's neural implants. The revs have declared the use of these implants to be abomination and that those who join with machines have become soulless golems. The Book of Toren encourages the elimination of abominations, and so the revs are able to cloak their land-grab in terms of a holy battle between good and evil.

=== Tactics ===
The tactics of the war are fairly simplistic, at least on the large scale.

A typical engagement begins in the outer reaches of a given solar system, where the Coalition is planoforming a world. The revs, back in their own systems, have converted nickel-iron asteroids into great "troid" ships, fitting on engines and digging out enough room for soldiers in cryonic sleep, scout ships, and paragliders. Upon arrival in the system, the troid is pointed at the target planet, and set on its inexorable course.

Coalition ships, usually a mix of large cruisers and smaller corvettes, gather and prepare to strike at the troid as soon as it is within a reasonable range - due to expense and relativistic time dilation problems, the Coalition is usually forced to wait until the troid is dangerously close to the target. Corvettes and cruisers engage the escort of scout ships, which try to provide a screen against the Coalition's troid-buster nuclear torpedoes. All too often, while the Coalition destroys the scouts and the troid, it is not before the troid drops its paragliders full of soldiers and materiel. The gliders, sealed against vacuum, make planetfall beyond the perimeter of the planoformed zone. Because they have almost no energy systems worth speaking of, the gliders are almost invisible to common scanners and must be found and targeted visually. They are usually destroyed only after the soldiers get off with all their materiel.

Out beyond the planoformed zone, the rev soldiers gather and prepare themselves before moving in on the perimeter stations. The stations are powerful defensive posts, armed with lasers, anti-personnel rockets, gatling cannons, and anti-personnel "bomblets" hidden out in the landscape. Around the stations, crackers, turners and other planoforming machines work to constantly extend the range of the planoformed zone. A single Coalition officer on duty can run nearly the whole station through his or her implant, needing only one tech on hand who has the expertise to fix what breaks down.

Most often, the revs simply march toward a station in waves, and are easily mown down by the station's defenses. As of the time of the book, however, they have gotten much more clever and deadly. Some revs have been transformed into living bombs, which they can set off as an act of will or if struck by high-velocity rounds (as out of a gatling cannon). The revs are also employing near-perfect stealth equipment in their suits, making them nearly invisible to scanning and sight in most EM bands. Lastly, they have been bringing down heavy weaponry in the gliders and caching them all along the perimeter.

The Coalition and revs also employ scouts, sending reconnaissance runs into each other's systems, and spies that try to infiltrate each other's societies. Occasionally the Coalition makes raids upon rev positions, but these are few and far between. The Coalition does not have the numbers in both ships and soldiers to match the revs, and their technological advantage does not create a large enough gap to exploit effectively. Both sides also refuse to consider employing weapons of mass destruction upon the other, though it is well within their capabilities. The Coalition cannot ethically support wiping out large numbers of civilians, and the revs will not eliminate such valuable real estate.

=== Social Impact ===
Along with the war itself, Modesitt displays the war's impact upon the two involved societies. Much of the book is spent considering the Coalition perspective and vilifying the revs, though a significant portion near the end grants Trystin and the reader insight into the rev society and what the war has done to them.

==== The Coalition ====
Coalition society demonstrates the least material impact from the war. The Coalition is already very restrained in its consumption, which makes the resource limits upon the people almost negligible for most of the war. It is actually the Coalition military that is often most strained for goods. Translation of excessive mass increases chance of error, meaning goods cannot be ferried in massive amounts to border worlds. Equipment occasionally burns out at perimeter stations and ship techs wait until the last minute to replace failing parts. Rev corpses are even scrounged off the battlefields to be processed into fertilizer and organonutrient, necessary fuel for planet-side Coalition generators since fusion reactors ("fusactors") are forbidden in all but deep space. For food, soldiers are often left consuming Sustain, a nutrient-energy drink made of water and powder mix; algae crackers; and other synthetic materials. Real food is frequently too expensive to translate to border worlds, and a full meal of any quality can easily cost a full week of pay to a soldier. Eventually the war begins to cost the Coalition more, materially, as it presses on. The Coalition economy is very carefully controlled, and Trystin has known the mass transit system of his homeworld to only ever cost two credits to get from the spaceport to home. When he returns home before going off on his intelligence training, he finds the price has climbed sharply, and continues to climb during his short home leave.

The social impact upon the Coalition is greater than the economic impact. This is especially notable for Trystin, for he looks very much like a stereotypical rev. This has always drawn the occasional stare, and has left him having to work just a little bit harder for his advancement. Still, it never inconvenienced his family very much, and he was left certain that the Coalition was more enlightened and tolerant than the revs. This tolerance dissolves as the war presses on, however, especially amongst younger civilians. A park officer falls just short of accusing Trystin and his sister Salya of being rev spies, ignoring their Service identification and the absurdity of using someone who so obviously looks like a rev to infiltrate the Coalition. Later, on leave before his intelligence training, Trystin discovers his mother has died due to the strain of boosting her reflexes and metabolism through her own implant, while protecting a young relative during the first of numerous anti-rev riots on their world. His sister had died in a rev attack not long before. Trystin's father suggests it comes from the roots of Coalition society, which includes environmentalists who refused to consider themselves part of "the problem" in the past, and a strong influence of fairly xenophobic parashinto (Japanese) society. Despite professed tolerance, people have returned to those roots. Politics has become a game of who expresses the most hatred for the Revenants, with nobody willing to take the blame for mismanaging the war or refusing to effectively deal with the problem early on.

==== The Revenants ====
The social impact upon the revs is somewhat higher than the economic impact, though the economic is still notable. The presence of an enemy has not caused the revs to splinter and riot, but instead doggedly stay the course. Still, life is slowly getting worse. The economy is not as strong as it could be. Trystin finds repair shops are doing better business than retailers, because people can no longer afford new goods when the old start to wear out.

Despite the economic costs, the revs have set themselves upon the holy war against the Coalition. To admit the war itself was wrong now means admitting the hierarchy and the belief structure surrounding Toren and the previous Prophets was wrong, something they cannot do. Still, many people wish there was a way to escape the war and still retain the integrity of their faith. Countless young men are sent off to fight the "Ecofreaks," and due to translation error on the troids they may not be seen again for 20 or more years, if they even survive their holy mission. Returned soldiers are named patriarchs, given special privilege in rev society, including the right to multiple wives. Still, there are too few returned to come close to meeting the "demand," and women are finding themselves married frequently to older and older patriarchs, those who get married at all anymore. So many people support the war at all because they have bought completely into the belief that the Coalition is a danger, and that the Ecofreaks would come and eliminate them all or force them to take the abominable implants.

== See also ==
- The Ethos Effect
