= The Forever Hero =

Novel series by L. E. Modesitt, Jr

First trilogy edition (publ. Tor Books) Cover artist: Wayne Barlowe

The Forever Hero is a trilogy of science fiction novels by American writer L. E. Modesitt, Jr. These books were some of the first novels L. E. Modesitt ever published. Like most of his early work, the books are characterised by heavy usage of onomatopoeia, and a tendency to describe the characters by their physical appearance rather than name. The books have been published as both an omnibus and separately. The three novels are Dawn for a Distant Earth (1987), The Silent Warrior (1987), and In Endless Twilight (1988).

In this series, Earth has been destroyed almost totally by overpopulation and the ensuing ecological collapse. Only a fragment of its population survive, and those that survive live in the most primitive conditions. The protagonist, Gerswin, is a primitive, a 'devilkid' who is (inadvertently) captured by the interstellar government and trained in the military. Unique genetic mutations, and the effects of hundreds of years of Natural selection in an exceptionally harsh environment have left Gerswin with exceptional reflexes, enormous physical stamina, as well as, at least initially, a superb memory and incisive intelligence. He is also almost immortal. His goal is to salvage Earth and return it to its primeval state. He eventually does, and in the process, he destroys an interstellar empire, creates the greatest mercantile empire in history, and instigates the development of biological technology.
