= Archform: Beauty =

2002 novel by L. E. Modesitt, Jr.

- First edition
- Author: L. E. Modesitt
- Cover artist: Dave Seeley
- Language: English
- Genre: Science fiction
- Publisher: Tor Books
- Publication date: 2002
- Publication place: United States
- Media type: Print (Paperback)
- Pages: 352
- ISBN: 978-0-7653-0433-9
- OCLC: 48661403
- Dewey Decimal: 813/.54 21
- LC Class: PS3563.O264 A89 2002
- Preceded by: none
- Followed by: Flash

Archform: Beauty is a science fiction novel by American writer L. E. Modesitt, published in 2002. It is set in 24th century Earth.

== Reception ==
Roland Green in his review for Booklist said that "Modesitt creates exceptionally vivid but the narrative continuum somewhat hard to get into. Ultimately most readers will probably be absorbed in the book and glad that the ending doesn't preclude further stories in its setting". Kirkus Reviews wrote that "Modesitt's always worth reading, but this may well be his best ever." Peter Cannon in his review for Publishers Weekly said that "set against a background of biological terrorism, Modesitt's tale explores social issues (only the rich can afford privacy as well as injections of microscopic, medical robots to stay healthy) sure to resonate with many readers. This brilliant novel is as thought provoking as it is entertaining."
