= The Ethos Effect =

2003 novel by L E. Modesitt, Jr

- Author: L. E. Modesitt, Jr.
- Language: English
- Series: The Parafaith War
- Genre: Science fiction
- Publisher: Tor
- Publication date: October 2003
- Publication place: United States
- Media type: Print (Hardcover, Paperback)
- Pages: 509
- ISBN: 0-7653-0802-9 (first edition, hardback)
- OCLC: 53112614
- Dewey Decimal: 813/.54 22
- LC Class: PS3563.O264 E84 2003
- Preceded by: The Parafaith War

The Ethos Effect (2003) is a science fiction novel by American writer L. E. Modesitt, Jr., a sequel to The Parafaith War. It is set in a future where humanity has spread to the stars and divided into several factions. Many factions including the Eco-Tech Coalition, the Revenants of the Prophet ("revs") and the Taran Empire are engaged in escalating conflict over territory and their competing social philosophies. Against this background, former Taran Empire officer Van C. Albert is recruited by the mysterious Trystin Desoll to work for the equally mysterious Integrated Information Systems.

While this novel shares many themes that can be found in other novels by Modesitt, The Ethos Effect adds elements of Societal Ethics rather than only involving personal ethics. This is one of the only books written by Modesitt where a person enacts major political and structural changes in the culture into which the protagonist was raised.

== Literary significance and reception ==
Jackie Cassada in her review for The Library Journal called this novel a "fast-paced yet complexly plotted work of military sf portrays three-dimensional characters caught up in internal and external battles as they search for ways to combine personal integrity with their professional duties. A thoughtfully written, hard-hitting tale that belongs in most collections." Peter Cannon in his review for Publishers Weekly said that "despite some expository lumps and wooden characterization, thoughtful SF readers will appreciate this weighty tale of humanitarian intentions and social speculations." Frieda Murray reviewing for Booklist said "Modesitt knows well how to keep this kind of soup at a boil."

== See also ==
- The Parafaith War
