= Spellsong Cycle =

Book series by L. E. Modesitt Jr.

The Spellsong Cycle is a fantasy series written by L. E. Modesitt Jr. Set in the fictional world of Erde, it is notable for its system of magic, based on music and song.

The main character of the first three books of the series is Anna Marshall, a middle-aged music instructor and small-time opera singer who is magically transported from Ames, Iowa to Erde, a fantastical world where songs have a magical power, and where she has the capability to become one of the most powerful sorceresses in the world. The following books center around the actions of Secca, her adopted daughter twenty years later.

It has been described as "feminist fantasy", and compared favorably against The Saga of Recluce series of novels by Modesitt, his best known works. The system of song-based magic is similar to that seen in the earlier Spellsinger Cycle by Alan Dean Foster.

== Books ==
- The Soprano Sorceress (1997)

Anna Marshall is transported from her life in modern Iowa, to the medieval world of Erde. On Earth, Anna was a classical singer and professor of music. On Erde, singing is a rare skill, whose only use is sorcery. She must find a place for herself and learn sorcery before she is destroyed by powerful leaders who fear her. The society is intensely patriarchal, even misogynistic. As an unmarried woman who wants to remain independent, she is opposed by various male and female characters. She also finds allies, again from both genders. With each of her successes, the stakes get higher. Her arrival coincided with invasions by neighbouring countries. Anna's role becomes decisive in these wars.

- The Spellsong War (1998)

Anna is now regent for the young heir to the kingdom of Defalk. The society is feudal and patriarchal and, as a female head of state, Anna is reviled by many, inside and outside of Defalk. She uses diplomacy where she can, and force of arms (and war sorcery) when she cannot. She begins to build national infrastructure (river bridges, postal mail, tax accounting, a school for noble heirs). When possible, she tries to improve the lot of the commoners, especially of women. Her innovations are often opposed and her successes often backfire. She defends her kingdom from treachery by her country's nobles, from peasant revolt, and from foreign invasion. Her sorcery becomes ever more powerful but at increasing personal cost.

- Darksong Rising (1999)

Anna is a powerful sorceress on the continent. She is, again, subduing rebellious Defalkan lords and hostile neighbouring countries. Out of necessity, she acts ruthlessly, eventually levelling an entire city. She suffers from self-questioning and from the after-effects of sorcery. At the end, she finds an uneasy peace with the neighbouring countries, and her nation-building efforts bring prosperity to her subjects. She must remain vigilant, and she can never return to her children on Earth, but she makes a life for herself on Erde that includes a little happiness.

- The Shadow Sorceress (2001)

For decades, Anna was a source of stability, propping up the (now adult) king. She regularly used sorcery to eliminate opponents covertly. Anna trained her adopted daughter, Secca, and created an official position for Secca as a sorceress to the kingdom. Upon Anna's death, those who opposed her reforms seize the initiative. For Secca, losing Anna is very painful but matters unravel with frightening speed. To survive, and to preserve the society which Anna molded, Secca must fill Anna's shoes. As the story progresses, Secca matures and her self-confidence grows. She draws on Anna's teaching, discovering deeper meanings. She subdues rebellion, defeats new external enemies, and defends her position as Anna's heir. In so doing, she experiences the same dilemmas which Anna did, decades earlier.

- Shadowsinger (2002)

Secca faces the ultimate enemy: an island nation of misogynist sorcerers, who have been instigating much of the strife on Erde, since before Anna's time. Secca acts boldly. She takes the fight to them and reduces their entire country to ashes, killing off most of the population.
