= Flash (Modesitt novel) =

2004 novel by L. E. Modesit

- Author: L. E. Modesitt Jr.
- Language: English
- Genre: Science fiction
- Publisher: Tor Books
- Publication date: 2004
- Publication place: United States
- Media type: Print (Paperback)
- Pages: 518
- ISBN: 0-7653-1128-3
- OCLC: 55096900
- Dewey Decimal: 813/.54 22
- LC Class: PS3563.O264 F58 2004
- Preceded by: Archform: Beauty

Flash is a science fiction novel by American writer L. E. Modesitt Jr., published in 2004.

== Plot introduction ==
Flash is set in a future Earth of the 22nd century, chronologically prior to its published predecessor Archform: Beauty. Humanity is still recovering from environmental disasters of the 21st century, but technology provides enough material resources for everyone. Earth's old nations have merged into continental governments - such as NorAm, United Europe, and Sinoplex - many of which are partially or wholly under the sway of various multinational corporations. Various wars are in progress, including an independence movement of colonists on Mars.

The protagonist is Jonat DeVrai, a talented market research consultant and former Marine Corps officer who happens to have retained nanite combat enhancements that should be removed from retiring soldiers. As usual in Modesitt's books, DeVrai does not seek power; he is forced to exercise it because of others' attempts to use him in their designs to gather power to themselves.

In addition to normal humans, the world of Flash also includes:

- Ascendants: upper-class people who were genetically improved as zygotes. Tall, attractive, and well-to-do, Ascendants disproportionately hold positions of power.
- Cydroids: non-sentient constructs made from cloned human tissue. They are operated by telepresence and often contain technological enhancements.

== Summary ==
After obtaining the rank of Lt. Col in the NorAm Marines, Jonat DeVrai resigns his commission after growing disenchanted with the realities of warfare for economic gains. Using his military benefits, DeVrai begins a new career and obtains an advanced degree and creates a more accurate model for measuring the effects of "prod-placement."

DeVrai's practice for ethical, high caliber assessments brings him to the attention of the Centre for Societal Research, a generally nonpartisan research group. The Centre commissions a study regarding potential abuses of "prod-placement" techniques in political campaigns.

While the study is intended to be used by the leaders of some of the top Multis (companies), attempts on DeVrai's life and the murder of his sister and her husband, force DeVrai to risk his life in an effort to set things right.

DeVrai receives help in the form of the self-aware Cy-droid Paula Anthane and the shadowy force behind Central Four.

DeVrai has become a pawn on more than one chessboard.

Will he have the chance to set things right? Will he be able to avenge the murder of his sister that left his niece and nephew orphans, or will the multiple plots to remove DeVrai from the board finally catch up to him?

== Themes ==
Many themes are touched upon in the book - artificial intelligence, product placement, the nature of self-consciousness, the use of clones as remote-controlled robots and the ethical implications thereof, subliminal influencing, and the knotty relationship between following the law and doing what's right.

Struggles for control and power dominate the book. The story combines sometimes violent action with character interactions. The hero's struggle to parent his children while at the same time engineering the violent demise of the antagonists provides much of the novel's tension.

== Reception ==
Frieda Murray in her review for Booklist praised the novel calling it "a marvelous thriller that plausibly extrapolates from current possibilities in IT, AI, media, and crime, it also constitutes the way for newcomers to get acquainted with Modesitt—at his best." Kirkus Reviews was also positive about the novel saying "Modesitt's abundant novelistic virtues--great characters and plotting, impressive attention to detail--aside: this is smart, aware, provocative, and engrossing on several political, economic, and professional levels." Publishers Weekly said "Modesitt strives for emotional rather than intellectual satisfaction. His future has much eye-pleasing chrome, but it lacks infrastructure, making the book seem more contemporary techno-thriller than SF (parents queuing up in hydrogen-powered cars to pick up their kids after school)."
