= The Saga of Recluce =

Fantasy novel series by L. E. Modesitt, Jr.

- First edition of the series
- Author: L. E. Modesitt Jr.
- Cover artist: Darrell K. Sweet
- Country: United States
- Language: English
- Genre: High fantasy
- Published: 1991–present
- Media type: Print (hardback & paperback) audiobook

The Saga of Recluce is a series of fantasy novels written by L. E. Modesitt Jr. The initial novel in the series, The Magic of Recluce, was published in 1991. The series is still in publication with the latest novel published in June 2026. In 2015 Modesitt stated that the (then) 20 novels in the Recluce series had sold nearly three million copies.

The 26 books of the series describe the changing, often confrontational, relationship between the descendants of two technologically advanced cultures, representatives of whom have been marooned on a sparsely inhabited world and regressed to the level of the existing inhabitants' primitive technology. Themes of gender stereotyping, sexism, ageism, racism, ethics, economics, environmentalism and politics are explored in the course of the series, which examines the world through the eyes of its protagonists.

The series is published outside of internal chronological order. The first book published in the series occurs near the end of the overall story, with subsequent books jumping further into the past to expand on elements of history. The author recommends reading the books in publication order. As of the novel Overcaptain, the saga covers 10 different time periods and 12 major story lines. The stories demonstrate the progression of real-life events into myth and legend over the progression of centuries, as the characters in one book will be known as heroes or mythical figures in other, chronologically later books. Additionally, certain characters appear in multiple books, the protagonists in one novel, appearing as a supporting characters in others.

Within the Recluce universe, all matter has inherent properties called "order" and "chaos". Magic manifests as a person's ability to manipulate these properties through thought. The feats which are feasible depend on the user's (genetically limited) potential, on developing those abilities, and on the laws that govern the interaction and balance between the two forces in nature. Generally, those who manipulate order are called (black) mages. Those who manipulate chaos are called (white) wizards. Rare individuals (grays) can manipulate both. There are personal costs to using magic, both immediate and long term.

== Publishing history ==
The novels were not published in the order in which events occurred in-universe. This table provides both the publication order and the in-universe chronological order (Recluce Year). The author has stated that publication order is the appropriate reading order.

Publishing history
# (Note: Publication order)	Release Year	Recluce Year	Title	Pages (Note: From the first hardback edition)	Words	ISBN	Main Characters
1	1991	2250	The Magic of Recluce	501	160,166	0-8125-0518-2 (US paperback), 1-85723-201-1 (UK paperback)	Lerris
2	1992	1300	The Towers of the Sunset	359	151,510	0-8125-1967-1 (US paperback), 1-85723-230-5 (UK paperback)	Creslin
3	1994	1600	The Magic Engineer	617	201,259	0-8125-3405-0 (US paperback), 1-85723-272-0 (UK paperback)	Dorrin
4	1995	2050	The Order War	479	184,912	0-8125-3404-2 (US paperback), 1-85723-377-8 (UK paperback)	Justen
5	1995	2255	The Death of Chaos	479	211,297	0-8125-4824-8 (US paperback), 1-85723-386-7 (UK paperback)	Lerris
6	1996	801	Fall of Angels	446	182,708	0-8125-3895-1 (US paperback)	Ryba, Nylan
7	1997	803	The Chaos Balance	446	184,887	0-8125-7130-4 (US paperback)	Nylan, Ayrlyn
8	1998	1590	The White Order	381	146,332	0-8125-4171-5 (US paperback)	Cerryl
9	1999	1605	Colors of Chaos	534	253,626	0-8125-7093-6 (US paperback)	Cerryl
10	2001	410	Magi'i of Cyador	544	168,224	0-8125-7948-8 (US paperback)	Lorn
11	2001	418	Scion of Cyador	640	212,337	0-8125-8926-2 (US paperback)	Lorn
12	2004	2110	The Wellspring of Chaos	400	137,883	0-7653-4808-X (US paperback)	Kharl
13	2005	2112	Ordermaster	496	178,297	0-7653-5089-0 (US paperback)	Kharl
14	2007	1900	Natural Ordermage	496	180,902	0-7653-1813-X (US paperback)	Rahl
15	2008	1903	Mage-Guard of Hamor	624	220,383	0-7653-1927-6 (US hardback)	Rahl
16	2010	815	Arms-Commander	528	185,748	0-7653-6353-4 (US paperback)	Saryn
17	2014	825	Cyador's Heirs	512	193,600	0-7653-7478-1 (US paperback)	Lerial.
18	2014	833	Heritage of Cyador	528	192,771	0-7653-8190-7 (US paperback)	Lerial.
19	2017	1075	The Mongrel Mage	560		0-7653-9468-5 (US hardback)	Beltur
20	2018	1076	Outcasts of Order	640		1-2501-7255-1 (US Hardback)	Beltur
21	2019	1077	The Mage-Fire War	512		1-2502-0782-7 (US Hardback)	Beltur
22	2021	1093	Fairhaven Rising	536		9781250265197 (US Hardback)	Taelya, Beltur's adopted niece
23	2024	92	From the Forest	464		9781250877284 (US Hardback)	Alyiakal
24	2024	101	Overcaptain	496		9781250902900 (US Hardback)	Alyiakal
25	2025	103	Sub-Majer's Challenge	448		9781250326829 (US Hardback)	Alyiakal
26	2026	104	Last of the First				Alyiakal

=== Collections ===
- Recluce Tales (3 January 2017)

== Plot ==
=== Setting ===
All of the novels take place in the same fantasy universe, spanning a time period of over two thousand years. The chronology starts in Year 1, which is the founding of Cyad.*

Within this universe, all matter is aligned with two competing forces: order and chaos. In their natural state, these forces are equally matched, in a condition called Balance. These two forces can be seen as fantasy representations of the natural entropy (chaos) that occurs in matter, balanced by the various molecular forces (order) that bind matter into structured forms. These forces are understood, at a basic level, by all inhabitants of the world. The colour white is identified with chaos; black with order. The first published novel explains it this way: white is the chaotic combination of all wavelengths of visible light, while black is the absence of this light. The extreme of either is undesirable...for a human, perfect chaos is destruction, perfect order is death.

Rare individuals within the universe possess the inborn ability to manipulate these forces. White wizards can draw chaos from a surrounding area and focus it into bolts of flame. Black mages can concentrate order into matter, making it unnaturally strong.

A more limited "subclass" of black mage which is generally acceptable, even highly desirable, even in white chaos dominated societies is the healer. Both forces can be used to kill or to shield. Both types of wielders can, to a degree, detect the presence of both forces. People who are being deceptive, infections, and toxins emanate chaos of differing types discernible by a trained wielder.

Openly gray mages are extremely rare. They manipulate both order and chaos. They are among the most powerful characters in the series. They can prolong their lives and perform awesome magical feats. It is hinted that some black mages could have become gray if they had decided to, and many of the white wizards are implied to be secretly gray, and they may not even be aware of this. "Grays" can choose the lifestyle of a Druid. Druids live in seclusion and are far less known, most in the Great Forest of Naclos. They exercise magic differently.

Part of the plot in each novel involves protagonists discovering novel ways to wield chaos and order. Individuals vary significantly in innate magical strength and in skill at wielding it. They improve through exerting themselves through practice, developing new techniques via personal experimentation, and by studying written lore (which is scant and cryptic).

The manipulation of chaos comes at a price: over time, it can permeate a wizard, accelerating the deterioration of everything around him or her (example: wine turning to vinegar almost before the wizard can drink it). Those wizards who channel chaos through their bodies (nearly all of them) have short lifespans, inversely proportional to the amount of chaos they raise. Some have found ways to reduce this effect. Additionally, any living being that is exposed to much chaos (such as the inhabitants of Fairhaven) experiences a burning sensation upon touching an ordered object, akin to touching an extremely cold object. The effect's severity is proportional to the accumulated chaos. For White Wizards, the result is often death.

The manipulation of order has costs too. Wielding it carelessly can drain a mage of the order needed to sustain life (example: absent-mindedly stroking one's wooden staff). Exceptional mages in the series discover ways to use order to funnel chaos, working around their inability to manipulate chaos directly. This is effective in combat but these actions backlash on the wielder because death itself releases chaos. The unleashed chaos harms the mage. It can cause disorientation, even sensory deprivation, for timespans proportional to the amount of destruction.

The original wielders of magic were marooned on the world of Recluce from another universe, where they were space-farers engaged in a protracted war, and most of the novels take place long after these arrivals, however, Fall of Angels does provide a brief glimpse into that other universe. The reader first discovers this through quotes and legends peppered throughout the series. The preexisting native population had developed something approximating medieval technology. The new arrivals could not keep their technology operational, but found the same skill with which they interfaced with their ship, allowed them to manipulate latent forces within the new world.

The ancestors of the people who would rule empires powered and dominated by white chaos were stranded first, they were the Rationalists (aka "Rats", or "Demons"). They would found an empire, Cyador, that would destroy the majority of the Great Forest, what they call The Accursed Forest, enclosing the remainder inside a great wall, and dominated the West of the continent of Candar. This empire would be patriarchal and could be oppressive to women in varying degrees through its history, but a genteel and paternal sort of oppression, in contrast to the "native" misogynists, who are more predatory and crude.

The ancestors of those who would predominantly wield black order known as Angels, were marooned 800 years later (Fall of Angels takes place in year A.F 801), and would found two authoritarian, militaristic, matriarchal, vaguely misandrist states on Candar and generally fought native opponents rather than their Rationalist counterparts. The series is named for a black order-based island state which was founded by two powerful individuals from those states, abandoning the matriarchy and vague misandry in favor of a more modern (but not fully) outlook. However it does evolve an intolerance for anything that threatens its highly successful order-based homogeneity, banishing anyone they believe to be undesirable, chaos wielders and those unwilling or unable to fit in to Recluce society alike.

The technology, weaponry, and ideology of each culture is reflected in the magical abilities, hair colour, and world views of their descendants in the Recluce universe. Offspring can usually inherit magical abilities, and talent for both black order and white chaos appeared in the descendants of both groups, although one was generally favored over the other, if the other wasn't oppressed or shunned.

The arrival of the Angels is described in Fall of Angels: a space warship, the Winterlance, is part of an Angel fleet attacking a Rationalist blockade. The Angels are losing. During the battle, an event occurs: energy weapons of opposite types align and focus on the Winterlance. The result is that instead of being destroyed, the ship materializes elsewhere. From various evidence, the crew concludes that they are in an alternate universe, ruled by different physical laws. The ship no longer functions but it is close to a habitable planet, and the crew crash lands there. Soon, individuals discover strange talents and physical changes (such as hair colour) that will ultimately become linked to order magic. Upon contacting the planet's locals, they discover that Rationalists are also present on the planet.

=== Chronology ===
Chronologically, the series spans 2,255 years. (Note: Chronology as of 2023) The story actually begins well before even the earliest novel, with the arrival of the "demons of light" from another universe. Using their manifest chaos powers as well as their advanced technology, these people create an empire called Cyador, on the continent of Candar. While the series is named after Recluce, that island is uninhabited for the first millennium of the story.

The first two books as of 2024, chronologically, are From the Forest and Overcaptain, which describe the operation of the Cyador army and its battles against the natives of Candar. These novels, together with Magi'i of Cyador and Scion of Cyador, primarily serve to flesh out a formerly unknown part of the history of the universe. The story does establish one key element in the history of Cyador: the ultimate decline of the advanced technology of the Rationalists. Initially, upon landing on a mostly-uninhabited part of one of the world's continents, the Rationalists (later known as Demons) managed to create a number of advanced mechanical devices, powered by chaos. They also erected a number of collection towers that were used to focus chaos into these devices. By the time of the first novel, these towers are failing, and the empire is losing the ability to maintain its advanced technology. The opening of Magi'i of Cyador was once considered "Year 1" in the history of Recluce, as no years are given in the text of the book, but was later made year 410 by the author, with the founding of Cyad given as the start of the calendar. Per the table above, the first stories in the latest series date from year 92-104. Modesitt has stated in an interview that he does not intend to add any earlier stories.

The Fall of Angels, 800 years later, details the arrival of the Angels and the founding of the female-dominated city of Westwind. Unlike the Demons, the Angels manipulate order. Of note are two specific angels, Nylan and Ryba, who would become legendary figures in coming novels. Ryba develops a talent for prophecy. Her extensive writings are quoted by future generations as The Book of Ryba, while Nylan develops the foundations of order magic. Nylan also fathers the child Weryl. In The Chaos Balance, Nylan leaves Westwind for a more direct confrontation with Cyador. By this time, the fire-wagons and fire-lances that were once central to the empire have vanished, and the empire is fully dependent on its chaos wizards. The ultimate result of this confrontation is the founding of the Druids, which take up residence in a magically active forest called The Accursed Forest by the natives, but The Great Forest of Naclos in later generations.

Set ten years after the events in The Chaos Balance, Arms-Commander follows the story of Saryn, the head of the guards of Westwind. She tries to protect Westwind, as political and military problems build in the surrounding countries of Gallos, Lornth, and Suthya. In this novel, characters indicate that almost 10 generations have passed since the reign of Lorn in Cyador.

Decades after the fall of Cyador, Cyador's Heirs finds its survivors have reestablished themselves in Cigoerne, a fertile country coveted by hostile neighbors in less hospitable lands. Young Lerial, the second son of Duke Kiedron, lives in the shadow of his older brother Lephi, the heir to their father's realm. Lerial's future seems preordained: He will one day command his brother's forces in defense of Cigoerne, serving at his older sibling's pleasure and no more. But when Lerial is sent abroad to be fostered by Major Altyrn to learn the skills and wisdom he will need to fulfill his future duties, he begins a journey into a much larger world that brings out his true potential. Lerial has talents that few, as yet, suspect: he is one of those rare beings who can harness both Order and Chaos, the competing natural forces that shape the world and define the magic that exists within it. And as war finally engulfs the fringes of Cigoerne, Lerial's growing mastery of Order and Chaos is tested to its limits and his own.

Generations after the Angels reshaped the political climate in central Candar, the Prefect of Gallos seeks for an excuse to start another war with Westwind in the opening of The Mongrel Mage. The Prefect sends three white mages with an escort to investigate 'raids' in the bordering plains between the two powers. Those mages are Beltur, his prominent white mage uncle, and his uncle's apprentice. After their findings displease the Prefect and his high mages, Beltur's uncle sacrifices himself so the young man can flee. With the aid of Jessyla, a young healer, Beltur travels to Elparta in Spidlar alongside a black mage named Athaal. Beltur, always considered weak as a white mage, is revealed to be a black, or possibly gray, mage. In Elparta he increases his skills in order magic, finds works serving in the city patrol and helping a coppersmith forge cupridium, and strives to recover from the turmoil of Gallos. Soon, however, he discovers he cannot escape his past, as the Prefect and his white mages decide to conquer Elparta with their powerful army. Recruited into Elparta's defense, Beltur excels as an arms-mage, bolstered by his desire to defend his new home and its people which now includes Jessyla, her mother, and many other recent friends. The victory of Elparta is marred by the loss of Athaal who Beltur was unable to save in battle. In Outcasts of Order Beltur attempts to return to his daily routine immediately after the war with Gallos but intrigue among the Trader's Council and the local group of black mages removes any chance he has to make Elparta his permanent home. He begins to train the young daughter of a black mage who is destined to be a powerful chaos wielder. Forced to flee after defending himself and his coppersmith partner from two murderous black mages, Beltur travels to Axalt as the request of the smith and with Jessyla as his new consort. Adjusting to a new life in Axalt grows increasingly complicated as once again the powerful are threatened by his presence. When his white mage apprentice and her family are exiled from Elparta they seek refuge with Beltur in Axalt. Despite assistance from the coppersmith's family Beltur, Jessyla and their guests are barely able to secure permission to stay. When he is unable to prevent a murder, Beltur tries to enact some justice for it, but ultimately is forced out of another city. Remembering an invitation from a mysterious trader in Montgren, Beltur and Jessyla travel with the young white mage and her family to the small duchy to seek a better life. Surviving bandit raids and surveying local power structures along the way, Beltur's followers arrive in Montgren to find themselves not only welcome, but expected. The Duchess offers them an enticing prospect - they can become the new council for a practically abandoned town, making it a home shaped in their own image. Beltur accepts and pledges to manage the town, Haven, as a place where mages of both chaos and order will be welcome.

500 years after the arrival of the Angels, in The Towers of Sunset, Cyador is long gone. But, half-way across the continent of Candar, towards the East, is Fairhaven: a city-state ruled by an oligarchy of white wizards. Their prejudices and their written history imply that Fairhaven was founded by descendants of Cyador. Westwind is the bulwark of the matriarchal societies of Western Candar which hold to the Legend of Ryba. Westwind is under threat from the white wizards of the city of Fairhaven, which exerts a great deal of influence over the male-dominated lands of Eastern Candar. A very strong order mage, Creslin, who is suggested to be the son of Weryl and grandson of the first "black mage" Nylan, flees female-dominated Westwind prior to an arranged marriage, only to be pursued by the white wizards who fear his strength. He ultimately escapes Candar, having married a chaos wizard in the process, and sails to the uninhabited island of Recluce. Here, Creslin begins a society based entirely on order magic. We also begin to learn the dangers of widespread order or chaos magic, as Creslin's unskilled efforts to make Recluce habitable cause severe weather elsewhere in the world, including massive storms, hurricanes, floods and droughts.

Several hundred years later, the chaos wizards in Candar have managed to conquer almost the entire continent. Beginning in the year 1590, The White Order and Colors of Chaos depict the progress of a young chaos wizard named Cerryl as he rises in the ranks of the white wizards. He is constantly fending off attempts on his life from the extremely powerful wizard Jeslek, who has begun to literally raise mountains from the ground to protect the paved highways the chaos wizards have been creating across Candar. At the same time, in the year 1600, The Magic Engineer details the journey of Dorrin, an order mage from Recluce. This is the point, both chronologically and to the reader, where the importance of balance between chaos and order starts to become apparent. (There are some hints in this regard in the first novel, but here the underlying causes are explained more fully.) Creslin's attempts to focus order around Recluce have led to an abundance of "free chaos" elsewhere in the world. This has led to increasingly stronger chaos wizards, ultimately leading to the formation of a 'chaos-focus' in the wizard Jeslek, granting him extraordinary strength. This, in turn, is allowing more order to be focused in Recluce, until something catastrophic happens to reset the balance.

Dorrin begins using order magic with his engineering talent to create steam-powered machines from order-infused wood and metal. These are capable of containing large amounts of chaos energy. Of particular note are the extremely fast and powerful warships that Recluce begins to build, after Dorrin demonstrates their usefulness. The vast amount of order concentrated in these ships will accelerate the growth of chaos in the world. Dorrin spends some time in Candar fighting off the white wizards, then returns to Recluce to become a first "order engineer" and founds what later becomes the major city on Recluce, named after Nylan from "The Fall of Angels". Meanwhile, Jeslek is ultimately destroyed in his confrontation with Dorrin, leading to Cerryl becoming High Wizard and attempting some measure of truce with Recluce.

In 1900, the story continues with Natural Ordermage and Mage-Guard of Hamor. It deals with the familiar motif of exile for a budding mage as yet unable and/or unwilling to control his newfound powers, this time on the continent-country of Hamor. The switch (which is a Modesitt trademark) from a pro-Recluce viewpoint to one inside the heretofore vilified Hamorian empire provides a probing look at prejudice, and also lays bare the conflict and corruption within the Recluce society and organizations at that time. Rahl, an apprentice scrivener with no taste for responsibility or accountability, is discovered by the magisters of Recluce to have an inordinately strong grasp of certain order abilities. As their methods are not suited to instruct one such as him he is exiled to Hamor. Caught in the middle of a conspiracy immediately after his arrival, Rahl soon finds himself in the infamous penal ironworks of Luba only to escape them when his abilities surface. As a mage-guard of the Empire he finds himself forced to become more than he was in order to survive first as a patroller and then as an officer in an army during a civil war.

After centuries of relative peace, in 2050, The Order War depicts the progress of two order mages from Recluce, Justen and Gunnar, as they attempt to defend the last free country in Candar from the white wizards, who have begun to use order-based soldiers to add to their own defense while simultaneously increasing their own chaos powers by increasing the amount of order in the world, as according to the plans of Cerryl from The White Order and Colors of Chaos. During their journey, Justen transitions himself into a gray mage, and is ultimately driven into the forest of Naclos, where he becomes a Druid. We also meet several legendary figures, including Ayrlyn (the wife of Nylan and one of the original angels) and the still alive Weryl, and learn how the Druids' mastery of both order and chaos has enabled them to keep their bodies alive for thousands of years. Justen leaves the forest and returns to fight the chaos wizards, and uses his newfound knowledge of order and chaos balance mastery to form a tremendous weapon. This weapon unleashes the apocalyptic event that has been building for centuries, drawing on vast amounts of both order and chaos to utterly destroy the chaos wizards' capital city and kill nearly all of the powerful chaos wizards in the process. The result of this is a dramatic reduction in both free order and free chaos in the world.

Another diversionary storyline begins in 2110, with Wellspring of Chaos and Ordermaster depicting the life of an unlikely mage named Kharl. This storyline (which spans the continents of Nordla and Austra) tells the story of Kharl's transition from cooper to order-mage. Kharl becomes a powerful self-taught order-mage, an unlikely hero, and reputedly the most powerful black mage outside of Recluce during this time period. The two books flesh out the resistance of Nordla and Austra to the Empire of Hamor's attempts to expand their influence on the two continents. Notable characters from previous books of the series make brief appearances, including the gray wizard Justen. The two books flesh out two of the areas of the world that were mostly ignored in earlier novels and provides insight into the evolution of the Empire of Hamor, which plays a prominent part at the end of the series.

The final part of the saga occurs in the year 2250 and begins with The Magic of Recluce. Gunnar, who has kept himself and his family alive using druidic techniques taught by his brother Justen, sends his son Lerris (who is unaware of his father's history and his own magical potential) to Candar to undertake a rite of passage commonly administered to dissatisfied individuals living in Recluce, especially those who have an affinity or ability for either order or chaos. While exiled to Candar, Lerris meets his uncle Justen, and comes to understand his father's ulterior motives for sending him off. Centuries of dominance by Recluce and their order engineers has once again led to increasingly more powerful chaos wizards in Candar, with one in particular threatening to cause trouble on the scale of the white council. Gunnar has sent Lerris to Candar with the suspicion that a strong order mage and strong chaos wizard will ultimately be drawn into direct conflict, and that Lerris would take care of the problem without Recluce being directly involved. Lerris ultimately defeats the white wizard and settles down in Candar to live as a woodworker.

The climax of the story, 5 years later, in The Death of Chaos sees the powerful Empire of Hamor, the oldest inhabited continent in the world, has been using the relative instability of the rest of the world to build weapons using bound order, building an enormous fleet of steel warships armed with powerful cannons. In the final climactic battle on the shores of Recluce, Lerris and his family use their mastery of order and chaos to forcibly impose a balance on the world, unleashing vast amounts of subterranean lava directly into the ocean beneath the invading Hamorian forces. In the end, Lerris uses the vast amounts of order in Recluce to bind all of the free chaos into small, balanced units (again, strongly reminiscent of particle physics). The result is the destruction of nearly all of the order and chaos magic in the world, including Lerris's family (which was being kept alive by magic) and even parts of the continent of Recluce itself.

The book introduces the character of Lerris - a wielder of earth-shaking magical power, yet whose vocation and interest is woodworking and creating intricate pieces of furniture with material tools and wit no use of magic. At the concluding scene of the book - and so far, of the entire series - Lerris, deeply scarred from the final cataclysmic battle, is happy to leave magic behind him and settle into the life of a skilled craftsman.
