= L. E. Modesitt Jr. =

American science fiction and fantasy writer (born 1943)

Leland Exton Modesitt Jr.
- Modesitt at CONduit 16 (2006) in Salt Lake City, Utah.
- Born: 1943 (age 82–83); Denver, Colorado, U.S.
- Education: Williams College
- Occupations: Consultant; writer; poet
- Writing career
- Genres: Fantasy, Science fiction
- Website: www.lemodesittjr.com

Leland Exton Modesitt Jr. (/ˈmɒdɪsɪt/; born 1943) is an American science fiction and fantasy author who has written over 80 novels. He is best known for the fantasy series The Saga of Recluce. By 2015, the 18 novels in the Recluce series had sold nearly three million copies. By 2025, there were 25 Recluce novels.

In addition to his novels, Modesitt has published technical studies and articles, columns, poetry, and a number of science fiction stories. His first short story, "The Great American Economy", was published in 1973 in Analog Science Fiction and Science Fact. In 2008, he published his first collection of short stories, Viewpoints Critical: Selected Stories (Tor Books, 2008).

Modesitt was the Writer Guest of Honor at Balticon 58, held from May 24 to 27, 2024.

== Early life ==
Modesitt was born in Denver, Colorado. He graduated from Williams College in Massachusetts and lived in Washington, D.C. for almost 20 years while working as a political writer.

He has worked as a Navy pilot, lifeguard, delivery boy, unpaid radio disc jockey, real estate agent, market research analyst, director of research for a political campaign, legislative assistant for a Congressman, staff director for another, Director of Legislation and Congressional Relations for the United States Environmental Protection Agency, a consultant on environmental, regulatory, and communications issues, and a college lecturer and writer in residence.

== Approach to writing ==
Modesitt has stated, "When all the research, all the writing group support, all the cheerleading, and all the angst fade away, and they should, the bottom line is simple: As a writer, you first must entertain your readers. To keep them beyond a quick and final read, you have to do more than that, whether it's to educate them, make them feel, anger them by challenging their preconceptions—or all of that and more. But if you don't entertain first, none of what else you do matters, because they won't stay around."

== Bibliography ==
Major series

- The Saga of Recluce (1991–present)
- Spellsong Cycle (1997–2002)
- The Forever Hero (1987–1988)
- The Corean Chronicles (2002–2011)
- The Imager Portfolio (2009–2019)
- The Grand Illusion (2021–present)

== Personal life ==
He met his current wife, Carol A. Modesitt, after moving to New Hampshire in 1989. Carol has worked as a professional opera singer and has been a professor and opera director at Southern Utah University since 1993. They relocated to Cedar City, Utah, in 1993.

He has been married three times and has six daughters and two sons.
