= List of fantasy novels =

This article lists notable fantasy novels (and novel series). The books appear in alphabetical order by title (ignoring "A", "An", and "The"); series are alphabetical by author-designated name or, if there is no such, some reasonable designation. Science-fiction novels and short-story collections are not included here.

== A ==
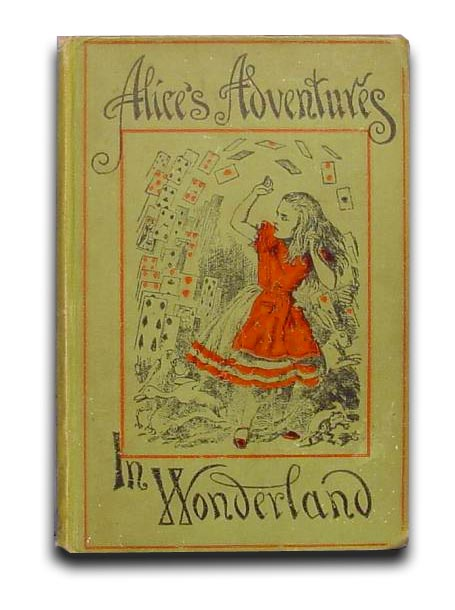

- Abhorsen Trilogy by Garth Nix
- Acacia: The War With The Mein by David Anthony Durham
- Adam Binder series by David R. Slayton
- Aegypt series by John Crowley
- Akata Witch by Nnedi Okorafor
- Akata Warrior by Nnedi Okorafor
- Aladore by Henry Newbolt
- Alice's Adventures in Wonderland by Lewis Carroll
- Alphabet of Thorn by Patricia McKillip
- The Tales of Alvin Maker series by Orson Scott Card
- An Ember in the Ashes series by Sabaa Tahir
- The Amazing Adventures of Kavalier & Clay by Michael Chabon
- The Amber series by Roger Zelazny
- American Gods by Neil Gaiman
- Among Others by Jo Walton
- An Awfully Beastly Business series by David Sinden, Matthew Morgan, and Guy Macdonald
- The Anubis Gates by Tim Powers
- Apprentice Adept series by Piers Anthony
- Arafel duo by C. J. Cherryh
- The Artefacts of Power by Maggie Furey
- Artemis Fowl series by Eoin Colfer.
- At Swim-Two-Birds by Flann O'Brien
- At the Back of the North Wind by George MacDonald

== B ==
- The Bards of Bone Plain by Patricia A. McKillip
- Barsoom series by Edgar Rice Burroughs
- The Bartimaeus Trilogy by Jonathan Stroud
- Bas-Lag by China Miéville
- The Battle of Apocalypse by Eduardo Spohr
- Beauty by Robin McKinley
- Beauty by Sheri S. Tepper
- Beautiful Darkness (novel) by Kami Garcia and Margaret Stohl
- Beautiful Creatures (book) by Kami Garcia and Margaret Stohl
- The Belgariad series by David Eddings
- The Bell at Sealey Head by Patricia A. McKillip
- Beyond the Golden Stair by Hannes Bok
- Beyonders: A World Without Heroes by Brandon Mull
- Beyond the Spiderwick Chronicles by Holly Black
- The BFG by Roald Dahl
- The Bitterbynde trilogy by Cecilia Dart-Thornton
- Black Blossom by Boban Knežević
- The Black Company saga by Glen Cook, a nested set of sub-series
- The Black Jewels trilogy by Anne Bishop
- The Black Magician (novel series) by Trudi Canavan
- The Black Swan by Mercedes Lackey
- The Black Tides of Heaven by JY Yang
- Bloodring by Faith Hunter
- Blood Song by Anthony Ryan
- The Blue Star by Fletcher Pratt
- The Blue Sword by Robin McKinley
- Boggart series by Susan Cooper
- Bone Dance by Emma Bull
- The Book of Atrix Wolfe by Patricia McKillip
- Book of Enchantments by Patricia C. Wrede
- The Book of the New Sun series by Gene Wolfe
- The Book of Stars series by Erik L'Homme
- The Books of Abarat by Clive Barker
- Bookshops & Bonedust by Travis Baldree
- Brak the Barbarian by John Jakes
- Brigands & Breadknives by Travis Baldree
- Brisingr by Christopher Paolini
- Brown Girl in the Ring by Nalo Hopkinson
- Bloodlines by Richelle Mead

== C ==
- Callipygia by Lin Carter
- Captain Slaughterboard Drops Anchor by Mervyn Peake
- Cats Have No Lord by Will Shetterly
- The Changeling Sea by Patricia A. McKillip
- Chapel of Ease by Alex Bledsoe
- Charlie and the Chocolate Factory by Roald Dahl
- Charlie Bone Series by Jenny Nimmo
- The Chathrand Voyage Quartet by Robert V.S. Redick
- Chernevog by C. J. Cherryh
- Children of the Lamp series by P.B. Kerr
- Children of Blood and Bone series by Tomi Adeyemi
- Chimera by John Barth
- Chrestomanci series by Diana Wynne Jones
- Chronicles of an Age of Darkness by Hugh Cook
- Chronicles of Ancient Darkness by Michelle Paver
- Chronicles of Brothers series by Wendy Alec
- The Chronicles of Narnia by C.S. Lewis
- The Chronicles of Prydain by Lloyd Alexander
- Chronicles of The Raven by James Barclay
- The Chronicles of Thomas Covenant series by Stephen R. Donaldson
- The Circus of Dr. Lao by Charles G. Finney
- The City Beautiful by Aden Polydoros
- City of Bones by Martha Wells
- The City of Brass (novel) by S. A. Chakraborty
- The Claidi Journals by Tanith Lee
- Coldfire Trilogy by Celia S. Friedman
- A Cold Season by Alison Littlewood
- A Cold Silence by Alison Littlewood
- Cold Tom by Sally Prue
- Conan series by Robert E. Howard and others
- Coraline by Neil Gaiman
- A Court of Thorns and Roses by Sarah J. Maas
- The Cottingley Cuckoo by A. J. Elwood
- The Cottingley Secret by Hazel Gaynor
- The Court of the Air by Stephen Hunt
- The Craft Sequence by Max Gladstone
- The Crock of Gold by James Stephens
- The Cygnet and the Firebird by Patricia A. McKillip

== D ==
- The Dagger and the Coin series by Daniel Abraham
- Dalemark Quartet by Diana Wynne Jones
- The Dalkey Archive by Flann O'Brien
- Damiano series by R. A. MacAvoy
- The Dark Artifices trilogy by Cassandra Clare
- The Dark Is Rising sequence by Susan Cooper
- The Dark Tower series by Stephen King
- Daughter of the Lioness series by Tamora Pierce
- Day of the Giants by Lester del Rey
- The Death of the Necromancer by Martha Wells
- Deltora series by Emily Rodda
- The Deptford Mice by Robin Jarvis
- Deryni novels by Katherine Kurtz
- Descent into Hell by Charles Williams
- Dirk Gently series by Douglas Adams
- Discworld series by Terry Pratchett
- The Divine Cities series by Robert Jackson Bennett
- The Door in the Hedge by Robin McKinley
- The Door Within Trilogy by Wayne Thomas Batson
- Dorothea Dreams by Suzy McKee Charnas
- The Dragon House by Darrell Schweitzer
- The Dragonslayer's Apprentice by David Calder
- Dragoncharm trilogy by Graham Edwards
- The Dragon's Familiar by Lawrence Jeffrey Cohen
- Dragonlance Chronicles trilogy by Margaret Weis and Tracy Hickman
- Dragon Raja by Lee Yeongdo
- Dragon Rider by Cornelia Funke
- The Dragonbone Chair by Tad Williams
- The Dragonology Chronicles: The Dragon's Eye by Dugald Steer
- Dragonriders of Pern series by Anne McCaffrey
- Dragonrouge by Lin Carter
- Dragonsbane by Barbara Hambly
- Dragonvarld trilogy by Margaret Weis
- The Dreamwalker's Child by Steve Voake
- The Drawing of the Dark by Tim Powers
- The Dreamstone by C. J. Cherryh
- The Dresden Files series by Jim Butcher
- Drizzt Do'Urden novels by R. A. Salvatore
- Durand Col series by David Keck. Series has no official name, however Durand Col is generally used because he is the central focus of all the novels.
- Dusk or Dark or Dawn or Day by Seanan McGuire
- The Dying Earth series by Jack Vance

== E ==
- Ealdwood by C. J. Cherryh
- Earthsea series by Ursula K. Le Guin
- The Edge Chronicles by Paul Stewart and Chris Riddell
- Elantris by Brandon Sanderson
- The Elenium series by David Eddings
- Elric of Melnibone by Michael Moorcock
- Ella Enchanted by Gail Carson Levine
- The Empire Trilogy by Raymond E. Feist and Janny Wurts
- The Enchanted Castle by E. Nesbit
- Enchanted Forest series by Patricia C. Wrede
- Eon: Dragoneye Reborn by Alison Goodman
- Eragon by Christopher Paolini
- Eldest by Christopher Paolini
- Excalibur by Sanders Anne Laubenthal
- Expecting Someone Taller by Tom Holt
- The Eyes of the Dragon by Stephen King

== F ==
- Fablehaven series by Brandon Mull
- Faery in Shadow by C. J. Cherryh
- The Face in the Frost by John Bellairs
- The Faerie Wars Chronicles by Herbie Brennan
- Fafhrd and the Gray Mouser series by Fritz Leiber
- The Fairies of Sadieville by Alex Bledsoe
- Fantastic Beasts and Where to Find Them by J.K. Rowling
- Farsala trilogy by Hilari Bell
- The Farseer Trilogy by Robin Hobb
- The Fates of the Princes of Dyfed by Kenneth Morris
- Fearsome Creatures of the Lumberwoods by William T. Cox
- A Fine and Private Place by Peter S. Beagle
- The Fionavar Tapestry by Guy Gavriel Kay
- Fisher King series by Tim Powers
- A Far Better Thing by H. G. Parry
- Fledgling by Octavia Butler
- Flesh and Fire by Laura Anne Gilman
- Flying Dutch by Tom Holt
- The Fool on the Hill by Matt Ruff
- The Forgotten Beasts of Eld by Patricia McKillip
- Fortress series by C. J. Cherryh
- Fourth Mansions by R. A. Lafferty
- Fourth Wing by Rebecca Yarros

== G ==
- Garrett series by Glen Cook
- Gather Her Round by Alex Bledsoe
- Gezeitenwelt series by Magus Magellan
- The Ghost and The Goth by Stacey Kade
- Ghost Blows Out the Light by Zhang Muye
- Ghostwritten by David Mitchell
- Giant of World's End by Lin Carter
- The Girl in a Swing by Richard Adams
- Gloriana, or The Unfulfill'd Queen by Michael Moorcock
- The Goblin Emperor by Katherine Addison
- The Goblin Mirror by C. J. Cherryh
- Goddess of the River by Vaishnavi Patel
- Gods of Jade and Shadow by Silvia Moreno-Garcia
- The Golem and the Jinni by Helene Wecker
- Gormenghast series by Mervyn Peake - see at T (Titus), below
- Graceling by Kristin Cashore
- The Great God Pan by Arthur Machen
- The Green Child by Herbert Read
- The Green Round by Arthur Machen
- Green Rider by Kristen Britain
- Grendel by John Gardner
- Grishaverse by Leigh Bardugo
- Guardians of Ga'Hoole series by Kathryn Lasky

== H ==
- The Hagwood Books by Robin Jarvis
- Half a Soul by Olivia Atwater
- The Halfblood Chronicles by Mercedes Lackey and Andre Norton
- Haroun and the Sea of Stories by Salman Rushdie
- Harry Potter series by J. K. Rowling
- Hart's Hope by Orson Scott Card
- The Haunted Woman by David Lindsay
- The Haunting of Hill House by Shirley Jackson
- The Heart of What Was Lost by Tad Williams
- The Heavenly Fox by Richard Parks
- Here Comes the Sun by Tom Holt
- Hereafter, and After by Richard Parks
- Heroes of the Valley by Jonathan Stroud
- The Heroes of Olympus by Rick Riordan
- The Hidden People by Alison Littlewood
- The Hill of Dreams by Arthur Machen
- His Dark Materials series by Philip Pullman
- History of The Vollplaen by Daniel Johnson
- The Hobbit by J. R. R. Tolkien
- The Hounds of the Morrigan by Pat O'Shea
- The House on the Borderland by William Hope Hodgson
- House of Night by P.C. Cast
- The House on Parchment Street by Patricia A. McKillip
- The House with a Clock in Its Walls by John Bellairs
- Howl's Moving Castle by Diana Wynne Jones
- The Hum and the Shiver by Alex Bledsoe
- The Hundred Thousand Kingdoms by N. K. Jemisin
- Hush, Hush by Becca Fitzpatrick

== I ==
- The Idylls of the Queen by Phyllis Ann Karr
- Ile-Rien series by Martha Wells
- The Immortals series by Tamora Pierce
- Incarnations of Immortality series by Piers Anthony
- The Incorruptibles by John Hornor Jacobs
- Inda (novel) by Sherwood Smith
- In the Forests of Serre by Patricia McKillip
- The Infernal Desire Machines of Doctor Hoffman (aka The War of Dreams) by Angela Carter
- Ingo series by Helen Dunmore
- The Inheritance Cycle by Christopher Paolini
  - Eragon, Eldest, Brisingr, Inheritance
- Inheritance by Steven Savile
- Ink Exchange | Wicked Lovely by Melissa Marr
- Inkheart Trilogy by Cornelia Funke
  - Inkheart, Inkspell, Inkdeath
- The Invisible Library series by Genevieve Cogman
  - The Invisible Library, The Masked City, The Burning Page, The Lost Plot
- Iron Flame by Rebecca Yarros
- Islandia by Austin Tappan Wright
- The Infernal Devices trilogy by Cassandra Clare
  - Clockwork Angel, Clockwork Prince, Clockwork Princess

== J ==
- Jade City by Fonda Lee
- James and the Giant Peach by Roald Dahl
- Jonathan Strange & Mr. Norrell by Susanna Clarke
- Journalists (novel) by Sergei Aman

== K ==
- Kai Lung series by Ernest Bramah
- Kaikeyi by Vaishnavi Patel
- The Kaleidoscope Chronicles by Robert Barrett
- Kandide and the Secret of the Mists by Diana S. Zimmerman
- The Kane Chronicles by Rick Riordan
- Kellory the Warlock by Lin Carter
- Keeper of the Lost Cities by Shannon Messenger
- Kesrick by Lin Carter
- The Keys to the Kingdom by Garth Nix
- The Khaavren Romances by Steven Brust
- Khaled: A Tale of Arabia by F. Marion Crawford
- The Kin of Ata Are Waiting for You, by Dorothy Bryant
- The King in Yellow by Robert W. Chambers
- The King of Elfland's Daughter by Lord Dunsany
- King Rat by China Miéville
- Kingdoms of Elfin by Sylvia Townsend Warner
- The Kingdoms of Thorn and Bone by Greg Keyes
- Kingfisher by Patricia A. McKillip
- The Kingkiller Chronicle by Patrick Rothfuss
- Krondor's Sons (The Riftwar Stories) by Raymond E. Feist
- Kushiel's Legacy by Jacqueline Carey

== L ==
- The Land Across by Gene Wolfe
- The Last Dragon by Silvana De Mari
- The Last Unicorn by Peter S. Beagle
- The Last Voyage of Somebody the Sailor by John Barth
- Latro series by Gene Wolfe
- The Lays of Anuskaya series by Bradley Beaulieu
- The Lays of Beleriand by J. R. R. Tolkien
- Legends & Lattes by Travis Baldree
- Legends of the Riftwar by Raymond E. Feist
- Legendborn by Tracy Deonn
- Letters from a Lost Uncle by Mervyn Peake
- The Library at Mount Char by Scott Hawkins
- The Lies of Locke Lamora by Scott Lynch
- Life of Pi by Yann Martel
- The Life and Opinions of the Tomcat Murr by E. T. A. Hoffmann
- Lilith by George MacDonald
- The Little Grey Men by BB
- The Little White Horse by Elizabeth Goudge
- Little People by Tom Holt
- Little, Big by John Crowley
- Lolly Willowes by Sylvia Townsend Warner
- Long Black Curl by Alex Bledsoe
- The Long Look by Richard Parks
- The Long Price Quartet series by Daniel Abraham
- The Lord of the Rings by J. R. R. Tolkien
- The Lost Continent: The Story of Atlantis by C. J. Cutcliffe Hyne
- Lost Tales by J. R. R. Tolkien
- Lud-in-the-Mist by Hope Mirrlees
- Lyonesse series by Jack Vance
- Lyra series by Patricia Wrede

== M ==
- M is for Magic series by Neil Gaiman
- The Magic City by E. Nesbit
- The Magician Out of Manchuria by Charles G. Finney
- The Magician Trilogy by Jenny Nimmo
- The Magician's Daughter by H. G. Parry
- The Magicians by Lev Grossman
- Magyk by Angie Sage
- Malazan Book of the Fallen series by Steven Erikson
- The Malloreon by David and Leigh Eddings
- The Man Who Was Thursday by G. K. Chesterton
- Mandricardo by Lin Carter
- Marianne by Sheri S. Tepper
- The Mark of the Demons by John Jakes
- Martin Dressler by Steven Millhauser
- Mary Poppins series by P. L. Travers
- The Mask of the Sorcerer by Darrell Schweitzer
- The Master and Margarita by Mikhail Bulgakov
- Master Li by Barry Hughart
- Matilda by Roald Dahl
- May Bird and the Ever After series by Jodie Lynn Anderson
- Memoirs of a Master Forger by William Heaney
- Mention My Name in Atlantis by John Jakes
- Merlin's Ring by H. Warner Munn
- The Merman's Children by Poul Anderson
- Mickelsson's Ghosts by John Gardner
- Middlegame by Seanan McGuire
- Millroy the Magician by Paul Theroux
- Mistress Masham's Repose by T. H. White
- Mistborn series by Brandon Sanderson
- The Mists of Avalon by Marion Zimmer Bradley
- Memory, Sorrow, and Thorn by Tad Williams
- Moonheart by Charles de Lint
- The Mortal Instruments series by Cassandra Clare
- Mr. Magorium's Wonder Emporium by Suzanne Weyn
- Mr. Pye by Mervyn Peake
- The Murders of Molly Southbourne by Tade Thompson
- Myth Adventures series by Robert Asprin

== N ==
- The Nightrunner Series by Lynn Flewelling
- The Name of the Wind by Patrick Rothfuss
- The Neverending Story by Michael Ende
- Neverwhere by Neil Gaiman
- A Night in the Lonesome October by Roger Zelazny
- The Night Land by William Hope Hodgson
- Nights at the Circus by Angela Carter
- Nothing But Blue Skies by Tom Holt
- Number9Dream by David Mitchell
- The Named by Marianne Curley

== O ==
- The Obernewtyn Chronicles by Isobelle Carmody
- Od Magic by Patricia McKillip
- Oksa Pollock series by Anne Plichota and Cendrine Wolf
- Ombria in Shadow by Patricia McKillip
- On Stranger Tides by Tim Powers
- The Once and Future King series by T.H. White
- Onyx Storm by Rebecca Yarros
- The Orb and the Sceptre by Philip G. Williamson
- Orlando by Virginia Woolf
- Oscar Pill series by Eli Anderson
- Our Ancestors a set by Italo Calvino
- Overtime by Tom Holt
- Oz series (40 "canonical" titles) by L. Frank Baum (original creator and author of 14 books of the series), Ruth Plumly Thompson (19 books), Rachel R. Cosgrove (1 book), John R. Neill (author of 3 books), Jack Snow (2 books), and Eloise Jarvis McGraw & Lauren McGraw Wagner (1 book as co-authors)

== P ==
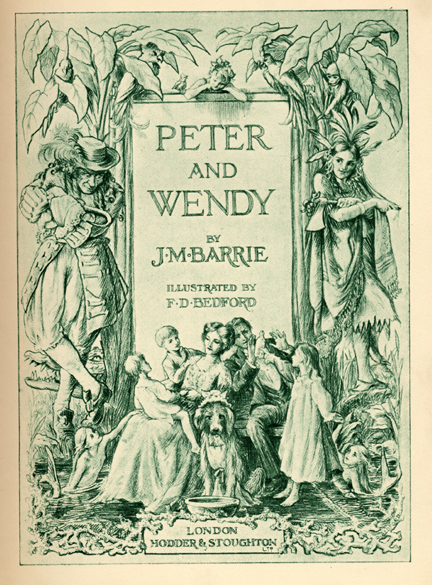

- Paint Your Dragon by Tom Holt
- The Paladin by C. J. Cherryh
- Pandava Quintet by Roshani Chokshi
- Passing Strange by Ellen Klages
- Peace by Gene Wolfe
- Pellinor by Alison Croggon
- Pellucidar series by Edgar Rice Burroughs
- The Pendragon Adventure by D. J. MacHale
- Percy Jackson & the Olympians by Rick Riordan
- Peregrine: Primus by Avram Davidson
- Peregrine: Secundus by Avram Davidson
- The Perilous Gard by Elizabeth Marie Pope
- Peter and Wendy aka Peter Pan by J. M. Barrie
- Peter Pan in Kensington Gardens by J. M. Barrie
- Phantastes by George MacDonald
- The Phoenix and the Mirror by Avram Davidson
- Pilgermann by Russell Hoban
- Pinocchio by Carlo Collodi
- The Piratica Series by Tanith Lee
- The Place of the Lion by Charles Williams
- Policeman Bluejay by L. Frank Baum
- The Poppy War by R. F. Kuang
- Portrait of Jennie by Robert Nathan
- The Power of Five Series (a.k.a. The Gatekeepers Series) by Anthony Horowitz
- Practical Magic by Alice Hoffman
- Prince of Nothing trilogy by R. Scott Bakker
- The Princes of the Golden Cage by Nathalie Mallet
- The Princess Bride by William Goldman
- Promise of Blood by Brian McClellan
- Protector of the Small series by Tamora Pierce
- The Chronicles of Prydain by Lloyd Alexander

== Q ==
- The Quest of Kadji by Lin Carter
- Quidditch Through The Ages by J.K. Rowling
- The Quentaris Chronicles by various Australian writers
- Queste by Angie Sage

== R ==
- The Rage of Dragons by Evan Winter
- Ranger's Apprentice series by John Flanagan
- The Raven Cycle by Maggie Stiefvater
- The Raven Tower by Ann Leckie
- Raybearer duology by Jordan Ifueko
- Red Moon and Black Mountain by Joy Chant
- Red Sister by Mark Lawrence
- The Red Threads of Fortune by JY Yang
- Redwall by Brian Jacques
- The Revenants by Sheri S. Tepper
- A Riddle of Roses by Caryl Cude Mullin
- The Riddle-Master trilogy by Patricia A. McKillip
- Riftwar series by Raymond E. Feist
- The Ring of Allaire by Susan Dexter
- Rose Daughter by Robin McKinley
- Roverandom by J. R. R. Tolkien
- The Runelords series by David Farland
- Rusalka by C. J. Cherryh
- Rivers of London by Ben Aaronovitch

== S ==
- Sangreal Trilogy by Jan Siegel
- The Scarlet Fig by Avram Davidson
- The Scholar and the Last Faerie Door by H. G. Parry
- The School for Good and Evil series by Soman Chainani
- The Sea of Trolls by Nancy Farmer
- Seasonal Fears by Seanan McGuire
- The Secrets of the Immortal Nicholas Flamel series by Michael Scott
- Senlin Ascends by Josiah Bancroft
- Septimus Heap series by Angie Sage
- The Shadow Campaigns by Django Wexler
- The Shadow of What Was Lost by James Islington
- Shadow Warrior series by Chris Bunch
- Shadowmarch by Tad Williams
- Shadowplay by Tad Williams
- Shannara series by Terry Brooks
- The Shape-Changer's Wife by Sharon Shinn
- The Shapeshifter series by Ali Sparkes
- Shardik by Richard Adams
- The Shattered Goddess by Darrell Schweitzer
- Shattered Sea series by Joe Abercrombie
- The Shaving of Shagpat by George Meredith
- Shrek! by William Steig
- The Silent Land by Graham Joyce
- The Silmarillion by J. R. R. Tolkien
- Silver John series by Manly Wade Wellman
- Silverlock by John Myers Myers
- Skin of the Sea by Natasha Bowen
- Snow White and Rose Red by Patricia C. Wrede
- Snow White and the Seven Samurai by Tom Holt
- Solstice Wood by Patricia A. McKillip
- Some Kind of Fairy Tale by Graham Joyce
- Something Rich and Strange by Patricia A. McKillip
- Song for the Basilisk by Patricia A. McKillip
- A Song of Ice and Fire series by George R. R. Martin
- A Song of Wraiths and Ruin by Roseanne A. Brown
- The Song of the Lioness series by Tamora Pierce
- The Song of the Shattered Sands series by Bradley Beaulieu
- The Sorcerer's Ship by Hannes Bok
- The Sorceress and the Cygnet by Patricia A. McKillip
- The Spiderwick Chronicles by Holly Black
- Spindle's End by Robin McKinley
- Spook's by Joseph Delaney
- The Stand by Stephen King
- The Starcatchers series by Dave Barry and Ridley Pearson
- Stardust by Neil Gaiman
- The Stardust Thief by Chelsea Abdullah
- The Steerswoman by Rosemary Kirstein
- Stone and Sky trilogy by Graham Edwards
- Stone of Farewell by Tad Williams
- The Stormlight Archive series by Brandon Sanderson
- Stravaganza series by Mary Hoffman
- The Stress of Her Regard by Tim Powers
- Stuart Little by E. B. White
- The Sun and the Star by Rick Riordan and Mark Oshiro
- The Sundering Flood by William Morris
- The Switchers Trilogy by Kate Thompson
- The Sword of Truth series by Terry Goodkind
- The Sword Smith by Eleanor Arnason
- Swordbird by Nancy Yi Fan
- Swords Against the Shadowland by Robin Wayne Bailey
- The Swords of Lankhmar by Fritz Leiber
- Swordspoint by Ellen Kushner
- Symphony of Ages series by Elizabeth Haydon

== T ==
Note: If a novel or a novel series starts with "The", that does not mean it is in the "T" List. Example: The Trials of Apollo is a "T" because trials starts with T. The Chronicles of Narnia is not, it's a" C".

- Tailchaser's Song by Tad Williams
- Tales From The Flat Earth series by Tanith Lee
- The Tales of Alvin Maker series by Orson Scott Card
- The Tales Of Beedle The Bard by J.K. Rowling
- The Tales of the Otori by Lian Hearn
- Talking Man by Terry Bisson
- Tam Lin by Pamela Dean
- The Tamuli series by David Eddings
- Tara of the Twilight by Lin Carter
- Tarzan series by Edgar Rice Burroughs
- A Taste of Honey by Kai Ashante Wilson
- Ten Silver Coins by Andrew Kooman
- These Violent Delights by Chloe Gong
- The Thief of Always by Clive Barker
- The Thief Lord by Cornelia Funke
- The Fork, the Witch, and the Worm by Christopher Paolini
- Thieves' World series edited by Robert Asprin and Lynn Abbey
- The Third Policeman by Flann O'Brien
- Thongor Against the Gods by Lin Carter
- Thongor at the End of Time by Lin Carter
- Thongor Fights the Pirates of Tarakus by Lin Carter
- Thongor in the City of Magicians by Lin Carter
- Thongor of Lemuria by Lin Carter
- The Three Impostors by Arthur Machen
- The Three Worlds Cycle by Ian Irvine
- Three Hearts and Three Lions by Poul Anderson
- Three to See the King by Magnus Mills
- The Throme of the Erril of Sherill by Patricia A. McKillip
- Through the Looking-Glass by Lewis Carroll
- Thunder on the Left by Christopher Morley
- Tigana by Guy Gavriel Kay
- Tithe: A Modern Faerie Tale by Holly Black
- Titus series (aka Gormenghast) by Mervyn Peake
- To Green Angel Tower by Tad Williams
- Tomoe Gozen series by Jessica Amanda Salmonson
- The Tooth Fairy by Graham Joyce
- Topper duo by Thorne Smith
- The Touch of Evil by John Rackham
- The Tower at Stony Wood by Patricia McKillip
- Traitor's Blade by Sebastien de Castell
- Traitor Son Cycle series by Miles Cameron
- The Traitor Baru Cormorant by Seth Dickinson
- The Tree of Swords and Jewels by C. J. Cherryh
- The Trials of Apollo series by Rick Riordan
- The Twilight series by Stephenie Meyer
- The Tea Master and the Detective by Aliette de Bodard

== U ==
- Un Lun Dun by China Miéville
- The Underland Chronicles by Suzanne Collins
- Unfinished Tales by J. R. R. Tolkien
- The Unicorn Series by Tanith Lee
- The Unicorns of Balinor by Mary Stanton
- The Unspoken Name by A.K. Larkwood
- Ursus of Ultima Thule by Avram Davidson

== V ==
- Vampire Academy by Richelle Mead
- Valhalla by Tom Holt
- Velgarth series by Mercedes Lackey
- Vergil in Averno by Avram Davidson
- Villains by Necessity by Eve Forward
- Viriconium cycle by M. John Harrison
- The Vlad Taltos books by Steven Brust
- Von Bek series by Michael Moorcock
- A Voyage to Arcturus by David Lindsay

== W ==
- War in Heaven by Charles Williams
- The War of Dreams (aka The Infernal Desire Machines of Doctor Hoffman) by Angela Carter
- The War of the Flowers by Tad Williams
- Warbreaker by Brandon Sanderson
- The Warrior of World's End by Lin Carter
- Warriors Series by Erin Hunter
- The Water-Babies, A Fairy Tale for a Land Baby by Charles Kingsley
- The Water of the Wondrous Isles by William Morris
- Watership Down by Richard Adams
- Weaveworld by Clive Barker
- The Well at the World's End by William Morris
- The Well of the Unicorn by Fletcher Pratt
- Wheel of Time series by Robert Jordan
- When the Birds Fly South by Stanton A. Coblentz
- When the Idols Walked by John Jakes
- The Whitby Witches by Robin Jarvis
- The White Isle by Darrell Schweitzer
- Who's Afraid of Beowulf? by Tom Holt
- Who Censored Roger Rabbit? by Gary K. Wolf
- The Wind in the Willows by Kenneth Grahame
- Wings of Fire series by Tui T. Sutherland
- Winnie-The-Pooh by A.A. Milne
- Winter Rose by Patricia McKillip
- Winter's Tale by Mark Helprin
- Winternight trilogy by Katherine Arden
- Wish You Were Here by Tom Holt
- Wisp of a Thing by Alex Bledsoe
- Witch of the Four Winds by John Jakes
- The Witcher series by Andrzej Sapkowski
- The Witness for the Dead by Katherine Addison
- The Wish Giver by Bill Brittain
- The Wizard of Lemuria by Lin Carter
- Wizard of the Pigeons by Megan Lindholm
- The Wizard of Zao by Lin Carter
- The Wolf Leader by Alexandre Dumas
- The Wolves in the Walls by Neil Gaiman
- Women of the Otherworld series by Canadian author Kelley Armstrong.
- The Wonderful Wizard of Oz by Frank L. Baum.
- The Wood Beyond the World by William Morris
- The World According to Novikoff by Andrei Gusev
- The Worldbreaker Saga by Kameron Hurley
- The Worm Ouroboros by E. R. Eddison
- A Wrinkle in Time by Madeleine L'Engle
- Wizard and Glass by Stephen King

== X ==
- Xanth series by Piers Anthony

== Y ==
- Yamada Monogatari: The Emperor in Shadow by Richard Parks
- Yamada Monogatari: The War God's Son by Richard Parks
- Yamada Monogatari: To Break the Demon Gate by Richard Parks
- The Year of the Ladybird by Graham Joyce
- Young Wizards series by Diane Duane
- Yvgenie by C. J. Cherryh

== Z ==
- Zimiamvia series by E. R. Eddison
- Zoo City by Lauren Beukes

== See also ==
- List of fantasy authors
- List of science fiction novels
- List of fantasy story collections
- List of alternate history fiction
- List of science fiction publishers
