= Vladimir Lazović =

Serbian writer

Vladimir Lazović (Serbian Cyrillic: Владимир Лазовић; born 1954 in Belgrad) is a Serbian science fiction and fantasy writer.

He has been writing fiction since his twenties, in a variety of genres: his works range over alternate history, Slavic-mythology based fantasy, and cyberpunk.

== Bibliography ==
- Hrim, the warrior (Hrim, ratnik), a novel, (under pen-name Valdemar Lejzi), X–100 SF, Dnevnik, Novi Sad, 1987.

Noted anthologies and collections:

- Kiberpank, Sirius, Zagreb
- Tamni vilajet 1, Beograd, edited by Boban Knežević, Znak Sagite, Beograd, 1987.
- Tamni vilajet 1a, Beograd, edited by Boban Knežević, Znak Sagite, Beograd, 1987.
- Tamni vilajet 2, edited by Boban Knežević, Znak Sagite, Beograd, 1992.
- Tamni vilajet 3, edited by Boban Knežević, Znak Sagite, Beograd, 1993.
- Tamni vilajet 4, edited by Boban Knežević, Znak Sagite, Beograd, 1996.
- Nova srpska fantastika, edited by Boban Knežević & Sava Damjanov, SIC, Beograd, 1994.
- Monolit 8, edited by Boban Knežević, Znak Sagite, Beograd.
- Domaća post(žanrovska) fantastika na početku veka u Orbis, Kanjiža, edited by Ilija Bakić
- Domaća (post)žanrovska fantastika s kraja 90-ih u Orbis, Kanjiža, edited by Ilija Bakić
- Domaće fantastičke priče u Naš trag, Velika Plana, edited by Ilija Bakić
- Tamna zvezda, Presing, Niš, edited by Dejan Ognjanović, Niš, 2005.
- Ugriz strasti (priče erotske fantastike), edited by Pavle Zelić, SFFC „Lazar Komarčić“, 2007.

== Awards ==
- „Lazar Komarčić“ award for best novella in 1987. („Sokolar“)
- „Sfera“ for best novella in 1987. („Sokolar“)
- „Lazar Komarčić“ award for best novella in 1994. („Preko duge“)
- „Lazar Komarčić“ award for best novella in 2003. („Beli vitez“), with Vladimir Vesović
