= Thundergun =

Thundergun or thunder gun may refer to:

- brand name of impact tools made by Ingersoll Rand Industrial Technologies
- fictional gun featured in the Call of Duty: Black Ops video game's Zombies mode
- a fictional movie franchise in the sitcom It's Always Sunny in Philadelphia
- a type of fictional character in Isle of Swords
- donrebusse (thunder-gun), another term for blunderbuss
