= Cultural depictions of George I of Great Britain =

On screen, George I of Great Britain has been portrayed by Peter Bull in the 1948 film Saraband for Dead Lovers, Eric Pohlmann in the 1953 film Rob Roy, the Highland Rogue, Otto Waldis in the 1954 film The Iron Glove, and Steve Plytas in an episode of the Granada Television series Rogues' Gallery entitled "A Bed-Full of Miracles" (1969).

George was also featured in the book Isle of Fire by Wayne Thomas Batson.
