= Rogue Mage series =

Series of novels by Faith Hunter

The Rogue Mage series of fantasy novels were written by American author Faith Hunter about races of beings inhabiting a post-apocalyptic Earth of the not-too distant future. Some of them possess magical powers. The series is set in the remains of the United States about a century after an apocalypse similar to the one predicted in the Book of Revelation, but with no God appearing.

== Bloodring ==
Bloodring
- Author: Faith Hunter
- Cover artist: Cliff Nielson
- Language: English
- Series: Rogue Mage
- Genre: fantasy
- Publisher: Roc Trade
- Publication date: 2006 November 7
- Publication place: United States
- Media type: Trade paperback
- Pages: 336
- ISBN: 0-451-46108-8
- OCLC: 68624014
- Dewey Decimal: 813/.6 22
- LC Class: PS3608.U5927 B55 2006
- Followed by: Seraphs

Bloodring (ISBN 0-451-46108-8) is the first fantasy novel by Hunter and the first installment of the series. It was published by Roc Trade on 2006 November 7. It was given a three-star review by Romantic Times.

=== Plot summary ===
The story take place about a century after an apocalypse. It includes "neomages", a new race of beings that arose during the time of the apocalypse. They live in an area known as the Enclave, which is both a prison and sanctuary, and are able to work with "leftover creation energy".

Thorn St. Croix is a neomage in exile from the Enclave. Thorn (unlike most mages) is telepathic, and she constantly hears the thoughts of the other mages in the Enclave. This threatened to drive her insane when it began during her adolescence and forced her to live amongst humans whose thoughts she does not hear.

Because mages without a special license are not allowed amongst the human population, Thorn must hide her true nature lest she be killed, either by the humans - who would torture her first - or by the seraphs who have ruled the earth since the apocalypse began.

Thorn is a "stone mage", and channels her talents with stone into lapidary work and jewelry-making, running the store, Thorn's Gems, with her partners, Rupert and Jaycee, in the small town of Mineral City, Carolina, where they all live.

Thorn's life is suddenly disrupted when police officer Thaddeus Bartholomew comes to her door and announces that her ex-husband Lucas, (who is also Rupert's brother) has been kidnapped. She is a suspect. Thadd, it turns out, is a kylen, progeny of a seraph and a mix of human and mage. Thorn realizes this when he "kindles" her mage-heat. Amazingly, Thadd appears not to know he is anything but pure human, and were he to discover her secret, he would immediately arrest her for being an unlicensed mage outside of Enclave. She must risk death in order to save the father of her former stepdaughter, Ciana - the child of her heart.

== Seraphs ==
Seraphs
- Author: Faith Hunter
- Cover artist: Cliff Nielson
- Language: English
- Series: Rogue Mage
- Genre: fantasy
- Publisher: Roc Trade
- Publication date: 2007 May 1
- Publication place: United States
- Media type: Trade paperback
- Pages: 356
- ISBN: 978-0-451-46147-6
- OCLC: 71329893
- Dewey Decimal: 813/.6 22
- LC Class: PS3608.U5927 S47 2007
- Preceded by: Bloodring
- Followed by: Host

Seraphs is the second novel of the series. It was given a four-star review by Romantic Times.

== Host ==
Host
- Author: Faith Hunter
- Cover artist: Cliff Nielson
- Language: English
- Series: Rogue Mage
- Genre: fantasy
- Publisher: Roc Trade
- Publication date: 2007 November 6
- Publication place: United States
- Media type: Trade paperback
- Pages: 340
- ISBN: 978-0-451-46173-5
- OCLC: 123539682
- Dewey Decimal: 813/.6 22
- LC Class: PS3608.U5927 H67 2007
- Preceded by: Seraphs

Host is the third novel of the series. It was given a four-and-one-half-star review by Romantic Times.

== Triumphant ==
Triumphant
- Editors: Spike Y Jones, Faith Hunter
- Cover artist: Mike Pruette
- Language: English
- Series: Rogue Mage
- Genre: fantasy
- Publisher: Lore Seekers Press
- Publication date: 2017 May 12
- Publication place: United States
- Media type: Trade paperback
- Pages: 353
- ISBN: 978-1-62268-114-3

Triumphant (Rogue Mage Anthology Omnibus) (ISBN 978-1-62268-114-3) is a short story anthology set in the Rogue Mage universe, edited by Spike Y Jones and Faith Hunter. It was published by Lore Seekers Press on 2017 May 12. The book was also published as two e-books, Trials and Tribulations in late 2016.

It features 3 new stories and vignettes by Hunter, 14 new stories by 10 other authors, and 21 stories and vignettes by Hunter that had previously appeared in the Rogue Mage Roleplaying Game.

== New Stories ==
1. "Finding The Way", by Misty Massey
2. "TNT", by Faith Hunter
3. "Epena's Epiphany", by Lou J Berger
4. "The Price of Power", by Ken Schrader
5. "Monster", by Spike Y Jones
6. "Ashes And Dust", by Diana Pharaoh Francis
7. "Defiance", by Christina Stiles
8. "The Stars Were Right", by Spike Y Jones
9. "Alone", by Faith Hunter
10. "Mettilwynd", by Tamsin L. Silver
11. "Requiem Of The Sea", by Melissa McArthur
12. "River Bones", by Jean Rabe
13. "A Start", by Spike Y Jones
14. "Two Mules For Brother Hope", by Christina Stiles
15. "Our Lady Of The Stones", by Spike Y Jones
16. "Rolling Stone", by Lucienne Diver
17. "Kraken Conquered", by Faith Hunter

== Reprinted Stories ==
all by Faith Hunter

1. "Stone Walls A Prison Make"
2. "The Honeymoon Is Over"
3. "Set In Stone"
4. "Wind Blown"
5. "Day One"
6. "Wheels In Motion"
7. "Bait"
8. "Storm Songs"
9. "Sons"
10. "The Best-Laid Plans"
11. "Unbidden Bonds"
12. "Bones"
13. "A Wing And A Prayer"
14. "The Magnificent Seven"
15. "Girl Loves To Shop"
16. "Beauty And The Beasts"
17. "Trading Debts"
18. "Wings On Site"
19. "Tears Of Taharial"
20. "Lions And Tigers And Monkey's, Oh My!"
21. "Pan-Elemental"

== Role-playing game ==
Hunter collaborated with Christina Stiles and Raven Blackwell to create a role-playing game based on the Rogue Mage series. It is published by Bella Rosa Books and Misfit Studios as two volumes, the Rogue Mage Roleplaying Game Player's Handbook and the Rogue Mage Roleplaying Game Game Master's Guide.

== See also ==
- List of apocalyptic and post-apocalyptic fiction
- List of fantasy novels
- List of fantasy authors
