= Black Breath =

Black Breath may refer to:

- Black Breath (band), an American extreme metal band
- Black Breath (Nazgûl), an ability of the Nazgûl of J. R. R. Tolkien's Middle-earth
- "Black Breath", a song on the 1989 album Horrified by grindcore band Repulsion
- "Black Breath", a 2021 single by Anson Kong
- Black breath, a skill of the Wyrm Lord from The Door Within trilogy by Wayne Thomas Batson
