= Bălaia =

Bălaia may refer to several villages in Romania:

- Bălaia, a village in Filipeni Commune, Bacău County
- Bălaia, a village in Tileagd Commune, Bihor County
- Bălaia, a village in Smeeni Commune, Buzău County

See also:

- Balaia (Raven), a fictional country in the Chronicles of the Raven by James Barclay
