= Elfsorrow =

2002 novel by James Barclay

- First edition
- Author: James Barclay
- Cover artist: Fred Gambino
- Language: English
- Series: Legends of The Raven
- Genre: Fantasy novel
- Publisher: Gollancz
- Publication date: 2002
- Publication place: England
- Media type: Print (Paperback)
- Pages: 496
- ISBN: 978-0-575-07398-2
- OCLC: 52143530
- Preceded by: Nightchild
- Followed by: Shadowheart

Elfsorrow is a book by James Barclay. It is the first book in the trilogy Legends of the Raven, which takes place after Chronicles of the Raven. At this stage, the members of The Raven are Hirad Coldheart, The Unknown Warrior, Thraun, Ry Darrick, Denser, Erienne and Ilkar.

== Plot summary ==
The Raven travel to a new continent in search of mages to help rebuild the ruined college of Julatsa. However, they find themselves in the midst of a cursed plague that threatens to wipe out the elven race.
