= The Up-and-Under (novel series) =

Series of novellas by Seanan McGuire

- Cover art for "Over the Woodward Wall", the first entry in the series
- Over the Woodward Wall; Along the Saltwise Sea; Into the Windwracked Wilds; Under the Smokestrewn Sky
- Author: Seanan McGuire, writing as A. Deborah Baker
- Country: United States
- Language: English
- Genre: Fantasy; fairy tale
- Publisher: Tor Books
- Published: 6 Oct 2020 (Book 1)
- No. of books: 4

The Up-and-Under is a series of novellas by Seanan McGuire, writing under the pen name A. Deborah Baker. It currently comprises four novellas. Baker is a fictional character in McGuire's Alchemical Journeys series, which began with 2019's Middlegame. Sections of Over the Woodward Wall were quoted in Middlegame and were later expanded into a full story in their own right.

== Plot ==
=== Over the Woodward Wall ===
Avery and Zib are two ordinary children who live on the same street but have never met. Avery is organized and reserved; Zib is free-spirited and rambunctious. One day while walking to school, they encounter a mysterious wall. They climb over the wall and find themselves in a forest.

The two children encounter several inhabitants of the Up-and-Under, the land where they now find themselves. These include talking owls and gnomes. Eventually, they encounter the Improbable Road. At the end of the road lies the Impossible City, where the ruling Queen of Wands can send them home.

As the children follow the road, they are trapped in a mudslide and rescued by a shapeshifting Crow Girl. Zib meets the Queen of Swords and receives a skeleton lock, while the Crow Girl has stolen the matching skeleton key. Zib and her companions open the lock and fall into a deep hole, ending up in the territory of the King of Cups.

The children are rescued by Niamh, a water spirit. Zib and Avery quarrel; this accidentally summons the Page of Frozen Waters, who is loyal to the King of Cups. The Page captures Zib. Avery and the Crow Girl face off against the King and Page, who want to turn Zib into another crow girl. They escape the King and return to the Improbable Road.

A group of owls, each of whom has provided advice to the children at previous points in the story, informs the children that the Queen of Wands is missing. They are tasked with finding her. Avery, Zib, the Crow Girl, and Niamh walk along the Improbable Road together as they begin their quest.

== Major themes ==
A review in Kirkus Reviews wrote that Over the Woodward Wall "draws heavily on the tropes of a stock 20th-century children’s fantasy." Nevertheless, McGuire's "sharp and thoughtful perspective" turns the novel into a commentary on those 20th century works. The fictional A. Deborah Baker was presented as a contemporary of L. Frank Baum, with the Up-and-Under books as "commercial and alchemical rivals" to Baum's Oz novels. Despite this, several elements of Over the Woodward Wall indicate that it is set considerably later than the early 1900s. These scenes include "planned suburban communities, a woman working in a street repair crew, playgrounds with slides, etc." The review stated that "Surely that is a deliberate choice on McGuire’s part, but what does it portend?"

== Background ==
The Up-and-Under novels are closely related to McGuire's 2019 novel Middlegame. In Middlegame, fictional alchemist Asphodel Deborah Baker wrote a children's book entitled Over the Woodward Wall. Middlegame quoted from snippets of Baker's work. McGuire later wrote the entire novel under the pen name A. Deborah Baker.

== Reception ==
=== Book 1 ===
Publishers Weekly gave Over the Woodward Wall a starred review, calling it a "grown-up fairy tale" that "works on every level." The review stated that readers did not need to be familiar with Middlegame to enjoy the tale, but that "the connection to Middlegame adds a complex, self-aware edge that elevates the story beyond the children’s fantasies that inspired it."

Katharine Coldiron of Locus Magazine wrote that she loved the book despite not having read Middlegame. Coldiron stated "I was reminded of my most beloved books from childhood: The Phantom Tollbooth, the Chronicles of Narnia, Finn Family Moomintroll. Like those old friends, Over the Woodward Wall made me feel as if the book was caring for me, individually, and that its love language was storytelling." Coldiron praised the prose and the way in which the novel could appeal to readers of any age, despite ostensibly being a children's book. She criticized the way in which the final section of the novel was a set-up for the sequel rather than telling a complete story in itself, but ultimately found that the novel was "delectable" and "a ripe treat for lifelong readers."

Alex Brown of Reactor loved the novel, writing that it is "as wonderful and charming as you expect a Seanan McGuire book to be, yet straightforward enough to appeal to middle grade readers." Brown furthermore praised the protagonists, writing the following:

Avery and Zib are “ordinary, average, wildly unique, as all children are.” Their sheer ordinariness is what makes them so special and what puts them in the same category as the best heroes of the classics. The Pevensies aren’t brave or strategic or trained to fight. They’re just four children very far from home during a seemingly endless war. No bombs threaten Zib or Avery except the metaphorical kind, the kind that will come with adulthood as their innocence is lost or stolen and the world wears their bright, sharp edges dull.

=== Book 2 ===
Regina Schroeder of Booklist praised the second entry into the series, writing that McGuire is "creating a series for those who read Oz and wanted more from it." Schroeder felt that the second novel was "a wonderful addition to their story."

=== Book 3 ===
Writing for Booklist, Regina Schroeder wrote that "The intricacies of the Up-and-Under ... continue to be compelling and satisfying in the way of a beloved childhood fable." Publishers Weekly called Into the Windwracked Wilds an "enchanting third installment" in the series. The review criticized the omniscient narrator as "occasionally a little too intrusive" but stated that "the story remains fascinating and provocative."

=== Book 4 ===
Regina Schroeder of Booklist praised the final entry into the series, stating that "It is not only an excellent story on its own, but it does a much better job at ending than L. Frank Baum ever managed."
