= Pzyche =

1982 novel by Amanda Hemingway

Pzyche is a novel by Amanda Hemingway published in 1982.

== Plot summary ==
Pzyche is a novel in which the main character is Pzyche Corazin.

== Reception ==
Dave Langford reviewed Pzyche for White Dwarf #48, and stated that "Hemingway clearly has talent but regards SF as an amusing playground where one needn't work one's talent too hard. [...] A pity: Psyche is fun for all its flaws and I'd like to see this author try SF at full stretch."

== Reviews ==
- Review by John Hobson (1982) in Vector 110
- Review by Colin Greenland (1983) in Interzone, #4 Spring 1983
