= The Song of the Shattered Sands =

The Song of the Shattered Sands is a series of epic fantasy novels written by American author Bradley P. Beaulieu. Starting in 2015 with Twelve Kings in Sharakhai, the series was concluded in 2021 with A Desert Torn Asunder.

Several short stories and novellas set in the world of The Shattered Sands have been published, as well as an additional short novel called Of Sand and Malice Made.

== Plot and setting ==
The six book series primarily takes place in the fictional desert of the Great Shangazi, especially the city of Sharakhai. At the beginning of Twelve Kings in Sharakhai, pit-fighter Çedamihn Ahyanesh'ala gets involved with the Moonless Host, a rebel organization intent on defeating the Twelve Kings who have ruled Sharakhai for more than four hundred years.

- The Twelve Kings are the rulers of the desert city Sharakhai, who have been gifted immortality by the gods of the desert. Twelve poems exist with knowledge about how to get past their gifted powers and kill them.
- Blade Maidens are the daughters of the Kings who train to defend their fathers against the Moonless Host and everyone who threatens their rule.
- The Moonless Host are a rebel organisation with only one goal: to destroy the Kings and restore the Thirteenth Tribe in the desert.

== Reception ==
=== Twelve Kings in Sharakhai ===
Jason Heller of NPR gave the book a starred review, calling it a terrific exception in a world full of epic fantasy filled with old medieval Europe influences. Heller goes on by saying, "Beaulieu has proved himself able to orchestrate massive storylines before, but Twelve Kings lays down even more potential. This book should be ranked amongst the most satisfying."

== Books in the series ==
=== Novels ===
- Twelve Kings in Sharakhai (2015)
- With Blood Upon the Sand (2017)
- A Veil of Spears (2018)
- Beneath the Twisted Trees (2019)
- When Jackals Storm the Walls (2020)
- A Desert Torn Asunder (2021)

An additional book, Of Sand and Malice Made, was published in 2016 and is a prequel to the first novel in the series.

=== Novellas ===
- The Doors at Dusk and Dawn
- In the Village Where Brightwine Flows
- The Tattered Prince and the Demon Veiled
- A Wasteland of My God’s Own Making
- The Flight of the Whisper King
