= Twelve Kings in Sharakhai =

Fantasy book series

- First edition
- Author: Bradley Beaulieu
- Language: English
- Series: The Song of the Shattered Sands
- Genre: fantasy
- Publisher: DAW Books
- Publication date: September 1, 2015
- Publication place: United States
- Media type: Print (hardcover & paperback)
- Pages: 584

Twelve Kings in Sharakhai is the first book in the epic fantasy series The Song of the Shattered Sands by American author Bradley P. Beaulieu. It was published by DAW Books in 2015 and is followed by Blood Upon the Sand (2017), A Veil of Spears (2018), Beneath the Twisted Trees (2019), When Jackals Storm the Walls (2020) and A Desert Torn Asunder (2021).

== Plot introduction ==
For four hundred years, the Twelve Kings of Sharakhai have ruled the Great Shangazi desert. They are immortal, ruthless and powerful. No hope exists of freedom under their oppressive rule. Or so it seems, until Çedamihn Ahyanesh'ala, a brave woman who fights in the fighting pits as the White Wolf, defies the King's laws and goes outside on the holy night of Beht Za'hir and discovers a secret that may well be the end of the Kings.

== Audiobook ==
The unabridged audiobook is read by narrator Sarah Coomes and published by Brilliance Audio in 2015.
