= The Ring of Allaire =

1981 novel

- Cover of first edition
- Author: Susan Dexter
- Cover artist: Laurence Schwinger
- Language: English
- Series: The Winter King's War
- Genre: Fantasy
- Publisher: Del Rey / Ballantine
- Publication date: 1981
- Publication place: United States
- Media type: Print (paperback)
- Pages: 232
- ISBN: 0-345-29273-1
- OCLC: 7908101
- Followed by: The Sword of Calandra

The Ring of Allaire is a fantasy novel by American author Susan Dexter, the first volume in her Winter King's War series. It was first published in paperback by Del Rey / Ballantine in October 1981, and reprinted by the same publisher in November 1982. The first British editions were issued in hardcover and paperback by Collins and Fontana, respectively, in June 1987. The first ebook edition was published by the author in June 2012. The book was reissued as a trade paperback by CreateSpace in July 2012. The novel has also been published in German.

== Plot summary ==
The Ring of Allaire is a novel in which a young apprentice wizard must complete the quest of his master to rescue a princess imprisoned long ago by the ice-lord, after the master is killed.

== Reception ==
Greg Costikyan reviewed The Ring of Allaire in Ares Magazine #12 and commented that "competently written, but with nothing new to say [...] Light entertainment. So, now what?"

The novel was also reviewed by Don D'Ammassa (1986) in Science Fiction Chronicle, #80 May 1986
