= The Wish Giver =

1983 book by Bill Brittain

- Paperback cover
- Author: Bill Brittain
- Illustrator: Andrew Glass
- Language: English
- Genre: Children's book
- Publisher: Harper & Row
- Publication date: 1983
- Publication place: United States
- Media type: Print (Hardcover and Paperback)
- Pages: 181 pp
- ISBN: 0-06-020686-1 (First edition)
- OCLC: 9080819
- LC Class: PZ7.B78067 Wi 1983

The Wish Giver: Three Tales of Coven Tree is a 1983 children's book by Bill Brittain. The "wish giver" in the title refers to the enigmatic man who gives three children a wish to make their deepest dreams come true, but the wishes are not worded carefully, and go horribly wrong.

The Wish Giver was the recipient of a Newbery Honor in 1984.

== Plot summary ==
=== Prologue ===
The narrator, Stewart Meade (nicknamed "Stew Meat"), meets a strange man named Thaddeus Blinn in a carnival tent and notices something unusual about him. Stew Meat sees that there are three children in the tent who he recognizes as Polly, Rowena, and Adam. Blinn sells each of them a card with a red spot in the middle, for only 50 cents each, explaining that all they have to do is to press their finger on the spot, make a wish out loud, and it will come true – exactly as they word it.

=== Jug-A-Rum ===
Polly, an 11-year-old girl, loves to play with bullfrogs and her only two friends. She wishes to be popular, and have the school's two most popular girls, Agatha and Eunice, to like her and invite her over for a tea party in which they would pretend to talk like real ladies. Polly's wish is granted, causing her to croak like a frog when she says vain, mean words about other people. Her sudden croaking in the middle of class causes her to become the center of attention and mockery at school. Agatha and Eunice invite her over, but she learns during her visit that they are snobbish and unlikable people, and only invited her to ridicule her for her croaking. She realizes that her habit of gossiping and talking about her classmates behind their backs has kept them from befriending her.

=== The Tree Man ===
Rowena wishes that Henry Piper, a traveling salesman she is infatuated with, but only sees two times a year, will "set roots down in Coven Tree and never leave again!". Her wish is fulfilled word-for-word: Henry's feet become rooted to the ground and he gradually transforms into a sycamore tree. Rowena finds that Henry never really loved her and only pretended to so that her father would like more of his items. She also develops a liking for the family's farmhand, Sam Waxman, who helps her throughout the situation with Henry.

=== Water, Water, Everywhere ===
Adam lives on a farm that requires water to be brought in every few days, mostly by Adam himself, so he wishes for it to be covered with water as far as the eye can see. The next day, he is taught dowsing and finds the dowsing rod reacting at every turn. When he digs through the soil, a huge geyser shoots out which initially causes his parents, Edward and Sarah, to be joyful. However, the geyser grows out of control, flooding the entire farm.

=== Epilogue ===
Adam, Polly, and Rowena run to Stew Meat, asking him to fix their wishes, since he has the only other wishing card in Coven Tree. Stew Meat accepts and grants all their wishes. Polly no longer says mean things about other people and thus never croaks again; Henry is restored to human form, but Rowena forgets him and dates Sam instead; and Adam travels around the world to dowse.

== Reception ==
Critical release of The Wish Giver upon release was favorable. Common elements of praise centered on Brittain's writing style and the book's illustrations.

Kirkus Reviews described it as "another entertaining tale of magic and transformation." and "Brittain's knack for old-fashioned, funny-scary storytelling makes this another playfully atmospheric tale of strange doings in yesterday's New England."
