= The Dragon's Familiar =

2008 novel by Lawrence Cohen

- Author: Lawrence Cohen
- Cover artist: Lawrence Cohen
- Language: English
- Genre: Fantasy
- Publisher: iUniverse.com
- Publication date: November 2008
- Publication place: United States of America
- Media type: Print (hardcover, paperback)
- Pages: 232
- ISBN: 978-0-595-63430-9

The Dragon's Familiar is a fantasy novel by Lawrence Jeffrey Cohen.

== Plot summary ==
The novel tells the story of Cory Avalon, an orphan who is lured through an enchanted gateway disguised as a mirror, and ends up in the magical world of Abydonne. Cory meets Prince Taliesin of Caer Dathyl and is adopted by his father King Llewellyn, who makes Cory the apprentice of the royal wizard, Math the Ancient.

Early in his apprenticeship, Cory casts a spell to summon and bond with a familiar, and a young golden dragon named Benythonne answers Cory's incantation. The resulting bond grants Cory enormous strength and the ability to fly, as well as amplifying his raw magical power. Math suspects Cory may be the long-prophecised archwizard who will free humanity from the demon threat, and sends Cory to learn from Vainamoinen, another wizard.

After several months, Cory learns that Vainamoinen is his natural grandfather, and Abydonne was the world of his father's birth. Harkening to the ancient prophecy, Cory acknowledges his duty as the prince of wizards, and he sets out to free the captive humans from the demons and destroy their mountain stronghold of Abyolldd. Along the way, the young wizard is joined by a group of Math's apprentices, and together they set out for the dark mountain.

Cory frees the slaves and has Benythonne and the other apprentices lead the slaves to safety, while Cory battles Asmodeus the Demon Lord alone. During the magical combat, one of Cory's mystic bolts strikes the mirror gateway to Earth, shattering it. The resulting shockwaves bring down the entire mountain, and Cory escapes with his life by teleporting away to his dragon, safely outside Abyolldd.

== Background ==
The original manuscript was Lawrence J. Cohen's senior project for his bachelor's degree in Creative Writing from New Jersey University, and is his first published novel. The author based his novel on Welsh and Finnish folklore. The cover artwork, "On A Dare," was an oil painting also completed by the author, and hangs on his living room wall.

== Reception ==
The novel received positive reviews by Children's Bookwatch and Midwest Book Review.
