= Seasonal Fears =

2022 novel by Seanan McGuire

- Author: Seanan McGuire
- Language: English
- Series: Alchemical Journeys
- Release number: 2
- Genre: Fantasy
- Publisher: Tor Books
- Publication date: 3 May 2022
- Publication place: United States
- Pages: 476
- ISBN: 9781250768254
- Preceded by: Middlegame
- Followed by: Tidal Creatures

Seasonal Fears is a 2022 novel by Seanan McGuire. It is the second book in McGuire's Alchemical Journeys series, following Middlegame.

== Plot ==
Best friends Melanie and Harry grow up together in the early 2000s. Melanie has a heart defect and is not expected to live past young adulthood. Her boyfriend Harry is her constant protector. Melanie's father Roland is an alchemist who has engineered Melanie to have an affinity for Winter.

When the previous King of Winter and Queen of Summer die, a girl named Jack Frost comes to Melanie. Jack explains that Melanie and Harry are candidates to become the new Winter Queen and Summer King, respectively. Melanie's twin sister Aven, who supposedly died at birth but has been kept alive by their father's alchemy, is another candidate for the Summer Throne. Melanie and Harry run away from home. Aven kills Roland and pursues them.

The candidates are drawn toward a labyrinth where they will compete for the seasonal crowns. Melanie's physical health worsens, but her connection to Winter makes her unexpectedly strong and gives her a ruthless streak. Simultaneously, Harry's growing connection to Summer makes him more protective of Melanie and increases his temper and aggression. As the contest progresses, only one candidate for each throne can remain alive. Melanie and Harry are repeatedly attacked by other candidates for the thrones; they fight back, killing or injuring the other contenders. Along their journey, Melanie and Harry meet Roger, Dodger, and Erin in Berkeley. (After the events of Middlegame, Roger and Dodger were able to reset the timeline to save Erin, but there was no timeline in which Erin and Darren both survived). Harry and Melanie enter the labyrinth and claim the crowns, becoming the next seasonal monarchs. In a final bid to survive, Aven attacks them, and they kill her.

== Reception ==
Regina Schroeder of Booklist recommended the novel for young adult readers, calling it "a fitting return to McGuire's magical, alchemical world." Schroeder also commented that the story is "an epic road trip novel" and "a meditation on the consequences of personifying nature."

Publishers Weekly called the novel "an intricate, dense companion to 2020's Middlegame". The review states that the complex premise and worldbuilding are "held together by Harry and Melanie’s unwavering partnership". The review concludes that Seasonal Fears is "a worthy, highly intelligent, wholly satisfying expansion of the Middlegame mythos that will leave readers wanting more".
