= Kandide and the Secret of the Mists =

Debut novel of Diana S. Zimmerman

- Paperback edition cover
- Author: Diana S. Zimmerman
- Cover artist: Maxine Gadd
- Language: English
- Series: The Calabiyau Chronicles
- Genre: Fantasy
- Publisher: Noesis Publishing
- Publication date: 2008
- Publication place: United States
- Media type: Print (Hardback & Paperback)
- Pages: 289 pp (hardcover edition)
- ISBN: 0-9794328-3-9 (hardcover edition)
- Followed by: Kandide and the Lady’s Revenge

Kandide and the Secret of the Mists (2008) is the first novel by American author Diana S. Zimmerman and the first book in the Calabiyau Chronicles trilogy. The fantasy novel, set in the fairy kingdom of Calabiyau, relates the story of Princess Kandide's banishment to the Veil of the Mists, her struggle to survive, and her family's efforts to bring her home.

== Plot summary ==
As the beginning of the story, all is well in the Kingdom of Calabiyau. King Toeyad, ruler of the Fée, a race of fairies, is benevolent and just, and the twelve clans of fairies live in relative peace. When the king dies, his teenage daughter, Kandide, is expected to ascend to the throne. While preparing for her coronation, one of Kandide's wings is crushed. The Fée value beauty above all else and so, to prevent the disgrace of having an “Imperfect” take the throne, Kandide's mother banishes her to the Veil of the Mists, a land to the East populated by treacherous creatures and imperfect Fée. Without a clear heir to the throne, Calabiyau is thrown into turmoil. Kandide's mother is put in mortal danger and cruel Lady Aron threatens to take the throne. Kandide's younger sister, Tara, and brother, Teren, are sent to find Kandide and bring her home in hopes that she can set everything right.

== Kandide ==
Kandide, the title character of the novel, is a Fée—a race of fairies who live in the Kingdom of Calabiyau. Kandide is also a princess, the eldest daughter of King Toeyad, ruler of Calabiyau Proper. First in line to inherit the throne, Kandide grows up spoiled and vain, having had her every whim attended to. Her vanity is encouraged by the other Fée, who consider her to be the personification of perfection until an accident leaves one of her wings crushed beyond repair. Now “imperfect,” Kandide is forced to come to terms with her disfigurement and find value beyond physical beauty.

== Reception ==
Zimmerman was initially unable to find a publisher for the novel, and thus resorted to self-publishing; sales were high enough that in 2010, the novel was republished by Scholastic Books, which made it a featured selection for their book club in September of that year.

== Artwork ==
Zimmerman was inspired to write Kandide and the Secret of the Mists in part by a painting by artist Maxine Gadd who, in turn, was asked to illustrate the novel. Zimmerman felt that Gadd's illustrations were so important to the enjoyment of the novel, she insisted that they be published in full color in the hardcover edition.
