= David Keck =

Canadian author and teacher

- Born: Winnipeg, Manitoba, Canada
- Occupations: Novelist, Teacher
- Spouse: Kate Brallier
- Writing career
- Period: 1996–present
- Genre: Fantasy
- Website: keckbooks.com

David Keck is a Canadian author, and teacher, who has master's degrees in English Literature, History, and Education. He is best known for his novels featuring protagonist Durand Col. His works have received generally positive reviews from critics, yet have not reached the mainstream so far.

== Biography ==
David Keck was born in, and grew up in, Winnipeg, Manitoba, Canada. Whilst living in Winnipeg he attended the University of Winnipeg, where he got master's degrees in English Literature, History, and Education. He subsequently moved to the UK to get a master's degree in Creative Writing from the University of Sussex. In 2004, he moved to New York City, America, to marry Kate Brallier (an author herself), and to teach middle school in New York's Washington Heights.

== Works ==
Keck's novels all recount the adventures of protagonist Durand Col, yet there is currently no series name. The first novel in the series was In the Eye of Heaven, and was published in the UK in 2006, and the US and Canada in 2007, by Tor. The novel went through many versions before publication, with fellow Canadian author, Steven Erikson, having a hand in reading and editing the drafts. Keck's writing style has been compared to Erikson, mainly because he likes to go against the grain. He says that he "flinch[es] at an elf who's a dab hand with a longbow. Conventions and clichés: it's all in the smiles and cringes."

== Bibliography ==
=== Novels ===
==== The Tales of Durand ====
- Book One: In the Eye of Heaven (2006)
- Book Two: In A Time of Treason (2008)
- Book Three: A King in Cobwebs, Tor Books, 2018
