= Wayne Thomas Batson =

American author (born 1968))

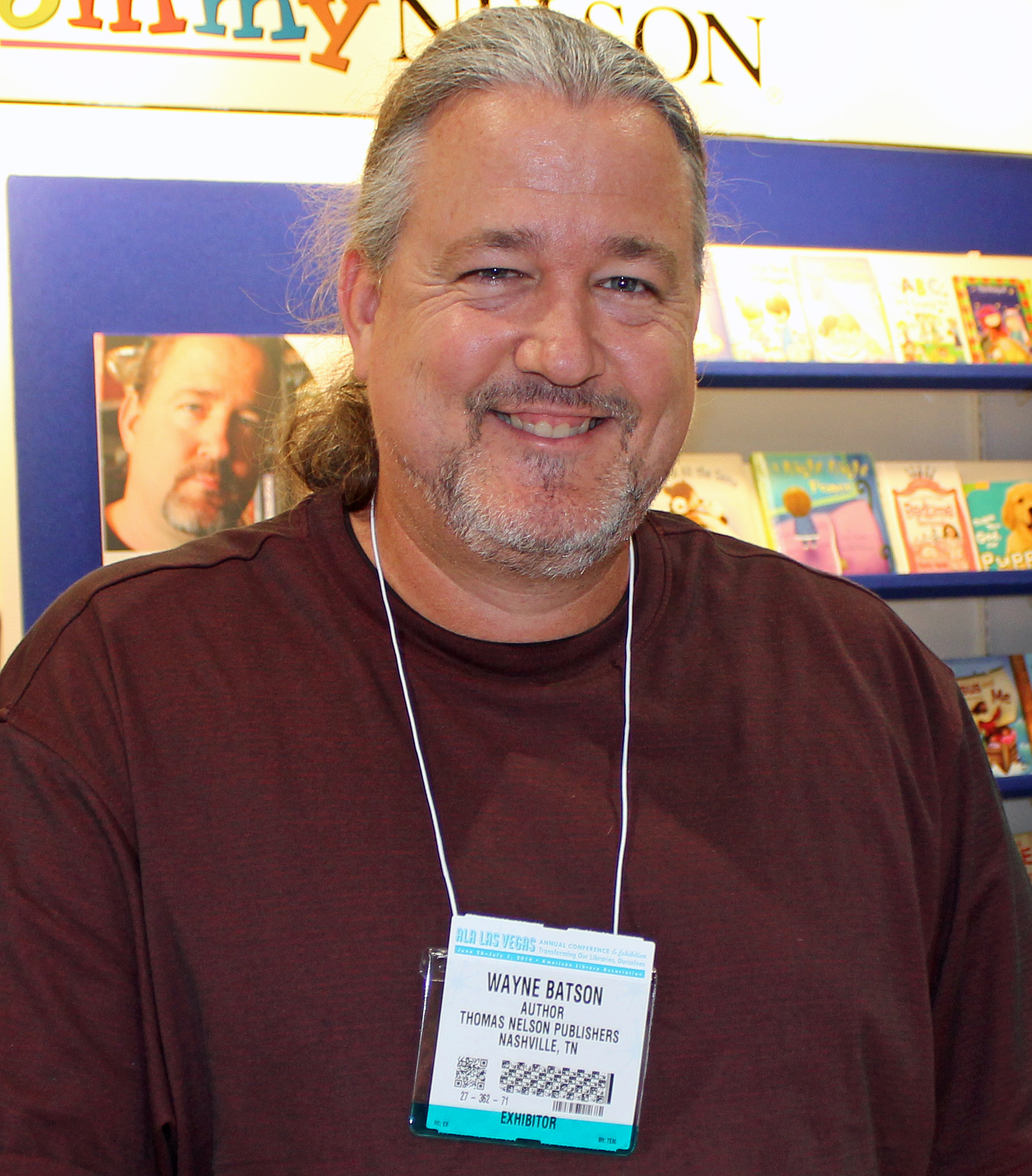
- Batson in 2014 at the American Library Association's Annual Conference & Exhibition in Las Vegas
- Born: 1968 (age 57–58) Seabrook, Maryland
- Occupation: Writer; teacher
- Language: English
- Education: Occidental College (attended); University of Maryland, College Park (BA); Bowie State University (MA)
- Genre: Fantasy
- Notable works: The Door Within
- Spouse: Mary Lu
- Children: 4

Website
- enterthedoorwithin.blogspot.com

Wayne Thomas Batson (born 1968) is an American author and middle school teacher. He wrote the Christian fantasy trilogy The Door Within.

== Biography ==
Wayne Thomas Batson was born in 1968 in Seabrook, Maryland. He studied English at the University of Maryland, College Park, where he received a bachelor's degree. Batson then received a master's degree from Bowie State University.

Starting around 1990, Batson taught reading and English at Folly Quarter Middle School in Ellicott City, Maryland. While he write books for The Door Within, a Christian fantasy trilogy published by Thomas Nelson, he shared excerpts with his students to get their opinion about whether they found the writing to be engaging or dull. He wrote the novels Isle of Swords (2007) and Isle of Fire (2008) about the involvement of some Caribbean pirates with a group of monks. By 2022, Batson had written 17 novels that had more than 500,000 sales.

== Personal life ==
Batson is married to Mary Lu. They have four children.
