= Bradley Beaulieu =

American fantasy writer

Bradley P. Beaulieu
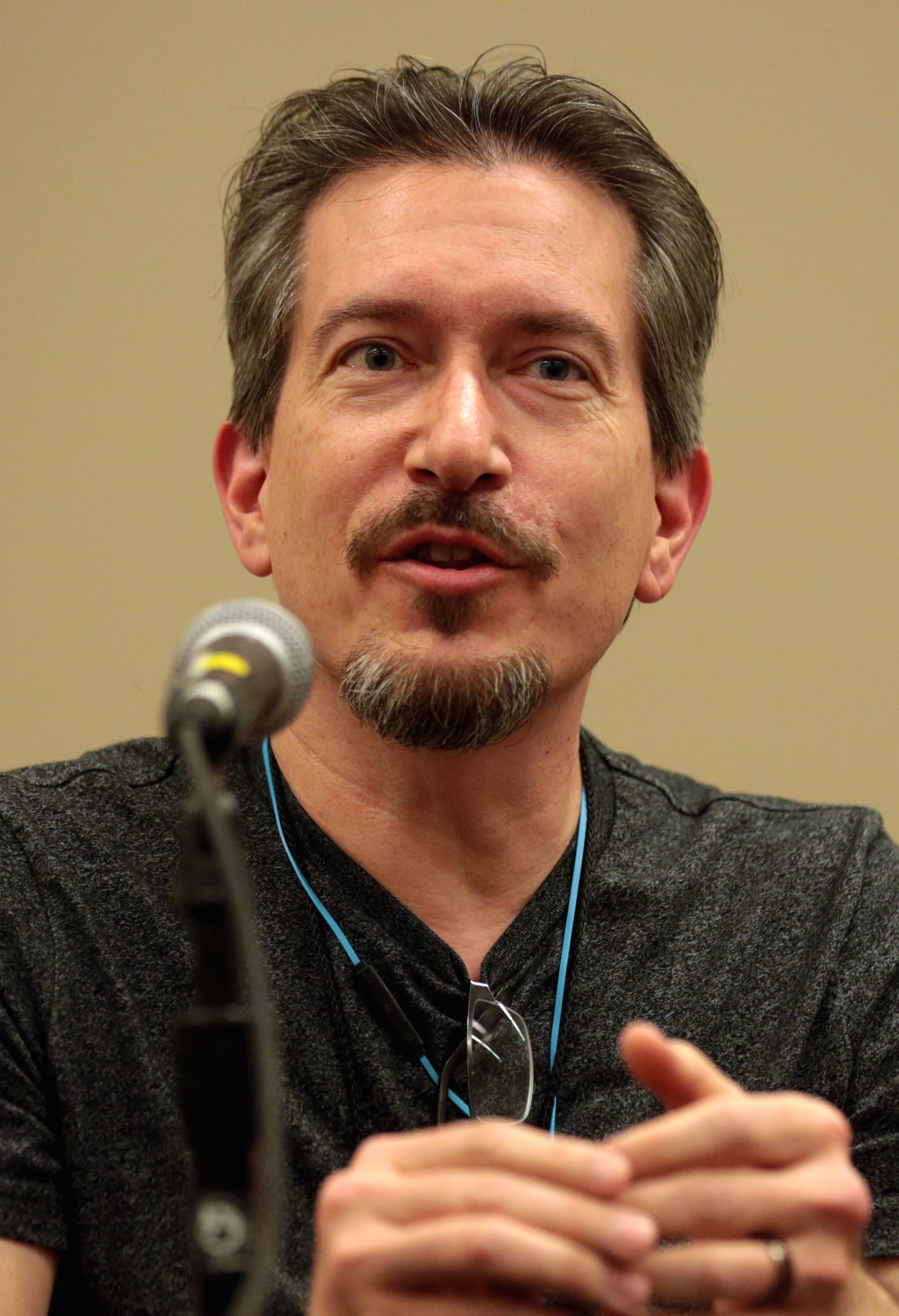
- Writing career
- Period: 2011–present
- Genre: Fantasy
- Notable works: Twelve Kings in Sharakhai; The Winds of Khalakovo
- Website: quillings.com

Bradley P. Beaulieu is an American author of epic fantasy. He is best known for his series The Lays of Anuskaya, which he finished in 2013 with the publication of The Flames of Shadam Khoreh. In 2015 Beaulieu published Twelve Kings in Sharakhai, the first novel in his series The Song of the Shattered Sands.

Beaulieu started writing in college and has since been nominated for several awards, including the Gemmell Morningstar Award for The Winds of Khalakovo. He dedicated himself to the craft, learning under the guidance of writers like Nancy Kress, Joe Haldeman, Tim Powers, Holly Black, Michael Swanwick, Kij Johnson, and many more.

== Bibliography ==
=== The Lays of Anuskaya ===
- The Winds of Khalakovo (Night Shade Books) April 2011
- The Straits of Galahesh (Night Shade Books) April 2012
- The Flames of Shadam Khoreh (Quillings Literary) April 2013

=== The Song of the Shattered Sands ===
- Twelve Kings in Sharakhai (DAW Books US, Gollancz UK) 2015
- Of Sand and Malice Made (DAW Books US, Gollancz UK) 2016
- With Blood Upon the Sand (DAW Books US, Gollancz UK) 2017
- A Veil of Spears (DAW Books US, Gollancz UK) 2018
- Beneath the Twisted Trees (DAW Books US, Gollancz UK) 2019
- When Jackals Storm the Walls (DAW Books US, Gollancz UK) 2020
- A Desert Torn Asunder (DAW Books US, Gollancz UK) 2021

=== The Book of the Holt ===
- The Dragons of Deepwood Fen (DAW Books US, Bloomsbury UK) 2023
- A God of Countless Guises (DAW Books US, Bloomsbury UK) 2026

=== Novellas ===
- The Doors at Dusk and Dawn
- In the Village Where Brightwine Flows
- The Tattered Prince and the Demon Veiled
- A Wasteland of My God’s Own Making
- The Flight of the Whispher King
- The Last Days of Old Sharakhai

=== Co-written ===
- The Burning Light, with Rob Ziegler (2016)
- Strata, with Stephen Gaskell (2011)
