= The Sorceress and the Cygnet =

Fantasy novel

- Cover of first edition
- Author: Patricia A. McKillip
- Cover artist: Romas
- Language: English
- Series: Cygnet series
- Genre: Fantasy
- Publisher: Ace Books
- Publication date: 1991
- Publication place: United States
- Media type: Print (hardcover)
- Pages: 231
- ISBN: 0-441-77564-0
- Followed by: The Cygnet and the Firebird

The Sorceress and the Cygnet is a fantasy novel by Patricia A. McKillip. It was first published in hardcover by Ace Books in May 1991, with a paperback edition following from the same publisher in January 1992. The first British edition was published in hardcover and trade paperback by Pan Books in June 1991, with a standard paperback edition following from the same publisher in May 1992. It was subsequently combined with its sequel The Cygnet and the Firebird into the omnibus collection Cygnet, issued in trade paperback by Ace Books in March 2007.

== Summary ==
Corleu of the Wayfolk stands out from his kin due to his blond hair and obsession with his people's myths, according to which a war was once fought between the Cygnet, the Gold King, the Blind Lady, the Dancer, and the Warlock, resulting in the Cygnet's victory and the others' exile. These characters are now commemorated in the constellations and the patron signs of the regional hold settlements. Today, the sign of the Cygnet is borne by Ro Holding, and the remaining signs by the other holdings under its rule.

When Corleu and his companions, including his beloved Tiel, are bespelled and trapped in a timeless swamp, his knowledge enables him to cross into the parallel world where the mythic figures exist and seek help. Meeting a tinker who is actually the fearsome Gold King, he is tasked with seeking the Heart of the Cygnet, which he is told might release his people from their limbo. The King's true motive is to free his ancient allies and turn the tables on the Cygnet in their age-old war.

With the aid of the sorceress Nyx Ro, estranged heir to Ro Holding, whom he must keep ignorant of his goal, Corleu begins his journey. He encounters the Fire Bear in its lair, catches the Blood Fox by its shadow, and evades a female warrior, Meguet, whose fate seems bound with his. At each step of the journey another legendary character is awakened; the Blind Lady, the Dancer, and the Warlock.

The Ro clan works against the questers, aware that if the Gold King prevails and the Cygnet falls, the balance keeping peace among the holds will be upset, and all who live will be doomed. Their efforts are continually countered by the wily king, and all the players gather for the endgame in a final confrontation at Ro Holding, Nyx's home.

== Reception ==
Sybil Steinberg in Publishers Weekly notes that "[w]ith strong, archetypal characters and a powerful command of symbolism, McKillip ... depicts the human conflict between the desire for power and the need for love. Inspired imagery and a perfectly paced plot mark this fantasy as one of the year's best."

Kirkus Reviews calls the novel "a subtle, well-crafted tale redolent of magic and mystery, in which mythic figures are made flesh, and mortals are conscripted for an otherworldly contest. ... The prose is rich, without wordiness; the background mythology (only hinted at here) is original, tantalizing, and convincing. Winner of the World Fantasy Award, McKillip knows what so many other fantasy writers do not, or have forgotten: less is more."

Jackie Cassada in Library Journal praises the book for its "imaginative worldbuilding, strong male and female characters, and an intense (though sometimes esoteric) style."

Delia Sherman in The New York Review of Science Fiction calls it "[b]eautifully written ... lyrical and humorous ... rich, evocative prose."

Barbara Rickards in Magill Book Reviews writes that "McKillip has created a world where passing time, real and imaginary, encircles itself, like the age rings of a tree. ... This is a tale spun with stunning and powerful imagery [that] will keep the reader enthralled, and not even Corleu will be able to break the spell McKillip casts."

Grace Baun in School Library Journal notes that the book "is not a simple novel" and that "[t]he intricately woven plot laced with surrealist qualities will appeal to mature fantasy lovers."

The book was also reviewed by Tom Whitmore and Carolyn Cushman in Locus no. 363, April 1991, Andy Sawyer in Paperback Inferno no. 91, August/September 1991, Jim England in Vector no. 163, October/November 1991, Baird Searles in Isaac Asimov's Science Fiction Magazine v. 15, no. 14, December 1991, Alan Stewart in SF Commentary no. 71/72, April 1992, and Jessica Yates in Vector no. 171, February/March 1993.

== Awards ==
The novel was nominated for the 1992 Mythopoeic Fantasy Award for Adult Literature, and placed twelfth in the 1992 Locus Poll Award for Best Fantasy Novel.
