= Bill Brittain =

American novelist

William E. Brittain (December 16, 1930 – December 16, 2011) was an American writer. He is best known for work set in the fictional New England village of Coven Tree, including The Wish Giver, a Newbery Honor Book.

Brittain was born in Rochester, New York. He decided he wanted to be a 5th-grade teacher, and in addition to teaching, used to read stories in mystery magazines. After some time, he decided he could do as good a job at writing as some of the authors he read; he got coaching on writing from Frederic Dannay of Ellery Queen's Mystery Magazine (in which, along with Alfred Hitchcock's Mystery Magazine, most of his mystery stories were published). He wrote two serials from 1964 to 1983, as well as other stories, before moving on to the children's books for which he is better known.

Brittain is also the author of the popular book All the Money in the World, which was adapted as a 1983 movie.

== Books ==
=== Coven Tree series ===
- Devil's Donkey (1981)
- The Wish Giver: three tales of Coven Tree (1983)
- Dr. Dredd's Wagon of Wonders (1987)
- Professor Popkin's Prodigious Polish: a tale of Coven Tree (1990)

=== The Man who Read short stories ===
- The Man Who Read John Dickson Carr (1965)
- The Man Who Read Ellery Queen (1965)
- The Woman Who Read Rex Stout (1966)
- The Boy Who Read Agatha Christie (1966)
- The Man Who Read Sir Arthur Conan Doyle (1969)
- The Man Who Read G. K. Chesterton (1973)
- The Man Who Read Dashiell Hammett (1974)
- The Man Who Read Georges Simenon (1975)
- The Girl Who Read John Creasey (1975)
- The Men Who Read Isaac Asimov (1978)

=== Mr. Strang short stories ===
- Mr Strang Takes a Field Trip (1968)
- Mr Strang Sees a Play (1968)
- Mr. Strang Checks a Record (1972)
- Mr. Strang and the Cat Lady (1975)
- Mr. Strang performs an experiment (1975)
- Mr. Strang Accepts a Challenge (1976)
- Mr. Strang Unlocks a Door (1981)
- Mr. Strang Grasps at Straws (1981)
- Mr. Strang Interprets a Picture (1981)
- Mr. Strang and the Lost Ship (1982)
- Mr. Strang Takes a Partner (1982)
- Mr. Strang Studies Exhibit A (1982)
- Mr. Strang and the Purloined Memo (1983)
- Mr. Strang Takes a Tour (1983)
- Mr. Strang Picks Up The Pieces (1988)
- Mr. Strang Examines a Legend (1973)
- Mr. Strang Invents a Strange Device (1973)
- Mr. Strang Discovers a Bug (1973)

=== Other ===
- The Zaretski Chain (1968)
- The Ferret Man (1977)
- All The Money In The World (1979)
- Sherlock Holmes, Master Detective (1982)
- Who Knew There'd Be Ghosts? (1985)
- The Fantastic Freshman (1988)
- My Buddy, The King (1989)
- Wings (1991)
- The Ghost From Beneath The Sea (1992)
- The Mystery Of The Several Sevens (1994)
- Shape-Changer (1994)
- The Wizards And The Monster (1994)
