= Sirius (magazine) =

Croatian science fiction magazine

- Editor: Borivoj Jurković, Hrvoje Prćić, Milivoj Pašiček
- Categories: science fiction
- Format: Digest size
- Publisher: Vjesnik
- Total circulation: 164 + special edition
- Founded: 1976
- Final issue: 1989
- Country: SR Croatia, Yugoslavia (today Croatia)
- Based in: Zagreb
- Language: Serbo-Croatian

Sirius was a Yugoslavian science fiction magazine from Zagreb, SR Croatia, Yugoslavia (today Croatia). It was named after the brightest star in the sky, seen from Earth. It was published by the Zagreb newspaper and publishing house Vjesnik from 1976 to 1989. The magazine stopped circulating in 1990.

The foundation was proposed by the Croatian writer Damir Mikuličić in 1976. Mikuličić also gave the name to the magazine, and in the first years of Sirius' publication, he was one of its reviewers.

Numerous works by domestic authors have been published in Sirius, as well as translations by foreign science fiction authors. In addition, theoretical papers, reviews, and other contributions were published. The period of Sirius' publication is considered to be the golden period of science fiction literature in Croatia and Yugoslavia.

Culturally, Sirius played a key role in the high quality and development of the science fiction genre in Croatia and the entire SFRY, causing an explosion of science fiction novels, short stories, miniatures, and the popularization of this genre in Croatia and Yugoslavia in general. It is also significant that for a long time this paper was the only place where domestic works of science fiction could be published regularly, and it was a springboard for many later famous science fiction writers.

The first editor of Sirius was Borivoj Jurković. During his leadership, Sirius reached a circulation of about 40,000 copies, gaining great attention abroad. It received awards in Stresa (1980) and Brighton (1984) for the best European science fiction magazine and the European SF Association Award (1986).

== Editors ==
- Borivoj Jurković
- Hrvoje Prćić
- Milivoj Pašiček

== See also ==
- Croatian science fiction
- Futura (science fiction magazine)
