= An Awfully Beastly Business =

Children's book series

- The cover of Werewolf versus Dragon, the first novel in the An Awfully Beastly Business series
- Werewolf versus Dragon (2008); Sea Monsters and Other Delicacies (2008); Bang Goes a Troll (2009); The Jungle Vampire (2009); Battle of the Zombies (2010); The Big Beast Sale (2011)
- Author: David Sinden, Matthew Morgan, and Guy Macdonald
- Illustrator: Jonny Duddle
- Country: United States
- Language: English
- Genre: Fantasy, children's literature
- Publisher: Simon & Schuster
- Published: 2008–2011
- Media type: Print (hardcover, paperback)
- No. of books: 6

An Awfully Beastly Business is a series of fantasy books for children published between 2008 and 2011. Written collaboratively by David Sinden, Matthew Morgan, and Guy Macdonald and illustrated by Jonny Duddle, the series follows the adventures a werewolf named Ulf. He and many other endangered beasts live under the protection of the Royal Society for the Prevention of Cruelty to Beasts (RSPCB), a society founded by the late Professor Farraway. Ulf is an RSPCB apprentice who works with his companions the giant Orson, the fairy Tiana, and the veterinarian Dr. Fielding to prevent the antagonist poachers from capturing the beasts.

== Background ==
Simon & Schuster released the first two books in the series, Werewolf versus Dragon and Sea Monsters and Other Delicacies, on July 7, 2008. By 2009, the books had been translated into 20 languages. Sinden, Morgan, and Macdonald had attended The Judd School where they first got to know each other. They gathered in multiple places to write the books such as at the Cornish coast, in a caravan parked in Sinden's garden, and the St Julians club in Sevenoaks. The authors drew on Knole Park to portray the Royal Society for the Prevention of Cruelty to Beasts' headquarters. The Morning Call found An Awfully Beastly Business to be "a fantastic series for children ages 8-12".

== Books ==
- (Book 1) Werewolf versus Dragon (2008)
- (Book 2) Sea Monsters and Other Delicacies (2008)
- (Book 3) Bang Goes a Troll (2009)
- (Book 4) The Jungle Vampire (2009)
- (Book 5) Battle of the Zombies (2010)
- (Book 6) The Big Beast Sale (2011)

The Sunday Mail called Werewolf versus Dragon "a gripping adventure story". Regarding the first two books in the series, Kirkus Reviews said, "Fans of Philip Ardagh's yarns or Cressida Cowell's dragon tales will happily sink their claws into these." Of Sea Monsters and Other Delicacies, Walter Minkel wrote in School Library Journal, "This volume is very much like the first, including the shallow characters and predictable plot. The idea behind the series--a nature preserve for fantastic beasts--is intriguing, but it is not well carried out." Shoshanna Flax of The Horn Book Magazine commented on Bang Goes a Troll, "Pen-and-ink drawings effectively combine the humorous with the sinister."

Sunday Mail book reviewer Vicky Edwards said of The Jungle Vampire, "Expect the unexpected. It's a great read." The Horn Book Magazine's Shoshanna Flax stated about The Jungle Empire, "As usual, the series balances dark situations with absurdity. Angular pen-and-ink illustrations play up the story's humor." In a review of the audiobook version of The Jungle Empire, Amy Olson wrote in the School Library Journal, "Gerard Doyle's vocal talents and character depiction enhance the tale, helping to maintain the intensity and mystery of the story throughout. A good choice for fantasy fans and youngsters with short attention spans."

== Characters ==
- Ulf – An orphaned werewolf raised by Dr. Fielding. He is the main protagonist of the series and even though his actions get him into risky situations, he is willing to prove his worth.
- Tiana – A small woodland fairy who can't stand violence and is willing to lend a helping wing.
- Orson – A mountain giant who aids the group.
- Dr. Helen Fielding – The doctor/vet at the RSPCB, who is kind to Ulf, Tiana, and the legendary beasts.
- Druce – A mischievous gargoyle who lives with Ulf.
- Professor Farraway – The founder of the RSPCB. He died many years ago and is now a ghost.
- Baron Marackai – A beast hunter and the main antagonist. He is the RSPCB's archenemy. Marackai is charged with beast cruelty and is also Professor Farraway's son.
- Blud and Bone – Baron Marackai's henchmen.
- Chef Franco Ravioli – Another enemy Ulf and his friends face. He is a wicked chef who captures sea monsters to cook them and works for Baron Marackai.
