= Roseanne A. Brown =

Ghanaian American writer

- Born: August 26, 1995 (age 31); Kumasi, Ghana
- Education: University of Maryland
- Occupation: Writer
- Writing career
- Period: 2019–present
- Genres: Fantasy; science fiction
- Notable work: A Song of Wraiths and Ruin
- Website: roseanneabrown.com

Roseanne A. Brown (born August 26, 1995) is a Ghanaian American writer of fantasy, science fiction and young adult fiction. She is best known for her debut novel A Song of Wraiths and Ruin, which became a New York Times best seller, and its sequel, A Psalm of Storms and Silence.

== Early life ==
Roseanne A. Brown was born in Kumasi, Ghana to two Ghanaian parents; her mother is from the Akan tribe. She immigrated when she was three years old along with her family to the United States. As a child, she started writing stories and listened to several West African folktales including that of Anansi narrated by her parents. Brown graduated from the University of Maryland with a Bachelor's degree in Journalism and was also a teaching assistant for the school's Jiménez-Porter Writers’ House program. Brown has written many journalistic work for several outlets including Voice of America.

== Career ==
Brown's debut novel inspired by her Ghanaian heritage and West African folktales, A Song of Wraiths and Ruin was published in 2020 by HarperCollins. It was a Kirkus Reviews best book of 2020 and a New York Times best seller. It garnered generally positive receptions. It was followed by a sequel; A Psalm of Storms and Silence which was published in November 2021

In 2021, it was announced that Rick Riordan Presents had acquired the right to publish Serwa Boateng’s Guide to Vampire Hunting, the first book in Brown's second fantasy series based on Akan mythology. It was released on September 6, 2022.

Other Works

In December 2021, Marvel announced that Brown alongside illustrators Dika Araújo, Natacha Bustos and Claudia Aguirre will be writing an original graphic novel based on the Black Panther titled Shuri and T'Challa: Into the Heartlands. It was released on April 19, 2022.

== Bibliography ==
- A Song of Wraiths and Ruin (2020 Balzer + Bray)
- A Psalm of Storms and Silence (2021, Balzer + Bray)
- Shuri and T'Challa: Into the Heartlands (2022, Marvel)
- Serwa Boateng’s Guide to Vampire Hunting (2022, Rick Riordan Presents)
