= Oscar Pill =

Book series by Thierry Serfaty

Oscar Pill is a series of fantasy novels by Eli Anderson, alias Thierry Serfaty. The characters in the series are sorcerers called Medicus that can penetrate inside the human body. The series currently includes seven volumes with the seventh having been published on 1 June 2016. The series was the winner of the 2011 Teen Readers' Prize. Elle noted "Eli Anderson is the Jules Verne of today. Oscar Pill is exciting! A staggering plot!"
