= Elenium =

Elenium may refer to the following:

- Elenium, a metal band from Vantaa, Finland.
- The Elenium, a series of fantasy novels by David Eddings.
