= James Barclay =

British high fantasy author

James Barclay (born 15 March 1965) is a British high fantasy author who has written multiple series including Chronicles of the Raven and Legends of the Raven. The Bookseller has called him "One of the UK's most popular genre fantasy authors."

== Biography ==
=== Early life ===
Barclay was born in Felixstowe, Suffolk in 1965. He attended Sheffield City Polytechnic. Prior to his breakthrough as an author in 2004, Barclay worked as an actor and a policeman. He was also an advertising manager for a financial investment company.

=== Writing career ===
Barclay said his main inspirations as a writer were David Gemmell and the novel The Legacy of Heorot by Larry Niven, Jerry Pournelle, and Steven Barnes. A reviewer has since compared his work with Gemmell's. An origin story of the company of The Raven entitled "Or So Legend Has It" appears in the 2013 short story collection Legends: Stories in Honour of David Gemmell.

== Works ==
=== Chronicles of the Raven series ===
- Dawnthief. Gollancz, 2002.
- Noonshade. Pyr, 2009.
- Nightchild. Pyr, 2009.

=== Legends of the Raven series ===
- Elfsorrow. Pyr, 2010.
- Shadowheart. Pyr, 2010.
- Demonstorm. Pyr, 2011.
- Ravensoul. Gollancz, 2008.

=== Elves series ===
- Once Walked with Gods.Gollancz, 2010.
- Rise of the TaiGethen. Gollancz, 2012.
- Beyond the Mists of Katura. Gollancz, 2013.

=== The Ascendants of Estorea series ===
- Cry of the Newborn. Orion Publishing Group, 2005.
- A Shout for the Dead. Gollancz, 2006.

=== Other novels ===
- Heart of Granite (Gollancz, 2016)
- The Queen's Assassin (Gollancz, 2022)
