= Ingersoll Rand Industrial Technologies =

- Industry: manufacturer of rotary screw compressors, compressed air solutions, air tools, lifting and material handling devices, air motors, blowers
- Founded: 1871
- Headquarters: United States, Davidson, North Carolina
- Key people: Robert Zafarti,
- Revenue: $2,485.2 million USD (2010)
- Operating income: $310.4 million USD (2010)
- Number of employees: 9,400

Ingersoll Rand Industrial Technologies is a division of Ingersoll Rand. The division manufactures products including air compressors, compressed air treatment and control equipment, turn-key compressed air systems, consumer and commercial tools, pumps and fluid handling systems and material handling and lifting equipment.

Brands in the Industrial Technologies sector include Ingersoll Rand, ARO pumps and Thunder Gun impact tools. Until 2021, the Industrial Technologies division included Club Car, a maker of golf and utility vehicles for businesses and individuals.
