= The Cygnet and the Firebird =

Fantasy novel

- Cover of first edition
- Author: Patricia A. McKillip
- Cover artist: John Howe
- Language: English
- Series: Cygnet series
- Genre: Fantasy
- Publisher: Ace Books
- Publication date: 1993
- Publication place: United States
- Media type: Print (hardcover)
- Pages: 233
- ISBN: 0-441-12628-6
- Preceded by: The Sorceress and the Cygnet

The Cygnet and the Firebird is a fantasy novel by Patricia A. McKillip, a sequel to her earlier novel The Sorceress and the Cygnet. Despite a mixed reception, it was nominated for the 1994 Mythopoeic Fantasy Award for Adult Literature. It was first published in hardcover by Ace Books in September 1993, with a paperback following from the same publisher in September 1995. The first British edition was published in paperback by Pan Books in July 1994. It was subsequently combined with The Sorceress and the Cygnet into the omnibus collection Cygnet, issued in trade paperback by Ace Books in March 2007. It has also been translated into French.

== Summary ==
Two strangers disrupt the settled life of the inhabitants of Ro Holding, the Hold of the Cygnet, and particularly cousins, Meguet Vervaine, warrior-maid, and Nyx, sorceress and daughter of the Holder Lauro Ro.

Meguet stands guard outside a council meeting when the wily, powerful mage Rad Ilex invades the chamber, seeking an ancient object of power hidden in the castle. Meguet and Nyx are able to resist his spell, and Nyx, ignorant of what the mage is looking for, bars Rad from his search.

Afterwards a magical firebird arrives, whose anguished cries and fiery breath transform people and things into jeweled trees. Moonlight restores them to their original forms, and the firebird to his—that of a tormented, partly amnesiac young man named Brand, son and heir of Draken, half-dragon king of the land of Saphier. Unraveling the mystery of Brand's enchantment and breaking the curse on him become prime goals of the protagonists.

The thwarted Rad, returning, fights Brand and is wounded. He flees, abducting Meguet. Nyx follows, having found what Rad seeks, a magical key containing the spells of the long-dead wizard Chrysom.

To save her cousin, free Brand, and learn the cause of Rad and Draken's enmity, Nyx travels to distant Saphier across the eerie, dragon-haunted desert of Luxour, whose slumbering denizens Draken seems intent on awakening.

== Reception ==
Cathy Chauvette in School Library Journal notes that, "[a]s she did in The Riddlemaster of Hed ... and The Forgotten Beasts of Eld ..., McKillip weaves a magic spell of words almost as intoxicating as a drug. The result will depend on readers; some will find its effect addictive, while others will be confused and long for a breath of fresh air. ... The language, though, is either the glory or the curse of the novel. For those who enjoy smoky misdirection and brilliant word pictures, this book will be a feast. All others, be wary."

Sybil S. Steinberg in Publishers Weekly finds the book an "adequate but lackluster follow-up to The Sorceress and the Cygnet, [with an] often tedious plot [that] has too much pursuit and discussion, and not enough direct conflict and dramatic tension. Despite an atmospheric setting, intriguing characters and some interesting magical ideas, this sequel lacks the vitality of its predecessor."

Roland Green in Booklist calls it "[b]eautiful, intricate ... McKillip's writing again has the same cool elegance that makes it a pleasure to read."

Kirkus Reviews rates the novel "[o]ften charming and inventive, but the plot runs out of steam about halfway through. Rather a disappointment after previous high standards."

Carolyn Cushman in Locus finds it "dreamlike" with "imagery ... distinctively dramatic—colorful, evocative, and occasionally surreal.

Other reviews describe it as "an entertaining read" (Australian SF News), and stress its "[l]ush imagery and wry humor ... McKillip's rich language ... conveys real strangeness and power." (Starlog)

The book was also reviewed by Roslyn K. Gross in SF Commentary no. 77, November 2001.

== Awards ==
The novel was nominated for the 1994 Mythopoeic Fantasy Award for Adult Literature, and placed fifteenth in the 1994 Locus Poll Award for Best Fantasy Novel.
