= The Dragonslayer's Apprentice =

1997 novel by David Calder

- First edition
- Author: David Calder
- Illustrator: Stieg Retlin
- Cover artist: Alan Barnett
- Language: English
- Genre: Fantasy novel
- Publisher: Scholastic New Zealand, Ltd., Scholastic Inc.
- Publication date: 1997 (NZ), 1998 (US)
- Publication place: New Zealand
- Media type: paperback
- Pages: 160
- ISBN: 0-590-63093-8

The Dragonslayer's Apprentice is a novel written by David Calder in 1997 and illustrated by Stieg Retlin. It was published in 1997 in New Zealand by Scholastic New Zealand, and in 1998 in the United States by Scholastic.

== Summary ==
A girl called Jackie convinces a man known only as "the Dragonslayer" to allow her to be his apprentice and to work with her along with his taciturn assistant, Ron. At the beginning, the Dragonslayer repeatedly thinks he should not have accepted her as his apprentice, believing himself mad to have taken on not only a woman, but a teenage girl.

After becoming his apprentice Jackie tells him she is the daughter of a noble family who ran away because she was far too bored doing ladylike things all day. He believes most of her story, suspecting that she is actually a royal princess; he also manages to confirm and let Jackie know he knows, without outright asking or saying such. Near the end of the novel, the Dragonslayer and Ron are told by the country's palace's chamberlain that Jackie is indeed a princess. She is allowed to receive her Dragonslayer's cape from her father, the king, and he expresses his pride and that of the kingdom in her for becoming the first female dragonslayer ever.

In this book, dragons do not breathe fire, but do give off a black vapor that people usually think is smoke.

== Characters ==
- Jacqueline "Jackie" - the Dragonslayer's female apprentice. She originally thought the post would be fun, not 'so serious,' but adjusts very well considering, and performs acceptably, becoming a Dragonslayer herself by the end of the book.
- The Dragonslayer - Jackie's master. His father was also a Dragonslayer, so this Dragonslayer has a great deal of experience within the profession.
- Ron - The Dragonslayer's assistant. He is very quiet, but rather smart. He usually nods or shakes his head in response to questions. When he says three or four words in a row, Jackie jokingly says that he has made a speech. His leg is broken when the second dragon is killed, and the Dragonslayer and Jackie leave Ron in a village for a while to heal.
- Bill - A dragonslayer's assistant, who the Dragonslayer hires after Ron is injured. He is married to Widow Matchem and is trying to be a good farmer. Knowledgeable and friendly, if gruff, he works with the Dragonslayer and Jackie for one job - that of killing two giant birds - and then returns home to re-equip his wife's farm.

== Themes ==
A theme of the book is the success and growth of someone through training and trials; ambition, perseverance, and ingenuity play a part. According to Scholastic, topics of the book are "...achievement and success; cleverness, creativity, and imagination; discovery and learning; and life experiences and relationships." Also, the book is about the unusual achievements of a young female character, so an underlying theme is the strength of the perceived 'weaker' sex. Superstition is also presented in a negative but understanding light, and bureaucracy is sometimes presented negatively as well.

== Awards and nominations ==
The Dragonslayer's Apprentice (the Scholastic New Zealand edition) was a finalist for the New Zealand Post Children's Book Awards in 1998, and was, in fact, the Junior Fiction honour book. New Zealand Post sponsors the award.
