= Middlegame =

Fantasy novel by Seanan McGuire

- Author: Seanan McGuire
- Language: English
- Series: Alchemical Journeys
- Genre: Science fiction, fantasy
- Publisher: Tor Books
- Publication date: May 7, 2019
- Publication place: United States
- Pages: 528 (Hardcover)
- Awards: Locus Award for Best Fantasy Novel (2020)
- Followed by: Seasonal Fears

Middlegame is a 2019 science fantasy/horror novel by American novelist Seanan McGuire. It was well-received critically, winning the 2020 Locus Award for Best Fantasy Novel and garnering a nomination for the 2020 Hugo Award for Best Novel.

Middlegame is the first book in the Alchemical Journeys series. It has been followed by Seasonal Fears (2022), Tidal Creatures (2024), and Inkpot Gods (2026). A fifth entry in the series, Asphodel, is planned for release in 2028. The series is also related to The Up-and-Under series, which she wrote under the pen name A. Deborah Baker.

== Plot ==
Alchemist James Reed attempts to create a human embodiment of the Doctrine of Ethos, a fundamental force of the universe. He creates twins Roger and Dodger, child prodigies with mastery over language and mathematics, respectively. The twins forge an intermittent psychic connection as children. The pair reunite in person at Berkeley for grad school. Erin, another construct created by Reed, is Dodger’s roommate. Erin is secretly following Reed’s orders, but resents him for killing her twin brother Darren.

When Roger visits home for Thanksgiving, he finds a childhood drawing of him and Dodger which should not exist. Erin instructs him to reset the timeline. Dodger uses her powers to bring them back in time, erasing all memories of the event. It is revealed that Roger and Dodger have used their powers to reset the timeline thousands of times before, preventing Reed from destroying them. The twins explore their powers, accidentally triggering a massive earthquake which destroys much of Berkeley. Horrified, Roger abandons his sister.

Years later, Roger is a professor who is dating Erin. Reed orders Erin to kill Roger. Erin goes rogue and helps Roger escape. Timelines begin to merge as Roger and Dodger speak to each other from their alternate pasts and futures. Roger and Dodger reunite once again at the Sutro Baths, exploring their reality-warping powers. Dodger is shot and almost dies. Erin and Reed are both killed in a final confrontation. Roger and Dodger decide to learn more about their powers, and agree that they will eventually try once more to find a timeline with a happier ending.

== Background ==
In an interview with the Los Angeles Public Library, McGuire stated that Middlegame was inspired by the song Doctrine of Ethos by Dr. Mary Crowell. In an interview with Den of Geek, McGuire stated she was inspired by the Pythagorean philosophy idea that the universe is entirely made up of math and language. She wanted to explore the idea of "embodying cosmic forces" in order to "make them more relatable".

== Reception ==
=== Reviews ===
Paste called Middlegame "clever and imaginative", with "memorably menacing" antagonists, and compared it to the work of Lev Grossman. NPR considered Reed to be "a little flat", and further described him and his assistant Leigh as "mustache-twisting caricatures driven by non-specific hate and vengeance and not exactly, you know, rounded," but overall praised the book's "complicated structure that demands some fairly close reading", noting that due to "McGuire's skills (...) it never actually feels all that complicated." Publishers Weekly lauded it as "genuinely innovative", "mesmerizing", and the work of "an author of consummate skill", emphasizing that the story's mutable timeline "demand(s) close attention from readers". Kirkus Reviews described it as "thrilling, emotionally resonant, and cerebral", and "Escape to Witch Mountain for grownups", but observed that "it isn't clear" how Reed's plan was intended to work, nor why his followers believe he would share power with them.

=== Awards and honors ===
Kirkus Reviews and Publishers Weekly included Middlegame on their list of the best science fiction and fantasy novels of 2019. Locus Magazine included it on their list of the year's best fantasy novels.

Awards and honors
Year	Award	Category	Result	Ref.
2020	Alex Awards	—	Won	
2020	Endeavour Award	—	Finalist	
2020	Hugo Award	Best Novel	Finalist	
2020	Locus Award	Best Fantasy Novel	Won	

== Related works ==
Middlegame contains several excerpts from Over the Woodward Wall, a fictitious children's novel purportedly written by the equally-fictitious 19th-century alchemist A. Deborah Baker; a complete version of Over the Woodward Wall (written by McGuire) was published in October 2020. This first novel in The Up-and-Under series has been followed by Along the Saltwise Sea, Into the Windwracked Wilds, and Under the Smokestrewn Sky.

Seasonal Fears, a second novel set in the world of Middlegame, was published in 2022. McGuire has stated that she would eventually like to write five novels in the Alchemical Journeys series, with each one related to one of the five alchemical elements. Middlegame, Seasonal Fears, Tidal Creatures, Ink Pot Gods, and an untitled fifth book would represent Fire, Earth, Water, Air, and Aether, respectively.

The third book, Tidal Creatures, was published in 2024 and the fourth book, Inkpot Gods, was published in 2026. The fifth book, Asphodel, is planned for publication.
