= A Song of Wraiths and Ruin =

2020 fantasy novel by Roseanne A. Brown

- First edition
- Author: Roseanne A. Brown
- Language: English
- Genre: Young adult, Fantasy
- Publisher: Balzer + Bray
- Publication date: June 2, 2020
- Publication place: Ghana/United States
- ISBN: 978-0-06-289149-5
- Followed by: A Psalm of Storms and Silence

A Song of Wraiths and Ruin is a 2020 young adult fantasy novel by Ghanaian American writer Roseanne A. Brown. Brown's debut novel inspired by West and North African folktale was published on 2 June 2020 by Balzer + Bray, an imprint of HarperCollins as the first book in a planned duology. It was followed by a sequel; A Psalm of Storms and Silence published in 2021.

== Plot ==
Seventeen year old Karina Alahari is the princess of Ziran, who lost her father and sister in a mysterious fire outbreak. When her mother, the Sultana is assassinated, Karina does not want to carry the burden of rulings and looks for a way to resurrect her mother for which will involve dark magic and a human sacrifice.

Malik and his sisters are poor refugees from the Eshra Mountains who are heading to Ziran to find a job. When his younger sister is taken away from them by an evil spirit, Malik makes a deal to kill the princess, in order to save his sister.

The evil spirit says that he has to kill the princess by Solstasia's end or they will kill Malik's sister. So Malik becomes a champion to get closer to the princess. Solstasia is a festival celebrating a comet that passes once in every 50 years.

Karina and Malik meets during the Solstasia and they fall in love with each other but each of them struggles with their individual intentions. Karina plans on using Malik and a couple of other people for the human sacrifice while Malik plans to kill her to save his sister.

Karina finds out that there is a traitor in the castle, and tries to figure out who it is.

== Reception ==
The book became a New York Times best seller and a Kirkus Review best book of 2020. It received generally positive receptions from readers and reviewers. In a starred review by Kirkus Review states that the storyline is "revitalizing and exciting, Brown’s debut breathes life into ancient but still relevant folk stories". Another review from Publishers Weekly called the novel "An action-packed tale of injustice, magic, and romance. Lauren Sheehan-Clark in a review for The Daily Californian noted that it incorporates many fantasy tropes "while also breathing new life into a repetitive genre".
