= The Library at Mount Char =

2015 novel by Scott Hawkins

- Author: Scott Hawkins
- Language: English
- Genre: Fantasy, horror
- Publisher: Crown Books
- Publication date: 2015
- Publication place: United States
- Media type: Hardcover
- Pages: 390
- ISBN: 9780553418606

The Library at Mount Char is a contemporary fantasy/horror novel written by Scott Hawkins. It is his first novel.

== Plot summary ==
Carolyn had lived with eleven "siblings" under the care of a millennia-old and godlike man known to them as Father (also known as Ablakha or Adam Black), prone to acts of sadistic cruelty. All have strange powers, learned from books held in Father's library. Carolyn employs Steve Hodgson, a goodhearted former minor league housebreaker to break into a house for her. Unknown to him, she wanted to conceal evidence of a murder committed by her. Hodgson dies, betrayed by Carolyn.

A metaphysical security device from Earth's future prevents them from entering the library. We learn more about the "siblings." David has inhuman martial skills. Jennifer has healing skills and can resurrect the dead. Michael speaks with animals and Carolyn herself knows many languages, many of them supernatural. Father has vanished, perhaps killed by one of his enemies.

Erwin Leffington, a former war hero employed by the US government, has come to prison to interview Steve Hodgson (now alive once more). Steve had gone to jail for the murder Carolyn committed. David frees Steve, with many casualties. Carolyn phones the US President in order to drop all charges against Steve and sends the man himself to retrieve the mystical barrier. He'll have assistance of the lions Dresden and his female cub Naga, now allies of the family.

After many misadventures, and the death of Dresden, Steve retrieves the artifacts. The US government, on the President's orders, attack the family and kill most of them. The sun goes out. Other apocalyptic events occur. Carolyn, who had killed Father, fights David. Thanks in part to the intervention of Erwin (which Carolyn had planned), she bests him.

Carolyn and Steve, it transpires, had known each other as children. Father had also planned for Carolyn to depose him. David, in between life and death, and in agony, serves as Earth's new, dark sun, but Steve voluntarily replaces him. Carolyn, with the assistance of Michael and Erwin, will protect the Earth from Father's inhuman foes.

== Reception ==
Reviews of the novel were generally positive by major media sources and critics. The Wall Street Journal described it as "wholly original…the work of the newest major talent in fantasy". The Boston Globe called it "an engrossing fantasy world full of supernatural beings and gruesome consequences". The Dallas Morning News praised Hawkins' writing, particularly the dialogue, but criticized the book's ending, concluding that the book was "a thrill ride that ends with a chore". In a retrospective review of "strange books" on NPR, Victoria Schwab called the book an "ambitious and perplexing debut" that "sits somewhere on the border of thriller and speculative fiction, morbid and action-packed and existential and utterly resistant to categorization".

In 2024, Hawkins was still hesitant to work on a sequel. The rights to the novel for adaptations were yet to be sold.
