= Jan Siegel =

British author

Jan Siegel is a pseudonym of Amanda Hemingway (born 1955 in London, UK). She is a British author of fantasy novels, best known for the Fern Capel series.

The daughter of architect George Askew and Mavis Gold, Amanda grew up in Lewes (East Sussex, UK) where her father was for a time mayor. She became Amanda Hemingway on marriage to Martin Hemingway in 1977 (marriage dissolved 1981).

== Bibliography ==
=== Novels ===
==== Fernanda "Fern" Capel ====
1. Prospero's Children (1999)
2. The Dragon-Charmer (2000)
3. The Witch's Honour, published in US as The Witch Queen (2002)

=== Sangreal Trilogy ===
==== The Greenstone Grail ====
Modern-day Nathan, 11, stumbles upon the ruins of a dark chapel in the deep woods, and becomes haunted by dreams of a grail cup filled with blood. His mother, Annie, runs a second-hand bookshop in the small, quiet town of Thornyhill, and they are unknowingly protected by the benevolent Bartlemy Goodman, an excellent cook and dabbling wizard. Nathan's dreams become more vivid and bizarre as he begins dreaming of another world, Eos, in another parallel dimension, which has poisoned itself and is dying, despite their technological advancement and near-immortality. Soon Nathan realizes that he is actually being transported to real places, and is able to interact and change things in this world. It all seems to be tied to the grail of his dreams, the Greenstone Grail, which was protected by a Thornyhill family for centuries until it was lost to them. This book was published in 2005 by Del Rey Books.

==== The Traitor's Sword ====
This book was also published under the name The Sword of Straw. Nathan, now 13, has gained a bit more control over his dreaming skill, and now his dreams are showing him yet another world in a medieval-type vein, where a princess named Nell and her ailing father watch over an enchanted sword in a tiny kingdom. The sword had inflicted a wound on the king that will not heal, and Nathan hopes that this sword is indeed the sword of stroar, the second item needed to save the dying world Eos. As Nathan struggles to understand, dark forces in his own world work to trap him and destroy him, since he is the only one able to move so freely between universes in his dreams. This book was published in 2006 by Voyager Books in the UK as The Traitor's Sword, and by Del Rey Books in the United States in 2006 as The Sword of Straw.

==== The Poisoned Crown ====
Nathan must find the last item needed to save the dying Eos, the crown, which is in a parallel universe on a planet that is completely water. There, merfolk prepare a battle with the selkies, which Nathan diffuses. However, the leader of the dying universe, the Grandir, is crossing over into Nathan's world, and Nathan must help save Eos while keeping his own world and escaping all of the evil around him that wants him destroyed. This book was published in 2007 by Voyager Books in the UK, and by Del Rey Books in the United States.

==== Other works ====
- Pzyche (1982)
- Tantalus (1984)
- Bacchanal (1987)
- The Viper's Heart, also published as The Poison Heart (1990)
- Soulfire (1994)
