= The Princes of the Golden Cage =

Book by Nathalie Mallet

- Cover of first edition
- Author: Nathalie Mallet
- Cover artist: Paul Youll
- Language: English
- Genre: Fantasy
- Publisher: Night Shade Books
- Publication date: August 2007
- Publication place: United States
- Media type: Print (Paperback)
- Pages: 320pp
- ISBN: 978-1-59780-090-7
- OCLC: 148800868
- Followed by: The King's Daughters

The Princes of the Golden Cage is Nathalie Mallet's debut novel, the first installment in The Prince Amir Mystery series. It is a fantasy/mystery; however this novel has also been classified as historical fantasy. The second book in the series, The King's Daughters, was released in 2008.

== Plot summary ==
Prince Amir lives in a lavish and beautiful cage. He lives in a palace with hundreds of his brothers, all barred by law from ever leaving the palace until he, or one of his brothers, becomes the next Sultan. Living under constant threat of death at the hands of his scheming brothers, Amir has chosen a life of solitude and study. His scholarly and alchemical pursuits bring him under suspicion when his brothers begin to die from seemingly supernatural means. Amir finds himself thrown together with his brother Erik, the son of a barbarian princess. Together they must discover the dark secret that is stalking the halls of their golden cage.
