= Nathalie Mallet =

Nathalie Mallet is a Canadian mystery, science fiction and fantasy writer.

== Early life ==
Mallet grew up in Shippagan, New Brunswick, and resides in Prince George, British Columbia.

== Career ==
Mallet's debut novel, The Princes of the Golden Cage published by Night Shade Books in 2007, is the first installment in the Prince Amir Mystery series. The second book in the series, The King's Daughters, is scheduled for 2008.

== Bibliography ==
=== The Prince Amir Mystery Series ===
1. The Princes of the Golden Cage (2007)(ISBN 9781597800907)
2. The King's Daughters (summer 2009) (ISBN 9781597801355)
3. Death in the Traveling City (summer 2011) (ISBN 9781463634568)

=== Others ===
1. The Digging Crew (LTDBooks, 2005) (ISBN 1-55316-143-2)
