= Black Blossom =

1993 novel by Boban Knežević

- Cover of the U.S. edition of Black Blossom, Prime Books, 2004
- Author: Boban Knežević
- Original title: Црни цвет; Crni cvet
- Translator: Dragana Rajkov
- Language: Serbian
- Genre: Novel
- Publisher: Prime Books (English translation)
- Publication date: 1993
- Publication place: Yugoslavia
- English publication date: 2004
- Media type: Print (hardback & paperback)
- Pages: 140
- ISBN: 978-1894815895

Black Blossom (Serbian: Црни цвет, romanized: Crni cvet) is an epic high fantasy novel by Serbian writer Boban Knežević, published in 1993. Originally written in Serbian, the novel has been translated into English by Dragana Rajkov and published in the United States independent publishing house Prime Books in 2004.

== Reception ==
Kirsten J. Bishop: "Black Blossom is a genuinely magical story with the timeless qualities of legends and fairytales. Written with sophistication and elegance, it poses necessary questions about the traditional hero, the man of strength and valour."

Zoran Stefanović: "European epic songs, Balkan ethnic narratives, fairy tales, geopolitical and conspiracy myths, modern sword and sorcery genre, stream of consciousness novel... In my mind, Black Blossom is the only book I know that accurately and seamlessly integrates traditional and modern genres of completely different storytelling techniques. The result is sharp and touching, a Jungian drama with long-term echoes."

Publishers Weekly: "First published in Yugoslavia in 1993, Knežević's novel takes the form of a postmodern sword-and-sorcery adventure to comment insightfully on the nature of heroism and aggression. Its nameless narrator, a persecuted young Serb, bargains with a captive wizard to obtain the strength he needs to defend himself. (...) The allegorical intent of the story becomes clear only gradually, insofar as Knežević deliberately jumbles the order of his narrative, alternating early and later chapters in such a way that events of past and present are constantly mirroring and blending indistinguishably with one another. The resulting portrait of a world where crimes of the past repeat themselves and violence begets even more violence makes for a timeless parable that readers will find speaks to the contemporary political reality of the author's country, as well as to the rest of the world."

Cheryl Morgan: "The story is essentially a meditation on the role of the muscle-bound hero in folk tales and fantasy fiction, and as such is a good deal more intelligent than the average fabricated, extruded fantasy product of which publishers are so fond these days. It is also blessedly short."

== Awards ==
- Winner of the "Lazar Komarcic" Award for the best Yugoslav science fiction & fantasy novel, 1993
