= Faith Hunter =

American novelist

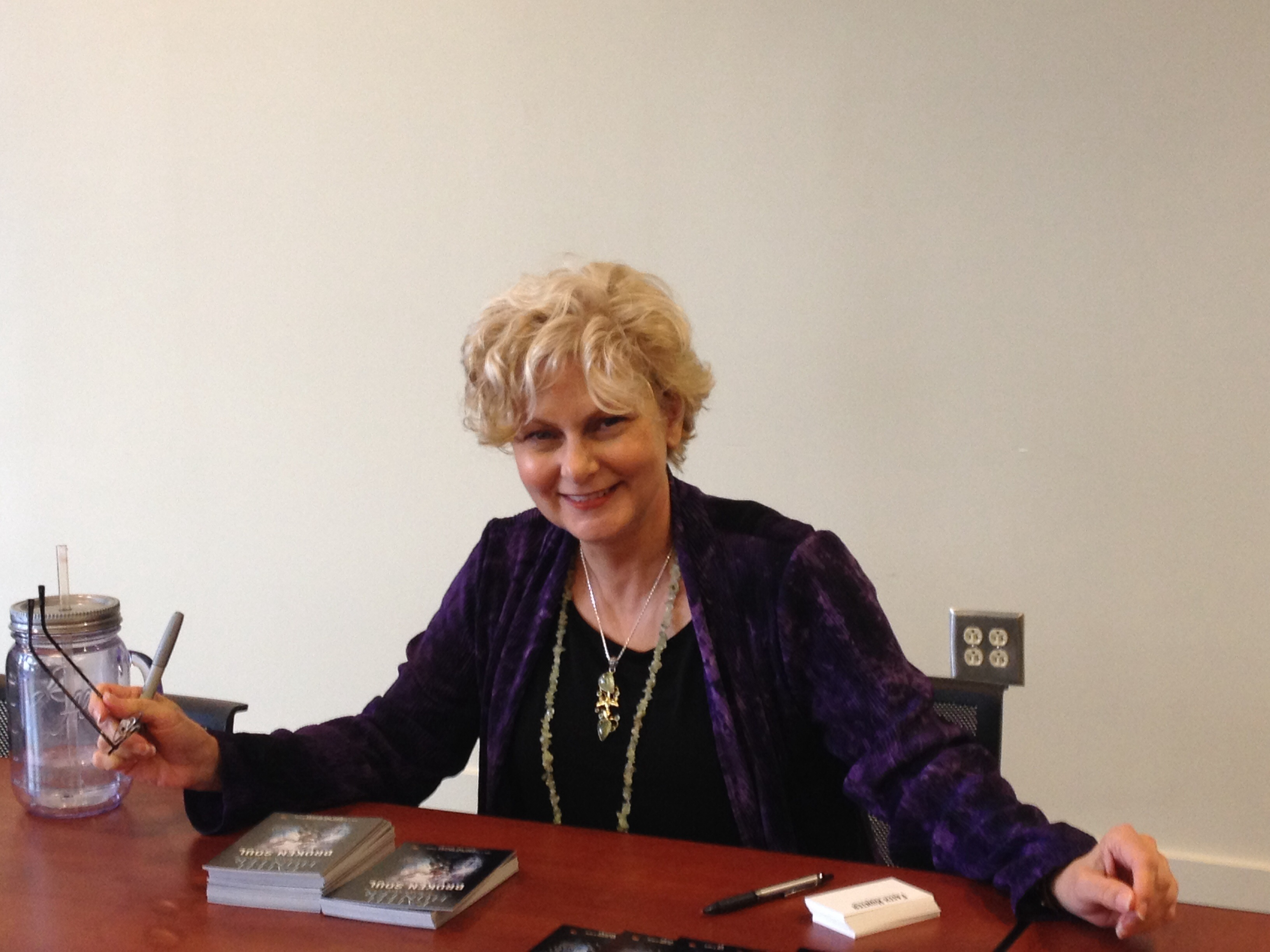
- Faith Hunter speaking at Athens-Clarke County Library in 2014
- Occupation: Novelist
- Writing career
- Pen name: Faith Hunter, Gwen Hunter, Gary Hunter
- Period: 1990 to present
- Genres: thriller; post-apocalyptic fantasy, urban fantasy
- Website: www.faithhunter.net

Gwendolyn Faith Hunter is an American author and blogger, writing in the fantasy and thriller genres. She writes as Faith Hunter in the fantasy genre, and as Gwen Hunter in the thriller genre. She also has collaborated on thrillers with Gary Leveille, jointly using the name Gary Hunter. Hunter is one of the founding members of MagicalWords.net, a writer assistance blog, and has developed a role-playing game based on her Rogue Mage series.

== Biography ==
Hunter grew up in the Louisiana bayou country and began writing during high school. She graduated from college with a degree in Allied Health Technology and used to work full-time in a rural hospital. She resides in South Carolina with her husband, Rod Hunter.

== Reception ==
Critical reception for Hunter's work has been positive, with Monsters and Critics praising Bloodring as "an entertaining, if a bit rough first volume in a promising new series". Publishers Weekly and Kirkus Reviews also reviewed Bloodring, with Publishers Weekly praising the "strong, cliffhanger ending".

== Bibliography ==
=== as Gary Hunter ===
==== Garrick Travis series ====
- —— (1990). Death Warrant. Warner Books. ISBN 9780446360135.
- —— (1992). Death Sentence. Warner Books. ISBN 9780446360142.

=== as Gwen Hunter ===
==== Rhea Lynch, M.D. series ====
- —— (1997). Ashes to Ashes. Trafalgar Square Publishing. ISBN 0340638001.
- —— (2001). Delayed Diagnosis. Mira Books. ISBN 1551668033.
- —— (2002). Prescribed Danger. Mira Books. ISBN 1551669161.
- —— (2003). Deadly Remedy. Mira Books. ISBN 1551666693.
- —— (2004). Grave Concerns. Mira Books. ISBN 0778320065.
- —— (2008). Sleep Softly. Mira Books. ISBN 9780778324645.

==== DeLande Saga series ====
- —— (1994). Betrayal. Pocket Star Books. ISBN 0671891537.
- —— (1995). False Truths. Pocket Star Books. ISBN 0671891545.
- —— (1997). Law of the Wild. Trafalgar Square Publishing. ISBN 0340638028.

==== Stand-alone books ====
- —— (2004). Shadow Valley. Mira Books. ISBN 9780778321309.
- —— (2005). Bloodstone. Mira Books. ISBN 9780778322214.
- —— (2007). Blackwater Secrets. Bella Rosa Books. ISBN 9781933523026.
- —— (2009). Rapid Descent. Mira Books. ISBN 9780778326212.
- —— (2012). His Blood Like Tears. Bella Rosa Books. ISBN 9781933523422.

==== Nonfiction ====
- "Whitewater Evolution: A Novelist's Route from Phobia to Obsession", American Whitewater, March/April 2009, page 60-61

=== as Faith Hunter ===
==== Rogue Mage series ====
1. Bloodring. Roc. 2006. ISBN 978-0451461087.
2. Seraphs. Roc. 2007. ISBN 978-0451461476.
3. Host. Roc. 2007. ISBN 978-0451461735.
4. Hunter, Faith; et al. (et al) (2016). Hunter, Faith; Jones, Spike (eds.). Rogue Mage Anthology Book 1: Trials. Lore Seekers Press. ASIN B01N43OZ6C.
5. Hunter, Faith; et al. (et al) (2016). Hunter, Faith; Jones, Spike (eds.). Rogue Mage Anthology Book 2: Tribulations. Lore Seekers Press. ASIN B01N2UTGCF.

==== Jane Yellowrock series ====
These are in chronological order to match the timeline of the books.

#	Title	Anthology or Collection	Comments	With	Publication Date	Publisher	ISBN
0.0	Water Witch Crossover			D.B. Jackson (Hannah Everhart)	Jun 2015	Bella Rosa Books	ASIN B00Z815OP2
0.1	Explosion on King’s Street Crossover		Novella	David B Coe (Hannah Everhart)	2015 2018	Lore Seeker’s Press	
0.2	"Eighteen Sixty"	The Weird Wild West	Aya		2015	eSpec Books	ISBN 978-1-942990-01-7
0.3	"Wolves Howling in the Night"	Lawless Lands	Aya				
0.4	"WeSa and the Lumber King"	Blood in Her Veins			2016	ROC	ISBN 978-0-698-19698-8
0.5	"Make it Snappy"	Urban Enemies	Leo		Aug 2017	Gallery Books	ISBN 978-1-501155-08-6
0.6	"The Early Years"	Blood in Her Veins	Beast		2016	ROC	ISBN 978-0-698-19698-8
0.7	"Snafu"	Blood in Her Veins	Jane		2016	ROC	ISBN 978-0-698-19698-8
0.8	"Cat Tats"	Blood in Her Veins	Rick		2016	ROC	ISBN 978-0-698-19698-8
0.9	"Kits'"	Blood in Her Veins	Jane		2016	ROC	ISBN 978-0-698-19698-8
0.10	"Haints'"	Blood in Her Veins	Molly		2016	ROC	ISBN 978-0-698-19698-8
0.11	"Signatures of the Dead"	Blood in Her Veins Strange Brew			2016	ROC	ISBN 978-0-698-19698-8
1	Skinwalker				Jul 7, 2009	ROC	ISBN 978-0-451-46280-0
1.5	"First Sight"	Blood in Her Veins	Bruiser		2016	ROC	ISBN 978-0-698-19698-8
2	Blood Cross				Jan 5, 2010	ROC	ISBN 978-0-451-46307-4
3	Mercy Blade				Jan 4, 2011	ROC	ISBN 978-0-451-46372-2
3.5	"Blood, Fangs and Going Furry"	Blood in Her Veins	Rick		2016	ROC	ISBN 978-0-698-19698-8
3.75	"Dance Master"	Blood in Her Veins	Bruiser		2016	ROC	ISBN 978-0-698-19698-8
4	Raven Cursed				Jan 3, 2012	ROC	ISBN 978-0-451-46433-0
4.25	"Cajun With Fangs"	Blood in Her Veins	Jane		2016	ROC	ISBN 978-0-698-19698-8
4.5	"Golden Delicious"	An Apple for a Creature Blood in Her Veins	Rick		2016	ROC	ISBN 978-0-698-19698-8
4.75	"Easy Pickings"		Crossover Novella Jane		Nov 2012	Bella Rosa Books	ASIN B00AFNW7BC
5	Death's Rival				Oct 2, 2012	ROC	ISBN 978-0-451-46485-9
5.5	"George Meets Beast"		Mud Mymudes		2015		
6	Blood Trade				Apr 2, 2013	ROC	ISBN 9780451465061
6.25	"The Devil’s Left Boot"	Kicking It Blood in Her Veins	Everhart Twins		2013 2016	ROC	ISBN 978-0-451-41900-2
6.5	"Beneath a Bloody Moon"	Blood in Her Veins	Jane		2016	ROC	ISBN 978-0-698-19698-8
6.75	"Black Water"	Blood in Her Veins	Jane		2016	ROC	ISBN 978-0-698-19698-8
7	Black Arts				Jan 7, 2014	ROC	ISBN 978-0451465245
7.25	"Off the Grid"	Blood in Her Veins	Soulwood intro novella		2016	ROC	ISBN 978-0-698-19698-8
7.5	"Shiloh and the Brick"	published online on multiple websites, Part one, Part two, Part three, Part four, Part five, Part six	Jane				
8	Broken Soul				Oct 7, 2014	ROC	ISBN 9780451465955
8.5	"Not All is as it Seems"	Blood in Her Veins	Molly		2016	ROC	ISBN 978-0-698-19698-8
9	Dark Heir				Apr 7, 2015	ROC	ISBN 9780451465962
9.1	"Blood of the Earth"		Soulwood Series		Aug 2016	ROC	ISBN 978-0451473301
9.2	"How Occam Got His Name"	published online at Bea's Book Nook	Occam				
9.3	"Cat Fight"	Blood in Her Veins	Jane		2016	ROC	ISBN 978-0-698-19698-8
9.4	"Bound No More"	Blood in Her Veins	Jane		2016	ROC	ISBN 978-0-698-19698-8
9.5	"Candy from a Vampire"	was available on website now only in Of Claws and Fangs: Stories from the World of Jane Yellowrock and Soulwood	Leo		2022		ISBN 978-0-593-33434-8
9.6	"It’s Just a Date"	published online at Faith's website	Jane				
10	Shadow Rites				Apr 5, 2016	ROC	ISBN 9780451465979
10.1	"Curse on the Land"		Soulwood Series		Nov 2016	ROC	ISBN 978-0451473325
10.25	"Anzu, Duba, Beast"	Were	Jane		2016	Zombies Need Brains	ISBN 1940709105.
10.5	"She Bitch"	The Monster Hunter Files	Jane		2016	Baen Books	ISBN 978-1-4814-8275-2
11	Cold Reign				May 2, 2017	Ace	ISBN 978-1101991404
11.1	"Flame in the Dark"		Soulwood Series		Dec 2017	ROC	ISBN 978-0451473332
11.25	"Black Friday Shopping"	published online at Faith's website	Nell Occam		May 2017		
11.5	"Death and the Fashionista"	The Death of All Things	Molly		Aug 2017	Zombies Need Brains	ISBN 978-1940709161
11.75	"My Dark Knight"	Temporally Deactivated	Everhart-Truebloods Edmond		Jun 2019	Zombies Need Brains	ISBN 978-1940709246
12	Dark Queen				May 1, 2018	Ace	ISBN 978-1101991428
13	Shattered Bonds				Oct 29, 2019	Ace	ISBN 978-0399587986
13.25	"Circle of the Moon"		Soulwood Series		Feb 2019	ROC	ISBN 978-0399587948
13.50	"Bound into Darkness"	Dirty Deeds	Liz, Eli		January 12, 2021	Pen & Page Publishing	ISBN 1649640102
13.51	"The Ties That Bind"	Dirty Deeds	Bedelia, Lincoln		January 12, 2021	Pen & Page Publishing	ISBN 1649640102
13.52	"Liz and Eli Sitting"	Dirty Deeds 2	Liz, Eli		January 7, 2022	Pen & Page Publishing	ISBN 1649640757
14	True Dead				September 2021	Ace	ISBN 9780451488749
15	Final Heir				September 2022	Ace	ISBN 9780593335826

==== Soulwood series ====
1. Blood of the Earth. Roc. 2016. ISBN 978-0451473301.
2. Curse on the Land. Roc. 2016. ISBN 978-0451473325.
3. Flame in the Dark. Roc. 2017. ISBN 978-0451473332.
4. Circle of the Moon. Roc. 2019. ISBN 978-0399587948.
5. Spells for the Dead. Ace. 2020. ISBN 978-0399587962.

=== Unrelated ===
1. Magic School for Geezers, June 7, 2022, Dirty Deeds 2, ISBN 1649640757

==== Nonfiction ====
- "Common Misconceptions About Writers", Crossed Genres, Issue 1.

== See also ==
- Urban Fantasy
- List of fantasy authors
- List of fantasy novels
- List of thriller writers
