= Steerswoman books =

Speculative fiction series by Rosemary Kirstein

The Steerswoman books are a series of four speculative fiction novels by Rosemary Kirstein. The series is set in a world that resembles a conventional sword-and-sorcery fantasy setting, but gradually reveals itself to be a science fiction world shaped by lost technology.

== Publication history ==
The series consists of four books: The Steerswoman (1989), The Outskirter's Secret (1992), The Lost Steersman (2003), and The Language of Power (2004). The full series is planned to be seven books. The first two books were also published in the omnibus The Steerswoman's Road in 2003. The books were originally published by Del Rey Books, but Kirstein has re-acquired the copyright to self-publish them.

== Setting ==
A Steerswoman is a traveling scholar, required to answer any question asked of them, as long as the asker answers truthfully in return. Anyone refusing to answer a Steerswoman's question is placed under a ban, and no Steerswoman will answer their questions in future. Only wizards do not respect the Steerswomen, maintaining intense secrecy around their magic.

Kirstein's work is often characterized as science fantasy. Jo Walton describes the Steerswoman series as "not only science fiction, but more science fictional than anything else." Cory Doctorow says of The Steerswoman, "even the book's genre is a riddle that you'll have enormous great fun solving." The Steerswoman series addresses themes of technological development, inter-species interaction, and distribution of knowledge.

== Plot summaries ==
=== The Steerswoman ===
Steerswoman Rowan is investigating strange jewels that have been found scattered across the land. She begins traveling with Bel, a warrior from the Outskirts with a belt of these jewels. They are attacked twice by wizards' soldiers, and the Steerswomen conclude that the wizards are trying to prevent Rowan's investigation. Rowan renounces her status as Steerswoman so she can lie and travel undercover. Meanwhile, teenaged Will has run away from his small town. He has a talent for making things explode, much in the way wizards do sometimes. He joins Rowan and Bel, in the belief they will help him become a wizard's apprentice.

Rowan and Bel infiltrate the fortress of two wizards, where Rowan is captured. Rowan shares information freely with the wizards, without asking any questions which they might refuse to answer. She gleans that they are following orders from a secret higher wizard, Slado. Bel and Will free her, using Will's exploding magic to destroy the wizards' fortress.

Rowan meets with another wizard, and informs him that it is useless for Slado to try to prevent her investigation, as the progress of information cannot be stopped. She explains that the gems are pieces of a crashed Guidestar, which Rowan now knows to be an orbital satellite used by wizards for their magic. A demonstration of Will's magic convinces this wizard to accept Will as an apprentice. Will departs with the promise that he will share the wizards' secrets with the Steerswomen if he discovers that their secrecy is not motivated by good reasons.

=== The Outskirter's Secret ===
After surviving the attempts on her life in the first book, Rowan continues her investigation of the mystery of the blue gems. Now knowing they are fragments of a fallen Guidestar, she embarks on a journey to the location where it is believed to have fallen. This journey takes her through the Outskirts, a region with different biology, human culture, and environmental conditions from the Inner Lands, where Rowan is from. Rowan and Bel cross the Inner Lands into the Outskirts, and meet multiple tribes of Outskirters, eventually agreeing to travel north with a group. Through their travels, encounters with other tribes, and wizard's minions, the stakes are increasingly raised. After the wizards send a devastating attack that nearly kills the entire tribe, and wipes out multiple others, both Rowan and the Outskirters are forced to reckon with new concepts and future disaster, and begin preparations to join forces.

=== The Lost Steersman ===
Seeking information that would lead her to Slado, Rowan travels to the seaside town of Alemeth in search of answers in the Annex, a backup repository of all the Steerswomen's knowledge. Finding it poorly maintained and in disarray, Rowan becomes involved in village life as she seeks to organise the library, and in the process meets an old friend, Janus, a former steersman who had left the guild without explanation. Her quest to find Slado is thrown into turmoil by the arrival of dangerous creatures from the Outskirts.

=== The Language of Power ===
Following their encounters in the Outskirts and discovery of the fallen Guidestar's nature, Steerswoman Rowan and her companion, the Outskirter warrior Bel, travel to the city of Donner. Their goal is to investigate the history of Slado, the powerful and secretive wizard responsible for the Guidestar's destruction and the escalating attacks on the Outskirts. Their search centers on understanding Slado's past and his connection to a previous wizard of Donner, Kieran, who underwent a dramatic and unexplained change in personality late in his life.

In Donner, Rowan and Bel are reunited with Willam, the former wizard's apprentice from the first book. As Rowan delves into the city's history, piecing together decades-old clues from historical records and the memories of elderly residents, she uncovers a complex tale of past events that sheds light on the wizards' secrets. The investigation reveals that Kieran discovered something profound that altered his perspective and that Slado, his apprentice at the time, was deeply involved.

The trio learns that crucial information might be hidden within the current wizard's house, formerly Kieran's residence. To retrieve this knowledge, they devise a plan to break into the heavily protected dwelling. This involves luring the formidable wizard away and navigating the magical and technological defenses of his home. Their infiltration brings them closer to understanding the true nature of the wizards' power, its connection to the Guidestar technology, and the motivations behind Slado's destructive actions.

== Reception ==
Jo Walton has called the Steerswoman "terrific fun to read", with "really good prose", while James Nicoll stated that it was "what SF should aspire to be". Pornokitsch has described The Steerswoman as "a lovely example of an epic story driven by brains over brawn, and wit over magical destiny", noting that "unlike many of its contemporaries, [it] has not aged badly".

Jo Walton said of the series "It's a very difficult trick to have revelations within a story that mean different things to the reader and the characters, but Kirstein dances over this constant abyss with delicate grace." Richard Marcus reviewed the series for Blog Critics and said "Ms. Kirstein has created marvellous characters that make the themes she is addressing all the more real."

In 2012, The Steerswoman was included in Damien Broderick and Paul Di Filippo's book Science Fiction: The 101 Best Novels 1985-2010, a continuation of the 1985 Science Fiction: The 100 Best Novels.
