= A Riddle of Roses =

2000 novel by Caryl Cude Mullin

- 2000 release
- Author: Caryl Cude Mullin
- Illustrator: Kasia Charko
- Language: English
- Genre: Young adult, Fantasy
- Publisher: Second Story Press
- Publication date: October 2000
- Publication place: United States
- Media type: Print (Paperback)
- Pages: 222 pp
- ISBN: 1-896764-28-2
- OCLC: 43390355

A Riddle of Roses is the debut novel of Caryl Cude Mullin. It was illustrated by Kasia Charko and released by Second Story Press in 2000. The novel is well suited for young readers and marketed for young teenagers. The novel's topic is influenced by Celtic mythology and Arthurian legends.

== Plot introduction ==
The story is about an orphan girl named Meryl and her dream of becoming a bard like her mother before her, and the quest she must go on to achieve this goal. She and a Draoi (dro-aw-eye) named Halstatt come together to journey to a great kingdom and drink from a magic cauldron to discover her true destiny.

== Awards ==
The book was nominated for the 2002 Hackmatack award in Canada.

== Reception ==
When reviewing the book for SF Site, Scientist George T Dodds called the novel as a "delightful story for young readers" that "reads remarkably well for its target audience, with a nice mix of fantasy, interesting and unusual characters, and an avoidance of didacticism and moral preaching." Jeffrey Canton, reviewing the novel for Quill & Quire, compared the novel to Welwyn Wilton Katz's A Third Magic, concluding that the "novel mirrors the great tradition of songs and stories that her young heroine longs to place herself in but, more importantly, it leaves readers with a story that does the bardic tradition proud."

== See also ==
- 2010 Quebec Writers' Federation Awards, author Caryl Cude Mullin, for Rough Magic
