= Boban Knežević =

Serbian science fiction and fantasy writer, comic book writer, editor and publisher

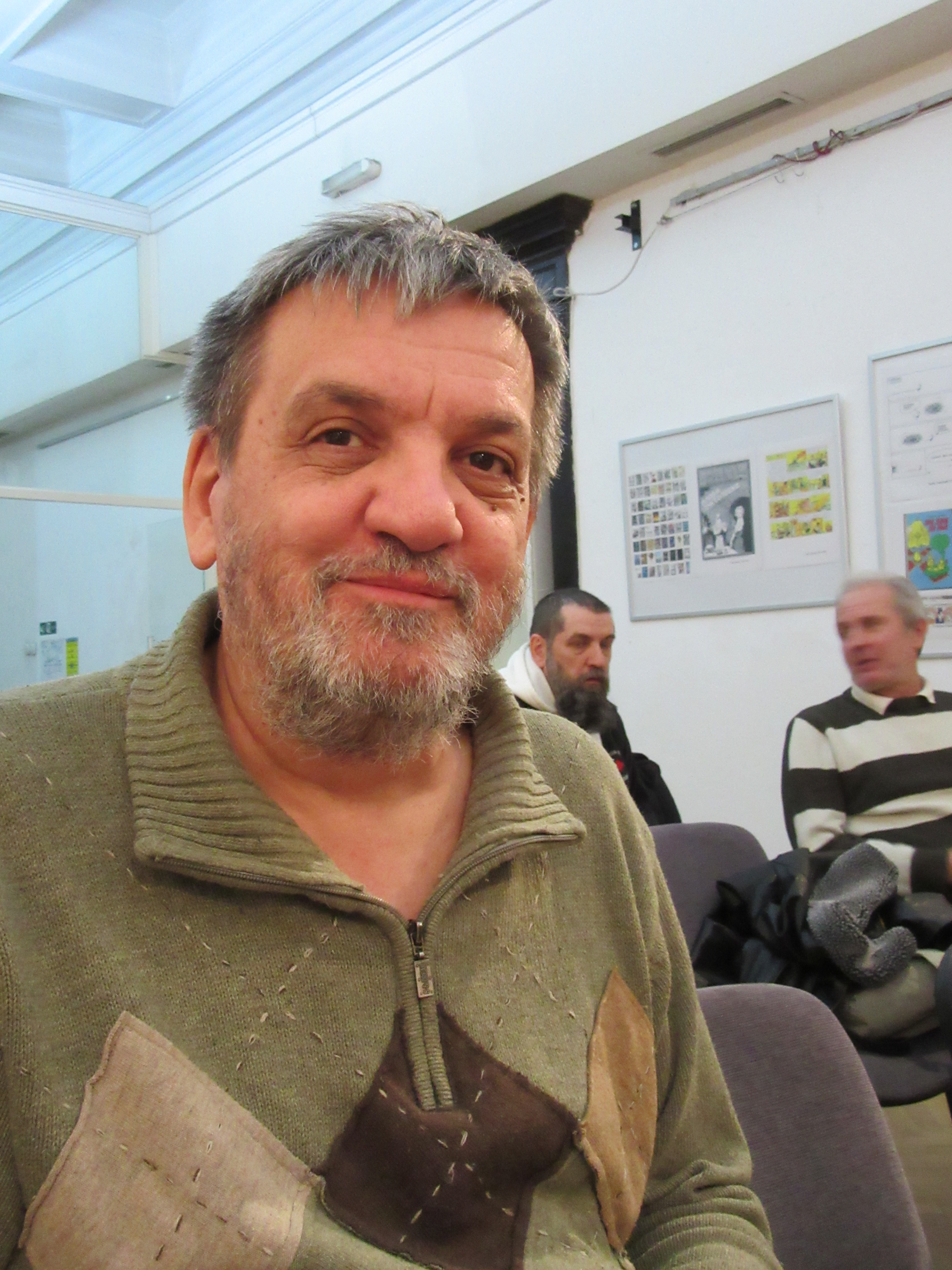
- Born: Boban Knežević; 17 September 1959 (age 66); Belgrade, Yugoslavia
- Occupations: Writer, publisher, editor
- Spouse: Sandra
- Writing career
- Language: Serbian
- Period: 1979–present
- Genres: Science fiction, fantasy
- Notable work: Black Blossom
- Notable awards: "Lazar Komarčić" award (six times)
- Website: boban.rs

Boban Knežević (Serbian Cyrillic: Бобан Кнежевић, born 17 September 1959 in Belgrade) is a Serbian science fiction and fantasy writer, comic book writer, editor and publisher.

He has been publishing fiction since 1978 in a variety of genres: his works range over alternate history, space opera, Slavic mythology based fantasy, and cyberpunk.

Knežević was one of the founders of the Belgrade-based semi-professional Society of science fiction fans, "Lazar Komarčić" in 1981, and is considered as "one of the pivotal persons of Belgrade fandom".

Since 1985, he also owns the formerly Yugoslavian publishing imprint, "Znak Sagite".

== Bibliography ==
=== Books ===
- Smrt na Neptunu [Смрт на Нептуну / Death on Neptune], novel, "Dnevnik", Novi Sad, 1986 (under the pseudonym Endru Ozborn / Andrew Osborne)
- Crni cvet [Црни цвет / Black Blossom], novel, "Prosveta", Belgrade (six Serbian editions from 1993 to 2011). ISBN 978-86-7552-049-8
  - English translation: Black Blossom, "Prime Books", 2004. and 2005. ISBN 978-1894815901
- Čovek koji je ubio leptira [Човек који је убио лептира / A man who killed a butterfly], novel, Studentski kulturni centar, Belgrade, 1996.
- Slutnja androida [Слутња андроида / Android's premonition], a collection of stories, 2001. ISBN 86-83577-04-X
- Poslednji Srbin [Последњи Србин / Last Serb], novel, "Alnari", Belgrade, 2009. ISBN 978-86-7710-414-6
- Otisak zveri u pepelu [Отисак звери у пепелу / Footprints of the beast in the ashes], a collection of short stories, "Tardis", Belgrade, 2009. ISBN 978-86-6099-009-1

=== Noted anthologies and collections ===
- Tamni vilajet 1, Belgrade, "Znak Sagite", Belgrade, 1987.
- Tamni vilajet 1a, Belgrade, "Znak Sagite", Belgrade, 1987.
- Tamni vilajet 2, "Znak Sagite", Belgrade, 1992.
- Tamni vilajet 3, "Znak Sagite", Belgrade, 1993.
- Tamni vilajet 4, "Znak Sagite", Belgrade, 1996. and 2011. ISBN 978-86-7756-008-9
- Nova srpska fantastika, SIC, Belgrade, 1994. ISBN 86-7339-018-4
- "Fantastična reč", Književna reč, br. 492/493, Belgrade, 1997.
- Trifid, authors: Dragan R. Filipović, Goran Skrobonja and Boban Knežević; Knjižara "Alan Ford", Belgrade, 2001. ISBN 86-83577-01-5

== Awards ==
- "Lazar Komarčić" award for best Yugoslav short story in 1985. ("Noć koja neće doći")
- "Lazar Komarčić" award for best Yugoslav short story in 1986. ("Dan četrnaesti")
- "Lazar Komarčić" award for best Yugoslav short story in 1993. ("Onaj koji nema dušu")
- "Lazar Komarčić" award for best Yugoslav novel in 1993. (Crni cvet / Black Blossom)
- "Lazar Komarčić" award for best Yugoslav short story in 1994. ("Prosjak i kockar")
- "Lazar Komarčić" award for best Yugoslav short story in 1995.

== Literature ==
- Pavle Zelić et al. "Boban Knežević, monolit srpske fantastike", Gradina, Niš, broj 19/2007.
- Stefanović, Zoran. "Slobodan i pomalo otpadnik". in: Knežević, Boban. Slutnja androida, izabrane priče, 2003.
