= The Door Within =

Christian fantasy trilogy by Wayne Thomas Batson

First volume of the trilogy

The Door Within is a Christian fantasy trilogy by American young-adult fiction author Wayne Thomas Batson, published between 2005 and 2006. The series was published by Thomas Nelson.

In 2007, the series was featured in a Washington Post article about the increasing popularity at the time of Christian fantasy novels. The first book of the trilogy was also reviewed by the Pittsburgh Post-Gazette in August of the same year. The following year, the trilogy received praise from the Tuscaloosa News, citing it as one of several recent releases contributing to an "explosive interest in religious books" and an acceptance of Christian fiction in mainstream retail outlets.

== Books ==
- The Door Within (released on April 8, 2005)
- Rise of the Wyrm Lord (released on July 10, 2006)
- The Final Storm (released on September 11, 2006)

== Premise ==
In a parallel universe known as "the Realm," humanoid inhabitants known as "Glimpses" correspond to each person on Earth in general appearance, personality, allegiance/beliefs, and time of death, though not necessarily in age. Glimpses have white skin and eyes that change color according to their loyalties. If a human chooses to believe that the "Story" of the Realm (also known as The Book of Alleble) is true, the Glimpse will side with King Eliam, the Godlike king of Alleble, whereupon its eyes glint blue; if a human chooses to scorn the Story, the Glimpse sides with the rebel Paragor (a Lucifer-like character who is the principal villain of the series), whereupon its eyes glint red; if the human does not choose either, the Glimpse will remain independent and its eyes will glint green. Similarly, if the Glimpse changes its loyalty, the human changes its opinion. The color signifying loyalty can only be seen when the Glimpse moves or from a sideways angle; when seen from the front, Glimpse eyes are as various in color as human eyes, and may or may not match those of the human to whom a Glimpse corresponds.

Upon dying, each Glimpse is united with its human and transcends both worlds in favor of an afterlife. Followers of King Eliam join their master in a world known as the 'Sacred Realm Beyond the Sun', whereas followers of Paragor become imprisoned beneath his citadel, behind the 'Gates of Despair'.

In the third book of the series, The Final Storm, the two worlds reunite into one, so that all separation and distinction between each Glimpse and the human to which it corresponds ceases to exist.

== Audiobooks ==
On April 5, 2008, Wayne Thomas Batson announced on The Realm Forums that Thomas Nelson (publisher) would be producing an audiobook series of the trilogy. Availability will be on CD, Audible and iTunes, and the release date was scheduled for October 2010–January 2011.
