= Chronicles of the Raven =

Novel trilogy by James Barclay

Chronicles of the Raven is the first of two fantasy book series by James Barclay which revolves around a band of mercenaries named The Raven.

The trilogy consists of three novels set in the world of Balaia:

- Dawnthief. Gollancz, 2002.
- Noonshade. Pyr, 2009.
- Nightchild. Pyr, 2009.

== Plot ==
=== Dawnthief ===
The mercenary band known as The Raven, having been successfully together for about ten years, meets the Xeteskian Mage Denser. They learn of the approaching danger of the Wesmen and their shaman and set off on a quest to collect objects needed to perform the spell Dawnthief, which will effectively take away the shaman's powers. Along the way they are captured by the Black Wings, a radical group against all magic, suffering some losses but also acquiring new members, including the Dordovan mage Erienne Malanvai, thief Will Begman, elf Jandyr and shapechanger Thraun. The mercenary band travel to the ancient city of Parve in the West of Balaia and successfully cast the Dawnthief spell.

=== Noonshade ===
Denser, just to make sure the Wytch Lords don't come back, opened a dimensional rip leading to nowhere. But he had unknowingly opened it into Sha-kaan's dimension. The Raven have to close the dimensional rip hovering above Parve, which is growing. If they fail, the Khaan brood won't be able to hold the other, larger broods off.
