= Sever Hall =

- Sever Hall, Harvard University
- U.S. National Register of Historic Places
- U.S. National Historic Landmark
- U.S. Historic district – Contributing property
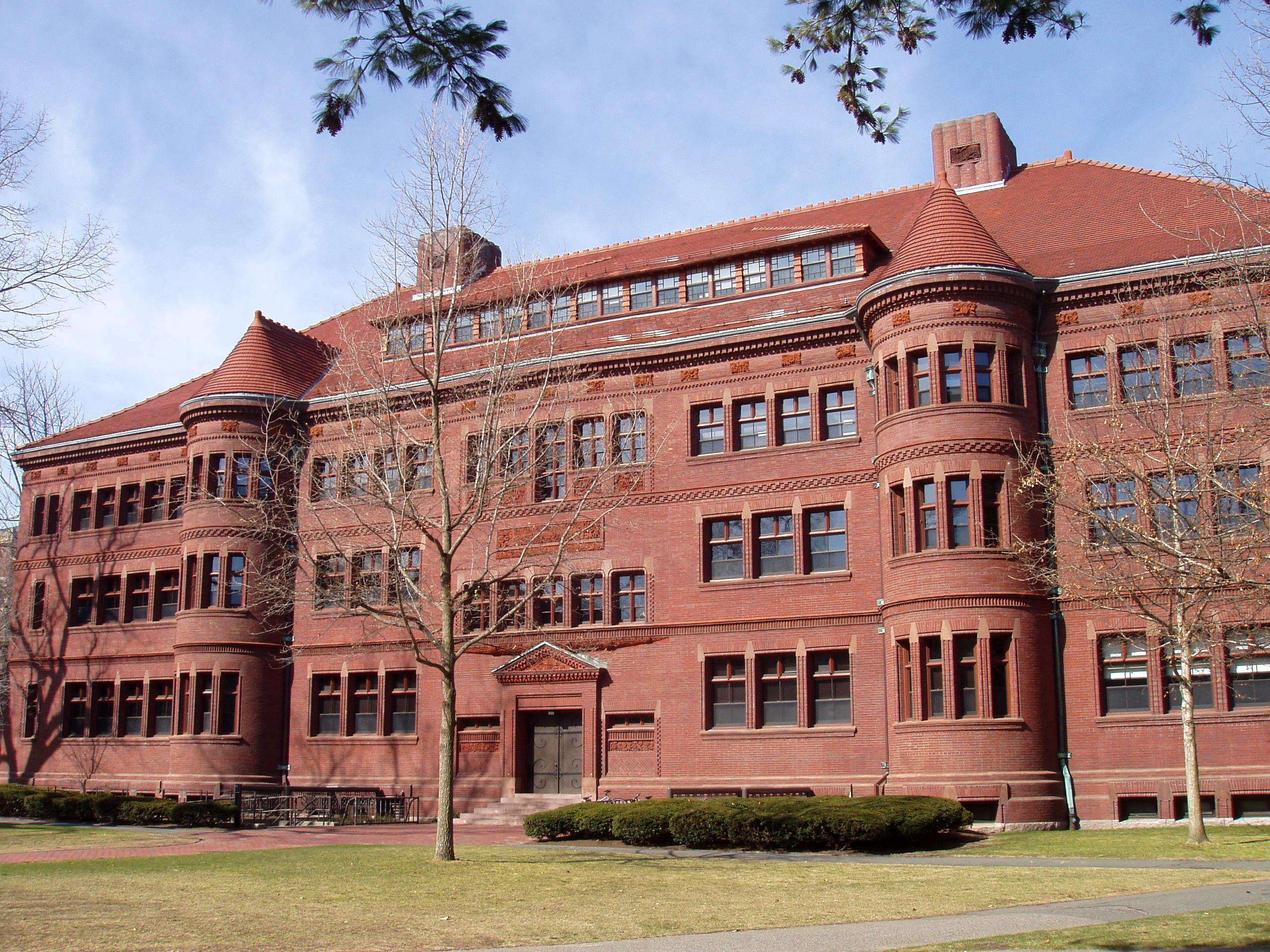
- Sever Hall, east facade.
- Location: Cambridge, Massachusetts
- Coordinates: 42°22′27.7″N 71°06′55.7″W
- Built: 1878
- Architect: Henry Hobson Richardson
- Architectural style: Romanesque Revival
- Part of: Harvard Yard Historic District (ID87002137)
- NRHP reference No.: 70000732

Significant dates
- Added to NRHP: December 30, 1970
- Designated NHL: December 30, 1970
- Designated CP: December 14, 1987

Sever Hall is an academic building at Harvard University designed by the American architect H. H. Richardson and built in the late 1870s. It is located in Harvard Yard in Cambridge, Massachusetts. It was designated a National Historic Landmark in 1970, recognized as one of Richardson's mature masterpieces.

== History ==
Sever Hall was built from 1878 to 1880 with a gift from Anne Sever in honor of her deceased husband, James Warren Sever. It was designed as an academic building with classrooms, lecture halls, rooms for professors, etc., in a style now known as Richardsonian Romanesque though in red brick rather than stone.

The building is 176 feet and 4 inches long, by 74 feet and 4 inches wide, with a height to cornice of about 50 feet, above which the hipped roof rises a further 30 feet. It is three stories tall, with a fourth story set within the roof. The main facade (west side) features two round bays set symmetrically about an entrance within a deeply recessed semi-circular archway. The east facade is similar but with a simpler, rectangular entrance. North and south facades are relatively austere expanses punctuated with windows.

About 1.3 million bricks were used in its construction. Of these, some 100,000 form the exterior facades, which feature 60 different varieties of red molded brick, as well as elaborate brick carvings. Blood mortar was used as a joiner originally, though polybond compounds have been used in restoration efforts since 1967.

The archway admitting entrance into the west facade possesses an acoustical oddity. Whispering directly into the bricks of the archway, while standing very close to one side of the arch, can be heard clearly on the other side of the arch (approximately twelve feet away).

In recent years, there has been renewed interest in Sever Hall among architectural historians, due to Robert Venturi's comment that it is his "favorite building in America." He told Boston Globe critic Robert Campbell: "I have come to understand the validity of architecture as generic shelter rather than abstract-expressive sculpture, and as flexible loft for accommodating evolving functions. ... And then I love Sever Hall also for its aesthetic tension deriving from its vital details. I could stand and look at it all day. Thank you, H.H. Richardson."

== Usage ==
Sever has small classrooms and larger lecture halls, so it is mostly used as a general-purpose classroom building for humanities courses especially small sections, beginning language courses, and Harvard Extension School classes. Grossman Library, a non-circulating library serving Extension School students, was located on the third floor until Extension School library services were integrated into Harvard Faculty of Arts and Sciences libraries in the late 2010s. The fourth floor of Sever, unnoticed by many of its students as the central stairwell does not lead to it, contains offices for Harvard's Visual and Environmental Studies department. In the evenings and on weekends student groups hold meetings or run annual events. One of Sever's notable annual events is Vericon, run during the break between semesters by the Harvard-Radcliffe Science-Fiction Association, though it has not been hosted since 2016.

== Gallery ==
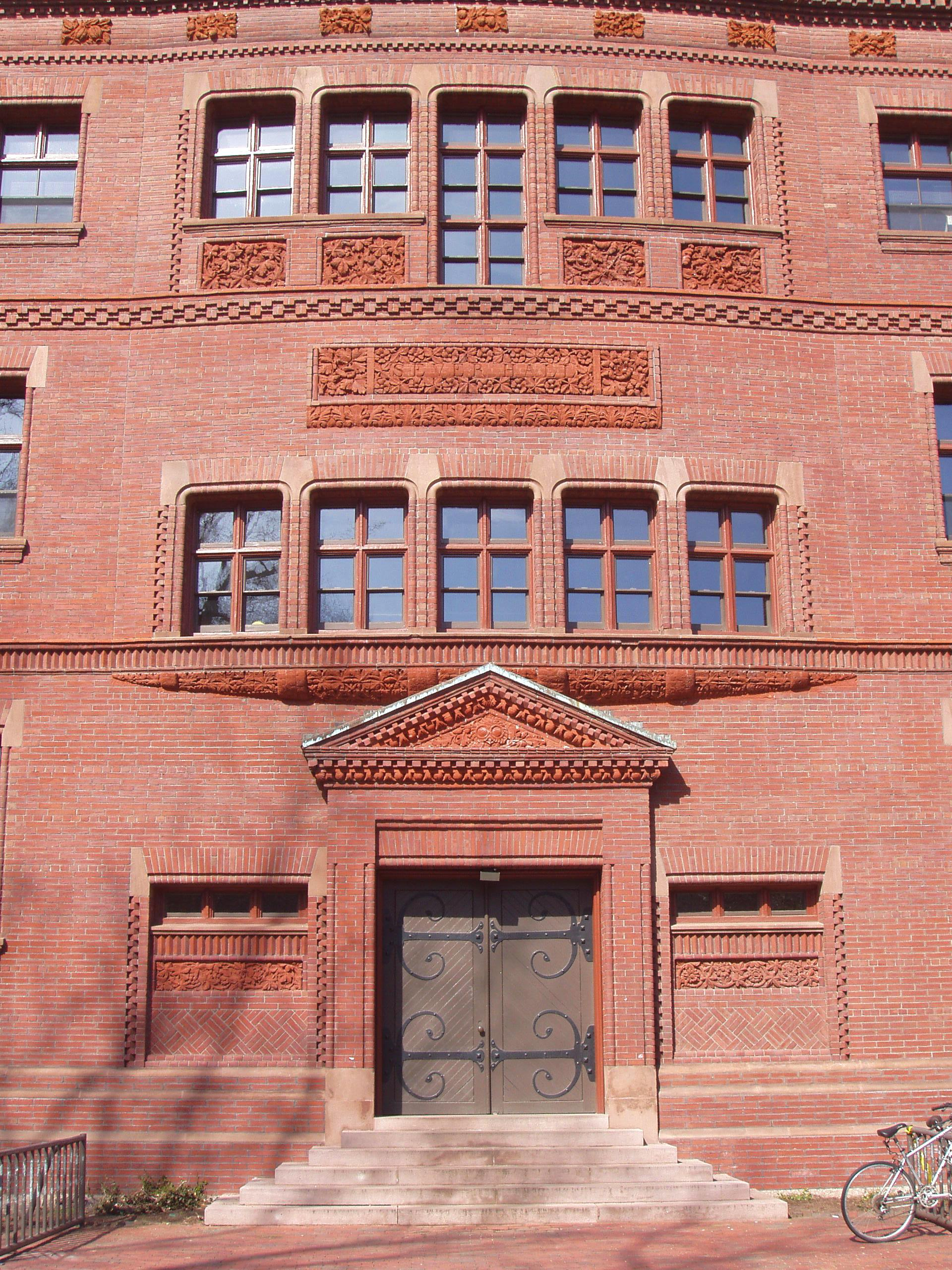
East facade entrance.

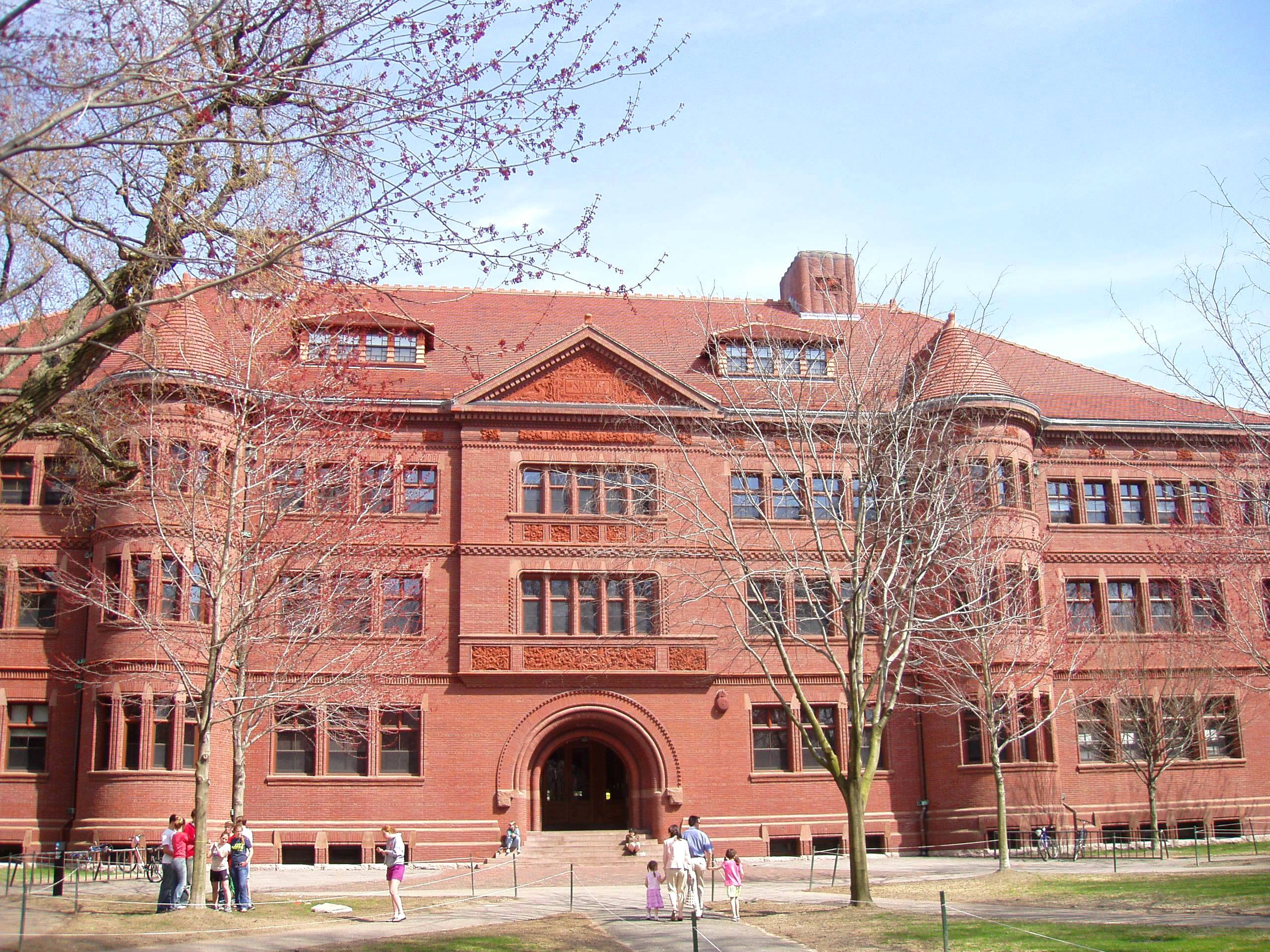
West facade

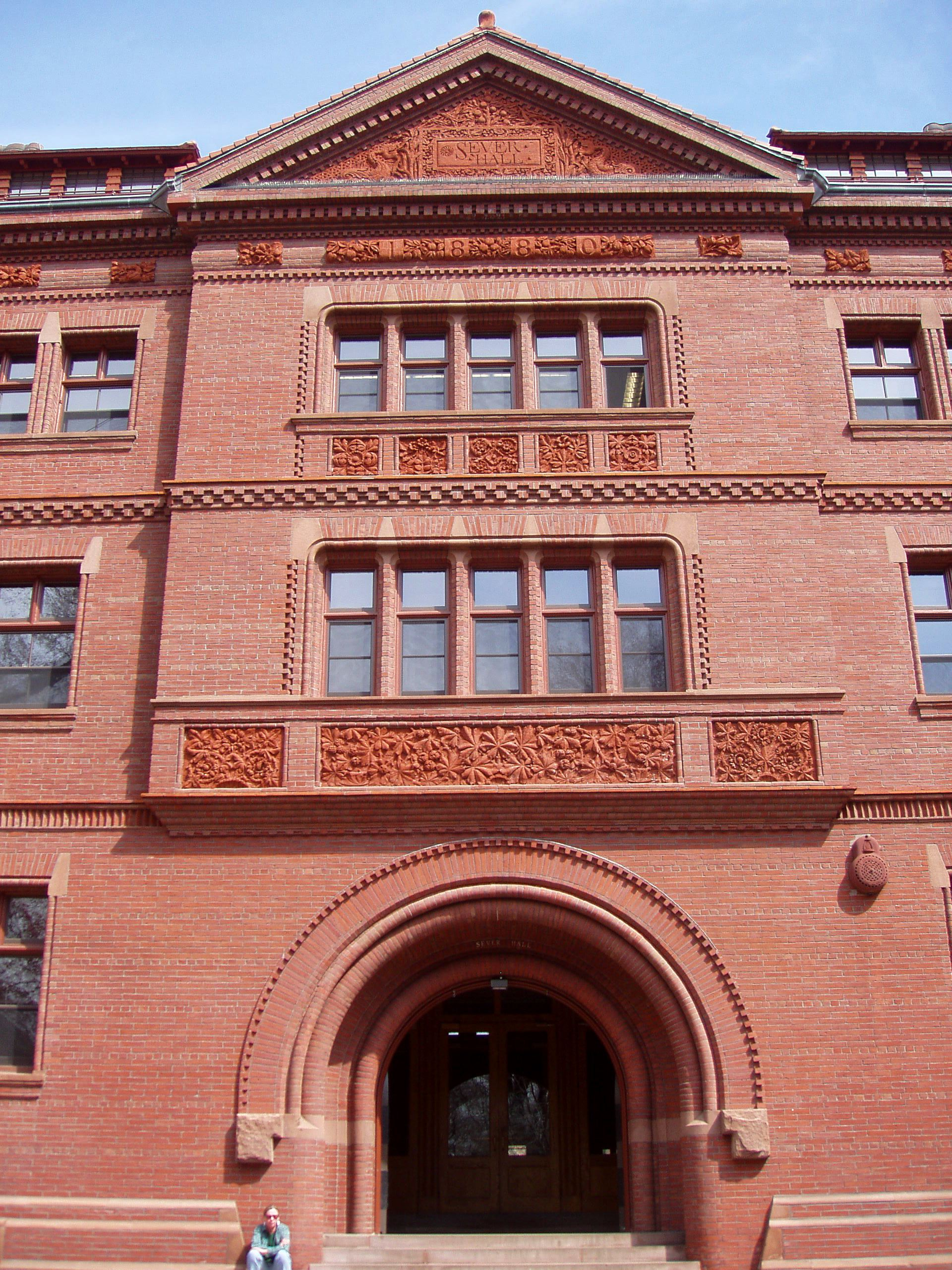
West facade entrance

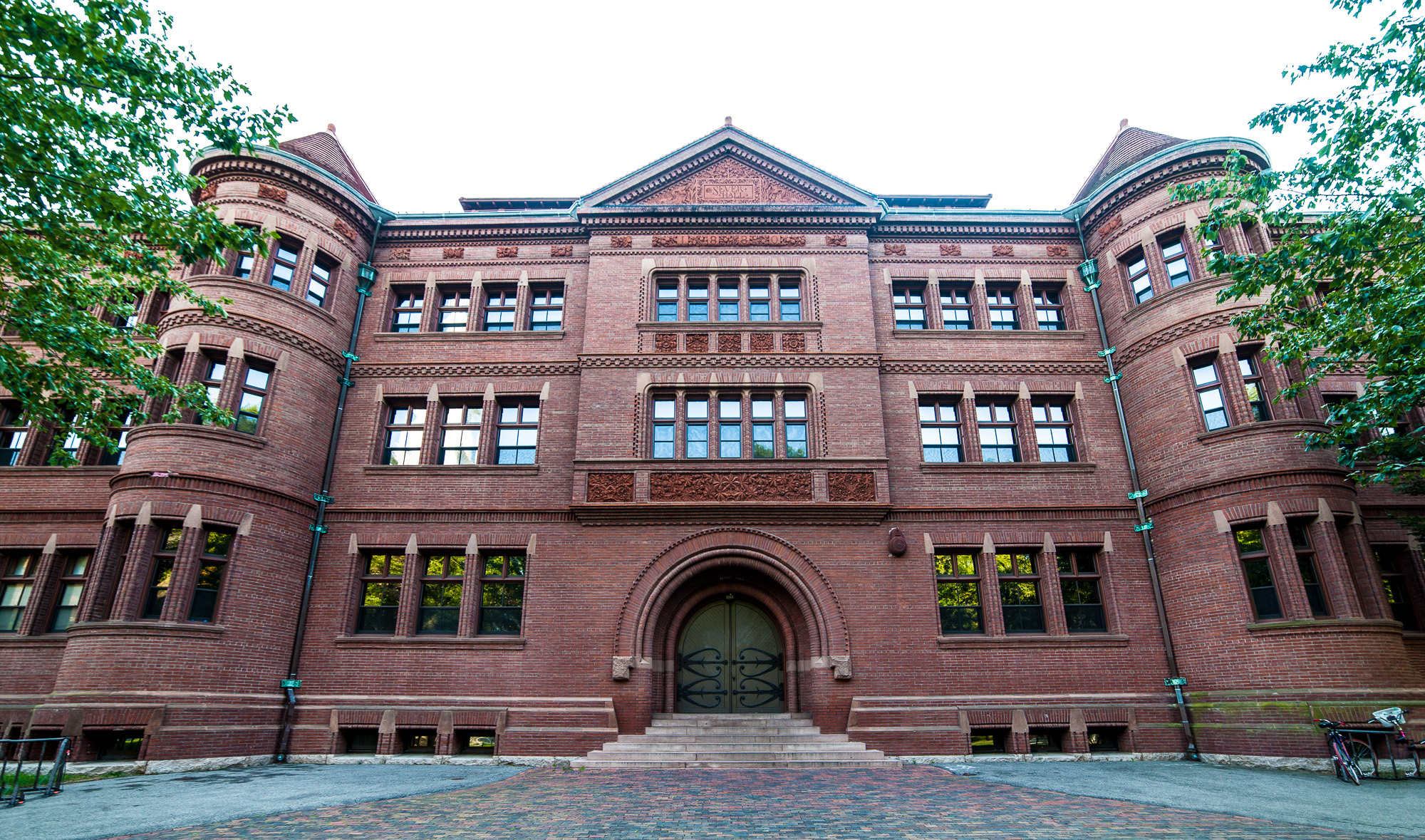
Sever Hall west facade

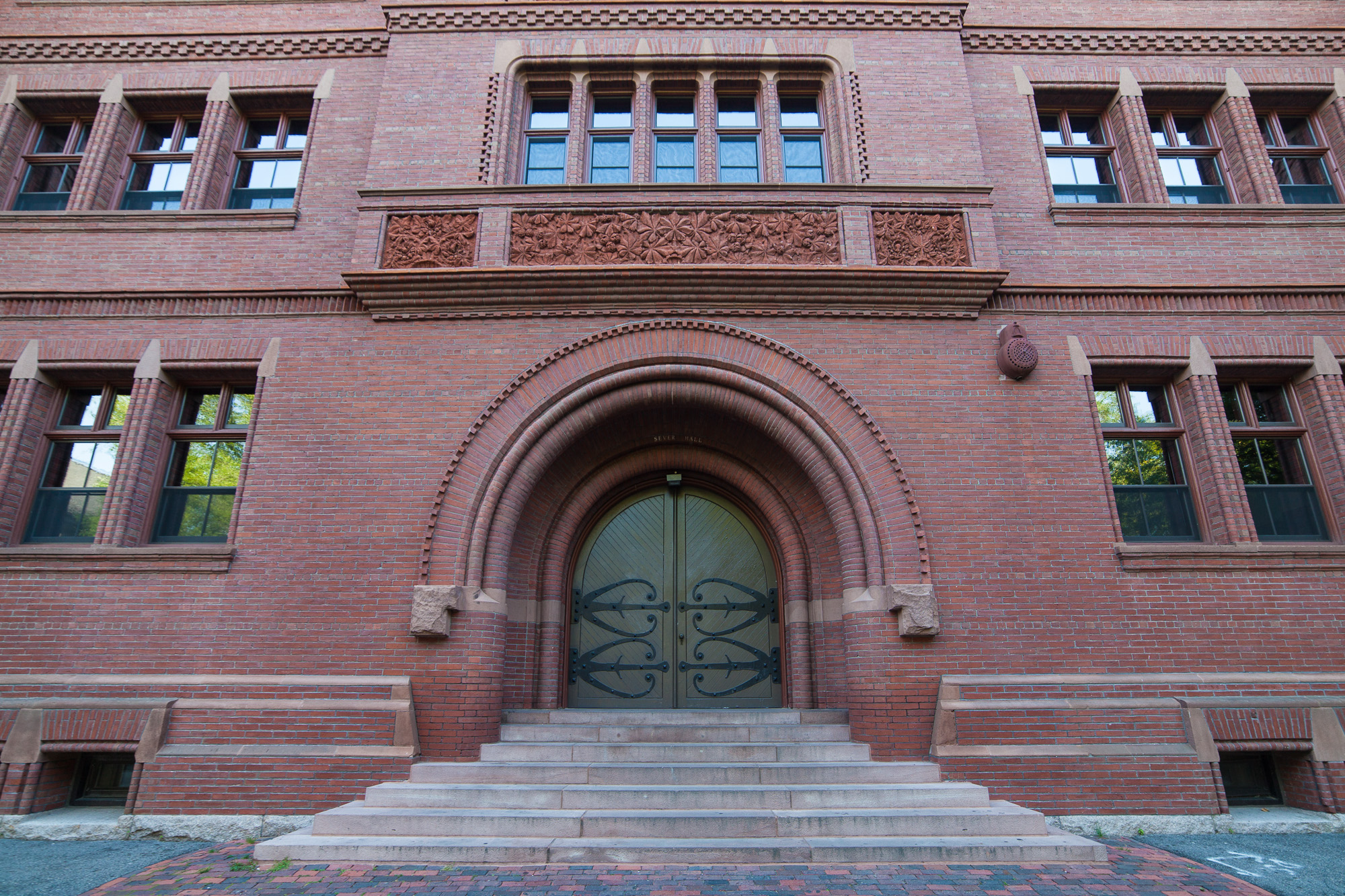
Detail of west side entrance

== See also ==
- List of National Historic Landmarks in Massachusetts
- National Register of Historic Places listings in Cambridge, Massachusetts

== Bibliography ==
- Moses King, The Harvard Register, Harvard University, 1880, page 35.
- Roger H. Clark and Michael Pause, Precedents in Architecture, New York: Van Nostrand Reinhold, 1985. ISBN 0-442-21668-8.
- Jeffrey Karl Ochsner, H. H. Richardson, Complete Architectural Works, Cambridge, Massachusetts: MIT Press, 1982.
