= Vericon =

Science fiction convention at Harvard University

- Status: Defunct
- Genre: Science fiction
- Venue: Harvard University
- Location: Cambridge, Massachusetts
- Country: United States
- Website: http://www.vericon.org/

Vericon was an annual science fiction convention at Harvard University, organized by the Harvard–Radcliffe Science Fiction Association. Lasting over a three-day weekend, for the first nine years of its existence it took place on the last weekend of January; for 2010, however, it was moved to mid-March to accommodate changes in Harvard College's academic calendar. It was described as the largest college-based science fiction convention in the United States.

Vericon was held most recently in 2016.

The convention featured anime, boardgames, cosplay, Human Chess, dances, LARPs, and RPGs. The convention was unusual for a college science fiction convention in that in addition to gaming, a number of prominent people involved in the genres of science fiction, fantasy, game design, and comics were invited each year to host panels and readings. Guests included:

- 2016 (March 18–20): Ann Leckie, John Chu, Wesley Chu, Pamela Dean, Seth Dickinson, Greer Gilman, Malka Older, Ada Palmer, Jo Walton, Fran Wilde
- 2015 (March 20–22): Ken Liu, M. L. Brennan, Carl Engle-Laird, Greer Gilman, Mary Robinette Kowal, Andrew Liptak, B. L. Marsh, Will McIntosh, Daniel José Older, Ada Palmer, Luke Scull, Alex Shvartsman, Jo Walton
- 2014 (March 21–23): Patrick Rothfuss, Max Gladstone, Jo Walton, Scott Lynch, M. L. Brennan, Shira Lipkin, Saladin Ahmed, Luke Scull, Greer Gilman
- 2013 (March 22–24): Tamora Pierce, Jeffrey Carver, Greer Gilman, N. K. Jemisin, Shira Lipkin, Seanan McGuire, Jennifer Pelland, Jo Walton
- 2012 (March 16–18): Vernor Vinge, Greer Gilman, Lev Grossman, Jennifer Pelland, Thomas Sniegoski, R.L. Stine, Aaron Diaz, Christopher Hastings, Michael Terracciano
- 2011 (March 18–20): Brandon Sanderson, Austin Grossman, Holly Black, Catherine Asaro, Sarah Smith, Ellen Kushner, Delia Sherman
- 2010 (March 19–21): Timothy Zahn, Katherine Howe, Resa Nelson, Paul G. Tremblay, Greer Gilman, John Crowley, Randall Munroe, Dorothy Gambrell, Michael Terracciano.
- 2009 (January 23–25): Kim Stanley Robinson, Elizabeth Bear, Paul Di Filippo, Allen Steele, Robert V. S. Redick, Catherynne M. Valente, Don D'Ammassa, Marie Brennan, Brad Guigar, Kris Straub
- 2008 (January 25–27): Orson Scott Card, Lois Lowry, M. T. Anderson, Elizabeth Haydon, James Patrick Kelly, Kelly Link, Donna Jo Napoli, Sharyn November, Cassandra Clare, William Sleator, Pete Abrams, Jeph Jacques, Randall Munroe
- 2007 (January 26–28): Guy Gavriel Kay, R. A. Salvatore, Jeffrey Carver, Sharyn November, Shaenon K. Garrity, Jeffrey Rowland
- 2006 (January 27–29): George R. R. Martin, Greer Gilman, Elaine Isaak, Marie Brennan, Sarah Smith, Tim Buckley, R. K. Milholland, Jeph Jacques, Michael Terracciano
- 2005 (January 28–30): Jacqueline Carey, Patrick Nielsen Hayden, Teresa Nielsen Hayden, James K. Morrow, James Alan Gardner, Debra Doyle, James D. Macdonald
- 2004 (January 30 – February 1): Mike Carey, Brian Clevinger, Peter David
- 2003 (January 24–26): Catherine Asaro, Julie Czerneda, Ellen Kushner, Charles Vess
- 2002 (January 25–27): Henry Jenkins, Scott McCloud, Terry Moore, Susan Shwartz
- 2001 (January 26–28): Pete Abrams, James Ernest, Paul Levinson, Margaret Weis, Don Perrin, Michael A. Burstein, Jeffrey Carver, Esther Friesner, Peter Heck, James K. Morrow, Donna Jo Napoli
