= Suvudu =

- Company type: Subsidiary of Random House, Inc.
- Industry: Books, Publishing, Blogs
- Genre: Science fiction, Fantasy, Comics, Gaming
- Founded: July 18, 2008
- Headquarters: New York City, USA
- Key people: Shawn C. Speakman (blogger); Matt Staggs (Blogger)
- Website: www.Suvudu.com

Suvudu was a genre site created by Random House, to provide additional content, such as author interviews, chats, chapter previews, reviews, previews, and news around science fiction, fantasy, comics, graphic novels, and video game guides and books published by Random House across all of its imprints.

== Background & history ==
Suvudu was launched on July 18, 2008, with the intent of featuring science fiction, fantasy, comics, graphic novels, and gaming titles and authors across all of Random House, Inc.'s, divisions and imprints. Authors and titles from Del Rey, Spectra, Pantheon Books, and Random House Children's Books are frequently featured.

In its introductory post, Suvudu stated it would be a "website catering to news from all sci-fi and fantasy creative media—books, audiobooks, gaming, manga, comic books and movies! Content will include podcasts, videos, reviews, interviews and original blog posts, all brought to you by some of the best talents in the sci-fi, fantasy, graphic novel and gaming industries."

While the site is a property of Random House, Inc., and features titles published by that company prominently, Suvudu has featured authors and works from other publishing companies. Suvudu's staff is almost entirely in-house, featuring Random House employees across several disciplines, including editorial, art, publicity, and web production. Suvudu also uses content from a handful of freelance bloggers as well as posts by authors.

In February 2009, Suvudu was named one of MediaBistro's Six Stellar Publishing Company Blogs. In naming the site, MediaBistro wrote:

"For science fiction and fantasy fans, Random House's Suvudu has grown into a fan-focused website with a fairly active comments section--a rare sense of community for a publisher blog."

== Types of content ==
Suvudu offers several different types of content regularly, including live author chats, author interviews, and feature articles.

=== Live author chats ===
Authors who have appeared are:

- Kelley Armstrong
  - Suvudu Live Chat: Paranormal Roundtable
- Christopher Paolini
  - Christopher Paolini and Terry Brooks Live Chat, including a follow-up Q&A with additional questions from the chat: Chat follow-up: Christopher Paolini answers your questions
- Terry Brooks
  - Christopher Paolini and Terry Brooks Live Chat, including a follow-up Q&A from his chat with Christopher Paolini with additional questions from the chat: Chat follow-up: Terry Brooks answers your questions
  - Terry Brooks Live Chat
- R. A. Salvatore, author chat
- Eoin Colfer, author chat
- Naomi Novik and Scott Westerfeld, Naomi Novik and Scott Westerfeld Live Chat
- China Miéville, author chat
- Peter Brett
  - Peter Brett & Robert Redick Author Chat
  - Suvudu's Live RPG
- Robert V.S. Redick, author of The Red Wolf Conspiracy, Peter Brett & Robert Redick Author Chat
- Dave Roman and Raina Telgemeier, Dave Roman & Raina Telgemeier Author Chat
- David Anthony Durham, author chat
- Daniel Wallace, author of many Star Wars Essential Guides, and Jason Fry, co-author of Star Wars Essential Atlas
  - Jason Fry and Dan Wallace Live Chat
- Harry Connolly, author chat
- Nina Matsumoto, Eisner Award-winning artist and author, author chat
- Diana Rowland
  - Suvudu's Live RPG
  - Suvudu's Paranormal Roundtable
- Ari Marmell
  - Suvudu's Live RPG
- Carolyn Crane
  - Suvudu's Paranormal Roundtable
- Lucy A. Snyder
  - Suvudu's Paranormal Roundtable
- Jenna Black
  - Suvudu's Paranormal Roundtable
- Alex Prentiss
  - Suvudu's Paranormal Roundtable

=== Feature articles ===
Suvudu features a number of recurring feature articles and series. They are:

==== '365 Days of Manga' by Jason Thompson ====
Author and blogger Jason Thompson posts daily manga reviews under the feature headline "365 Days of Manga." When launched on September 16, 2009, Thompson wrote that the feature would be "the online continuation of (his book) Manga: The Complete Guide!" The feature is planned to run one year and will encompass many different types of manga. The reviews are generally short, running only one paragraph, and conclude with each featured manga title being assigned a star value with a maximum of four stars possible for work deemed to be of the highest quality.

==== 'New releases' ====
Posted every Tuesday, to coincide with the publication schedules for Random House, this post gives an overview of the books that will be newly available that week. The post also includes relevant genre release news for other books, movies, DVD releases, and video games of note.

==== 'What I Learned This Week' by Betsy Mitchell ====
Betsy Mitchell, editor-in-chief of Del Rey books, contributes articles in this series relating various items and/or lessons related to her work. These have included details about forthcoming books and projects ("What Diana Gabaldon's Jamie Fraser really looks like!"), tips on writing and publication ("A good cover letter is hard to find (part 1)", "A good cover letter is hard to find (part 2)", and "The Importance of First Sentences" to name a few), as well as musings and ruminations on the science fiction and fantasy genres ("How hard it is to come up with a great title!", "Why I Say No", and "The Debate Over DRM").

=== Author interviews and readings ===
Suvudu routinely conducts author interviews, typically involving Random House authors, though occasionally including outside authors as well. Some interviews are quick, five-question pieces focusing on an author's latest project or writing advice, while others are more in-depth. Suvudu also uses personal video recorders to record video interviews with authors, typically at events such as author readings or conventions.

Additionally, Suvudu has recorded and posted readings from several authors including Terry Brooks, Steven Erikson, Brian Sanderson, Naomi Novik, R. A. Salvatore, Jacqueline Carey, and Dan Simmons.

=== Suvudu Free Story Library ===
Suvudu began a Free Library program on March 4, 2009. The program offered the first book in a series by Random House, Inc., authors for free in a variety of formats, such as Stanza, Rich Text Files, and PDF files. Partnering with Random House in this effort, prices were also reduced to free on Amazon (for Kindle readers), Sony (for Sony Readers), and Barnes & Noble (Nook).

Over time, the Free Library also began to include original short fiction, including fiction from The Magazine of Fantasy & Science Fiction as the result of a partnership between the two entities. On January 8, 2010, Suvudu and the Magazine of Fantasy & Science Fiction announced their new partnership saying:

"An agreement between the two allows Suvudu's visitors access to one story from each issue of the magazine via Suvudu's Free Library, which also offers full-length novels from the Del Rey, Spectra, and other Random House lists."
