= Clarence Major =

American poet, painter and novelist (born 1936)

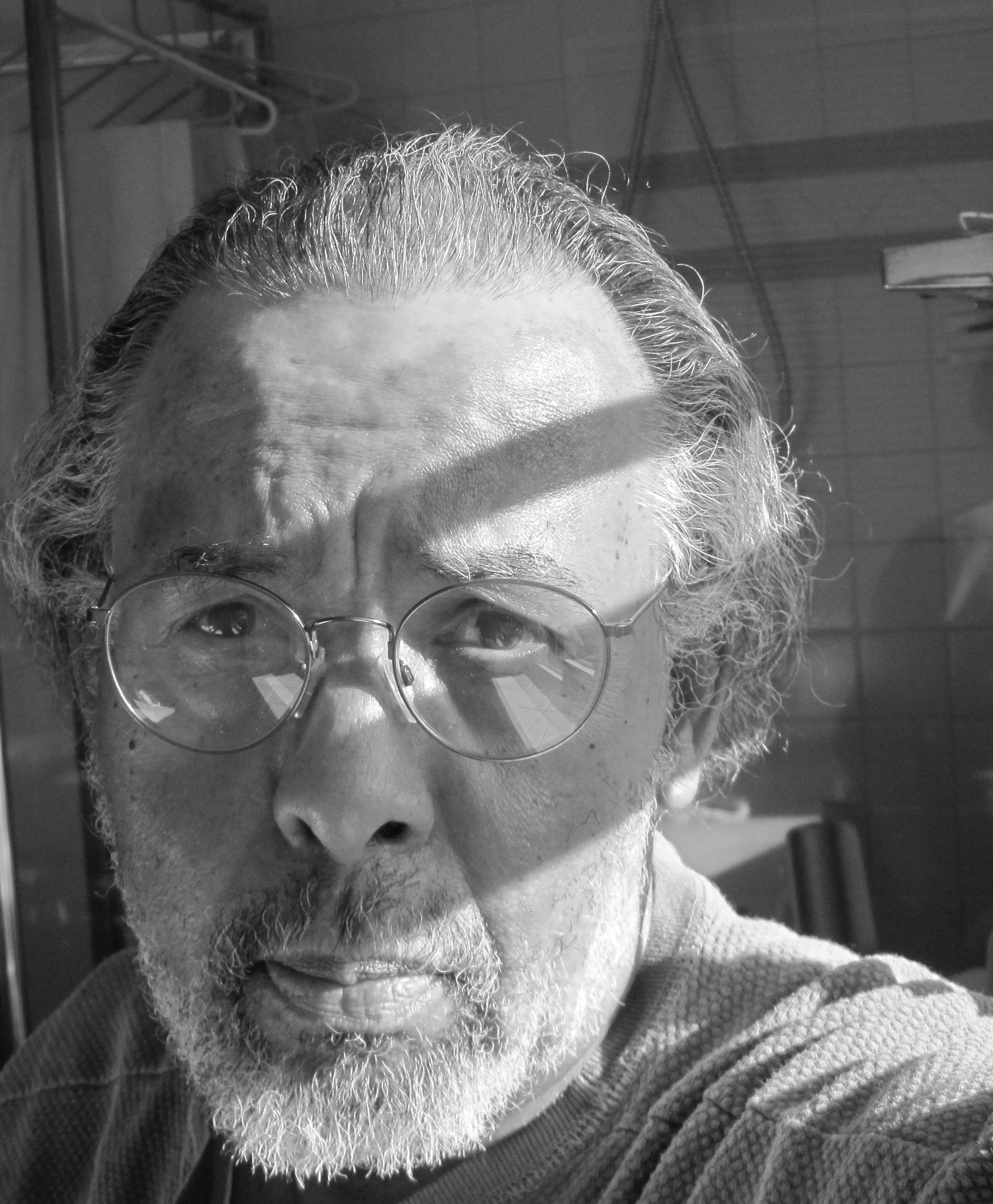
- Major in 2017
- Born: December 31, 1936 (age 89); Atlanta, Georgia, U.S.
- Occupations: Poet, painter, and novelist
- Spouse: Pamela Ritter Major (m. 1980)
- Children: 6
- Awards: PEN Oakland/Reginald Lockett Lifetime Achievement Award, 2016
- Website: clarencemajor.com

Clarence Major (born December 31, 1936) is an American poet, painter, and novelist; and winner of the 2015 "Lifetime Achievement Award in the Fine Arts", presented by the Congressional Black Caucus Foundation. He was awarded the 2016 PEN Oakland/Reginald Lockett Lifetime Achievement Award.

== Biography ==
Clarence Major was born on December 31, 1936, in Atlanta, Georgia, and grew up in Chicago.

Major is distinguished professor emeritus of 20th-Century American Literature at the University of California, Davis. His literary archives are in the Givens Collection of African American Literature, Anderson Library of Rare Books and Manuscripts, University of Minnesota.

== Teaching ==
Major has taught literature and/or creative writing at Brooklyn College, New York University, Queens College, Sarah Lawrence College, University of Washington, Howard University, University of Maryland, University of Colorado, Temple University, Binghamton University, the University of California at Davis and on a Fulbright-Hays Exchange award he taught American culture at the University of Nice, in France, 1981–1983. He left the University of Colorado in 1989 and he taught at the University of California, Davis, for 18 years before his retirement in 2007.

== Recognition ==
Major won a National Council on the Arts Award for his poetry collection Swallow the Lake in 1970, and the following year was awarded a New York Cultural Foundation grant for poetry. Reflexe et Ossature (1982), the French translation of Reflex and Bone Structure (1975), was nominated for the Prix Maurice Coindreau (1982). Such Was The Season (1987) was a Literary Guild book club selection in 1988. The same year, The New York Times Book Review recommended it on its annual "Summer Reading" list. Painted Turtle: Woman With Guitar (1988) was cited by The New York Times Book Review as a "Notable Book of The Year" 1988. In 1990, his short-story collection, Fun & Games, was nominated for the Los Angeles Book Critics Award.

Major won a Bronze Medal as a finalist for the National Book Award in 1999 for Configurations: New and Selected Poems 1958–1998 (Copper Canyon Press). He won the Pushcart Prize for the short story "My Mother and Mitch", in 1989. In 2002, he won the Stephen Henderson Poetry Award for Outstanding Achievement, presented by the African American Literature and Culture Society. His 1986 novel My Amputations won the Western States Book Award and was republished in 2008 with an introduction by Lawrence Hogue. Dirty Bird Blues won the Sister Circle Book Award in 1999.

Major was awarded the International Literary Hall of Fame award (Chicago State University) in 2001. He received the "2015 Lifetime Achievement Award in the Fine Arts" from the Congressional Black Caucus Foundation. He was awarded the 26th annual PEN Oakland/Reginald Lockett Lifetime Achievement Award on December 3, 2016. In January 2017, From Now On: New and Selected Poems was nominated for the 2017 Northern California Book Award sponsored by The Northern California Independent Booksellers Association.

In 2021, Major was inducted into the Georgia Writers Hall of Fame.

== Anthologies ==
In a 1989 review for The New York Times, Major stated: "At best, as with magazines, literary anthologies can keep the reader in touch with the esthetic temperament of the time." He has edited several anthologies, most recently Calling the Wind: 20th Century African-American Short Stories (1993) and The Garden Thrives: 20th Century African-American Poetry (1996). His own work has appeared in The Norton Anthology of American Literature and The Pushcart Prize: The Best of The Small Presses, among others.

== Periodicals ==
Major's fiction, poetry, nonfiction and book reviews have appeared in periodicals, including The New Yorker, Harvard Review, The New York Times Book Review, and The Literary Review.

== Visual arts ==
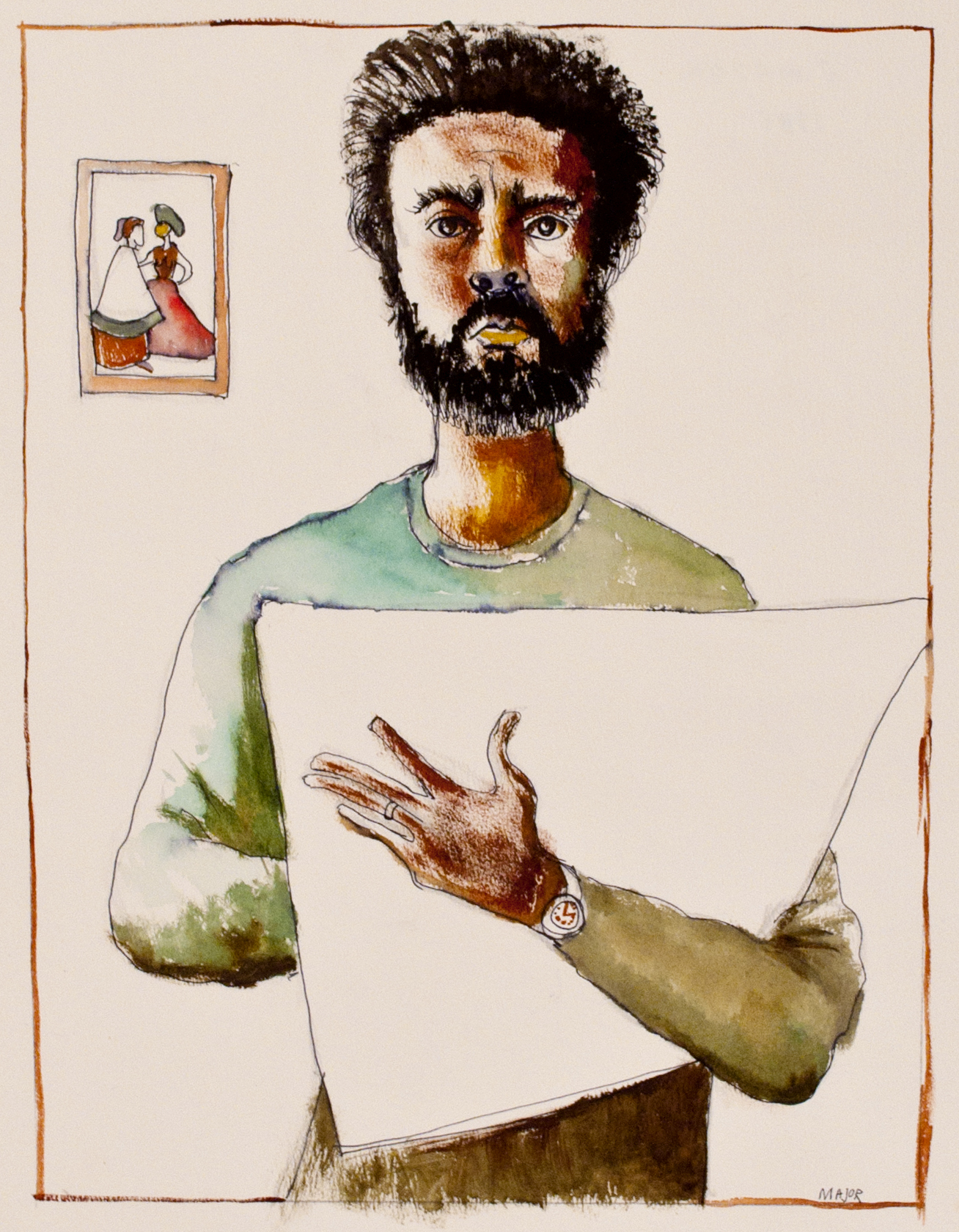
Self-portrait by Clarence Major

Major studied drawing and painting under the direction of painter Gus Nall (1919–1995) from 1952 to 1954. Major also attended sketch and lecture classes during the same period in Fullerton Hall at the Art Institute of Chicago. Among his teachers there was Addis Osborne (1914–2011).

=== Education ===
Major has attended or received degrees from the following institutions:

- A Art Institute of Chicago (James Nelson Raymond scholar), 1952–54.
- Gus Nall Studio, Private Art Lessons, 1950–1954.
- The New School for Social Research (French course only), 1971.
- Norwalk Community College, Norwalk Connecticut, 1972.
- Howard University, Washington D.C., 1974–1975.
- State University of New York, Albany, B.S. 1976.
- Union Institute & University, Yellow Springs and Cincinnati, Ohio, Ph.D. 1978.

== Bibliography ==
=== Novels ===
- All-Night Visitors, Northeastern University Press (1969, 1998), ISBN 9781555533670
- No, Emerson Hall (1973), ISBN 9780878290062
- Reflex and Bone Structure (1975, 1996), ISBN 9781562790844
- Emergency Exit (1979), ISBN 9780914590590
- My Amputations (1986, 2008), ISBN 9781573661430
- Such Was the Season (1987, 2003), ISBN 9780916515683
- Painted Turtle: Woman With Guitar (1988, 2015), ISBN 9780826356000
- Dirty Bird Blues, Berkley Publishing Group (1996, 1997), ISBN 9780425159033; ISBN 9781562790837
- One Flesh, Kensington (2003), ISBN 9780758204738
- The Lurking Place, Manic D Press (2021), ISBN 9781945665288
- Thunderclouds in the Forecast, Northwestern University Press (2021), ISBN 9780810144262
- Dirty Bird Blues (2023), Penguin Classics, ISBN 9780143136590
- The Glint of Light (2023), At Bay Press, Hardcover ISBN 9781988168999

=== Short story collections ===
- Fun & Games (1990), ISBN 9780930100346
- Chicago Heat and Other Stories (2016), ISBN 9780996897327
- Golden Gate and Other Stories (2023), ISBN 9798987172018

=== Poetry collections ===
- Swallow the Lake (1970), ISBN 9780819520548, ISBN 9780819510549
- Symptoms & Madness (1971), ISBN 9780870910654, ISBN 9780870910647
- Private Line (1971), Library of Congress card No. 76–160609
- The Cotton Club (1972), ISBN 9780910296625
- The Syncopated Cakewalk (1974), ISBN 9780879290245
- Inside Diameter: The France Poems (1985), ISBN 9780905258096
- Surfaces and Masks (1988), ISBN 9780918273437
- Some Observations of a Stranger at Zuni in the Latter Part of the Century (1989), ISBN 9781557130204
- Parking Lots (1992), Perishable Press limited edition handset type
- Configurations: New and Selected Poems 1958–1998, Copper Canyon Press (1998), ISBN 9781556590900
- Waiting for Sweet Betty, Copper Canyon Press (2002), ISBN 9781556591792
- Myself Painting, LSU Press (2008), ISBN 9780807133668
- Down and Up (2013), ISBN 9780820345949
- From Now On: New and Selected Poems 1970–2015 (2015), ISBN 9780820347967
- My Studio, LSU Press (2018), ISBN 9780807169001
- Sporadic Troubleshooting (2022), ISBN 9780807176108
- Four Days in Algeria (2025), ISBN 9781636281780

=== Nonfiction ===
- Dictionary of Afro-American Slang (1970), ISBN 9780717802685. Library of Congress Card Number 79-130863
- Black Slang: A Dictionary of Afro-American Talk, London: Routledge (1971), ISBN 9780710071798
- The Dark and Feeling: Black American Writers and Their Work, Okpaku Communications Corp (1974), ISBN 9780893881184
- Juba to Jive: A Dictionary of African-American Slang (1994), ISBN 9780140513066
- Necessary Distance: Essays and Criticism (2000), ISBN 9781566891097
- Come by Here: My Mother's Life, Wiley (2002), ISBN 9780471415183
- Configurations Paintings by Clarence Major (2010), limited edition exhibition catalogue
- Myself Painting Paintings by Clarence Major (2011), limited edition exhibition catalogue
- Clarence Major and His Art: Portraits of an African-American Postmodernist, ed. Bernard W. Bell (2001), ISBN 9780807848999
- The Paintings and Drawings of Clarence Major (2019), ISBN 9781496820686

=== Anthology appearances ===
- The New Black Poetry (1969), ISBN 9780717801381
- Calling the Wind: 20th Century African-American Short Stories, HarperCollins (1993), ISBN 9780060183370
- The Garden Thrives: 20th Century African-American Poetry, HarperCollins (1996), ISBN 9780060553647
- The Essential Clarence Major: Prose and Poetry, University of North Carolina Press (2020), ISBN 9781469656007
