= Co Hoedeman =

Dutch-Canadian filmmaker (1940–2025)

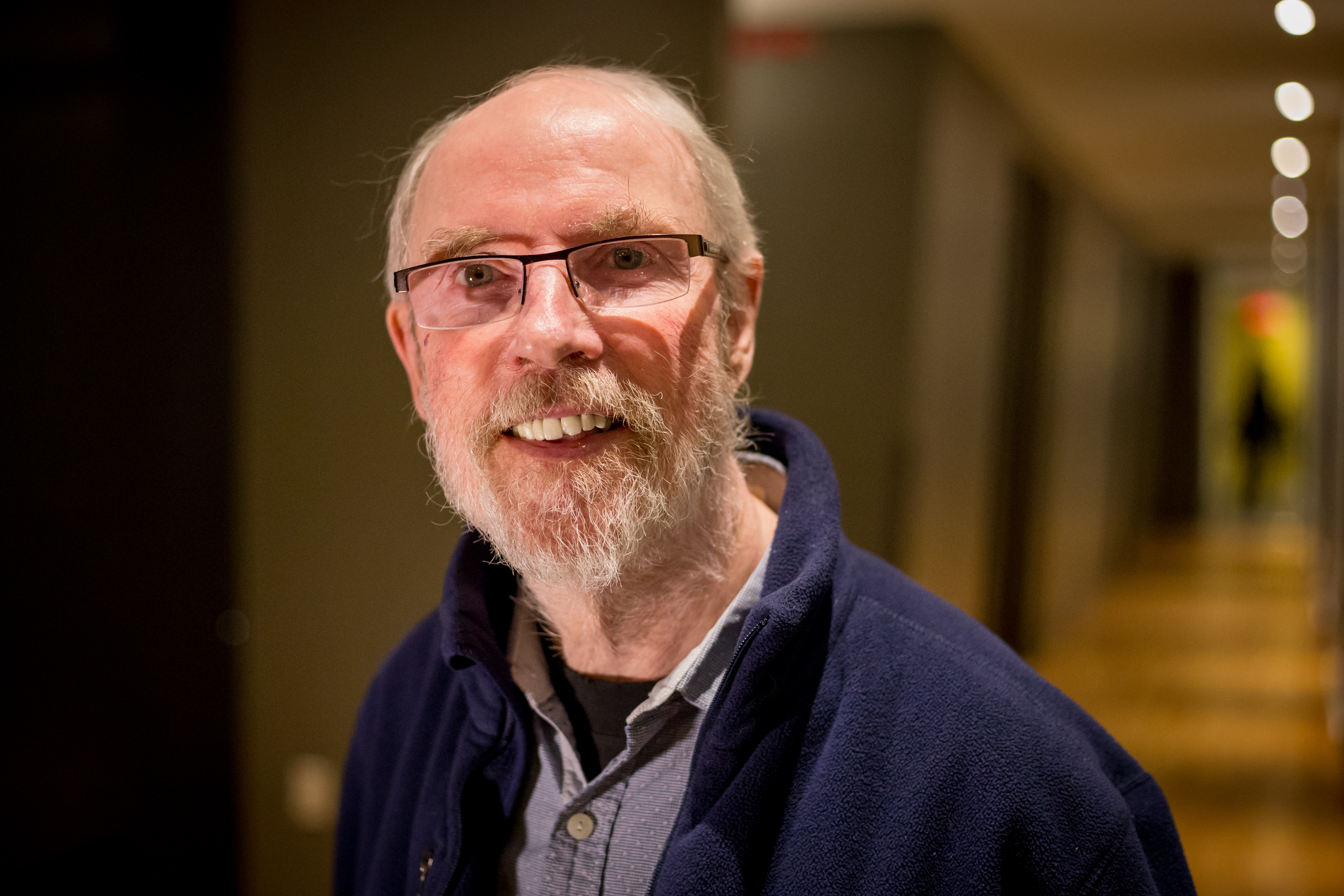
- Hoedeman in 2018
- Born: Jacobus Willem Hoedeman; 1 August 1940; Amsterdam, German-occupied Netherlands
- Died: 26 May 2025 (aged 84); Montreal, Quebec, Canada
- Occupations: Film director, writer and animator
- Awards: Academy Award for Best Animated Short Film (1977)

Jacobus Willem Hoedeman (1 August 1940 – 26 May 2025) was a Dutch-Canadian filmmaker known for his mastery of stop motion animation and technical innovation in films that reveal his close observation of human and social interaction.

== Background ==
Hoedeman was born during the German occupation of the Netherlands and survived the Hunger Winter of 1944–45, when many of Amsterdam's residents died of starvation brought on by a German blockade and other factors.

At the age of 15, Hoedeman left school to work as a photograph retoucher in the printing industry in his native Netherlands, but soon decided to try film. He first worked at Multifilm, a small production company in Haarlem, and then at Cinecentrum in Hilversum, where he worked in the optical and special effects department and helped out with camera, laboratory and sound work when he could. Hoedeman spent his evenings taking courses at the School of Fine Arts in Amsterdam and the School of Photography in The Hague. As his skills improved, he took on more complex work, including transitions and models, and eventually began designing, editing, and directing commercials.

Hoedeman immigrated to Canada in 1965 with his then-wife, on the chance that the National Film Board of Canada (NFB) might hire him. He showed up at the NFB with a reel of his previous work under his arm, and within days landed a job as a production assistant. His first major project there was an educational film called Continental Drift. He then moved to the recently created French Animation Studio and made what he called his first "real" film, Oddball, in 1969. Wanting to learn more about stop-motion animation techniques, he went to Czechoslovakia in 1970 to study puppet animation.

On his return, he produced the innovative and charming children's film Tchou-Tchou (1972), made entirely by using wooden blocks. Then, he made a series of animated films based on Inuit legends: The Man and the Giant, The Owl and the Lemming, The Owl and the Raven and Lumaaq. He collaborated closely with artists in the Arctic communities of Frobisher Bay (now called Iqaluit) and Povungnituk to illustrate the legends, using sealskin figures, soapstone carvings, and drawings.

His next project was the very ambitious The Sand Castle / Le Château de sable, a touching fable that earned him the Academy Award for Best Animated Short Film at the 50th Academy Awards. This work, which featured an array of odd creatures created from foam rubber, wire, and sand, won numerous international awards and has proven to be an enduring favourite.

Hoedeman died in Montreal, Quebec, on 26 May 2025, at the age of 84.

== Later works ==
With every film, Hoedeman experimented with new techniques and materials, including papier-mâché, paper cutouts, and computer animation.

In 1992, Hoedeman collaborated with a group of Native and Inuit inmates at La Macaza Penitentiary in northern Quebec to make The Sniffing Bear / L'Ours renifleur, a cautionary tale about substance abuse. He followed that with another serious film, The Garden of Écos / Le Jardin d'Écos, an ecological fable that shows just how easy it is to upset the balance of nature.

In 1998, Hoedeman returned to his passion – making whimsical children's films – by crafting a series of four puppet films featuring Ludovic, a sweet young teddy bear, and his family. The Snow Gift (1998), A Crocodile in My Garden (2000), Visiting Grandpa (2001), and Magic in the Air (2002) were eventually released together on DVD under the title Four Seasons in the Life of Ludovic.

His last film as an employee of the National Film Board was Marianne's Theatre (2004), which he completed after learning that he and fellow animation pioneer Jacques Drouin would both be laid off just short of retirement, victims of budget cuts and the NFB's move toward hiring filmmakers on contract, rather than supporting full-time, permanent staff.

Hoedeman acted as an independent filmmaker and consultant working on several projects, including the production of an animated TV series based on his Ludovic films.

Hoedeman is the subject of two documentary films: Nico Crama's Co Hoedeman, Animator (1980) and In the Animator's Eye: A Conjurer's Tales - Co Hoedeman (1996).

== Filmography ==
- Continental Drift – 1968
- Oddball – 1969
- Matrioska – 1970
- The Owl and the Lemming: An Eskimo Legend – 1971
- Tchou-tchou – 1972
- The Owl and the Raven: An Eskimo Legend – 1973
- Lumaaq: An Eskimo Legend – 1975
- The Man and the Giant: An Eskimo Legend – 1975
- The Sand Castle (Le château de sable) – 1977
- The Treasure of the Grotoceans (Le trésor des Grotocéans) – 1980
- Masquerade – 1984
- Charles and François – 1988
- The Box (La Boîte) – 1989
- The Sniffing Bear (L'Ours renifleur) – 1992
- The Garden of Écos (Le jardin d'Écos) – 1997
- Ludovic: The Snow Gift – 1998
- Ludovic: A Crocodile in My Garden – 2000
- Ludovic: Visiting Grandpa – 2001
- Ludovic: Magic in the Air – 2002
- Winter Days – 2003
- Marianne's Theatre (Le théâtre de Marianne) – 2004
- 55 Socks – 2011

== Bibliography ==
- Olivier Cotte (2007) Secrets of Oscar-winning animation: Behind the scenes of 13 classic short animations. (The Sand Castle / Le Château de sable) Focal Press. ISBN 978-0-240-52070-4
- Co Hoedeman (2021) Frame by Frame: An Animator's Journey At Bay Press ISBN 978-1-988-16855-5
