= The Mask of Mirrors =

2021 fantasy novel by M.A. Carrick

- Author: M.A. Carrick (Marie Brennan and Alyc Helms)
- Language: English
- Series: The Rook and Rose
- Release number: 1
- Genre: Fantasy
- Publisher: Orbit Books
- Publication date: 19 Jan 2021
- Pages: 630
- Followed by: The Liar's Knot

Brennan and Helms at World Fantasy Convention 2026

The Mask of Mirrors is a 2021 fantasy novel, the debut novel by M.A. Carrick. Carrick is a pseudonym for authors Marie Brennan and Alyc Helms, who wrote the novel jointly. It is the first novel in the Rook and Rose trilogy. It was followed by The Liar's Knot in 2021, and Labyrinth's Heart in 2023.

== Plot ==
Decades ago, the city of Nadežra is captured from the Vraszenian clans by the Liganti. A dictator named Kaius Rex rules the city. Rex paves over the Wellspring of Ažerais, a sacred Vraszenian religious site, and replaces it with an amphitheater. After his death, peace is brokered between the Vraszenian clan elders and a five-person committee called the Cinquerat. Although peace is restored, the city remains unstable, with the native Vraszenians under the control of the Liganti nobility.

After the death of her mother, a Vraszenian street urchin named Ren joins the Fingers, a gang. She and her sworn siblings Tess and Sedge survive cruelties from the gang's leader, Ondrakja. After Ondrakja beats Sedge, Ren poisons her. Ren and Tess flee the city, believing that Sedge and Ondrakja are dead. They eventually become servants in the house of Letilia, a woman estranged from her noble Nadežran family. After years as Letilia's servant, Ren and Tess steal her jewelry and return to Nadežra.

Ren disguises herself as Renata Viraudax, the fictional daughter of Letilia; Tess poses as Renata's maid. They hope to con their way into the Traementis family and become wealthy. The Traementis family has declined in numbers and wealth since Letilia left: the only remaining members are Donaia Traementis and her two children, Leato and Giuna. Ren begins to feel genuine affection for the Traementis and feels guilty about her lies. Ren and Tess reunite with Sedge, who now works for a crime boss name Derossi Vargo. Ren also interacts with the Rook, a Vraszenian folk hero who fights against Liganti corruption.

Grey Serrado, a member of the city Vigil, investigates reports that street urchins are dying from insomnia. He also mourns the death of his brother Kolya; many citizens believe that the Rook started the fire that caused Kolya's death. Vargo discovers that aža, a drug used to see the dream world, is being transformed into ash, a drug that allows people to touch the dream world directly. Ash can allow people to be killed by monsters called zlyzen, which live in the dream world.

Ren and the Rook suspect that Mettore Indestor, a member of the Cinquerat, is planning a violent uprising. On the Night of Bells, a celebration of the death of Kaius Rex, members of the Liganti elite and the Vraszenian elders are poisoned with ash. Leato Traementis and a Vraszenian clan leader are killed. Civil unrest erupts. Ren discovers that the woman behind the plague of insomnia is Ondrakja, who is using the dreams of street children to produce ash for Indestor.

With Vargo's help, Serrado learns that Indestor plans to destroy the Wellspring and blame it on a radical Vraszenian group. Indestor and Ondrakja use magic to draw the Wellspring out of the dream world and into reality. Reality and dreams begin to collapse as Ren, the Rook, Vargo, and Sedge fight to save the Wellspring. Ondrakja is eaten by zlyzen. Vargo closes the junction between the dream world and reality, leaving the Wellspring intact.

Indestor is executed by the Vraszenian clan leaders, and his family is stripped of their property and noble status. In exchange for his help against Indestor, Vargo is granted ennoblement. Ren learns that Vargo was behind Kolya Serrado's death. Her trust in Vargo broken, she informs the Rook. The Rook, revealed to be Grey Serrado, vows revenge.

== Major themes ==
Writing for the Los Angeles Review of Books, Matthew Iung believes that the novel explores the conflict between the elite and the disadvantaged, as well as issues including white supremacy and police brutality. The novel was written several months before the murder of George Floyd; Iung compared the novel's scenes of riots, urban unrest, and racial/class tension to the Black Lives Matter movement. Despite the fact that fantasy novels are often based on classical, medieval, and Renaissance settings, policing is a modern phenomenon. Iung writes that Carrick portrays the Vigil police force as a system which upholds "racial hierarchy and class hegemony in an imperial society". Additionally, Iung writes about the novel's treatment of water politics; a minor element involves Ren's desire to obtain a charter for a political ally to clean up water in the city's poorer areas. One month before the publication of the novel, Wall Street began trading water futures as a commodity for the first time, which Iung likens to "disaster capitalism". Additionally, the theme of exploitation of water is evidence by the villain's attempt to destroy a sacred wellspring. In this way, Carrick argues that water should be a shared and common resource.

== Reception ==
The novel received mostly positive critical reviews. Writing for Tor.com, Liz Bourke praised the detailed worldbuilding and layered magic system, calling the novel "engaging and entertaining". A review in the Los Angeles Review of Books praised the novel's treatment of complex social issues such as police brutality, urban unrest, and colonialism. A review for Culturess praised the novel's complex characterization and worldbuilding, noting that dedicated readers would be rewarded despite the novel's healthy page count. Publishers Weekly criticized the worldbuilding as "sometimes tediously complex" but praised the "tightly laced plot dripping with political intrigue".
