= The Liar's Knot =

2021 fantasy novel by M.A. Carrick

- Author: M.A. Carrick (Marie Brennan and Alyc Helms)
- Language: English
- Series: The Rook and Rose
- Release number: 2
- Genre: Fantasy
- Publisher: Orbit Books
- Pages: 688
- ISBN: 9780316539715
- Preceded by: The Mask of Mirrors
- Followed by: Labyrinth's Heart

Brennan and Helms at World Fantasy Convention 2026

The Liar's Knot is a 2021 fantasy novel written by M.A. Carrick. Carrick is a pseudonym for authors Marie Brennan and Alyc Helms, who wrote the novel jointly. It is middle novel in the Rook and Rose trilogy, set between the events of The Mask of Mirrors (2021) and Labyrinth's Heart (2023).

== Plot ==
After the death of Leato Traementis, Ren is officially adopted into the Traementis family under the name Renata Viraudax. Although she grows closer to Donaia and Giuna, the burden of her deception weighs heavily on her. To escape the confines of Renata’s role, she adopts a Vraszenian persona named Arenza Lenskaya. In this guise she becomes entangled with Grey Serrado, unaware at first that he is the Rook. Their relationship deepens, even as Ren risks exposure.

Ren’s alliance with Derossi Vargo grows strained after she discovers he had once betrayed her to Mettore Indestor. In her guise as Renata, she accepts an invitation from the astrologer Tanaquis Fienola to join the numinatrin mystery cult of the Illius Praeteri. Vargo also investigates this secret society. To conceal her actions, Ren creates another identity, the Black Rose. As the Rose, she works alongside Vargo while secretly distrusting him.

The Black Rose eventually becomes a tool for larger politics. The leaders of the Vraszenian clans recruit her to oppose the radical Stadmen Anduske faction. With Vargo’s help, Ren captures a key target, Dmastos Očelen. Vargo’s attempt to aid the ousted Anduske leader Koszar Andrejek goes wrong, leading to Andrejek’s imprisonment. A Praeteri ritual forces Renata to denounce Vargo publicly. Despite this, she (in her guise as the Black Rose) is forced to join forces with both Vargo and the Rook to break Andrejek out of prison.

At a ball celebrating Renata’s adoption into House Traementis, Vargo intercepts a letter that could expose her lies. He chooses not to read it, revealing his conflicted feelings. That same night, Grey is ambushed by Ghiscolo Acrenix, cursed, and nearly killed. Ren dons the Rook’s costume to protect him and brings him to Vargo, who recognizes the curse as the same that once killed his ally Alsius Acrenix. Vargo saves Grey from the curse, and Ren is forced to reveal her true identity to both men.

Ren learns that a medallion she once stole from Letilia is part of a set of artifacts once wielded by the tyrant Kaius Rex. These artifacts were designed to call upon the corrupting force of the Primordials, which are spirits that are linked to human emotions such as desire and fear. Tanaquis reveals that the full set, if reunited, could grant a wielder the same devastating power Rex once commanded. The Rook's goal is to destroy the medallions, and Grey Serrado has come closer than anyone wearing the mantle of the Rook in the past.

Ghiscolo Acrenix seeks to gather the medallions and use them to conquer the city. He attempts a ritual to take the Tyrant's power for himself. Ren, Grey, and Vargo manage to stop him. The spirit of the Rook is willing to allow Ghiscolo’s ritual to kill the medallion bearers if it means that the medallions will be destroyed. To save Ren, Grey resists and breaks from the Rook, severing his connection to the spirit and its powers. In the aftermath, Ren, Grey, and Vargo each remain bound to a medallion of their own. All three must now find a way to destroy them before the corrupt influence of the Primordials overtakes them.

== Reception and awards ==
Bill Capossere of fantasyliterature.com rated the novel 4.5 out of 5 stars. The review praised the complexity of the plot, writing that it avoids a common pitfall of storytelling which has "characters either not having conversations you know they would be having or else being far more oblivious than they are painted in any other aspect of the story." In contrast, The Liar's Knot avoids this shortfall by allowing the characters to speak to one another, revealing many secrets halfway through the book, and then allowing the back half of the novel to be driven by different plot threads. Capossere felt that the final act of the book, involving the mystery cult, was the weakest aspect of the plot. The review also felt that the secondary cast was underdeveloped in comparison to the main characters. Despite this, the review highly recommended the novel. A review in Grimdark Magazine stated that the defining concept for the novel would be summarized as "found family," particularly the relationships that the main characters share with one another. The review stated that in the parlance of the novel, a "knot" is a gang of thieves. Therefore, the title is both a description of the plot and a clever play on words that describes the central trio of Renata, Grey, and Vargo.

Publishers Weekly wrote that the novel had "plenty of lies to go around and unraveling them involves a dizzying secondary cast." The review felt that many of the characters were underdeveloped as a result of the complexity of the plot, but concluded that "fans of complicated puzzles and mystery will be satisfied."
