= Grossman Library =

Library at the Harvard Extension School

Coordinates: 42°22′27.8″N 71°6′55.7″W

- Location: Cambridge, Massachusetts, United States of America
- Type: University library
- Established: 1964
- Dissolved: 2018
- Branch of: Harvard University

Other information
- Website: Grossman Library

Grossman Library, located at its closure on the third floor of Sever Hall in Harvard Yard, was the Harvard Extension School's primary library. It is part of the Harvard College Library, the library system of Harvard's Faculty of Arts and Sciences. It was a reserve reading and study library, named in 1982 for alumnus and benefactor Edgar Grossman.

The library was established in 1964 in Lehman Hall, along with study spaces, conferences rooms, library facilities, and a dining hall for Extension students. In 1983–84, the library moved to Sever Hall and saw a doubling of usage to nearly 30,000 student visits, with 13,000 reserve books being circulated for in-library use.

It had on permanent display a number of works from the famed artist Allan Rohan Crite, including a collection of sketches, The Revelation of Saint John the Divine, and illustrations. Crite was a member of the class of 1968.

In 2018, the Extension School announced enhanced access for its students to the entire Harvard University library system, and closed Grossman Library, with its collections to be distributed among other libraries of the Faculty of Arts and Sciences.

== Works cited ==
- Shinagel, Michael (2010), The Gates Unbarred: A History of University Extension at Harvard, 1910–2009, Harvard University Press, ISBN 0674051351
