= The Rapture Effect =

The Rapture Effect is a novel by Jeffrey A. Carver published by Tor Books in 1987.

== Plot summary ==
The Rapture Effect is a novel in which an Earth fleet comes to the Argus system to colonize, while an alien society searches there to find its lost ancestors.

== Reception ==
J. Michael Caparula reviewed The Rapture Effect in Space Gamer/Fantasy Gamer No. 85. Caparula commented that "the author seems to have been trying to do too much, and sacrificed a good story in the process. A lot of dress-up ideas with nowhere to go."

Kirkus Reviews states "Solid storytelling, then, after some initial silliness, and plenty of narrative drive--especially where the aliens are concerned--despite the thin, implausible characters and a general air of ho-hum familiarity."

== Reviews ==
- Review by Dan Chow (1987) in Locus, #314 March 1987
- Review by Bob Howe (1987) in Fantasy Review, June 1987
- Review by Tom Easton (1987) in Analog Science Fiction/Science Fact, August 1987
- Review by Janice M. Eisen (1988) in Aboriginal Science Fiction, September-October 1988
- Review by Ken Brown (1988) in Interzone, #26 November-December 1988
