= List of science fiction publishers =

This is a list of science fiction and fantasy publishers, publishers of science fiction, SF studies, speculative fiction, fantasy literature, and related genres.

== A ==
- Ace Books
- Advent:Publishers
- Alfred A. Knopf
- Allen & Unwin
- Amulet Books
- Analog Science Fiction and Fact
- Android Press
- Angry Robot
- Atheneum Books
- Aqueduct Press
- Arbor House
- Arcadia House
- Arkham House
- Arno Press
- Arrow
- Arthur A. Levine Books
- Asimov's Science Fiction
- At Bay Press
- Avon
- Avon Eos

== B ==
- Badger Books
- Baen Books
- Ballantine Books
- Bantam Books
- Bantam Dell
- Bantam Spectra
- Berkley Books
- Berkeley Publishing Group
- Big Little Books
- Bison Books
- Bloomsbury Publishing
- Bluejay Books
- Borgo Press

== C ==
- Canaveral Press
- Candlewick Press
- Canongate Books
- Carcosa
- Carroll & Graf Publishers
- Chatto & Windus
- Cheap Street Press
- Chimaera Publications
- Crown Publishers

== D ==
- DAW Books
- Del Rey Books
- Delacorte Press
- Donald M. Grant, Publisher
- Double Dragon Publishing
- Doubleday
- Dragon Moon Press
- Dutton

== E ==
- Easton Press
- EDGE Science Fiction and Fantasy Publishing
- Eidolon Publications
- Elder Signs Press
- Eos Books
- Erewhon Books

== F ==
- Faber & Faber
- Fantasy Press
- Fantasy Publishing Company, Inc.
- Farrar, Straus and Giroux
- Fedogan & Bremer
- Flame Tree Publishing
- Forge Books
- 47North

== G ==
- G. P. Putnam's Sons
- Galaxy Science Fiction
- Gnome Press
- Golden Gryphon Press
- Gollancz Books
- Grafton
- The Grandon Company
- Grant-Hadley Enterprises
- Greenberg
- Greenwillow
- Greenwood Press
- Gregg Press
- Grove Press

== H ==
- Hachette Australia
- Hadley Publishing Company
- Harcourt, Brace & World
- Harcourt Brace Jovanovich
- Harcourt, Inc.
- Harper & Row
- Harper Prism
- Harper Torch
- HarperCollins
- HarperCollins/Voyager
- Head of Zeus
- Headline Publishing Group
- Henry Holt and Company
- Hodder & Stoughton
- Holt, Rinehart & Winston
- Houghton Mifflin
- Hyperion Press

== I ==
- Ink Smith Publishing
- ISFiC Press

== J ==
- Jo Fletcher Books
- Jonathan Cape
- Jurassic London

== K ==
- Kayelle Press
- Kurodahan Press

== L ==
- Laser Books
- Legend Books
- Leisure Books
- Lethe Press
- Little, Brown and Company

== M ==
- Mark V. Ziesing
- Macmillan Publishers
- Macmillan UK
- Meisha Merlin Publishing
- Millennium Books
- Mirage Press
- Mirror Word Publishing
- Mojo Press
- Mulholland Books

== N ==
- Necronomicon Press
- Necropolitan Press
- NESFA Press
- New English Library
- Newcastle Publishing Company
- NewCon Press
- Night Shade Books
- Nightfire
- Norilana Books
- Norstrilia Press

== O ==
- Obverse Books
- Orb Books
- Orb Publications
- Orbit Books
- Orion Books

== P ==
- Pan Macmillan
- Pantheon Books
- Penguin Australia
- Penguin Books
- Phantasia Press
- Picador
- Pocket Books
- Prime Books
- Prime Press
- PS Publishing
- Pulphouse Publishing
- Pyr
- Pyramid Books

== R ==
- Random House
- Razorbill
- Redhook Books

== S ==
- Saga Press
- Scribner
- Scholastic
- Science Fiction Book Club
- Science Fiction Research Association
- Shasta Publishers
- Signet
- Sigwick & Jackson
- Simon & Schuster
- Simon & Schuster UK
- Small Beer Press
- Solaris Books
- Sphere Books
- St. Martin's Griffin
- St. Martin's Press
- Subterranean Press

== T ==
- Tachyon Publications
- Tartarus Press
- TCK Publishing
- Tell-Tale Publishing
- Ticonderoga Publications
- Titan Books
- Timescape Books
- Tor Books
- Tor Teen
- Tor UK

== U ==
- Underwood-Miller

== V ==
- Victor Gollancz Ltd
- Viking Canada
- Viking Press
- Vintage

== W ==
- Walker Books
- Warner Aspect
- Warner Books
- Wheatland Press
- Wildside Press
- William Morrow and Company
- Winston Science Fiction
- The Women's Press
