= Harvard–Radcliffe Science Fiction Association =

The Harvard–Radcliffe Science Fiction Association (HRSFA) is the undergraduate science fiction association at Harvard University. Founded in 1986, its purpose is to promote science fiction (and fantasy) and aid in activity of those interested in the genre. HRSFA also co-sponsors the annual Ig Nobel awards and organizes Vericon, an annual science fiction convention; and it intermittently publishes Fusion, a speculative-fiction literary magazine. Other events held by HRSFA include the Wyld Hunt, Going of the Hour, and Masquerade Ball. It is sometimes cited as an example of a social organization whose parties and events do not focus upon drinking, and has gained attention for this role as Harvard tries to move towards greater social opportunities for its students. Its alumni network, HRSFANS, organizes reunion events and provides grants to enable undergraduate members to accept internships in the speculative fiction publishing industry.

== Notable alumni ==
- Nate Ackerman, 2004 Olympic wrestler
- Darcy Burner, executive director of the American Progressive Caucus Policy Foundation
- Michael A. Burstein, Campbell Award–winning science fiction writer
- Marie Brennan, fantasy novelist
- Ada Palmer, historian and novelist
