= The Sand Castle (1977 film) =

- Directed by: Co Hoedeman
- Produced by: Co Hoedeman; Gaston Sarault; Pierre Moretti (exec.)
- Cinematography: Jean-Yves Escoffier
- Edited by: Jacques Drouin
- Music by: Normand Roger
- Distributed by: National Film Board of Canada
- Release date: June 1, 1977
- Running time: 13 minutes
- Country: Canada
- Language: None
- Budget: $82,783 (equivalent to $387,060 in 2023).

The Sand Castle (Le château de sable) is a 1977 stop motion animated short created by Co Hoedeman for the National Film Board of Canada. It won the Academy Award for Best Animated Short Film at the 50th Academy Awards.

== Synopsis ==
The plot of the film follows a humanoid sand person who creates living creatures from sand in a desert. He then initiates a plan: that they create a sand castle to live in. When they've completed the castle, they celebrate but the celebration is cut short when wind begins to blow and covers up the castle. The sand characters retreat into the castle for safety. The rest is left open to interpretation; viewers may assume that the characters are subsumed, or that they eventually resurface and start over again in an endless cycle.

== Themes ==
The theme of The Sand Castle, according to Hoedeman, is "man versus nature...one can't outdo the other. We have to live side by side and make the best of it."

In 2015, the Canadian filmmaker Dylan Akio Smith wrote: "Thematically, there is a sense of fun and magic as we watch these little sand figures come out of the ground and interact with each other. The somewhat Canadian themes of diversity and working together in harmony for the greater good is also present. You can feel the wonder the director has for life itself, but there is also a wistfulness present for the fragility of existence. We come from dust and to dust we shall return. It's a beautiful film and one of my favourites of all time, Canadian or otherwise."

== Production ==
The film was created with sand animation and sand-covered foam rubber puppets–three-dimensional puppet animation was Hoedeman's specialty and, at the time, there were only three or four Canadian filmmakers using the technique. Three boxes of sand were used, with the characters created to fit the smooth, edge-free landscape, and the sand's various textures and colours.

== Awards ==
- Annecy International Animation Film Festival, Grand Prix, 1977
- 50th Academy Awards: Academy Award for Best Animated Short Film, 1978
- British Academy Film Awards: Nominee: BAFTA Award for Best Fictional Film, 1978
- ALA Notable Children's Videos, 1977.

== Works cited ==
- Evans, Gary (1991). In the National Interest: A Chronicle of the National Film Board of Canada from 1949 to 1989. University of Toronto Press. ISBN 0802027849.
