= Allan Crite =

African-American painter (1910–2007)

Allan Rohan Crite
- Born: March 20, 1910; North Plainfield, New Jersey, United States
- Died: September 6, 2007 (aged 97); Boston, Massachusetts, United States
- Education: School of the Museum of Fine Arts, Harvard University (ALB)
- Known for: Oils, prints; drafting; author, publisher, and librarian
- Awards: Harvard University Anniversary Medal

Allan Rohan Crite (March 20, 1910 – September 6, 2007) was a Boston-based African American artist. He won several honors, such as the 350th Harvard University Anniversary Medal.

== Biography ==
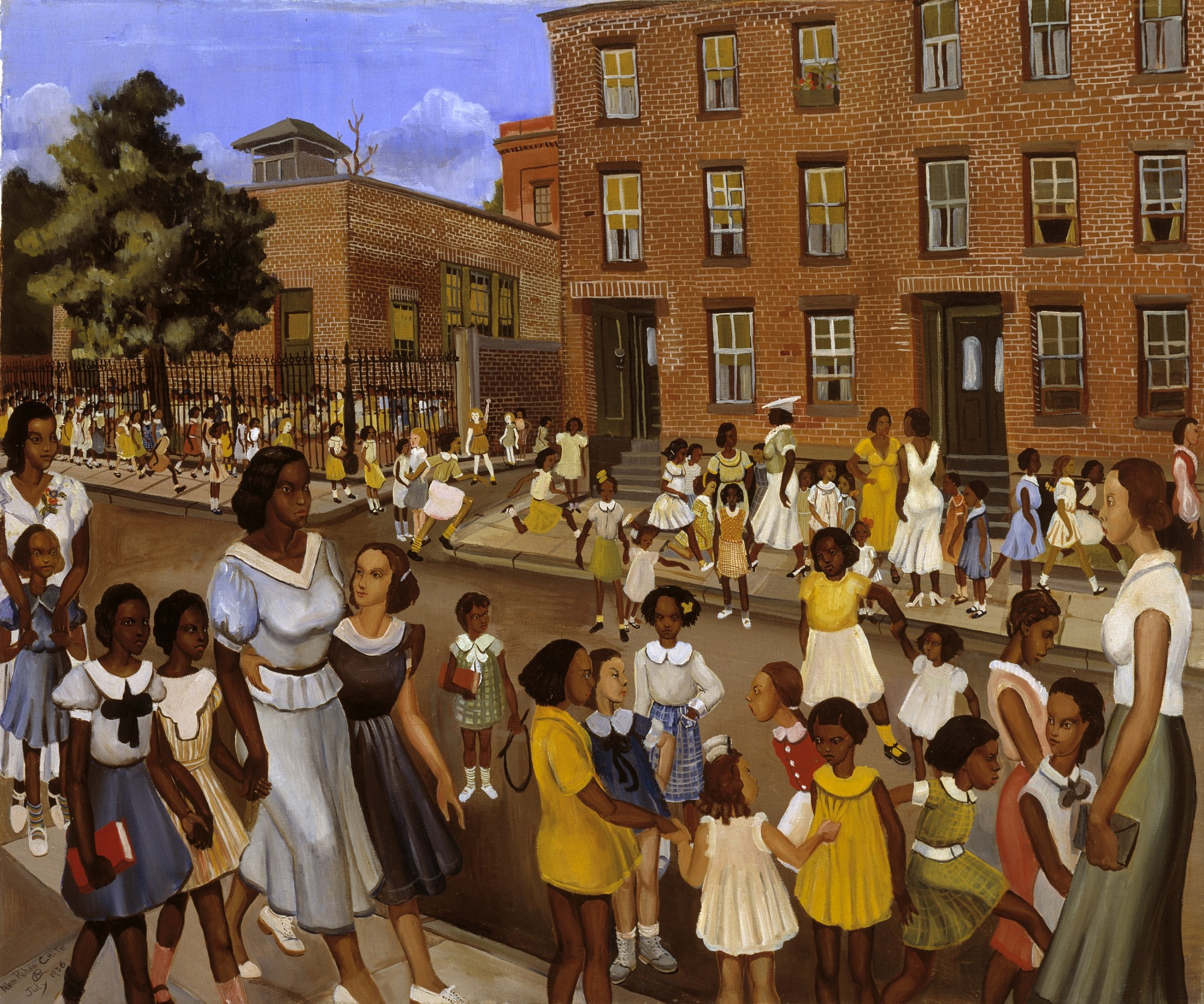
Allan Crite, School's Out (1936), Federal Art Project

Crite was born in North Plainfield, New Jersey, on March 20, 1910. The family relocated to Massachusetts and from the age of one until his death Crite lived in Boston's South End. Crite's mother, Annamae, was a poet who encouraged her son to draw. Showing promise at a young age, he enrolled in the Children's Art Centre at United South End Settlements in Boston and graduated from the English High School in 1929. His father, Oscar William Crite, was a doctor and engineer, one of the first Black people to earn an engineering license.

Though he was admitted to the Yale School of Art, he chose to attend the School of the Museum of Fine Arts in Boston and graduated in 1936. He was a draughtsman and illustrator in the Design Department of the Charlestown Navy Yard from 1941 until 1974.

Recognition came early as well. His work was first shown at New York's Museum of Modern Art in 1936 and his first solo show at the Boston Athaneaum in 1948. The Athenaeum and the Isabella Stewart Gardner Museum mounted concurrent exhibitions of Crite's work in 2025.

Crite then attended Harvard Extension School, where he earned an ALB degree in 1968.

Crite was among the few African-Americans employed by the Federal Art Project. In 1940, he took a job as an engineering draftsman with the Boston Naval Shipyard where he worked as an artist for 30 years. After, he worked part time as a librarian at Harvard University's Grossman Library. For many decades, he was a mentor and elder to burgeoning Black artists in the Boston area, including Napoleon Jones-Henderson, Johnetta Tinker, Susan Thompson, and Aukrum Burton who formed the Boston Collective in the 1970s and 1980s.

In 1986, Boston named the intersection of Columbus Avenue and West Canton Street, steps from his home, Allan Rohan Crite Square.

In 1993, Crite married Jackie Cox-Crite. Together they established the Crite House Museum in their home at 410 Columbus Avenue in Boston's South End.

Suffolk University awarded him an honorary doctorate in 1979.

He died in his sleep of natural causes on September 6, 2007, at age 97.

His widow established the Allan Rohan Crite Research Institute to safeguard his legacy, which Crite never thought important, by authenticating and cataloging his many scattered works.

== Artwork ==
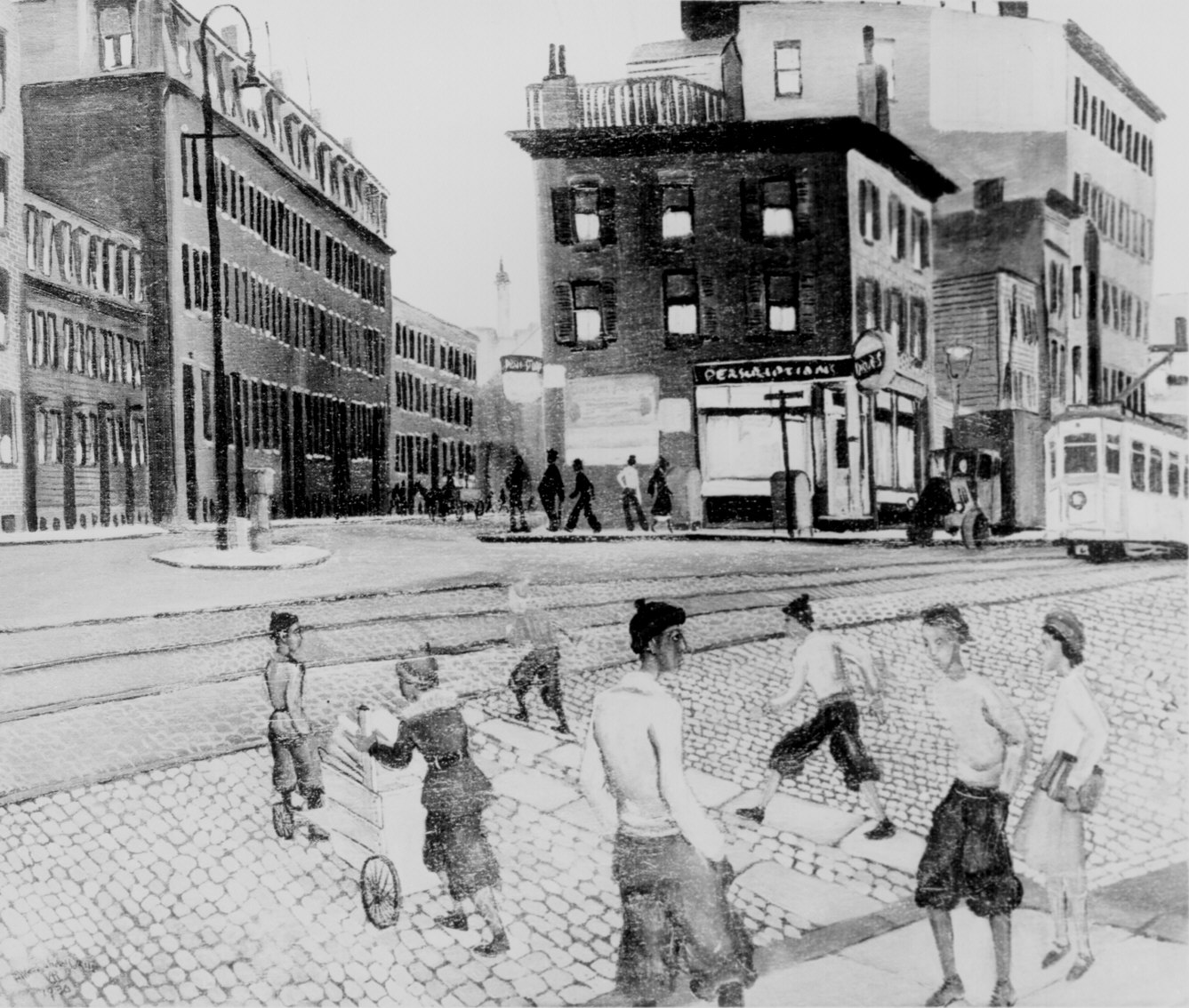
Douglass Square, Boston, by Allan Crite. Oil. 20" x 24". 1936, Federal Art Project

Crite hoped to depict the life of African-Americans living in Boston in a new and different way: as ordinary citizens or the "middle class" rather than stereotypical representations as jazz musicians or sharecroppers. Through his art, he intended to tell the story of African Americans as part of the fabric of American society and its reality. By using representational style rather than modernism, Crite felt that he could more adequately "report" and capture the reality that African Americans were part of but often unaccounted for.

Crite explained his body of work as having a common theme:

I've only done one piece of work in my whole life and I am still at it. I wanted to paint people of color as normal humans. I tell the story of man through the black figure.

His paintings fall into two categories: religious themes and general African-American experiences, with some reviewers adding a third category for work depicting Negro spirituals. Spirituals, he believed, expressed a certain humanity. Crite was a devout Episcopalian, and his religion inspired many of his works. His 1946 painting Madonna of the Subway is an example of a blend of genres, depicting a Black Holy Mother and baby Jesus riding Boston's Orange Line. Other pieces such as School's Out (1936) reflect on the themes of community, family, society. On his faith and the role of liturgy in his pieces, Crite said in an interview:

It was very useful, because it gave me a framework of discipline within which to do my work. So I used that, for example, as the frame of discipline to illustrate the spirituals, by making use of the liturgy, the vestments, and everything like that – using the vestments and appurtenances as, you might say, a vocabulary.

His work is recognizable in its use of rich earth tone colors. According to one biographer, his favorite color was "all colors" and his favorite time of year was "anything but winter." According to one reviewer, "Crite's oils and graphics, even when restricted to black and white, are bright in tonality, fine and varied in line, extremely rhythmic, dramatic in movement, and often patterned."

Crite's works hang in more than a hundred American institutions, including the Museum of Modern Art in New York, the Art Institute of Chicago and Washington’s Phillips Collection. The Boston Athenaeum holds the largest public collection of his paintings and watercolors, a bequest from Crite in gratitude for his long tenure there as a visiting artist.

== Books ==
Crite's illustrated books include:

- Were You There When They Crucified My Lord. A Negro Spiritual in Illustrations (Cambridge, Massachusetts: Harvard University Press, 1944)
- All Glory: Brush Drawing Meditations On The Prayer Of Consecration (Cambridge, Massachusetts: Society of Saint John the Evangelist, 1947)
- Is It Nothing to You? (1948), (Boston, Massachusetts: Episcopal Diocese of Massachusetts)
- Three Spirituals from Earth to Heaven (1948), in which he illustrated religious stories from such African-American spirituals as "Swing Low Sweet Chariot" and "Nobody Knows the Trouble I've Seen"

== Exhibitions ==
Crite's major exhibitions included:

- 1920s Harmon Foundation Exhibitions
- 1930s Museum of Modern Art, New York
- 1936 Corcoran Gallery of Art, Washington, D.C.
- 1939 Boston Museum of Fine Arts
- 1978 Boston Athenaeum
- 1999 Frye Art Museum, Seattle
- 2025 Boston Athenæum
- 2025 Isabella Stewart Gardner Museum

His works were shown in a coordinated series of posthumous exhibitions in 2007–08, at the Boston Public Library, the Boston Athenaeum, and the Museum of the National Center of Afro-American Artists.
