= Akenesie Novalinga =

Canadian Inuk artist and musician (1910–1987)

- Akalisie Novalinga performing in the Native Peoples Area at the Mariposa Folk Festival 1977
- Born: 1910
- Died: 1987 (aged 76–77)
- Other name: Akalisie Novalinga
- Occupations: Textile artist, printmaker, singer
- Spouse: Johnny Pov

Akenesie Novalinga or Akalisie Novalinga (1910–1987) was a Inuk textile artist, printmaker, and throat singer from Nunavik, Quebec.

== Biography ==
Novalinga was born in 1910. She married Johnny Pov, a Inuk guide and community leader in Puvirnituq, an Inuit Northern village in Nunavik, Quebec. After the success of the Cape Dorset (Kinngait) print shop, Novalinga and Pov became early members of the Povungnituk Cooperative when it opened in 1961.

The couple had both taken up printmaking at the same time but after his death in 1978, Novalinga would continue and drew inspiration from her life (what she knew or had seen) with her drawings often then made into prints.

Some Inuit communities continued building kajait (the plural of kajak, translated from Inuit language as kayak) with traditional materials and methods up until the 1960s. One of those communities was Puvirnituq and, in 1959, Akenesie Novalinga and her husband were photographed building a kajak by Hudson's Bay Company photographer Frederica Knight. Knight captured the whole process on film, and her images can be found today in the Hudson's Bay Company Archives in Winnipeg.

Novalinga was also known for making traditional Inuit garments. In 1975, she was involved in providing music and dialogue for a short film by the National Film Board of Canada based on the Inuit legend of Lumaaq, also known as The Blind Man and the Loon.

"Lumaaq tells the story of a legend widely believed by the Povungnituk Inuit. The artist's drawings are transferred to paper, cut out, and animated under the camera. The result is Inuit prints in action. Dialogue, music and artwork make this film a total cultural transplant."

== Exhibition history ==
Some pieces of her work are owned by the Bibliothèque et Archives nationales du Québec.

Her work has been shown in the United States in exhibitions in San Francisco and Seattle and also been included in multiple Povungnituk Annual Print Collections.
