= Doppelganger (Brennan novel) =

2006 novel by Marie Brennan

- Author: Marie Brennan
- Cover artist: Don Puckey and Steve Stone
- Language: English
- Genre: High fantasy
- Publisher: Warner Books
- Publication date: 2006
- Publication place: United States
- Media type: Print (paperback)
- Pages: 422 pp. (paperback edition)
- ISBN: 0-446-61698-2 (paperback edition)
- OCLC: 64694864
- LC Class: CPB Box no. 2442 vol. 7
- Followed by: Witch

Doppelganger is a high fantasy novel written by Marie Brennan published in 2006. It chronicles the adventures of Miryo, a witch, and Mirage, her doppelgänger.

== Premise ==
Mirage is a witty bounty hunter who always gets her mark. But her new mission, which involves working with witches, might mark her downfall. She habitually tries to distance herself from witches, whose magic she might not be able to match with her strength.

Miryo is a witch who just barely passed her initiation test. To control her powers and become a full witch, she must find her doppelganger, Mirage, and kill her.

== Plot summary ==
The book opens on a scene where Mirage, a Hunter (individuals who specialize as assassins, bodyguards and spies), is hiding and preparing to strike three men who mistake her for a witch at first, then for a Cousin (witch's assistant). Mirage, being a great Hunter trained from Silverfire, gets her mark and almost kills the three men.

The scene cuts to Eclipse, Mirage's schoolmate at Silverfire, one of the many Hunter schools, walking through Chervie's streets amidst a festival. He goes to a bar and meets Mirage, whom he calls Seniade. Mirage recognizes him and calls him Kerestel. Eclipse teases Mirage and they talk and catch up with each other until Ice arrives, a Hunter from Thornblood, a school Silverfire is not friendly with.

Ice flirts briefly with Eclipse but is stopped by Mirage. A hostile conversation takes place and only stops when Mirage learns she was chosen for a commission.

Mirage pays for a private room, which is hard to find and expensive since the festival is taking place. She and Eclipse search the room for any possible places where eavesdroppers might hide and, finding none, start talking.

Mirage is taken aback and has second thoughts when she learns it concerns the assassination of a witch and generally the witch community, which she avoids concerning herself with since she is always mistaken for a witch due to her red hair. But she reluctantly accepts the commission.

They travel to Corbeth to meet their employer. Upon arriving there, they learn they need to take a blood oath, which means they either do the job or die. They are prepped by a witch and after discussing it, decides to go to Starfall to investigate Tari-nakana's house

Meanwhile, Miryo is introduced in the story sitting on a roof. She is mulling over her future as a witch and what will happen if she fails the test to become one. She is joined by her friend Eikyo who reassures her she will succeed. Miryo remains nervous, recalling a student who died during her own test.

Eikyo helps Miryo decide what Path she will be in and without much conclusive results, Miryo goes back to her room to start a homework.

The next scene is featured in the library, where Miryo talks with an Air Head, Narika-kai. Narika-kai notices that Miryo is jumpy that day and correctly assumes Miryo is studying and also says every witch studies herself exhausted when her trials approaches.

== Characters ==
=== Witches ===
The inhabitants of Starfall, the southernmost region. They practice magic and have a simple hierarchy. Each ray of magic, based on five elements, is led by a prime, with the Void Prime leading all the rays. Each ray of magic is made up of that prime and the heads, hands and hearts (who deal with research, action, and internal affairs of the ray).

=== Cousins ===
Cousins are helpers to the witches. They seem to have their own hierarchy. Not much is known about them except that they serve the witches.

== See also ==
- Triquetra
