= Blind Man and the Loon =

Folk tale

The Blind Man (or Boy) and the Loon, also commonly known as the Lumaaq Story (also spelled Lumiuk or Lumak), among other names, is a folktale told all over Greenland, Canada, and down into parts of the United States, though most heavily retold by Inuit and Athabaskan speakers.

== Story ==
A blind boy lives with an abusive female guardian, either a mother, grandmother, or stepmother. He also has a sister. One day a polar bear arrives in their camp. Through the window of their house, the blind boy shoots the bear. His guardian lies, telling him he missed and then keeps the bear's meat for herself and the sister. The sister brings meat to the boy in secret.

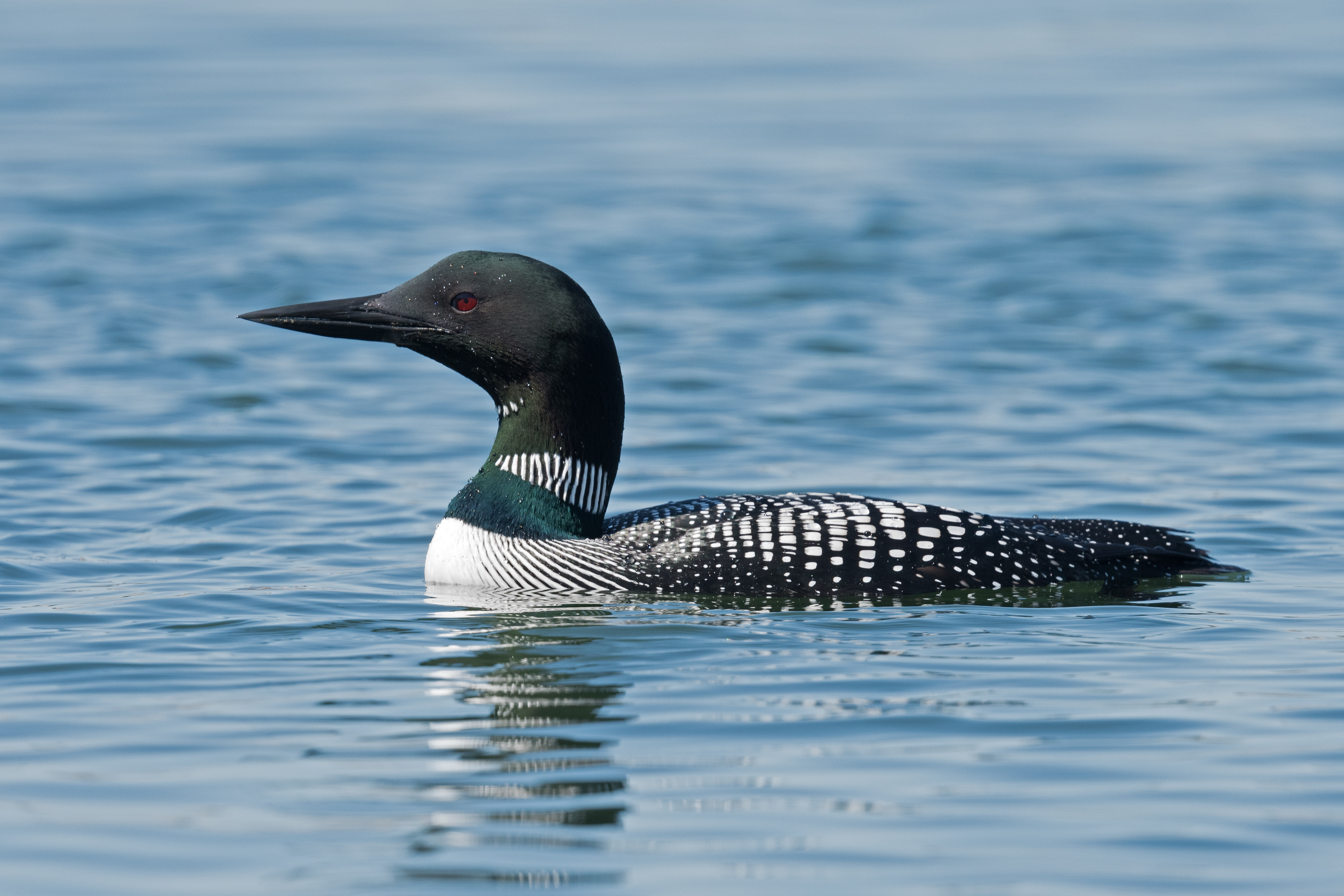
A common loon

The boy goes to a lake, where he is brought underwater by a loon. The loon brings him underwater and surfaces several times. Each time they surface the boy can see a little more. By the end his sight is entirely restored.

Now that he can see, the boy takes part in a beluga whale hunt at the beach. His guardian comes hunting too, serving as the anchor for the harpoon line. A rope is tied around her waist, and her job is to pull back and brace against the whale. She is pulled out to sea by the whale, either because the boy did not help her pull back, or because he deliberately harpooned a whale that was too large. The large whale pulls her into the water, and she is lost. In some versions she becomes a narwhal, her hair becoming the horn.

== Variants ==
Sun and Moon is an extended Inuit version of the story, adding several later events, and it ends with the brother and sister becoming the sun and the moon.

== Visual art ==
The story is a popular subject in Inuit art.

=== Prints ===
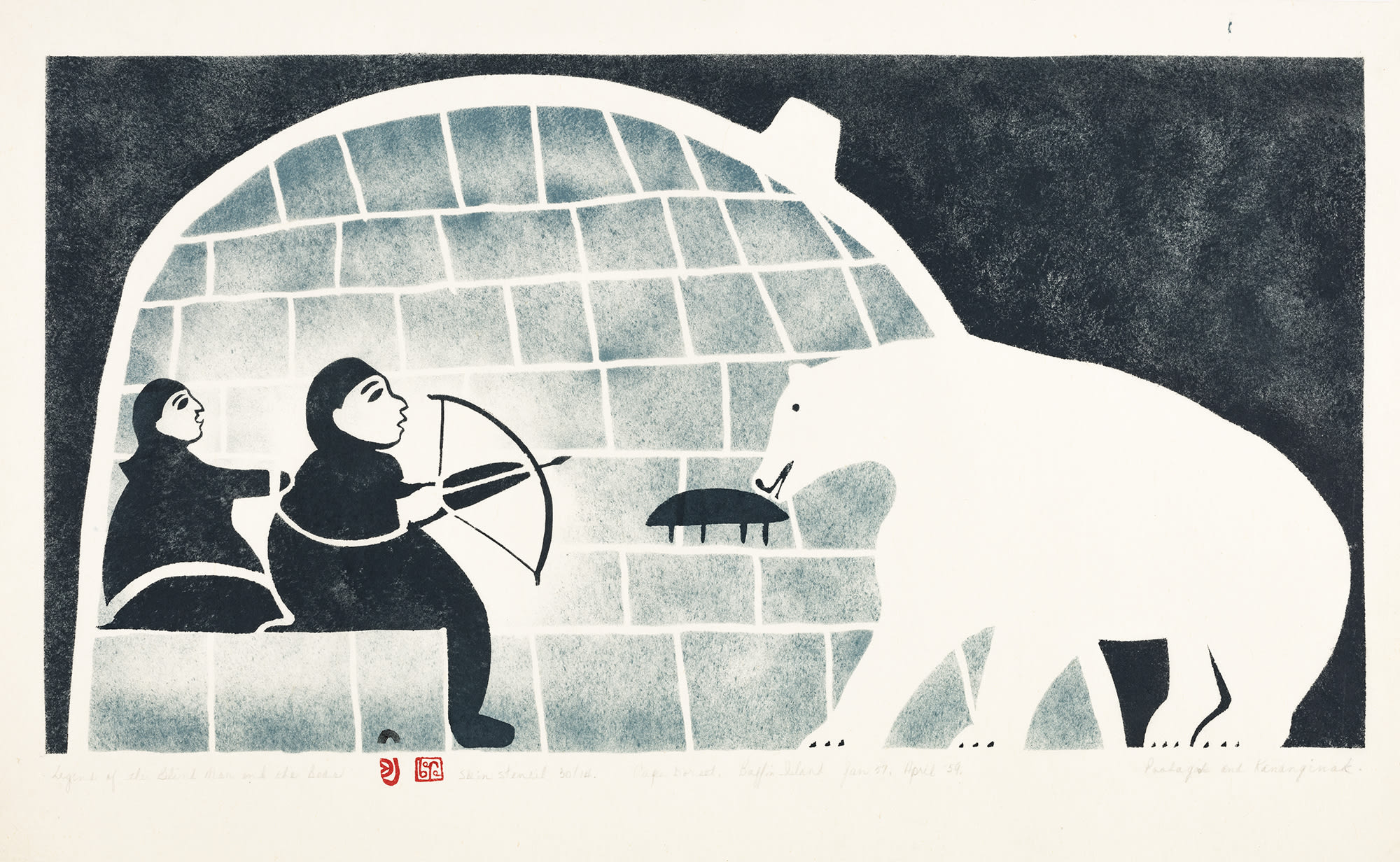
Josephie Pootoogook with Kananginak Pootoogook (1959). Legend of the Blind Man and the Bear. Cape Dorset.

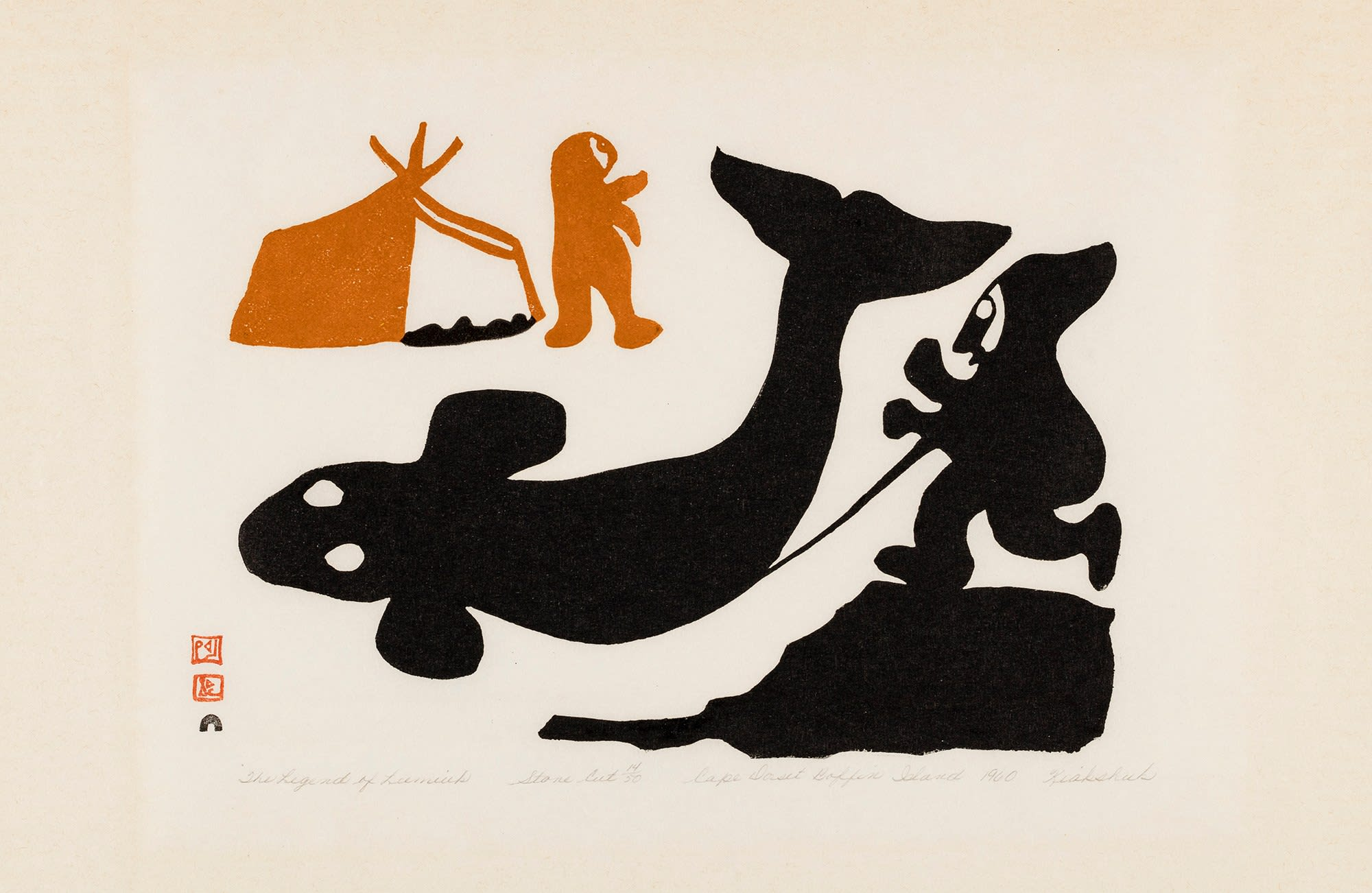
Kiakshuk (1960). The Legend of Lumiuk. Cape Dorset.

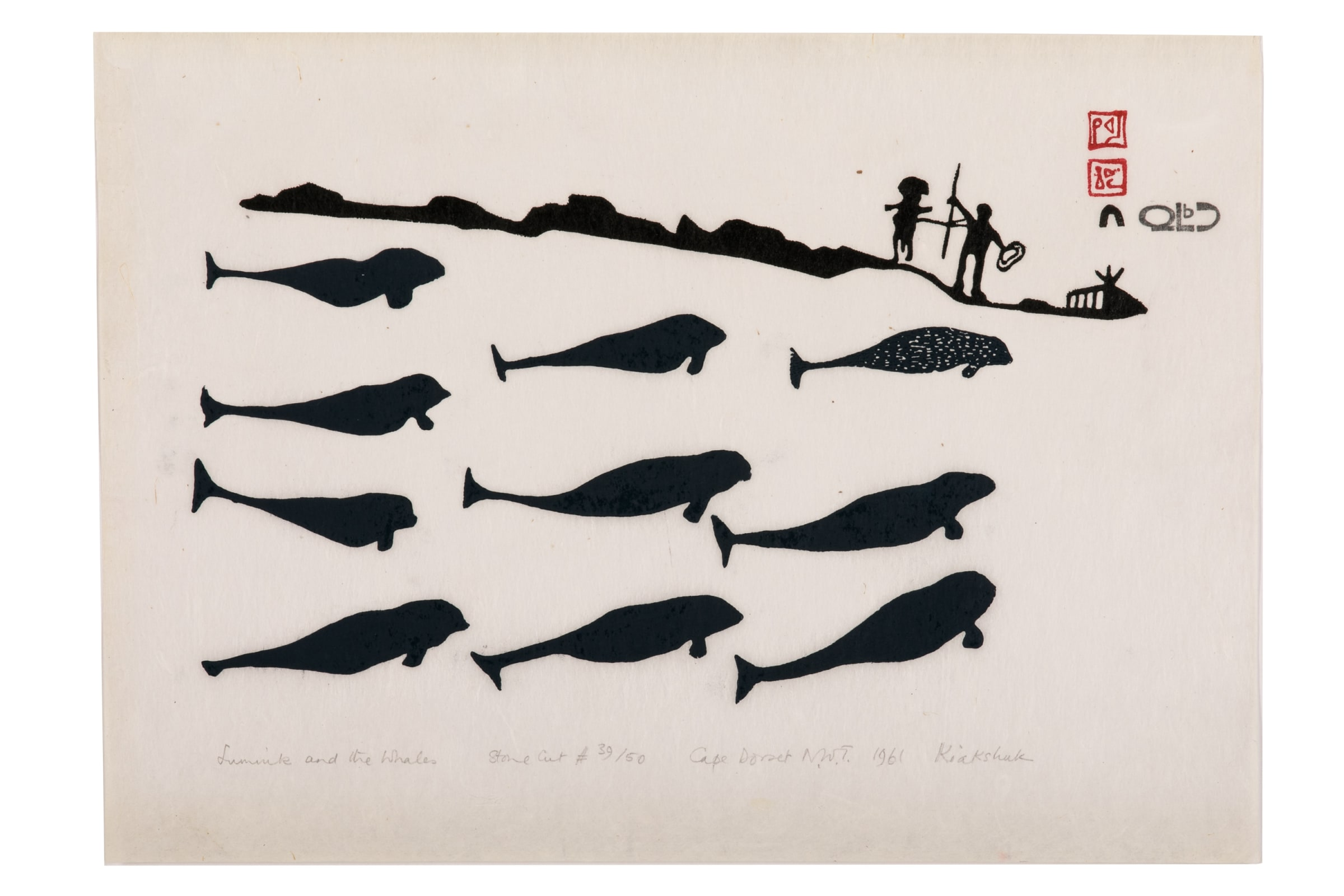
Kiakshuk (1961). Lumiuk and the Whales. Cape Dorset.
- Davidialuk Alasua Amittu (1962). Lumak (stonecut). Puvirnituq.
- Davidialuk Alasua Amittu (1963). Legend of Lumak (stonecut). Puvirnituq.
- Pitseolak Ashoona (1968). Legend of the Narwhal (stonecut). Cape Dorset.
- Agnes Nanogak (1975). Blind Boy (stonecut). Holman Island.

=== Figurines ===
- In the 1960s, Puvirnituq artist Aisa Qupiqrualuk carved a collection of 5 soapstone figurines depicting various scenes in the story.

== Screen adaptations ==
- The Loon's Necklace is a 1948 Canadian film, drawing from a Tsimshian version of the story.
- Lumaaq is a 1975 animated short film by Co Hoedeman, drawing from a Povungnituk version of the tale, with narration and music by Akinisie Novalinga.
- Lumaajuuq is a 2010 animated, short film by Alethea Arnaquq-Baril.
