= Ludovic: The Snow Gift =

1999 film by Co Hoedeman

- Directed by: Co Hoedeman
- Written by: Co Hoedeman; Marie-Francine Hébert
- Produced by: Thérèse Descary
- Narrated by: Sonja Ball
- Cinematography: Co Hoedeman
- Edited by: José Heppell
- Music by: Daniel Lavoie
- Production company: National Film Board of Canada
- Release date: 1998
- Running time: 14 minutes
- Country: Canada
- Language: English

Ludovic: The Snow Gift is a Canadian animated short film, directed by Co Hoedeman and released in 1998. The film centres on Ludovic, a baby teddy bear who finds solace in a dancing and singing doll, after his father forbids him from going tobogganing because he's too little. Inspired by Hoedeman's own childhood teddy bear, the film was animated primarily through stop motion animation of puppets.

After premiering in 1998, the film was screened in 1999 as the opening film to theatrical screenings of Babar: King of the Elephants.

The film received a Genie Award nomination for Best Animated Short Film at the 20th Genie Awards.

Several sequel films, Ludovic: A Crocodile in My Garden (2000), Ludovic: Visiting Grandpa (2001) and Ludovic: Magic in the Air (2002), were released over the next number of years.
