= Jeffrey Carver =

American novelist (1949–2026)

Jeffrey A. Carver
- Born: August 25, 1949; Cleveland, Ohio, U.S.
- Died: February 6, 2026 (aged 76)
- Education: Brown University
- Occupation: Novelist
- Writing career
- Period: 1970s–20??
- Genre: Science fiction
- Notable works: Eternity's End, Chaos Chronicles
- Website: www.starrigger.net

Jeffrey A. Carver (August 25, 1949 – February 6, 2026) was an American science fiction author. He was born in Cleveland, graduated from Brown University, and lived outside of Boston, Massachusetts with his family. His 2000 novel Eternity's End was a nominee at the 2001 Nebula Awards; in 2022 he was honored with the Helicon Lifetime Achievement Award.

In 1995, Carver developed and hosted the educational television series Science Fiction and Fantasy Writing, which has since been made available online.

Carver died on February 6, 2026, at the age of 76.

== Bibliography ==
=== The Chaos Chronicles ===
1. Neptune Crossing (1994), ISBN 0-8125-3515-4
2. Strange Attractors (1995), ISBN 0-8125-3516-2
3. The Infinite Sea (1996), ISBN 0-8125-3517-0
4. Sunborn (2008), ISBN 0-312-86453-1
5. The Reefs of Time (2019)
6. Crucible of Time (2019)

=== Star Rigger universe ===
- Seas of Ernathe (1976), ISBN 0-373-72034-3
- Star Rigger's Way (1978, revised edition 1994), ISBN 0-8125-3444-1
- Panglor (1980, revised edition 1996), ISBN 0-8125-3446-8
- Dragons in the Stars (1992), ISBN 0-8125-3303-8
- Dragon Rigger (1993), ISBN 0-8125-3323-2
- Eternity's End (2000), ISBN 0-312-85642-3

=== Starstream series ===
1. From a Changeling Star (1989), ISBN 978-0759295957
2. Down the Stream of Stars (1990), ISBN 978-0553283020

=== Other novels ===
- The Infinity Link (1984)
- The Rapture Effect (1987)
- Roger Zelazny's Alien Speedway: Clypsis (1987)
- Battlestar Galactica (novelization of the 2003 miniseries) (2006), ISBN 0-7653-5516-7

=== Short fiction ===
- "Of No Return" (1974)
- "Though All the Mountains Lie Between" (1980)
- "Reality and Other Fictions" (2012)
- "Going Alien" (2012)
