= Robert V.S. Redick =

American novelist

Robert von Stein Redick
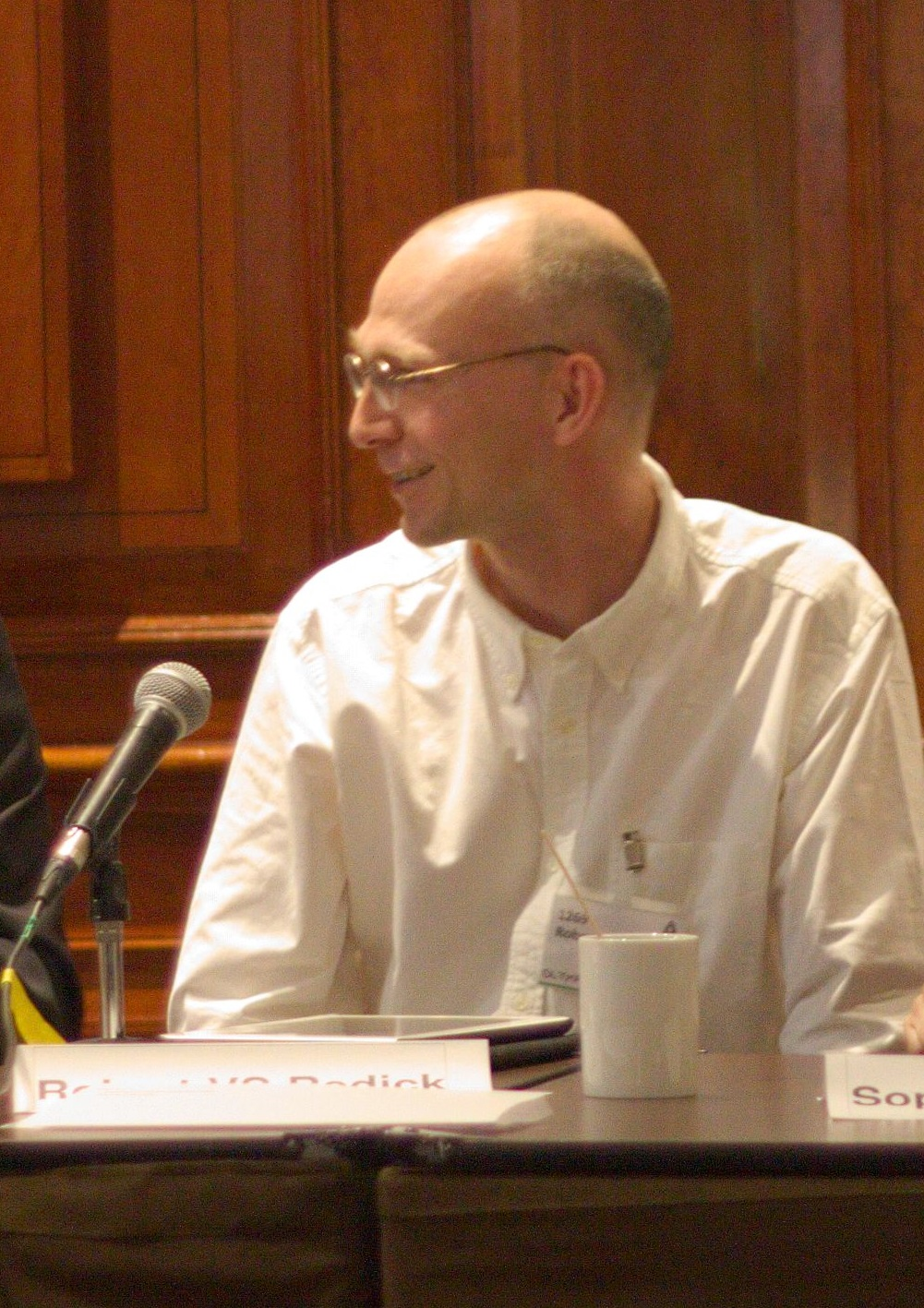
- at Eastercon 2012
- Born: December 4, 1967 (age 58)
- Occupation: Writer
- Writing career
- Language: English
- Subject: Fantasy

Robert von Stein Redick (born December 4, 1967) is an American author of epic fantasy and mainstream fiction. He was born on December 4, 1967, in Charlottesville, Virginia and grew up in Virginia, and Iowa City, Iowa. He attended the University of Virginia, where he studied English and Russian and went to graduate school at the University of Florida, where he earned a Master's in Tropical Conservation and Development.

Robert has lived and worked in Indonesia, Colombia, Argentina, the United Kingdom and France. In addition to his own writing, he works as a freelance editor and international development consultant. He lives with his partner Kiran Asher in Western Massachusetts.

== Bibliography ==
=== Novels ===
==== The Fire Sacraments Trilogy ====
- Master Assassins (March 6, 2018)
- Sidewinders (July 6, 2021)
- Date and title of Book III to be announced

==== The Chathrand Voyage Quartet ====
- The Red Wolf Conspiracy (2008)
- The Ruling Sea (2009)
- The River of Shadows (2011)
- The Night of the Swarm (2013)

==== Other novels ====
- Conquistadors (unpublished)

=== Short stories ===
- “Forever People” in Fearsome Journeys: The New Solaris Book of Fantasy (2013, edited by Jonathan Strahan)
- “Nocturne” in Unfettered: New Tales By Masters of Fantasy (2013, edited by Shawn Speakman)
