= The Red Wolf Conspiracy =

2008 novel by Robert V.S. Redick

- First edition (UK)
- Author: Robert V.S. Redick
- Cover artist: Edward Miller
- Language: English
- Series: The Chathrand Voyage
- Genre: Fantasy
- Publisher: Del Rey Books (U.S.) and Gollancz (UK)
- Publication date: February 1, 2008
- Publication place: United States
- Media type: Print (Hardback & Paperback)
- Pages: 462 pp (UK trade paperback edition)
- ISBN: 978-0-575-08177-2 (UK trade paperback edition)
- OCLC: 233261517
- Followed by: The Rats and the Ruling Sea

The Red Wolf Conspiracy is the first book of The Chathrand Voyage fantasy series written by American author Robert V.S. Redick. It was published by Gollancz Books in Britain and Canada in February 2008, and by Del Rey Books in the United States in 2009. The book has been translated into French, German, Polish and Spanish; Russian and Czech translations are forthcoming.

== Plot summary ==
The novel begins with a special notice from the Etherhorde Mariner, announcing that the IMS Chathrand has mysteriously vanished at sea on a voyage to transport Thasha Isiq to a political wedding to bring peace to the two competing empires of northwest Alifros.

Pazel Pathkendel is a young tarboy who is stranded in Etherhorde by a mysterious Dr. Chadfallow. He manages to find work on the Chathrand, but his special power to understand any language attracts the attention of several stowaway Ixchel. The Ixchel warn Pazel that if he tells anyone of their presence, they will kill him, because sailors hate Ixchel and have developed ways of smoking them out of ships.

Thasha arrives on the Chathrand with her father and household. When Pazel has a fit due to the negative side effect of his power, he bumps into Thasha and she takes him to his cabin. There, Pazel meets Ramachni, a wizard from another world, who grants Pazel three words of great power. However, when Pazel insults Thasha's father, who sacked Pazel's hometown, Pazel is expelled from the ship.

As the voyage progresses, it becomes clear something is not right. Chadfallow had previously warned Pazel not to sail on the Chathrand, only to sail on it himself, the captain writes letters to his dead father, the Ixchel notice that several rats on board the ship have awakened and one of them declares a holy war against the captain, a man attacks Thasha's bodyguard only to be saved by the unassuming Mr. Kett, and Thasha feels that her father's mistress is not entirely trustworthy. There is also talk of someone trying to find the 'Red Wolf,' and the 'Nilstone.'

It is revealed that there are several intertwining conspiracies. The emperor of Arqual wants to ignite a civil war in the rival Mzithrin Empire to weaken them. Mr. Kett, who is really a sorcerer, is there to bring the banished Mzithrin King Shaggat back to power, not just to fight the current kings of the Mzithrin Empire, but to take over the world.

As the ship comes to the haunted coast Mr. Kett leads an expedition out to the coast to find the Red Wolf where the Nilstone is hidden. Pazel, who has made his way to the haunted coast, is captured and made part of the expedition. Thasha escapes the Chathrand and meets up with her tutor to help save the day. With Pazel's help, the Nilstone (enclosed in the Red Wolf) is raised from the depths. Kett, after being temporarily defeated, returns to the ship and manages to give the Nilstone to the Shaggat. However, Pazel uses one of his words to turn the Shaggat to stone, preventing Mr. Kett's plans from coming into fruition.

Captain Nilius Rose declares that after Thasha's wedding the Chathrand will head out to sea, never to return.
