= Marie Brennan =

American fantasy author (born 1980)

- Brennan at World Fantasy Convention 2026
- Born: September 1, 1980 (age 46)
- Education: Harvard University; Indiana University Bloomington
- Occupation: Author
- Writing career
- Period: 2004–present
- Genres: Fantasy, Non-fiction
- Website: www.swantower.com

Bryn Neuenschwander, writing under the pseudonym Marie Brennan, is an American fantasy author. Her works include the Doppelganger duology (Doppelganger and its sequel Warrior and Witch); the Onyx Court series; the Memoirs of Lady Trent series; and numerous short stories. She won the 2025 Hugo Award for Best Poem for her poem "A War of Words".

The first of the Onyx Court novels, Midnight Never Come, published on May 1, 2008 in the United Kingdom, and June 1, 2008 in the United States, received a four star-review from SFX. The Lady Trent series was a finalist for the Hugo Award for Best Series in 2018.

As an undergraduate at Harvard University, Neuenschwander served as co-chair of the Harvard–Radcliffe Science Fiction Association. After graduating from Harvard, she pursued graduate studies at Indiana University Bloomington, studying folklore and anthropology; in 2008 she left graduate school without completing her PhD in order to pursue writing full-time.

== Bibliography ==
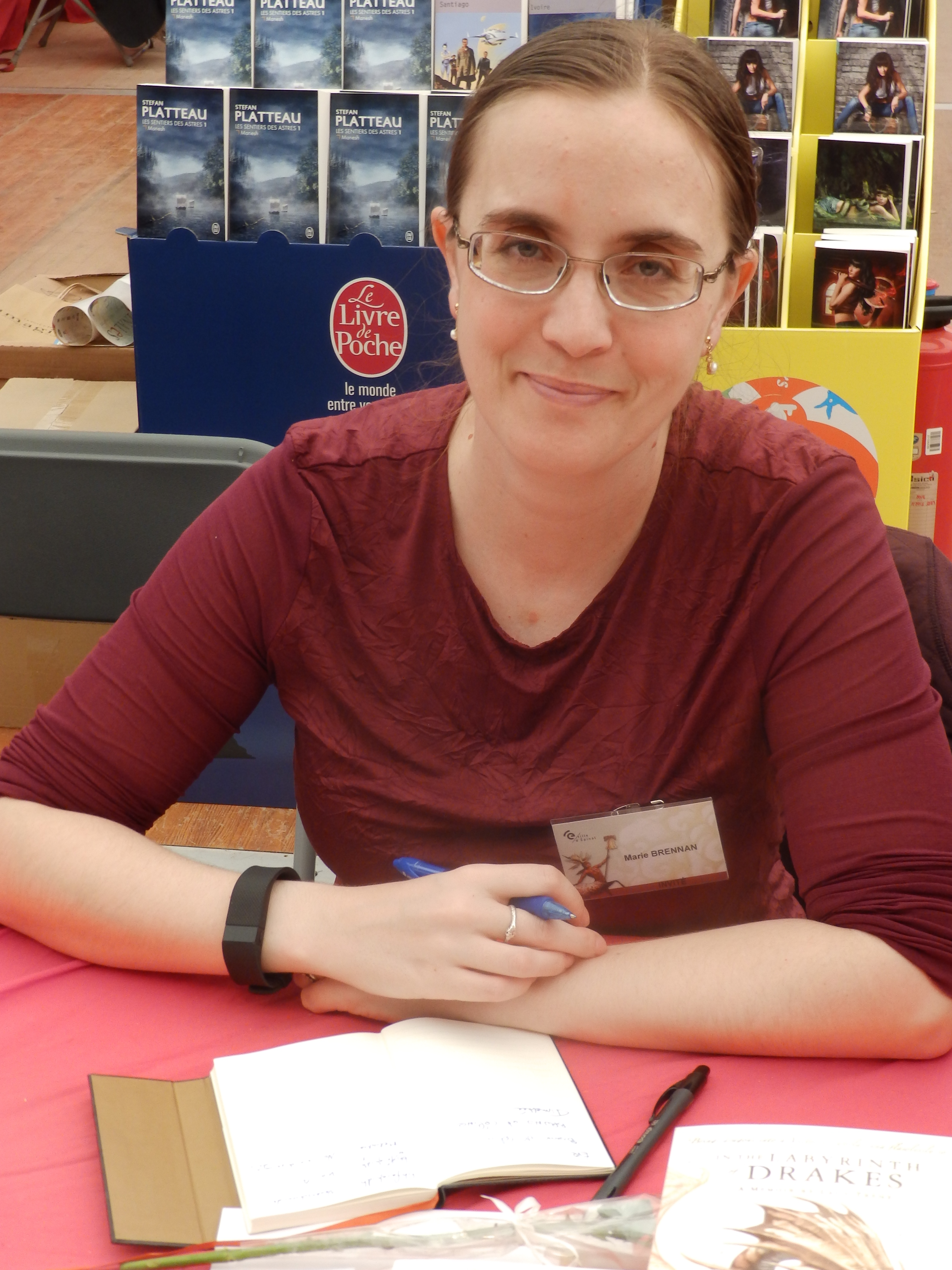
Brennan in 2016

=== Novels ===
==== Doppelganger ====
- Doppelganger (2006) (reissued as Warrior in 2008)
- Warrior and Witch (2006) (reissued as Witch in 2008)

==== Onyx Court ====
- In London's Shadow (Onyx Court Omnibus) (2016)
1. Midnight Never Come (2008)
2. In Ashes Lie (2009)
3. A Star Shall Fall (2010)
4. With Fate Conspire (2011)

==== Memoirs of Lady Trent ====
1. A Natural History of Dragons (2013)
2. The Tropic of Serpents (2014)
3. Voyage of the Basilisk (2015)
4. In the Labyrinth of Drakes (2016)
5. Within the Sanctuary of Wings (2017)
- "From the Editorial Page of the Falchester Weekly Review" (short story) (2016)
- "On the Impurity of Dragon-kind" (short story) (2019)
- Turning Darkness into Light (spinoff novel) (2019)
- "The Long Fall" (described by Brennan as a piece of "authorial fanfic" as an epilogue to Turning Darkness into Light) (2020)

==== The Rook and Rose Trilogy ====
(writing with Alyc Helms as M. A. Carrick)

1. The Mask of Mirrors (2021)
2. The Liar's Knot (2021)
3. Labyrinth's Heart (2023)

==== Driftwood ====
Framework, 1 new story, and short stories freely available on Web except Into the Wind:

1. Driftwood (2009, Beneath Ceaseless Skies, April 2009)
2. A Heretic By Degrees (2008, Orson Scott Card's Intergalactic Medicine Show, December 2008)
3. Into the Wind (2017, Children of a Different Sky, edited by Alma Alexander)
4. The Ascent of Unreason (2021, Beneath Ceaseless Skies, September 2012)
5. Remembering Light (2010, Beneath Ceaseless Skies, June 2010)
6. Smiling at the End of the World (no date found, www.swantower.com)
7. The God of Driftwood (new)

=== Novellas ===
==== Varekai ====
1. "Cold-Forged Flame" (September, 2016)
2. "Lightning in the Blood" (May, 2017)

=== Short stories ===
- White Shadow (2004)
- The Princess and the . . . (2005)
- Silence, Before the Horn (2005)
- Shadows' Bride (2005)
- The Twa Corbies (2005)
- For the Fairest (2005)
- Sing for Me (2006)
- The Wood, the Bridge, the House (2006)
- Such as Dreams Are Made Of (2006)
- Execution Morning (Glorifying Terrorism, 2007)
- A Thousand Souls (2007)
- But Who Shall Lead the Dance? (2007)
- Selection (2007)
- Nine Sketches, in Charcoal and Blood (2007)
- Lost Soul (2008)
- Kiss of Life (2008)
- Never After: Twelve Tales
- Beggar's Blessing
- The Deaths of Christopher Marlowe
- A Mask of Flesh
- Once a Goddess
- The Gospel of Nachash

=== Articles ===
- Mesoamerican Calendars (2004)
- The Logic of Sacrifice (2004)
- Bull-Leaping in Bronze Age Crete (2005)
- Ireland's Ancient Code (2005)
- That Fairy-Tale Feel: A Folkloric Approach to Meredith Ann Pierce's The Darkangel (2006)
