= The Chathrand Voyage =

The Chathrand Voyage is a fantasy book series written by American author Robert V.S. Redick. It is published by Gollancz Publishing in Great Britain and Canada, and Del Rey Publishing in the United States.

== Premise ==
On the fictional world of Alifros, a conspiracy is hatched by the Emperor of the great Empire of Arqual to plunge their rival empire, the Mzithrin, into civil war. The captain and crew of the IMS Chathrand, an ancient and powerful Great Ship, are dispatched supposedly on a mission of peace to deliver a "treaty bride" for a Mzithrini prince to wed, but in reality are setting into motion a series of events designed to destroy the Mzithrin from within. Unknown to them, a powerful sorcerer is planning to use this plot against the conspirators themselves--turning the destruction back on the Empire of Arqual.

The young treaty bride (Thasha Isiq), a bonded servant or 'tarboy' (Pazel Pathkendle) and various allies discover these nested intrigues and resolve to thwart them, lest war ravage the whole of the known world.

== Books in the series ==
| # | Title | Publication Date |
|---|---|---|
| 1. | The Red Wolf Conspiracy | 2008 |
| 2. | The Ruling Sea | 2009 |
| 3. | The River of Shadows | 2011 |
| 4. | The Night of the Swarm | 2013 |
