= Labyrinth's Heart =

2023 fantasy novel by M.A. Carrick

- Author: M.A. Carrick
- Audio read by: Nikki Massoud
- Series: The Rook and Rose
- Release number: 3
- Genre: Fantasy
- Published: 15 Aug 2023
- Publisher: Orbit Books
- ISBN: 9780316539739
- Preceded by: The Liar's Knot

Brennan and Helms at World Fantasy Convention 2026

Labyrinth's Heart is a 2023 novel by M.A. Carrick. Carrick is a pseudonym for authors Marie Brennan and Alyc Helms, who wrote the novel jointly. It is the concluding volume in the Rook and Rose trilogy.

== Plot ==
At a Traementis family ball, Letilia returns to Nadežra for the first time in decades. She initially maintains the fiction that Renata is her daughter instead of a thieving former servant. Letilia begins to blackmail Ren.

Ren longs to marry Grey Serrado, but anti-Vraszenian prejudice prevents it. She stages a public contest in which the winner receives the right to court her. Grey is eventually declared the victor. An angry Letilia exposes Ren’s true identity. Donaia orders Ren to leave and never return.

Meanwhile, Koszar Andrejek and his rival Branek vie for control of the Stadnem Anduske. Branek plans to take control of the Old Island, the site of the Vraszenians’ sacred Wellspring. To do this, Branek conspires with Grey’s estranged grandmother, Laročja Szerado.

Vargo is kidnapped by Branek’s allies. Ren uses her pattern cards to restore the Rook. As the Rook, Grey rescues Vargo.

The szorsas of Nadežra elect Ren as the speaker for the lost clan of the Ižranyi. Andrejek triumphs over Branek in a religious ritual, winning the support of Laročja and regaining control of the Stadnem Anduske. Andrejek still plans to take over the Old Island, but promises to avoid unnecessary bloodshed.

Donaia and Giuna visit Ren. Ren reveals the truth about the medallions and her identity as the Black Rose. The Traementis forgive her and agree to help her destroy the medallions. Donaia then blackmails Letilia into leaving the city.

Ren marries Grey. A zlyzen appears and leads them into the realm of dreams. She learns that the zlyzen were once humans of the Ižranyi clan, who were killed by the power of a Primordial.

Andrejek’s rebellion begins. The Anduske seize control of the Old Island. The Cinquerat responds by cutting off the water supply for the entire city. All ten medallions are brought to the site of the Wellspring. Tanaquis almost decides to keep one medallion; Grey pushes her hand into a fire. Tanaquis loses her hand, but all ten medallions are successfully destroyed.

Ren reunites with her extended family, from whom she had been separated after the death of her mother. She then confronts Laročja, exposing her as a fraudulent szorsa. Peace terms are reached; the Cinquerat will be replaced by a seven-member Setterat, including Liganti, Vraszenian, and Nadežran members. Finally, Ren frees the zlyzen from their curse. They are returned to human form and reclaim their identities as the lost Ižranyi clan. The Ižranyi tell Grey that the power of the medallions was not lost: instead, it was transferred to Tanaquis when her hand was burned during the destruction ritual.

The night of the Great Dream arrives, and the Wellspring appears in the waking world. Tanaquis, mad with a desire to understand the cosmos, dives into the Wellspring. The Wellspring is tainted by her Primordial power. Ren convinces Tanaquis to give up her unhealthy search for certainty, and they leave the Wellspring safely. The Labyrinth of Nadežra, destroyed centuries prior by Kaius Rex, is restored to its original grandeur.

Ren learns that Tanaquis possessed one of the medallions throughout her time in Nadežra. She conspired with Ondrakja and Mettore Indestor. Tanaquis is sentenced to indentured servitude.

Ren and her companions dance the kanina, a traditional Vraszenian dance thought to call the spirits of the dead. She reunites with the ghost of her mother. In an epilogue, Ren and Vargo have been elected to the Sesserat.

== Reception and awards ==
Marion Deeds of fantasyliterature.com gave the novel four stars out of five. Deeds praised the inclusion of Letilia, writing that her inclusion in the third and final book of the trilogy was worth the wait. Deeds also praised the character arc of Tanaquis, whose "evolution is surprising and completely believable." The reviewer found the character arcs of Vargo and Grey to be less impressive. Despite these critiques, the review concluded by stating that "I want to believe in the dramatic political changes rung in at the end. Along the way, the book delivers excitement, magic, puzzles, betrayals and chills... If you haven’t read the first two, you might want to start."

David Faucheux of Library Journal reviewed the audiobook, recommending it "for those who enjoy fantasy in the vein of Lee [sic] Bardugo’s "Six of Crows," Foz Meadows’s “Tithenai Chronicles,” or E.E. Holmes’s “Riftmagic Saga” series." Faucheux praised Nikki Massoud's narration, stating that she "ably handles Carrick’s intricately built world, including the complex names and vocabulary relating to numinatria, the sacred numerology that underpins this magical society."

Liz Bourke of Locus called the novel a "fantastic conclusion", stating that the authors "have given the trilogy a revolutionary, explosive climax – in both political and emotional terms." Bourke compared the setting and style to Swordspoint by Ellen Kushner, noting a "kind of sensibility that’s always struck me as a working in a very Renaissance vein, even when it doesn’t draw directly on the aesthetics of late medieval Italy." Bourke concluded that Labyrinth's Heart "is a novel full of tension and incident, colour and verve. It has style and a sense of humour, and as the capstone to the trilogy it more than lives up to its predecessors."

Publishers Weekly called the novel "laborious", writing that "There are so many dominos set up in the previous books that need to fall, and the unfortunate result of the author’s diligently hitting them all is glacial pacing and a lack of suspense in the ultimate showdown."
