= At Bay Press =

Canadian trade book publishing company

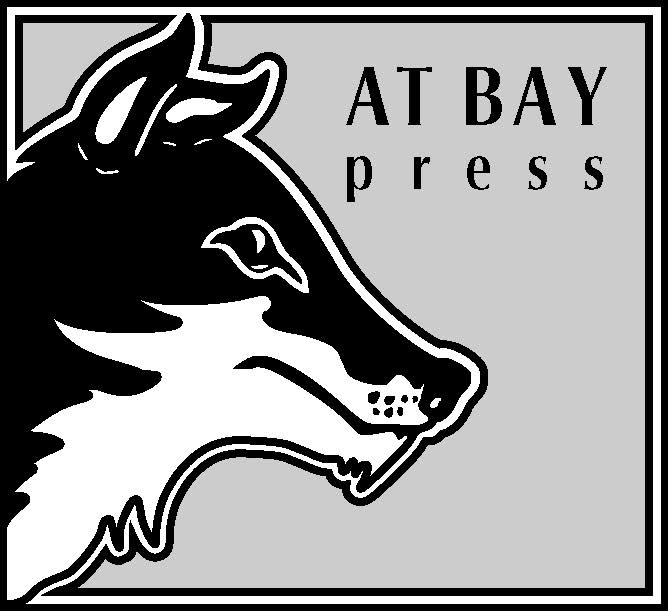
- At Bay Press publishing house logo
- Founded: 2008
- Country of origin: Canada
- Headquarters location: Winnipeg
- Distribution: UTP (Canada); Casemate Group (USA/Mexico/South America); Gazelle Book Services (UK); Durnell Books (EU); Peribo (Australia)
- Publication types: Books
- Official website: atbaypress.com

At Bay Press is a Canadian trade book publishing company specializing in contemporary fiction, graphic novels, poetry, and non-fiction. It is based in Winnipeg, Manitoba, and was established in 2008 in Toronto, Ontario. The press has become known for publishing titles by emerging and oftentimes undiscovered authors.

In addition to its trade book publishing business, the press specializes in handcrafted books. Many of the books published by the press are held in permanent government, public, and private collections worldwide. The company is a member of the Association of Canadian Publishers, the Association of the Manitoba Book Publishers, Canadian Book Binders and Book Artists Guild and the Fine Press Book Association.

The press garnered attention from the media in 2015 when one of its titles, Woman – An Anthology, won the Independent Publisher Book Award gold medal for "Independent Spirit" as an Outstanding Book of the Year. The book features contributions by Stephen King, Nobel Prize winning author Alice Munro, Giller Prize winning author Lynn Coady, Peter O'Donnell (creator of the literary character Modesty Blaise), as well as several other authors.

The press is noted for its poetry publishing, such as its title Stars by Kwakwakaʼwakw author Lucy Hemphill with illustrations by Michael Joyal, which was selected by CBC as one of the 12 best books of Canadian poetry in 2018.
