= Septimus Heap: The Magykal Papers =

2009 book by Angie Sage

- Cover art for The Magykal Papers by Mark Zug
- Author: Angie Sage
- Cover artist: Mark Zug (illustrator)
- Language: English
- Series: Septimus Heap (Spin-off)
- Genre: Fantasy novel
- Publisher: HarperCollins and Bloomsbury Publishing
- Publication date: July 2009
- Publication place: England
- Media type: Print (Hardback & Paperback)
- Pages: 176
- ISBN: 978-0-06-170416-1

Septimus Heap: The Magykal Papers is a supplementary book to the Septimus Heap series by Angie Sage. Released on June 23, 2009, the book is divided into four sections dealing with The Castle, The Palace, The Wizard Tower and the other parts of the Septimus Heap world. It consists of biographies of the main characters, their journals and notes, and other items.

== Development ==
Septimus Heap: The Magykal Papers is a supplement to the series, which was published in July 2009 in full colour in a larger format, with illustrations by Mark Zug. During developing the supplementary, Angie Sage said in an interview that she was enjoying the process of developing this guide-book and thinking about the book's structure and all its characters.

== Synopsis ==
The book is divided into four sections. The first section, "Papers from the Castle," opens with a bit of history. It tells about the background of how The Castle developed from a little village and how the Queen came to stay there and the arrival of the ExtraOrdinary Wizard. This is followed by Rupert Gringe's Around-the-Castle Boat Tour programme. Other tours are represented, such as the "Ask Sirius Walking Tour of the Castle and the Ramblings" and Silas Heap's ink-splotched "A Ramble through the Ramblings Walking Tour." After a restaurant guide, the biographies of the main characters start. Never before known facts about Sarah and Silas Heap, Jenna, Mr. and Mrs. Gringe, Marcia Overstrand, ghost Alther Mella, spy Linda Lane and the main protagonist Septimus Heap. One can delve even deeper into these personalities by way of the journals, letters, appointment diaries, and family trees.

The second part, "Papers from the Wizard Tower" includes a brief history of the construction of the Wizard Tower and rules and regulations one should consider while visiting the Tower. It also includes Septimus' homeworks and its corrections by Marcia and a pamphlet by Alther Mella, on assisting recently turned ghosts in the afterlife. The third part, entitled "Papers from The Palace" describes the Palace as a whole and includes Jenna's private journals and a brief history of some notable queens. The last part talks about the Message Rat service and other locations of the Castle.

== Reception ==
Terry Miller Shannon from Kidsreads.com was impressed with the book and commented "The Magykal Papers, filled with tidbits of information, hilarious asides and a smidgeon of dragon poo (not to mention a list of 10 important rules to being dead), is truly irresistible, completely enjoyable, and most definitely 'magykal'.[...] Fans of Septimus Heap will go wild for this encyclopedic supplement to the series. The full-color illustrations and amazing range of papers from the Castle, the Wizard Tower, the Palace and "Around the Castle" make this a book to get lost in for many enjoyable hours."
