= Marcia Overstrand =

- Septimus Heap character
- Marcia Overstrand as illustrated by Mark Zug
- First appearance: Magyk
- Created by: Angie Sage

In-universe information
- Alias: The scary lady
- Nickname: Marcia
- Title: The ExtraOrdinary Wizard
- Occupation: ExtraOrdinary Wizard

Marcia Overstrand is a fictional character in the Septimus Heap series by Angie Sage. She is a powerful ExtraOrdinary Wizard. Septimus is her apprentice.

== Description ==
Marcia is described as a tall woman with characteristic green wizard eyes and long, dark, wavy hair. She wears a deep purple tunic, held at the waist by her "ExtraOrdinary Wizard" belt and a purple cloak which is part of her Magyk. Around her neck is the "Akhu Amulet of Hotep-Ra", the source of power for "ExtraOrdinary Wizards". Marcia also wears a pair of pointy purple python skin boots made for her by shoemaker Terry Tarsal. Terry very much dislikes snakes, and swears Marcia orders snakeskin on purpose, which may or may not be true. She has an aura of Magyk around her. Marcia can be fascinating and bossy, and scary to those around her. She is ambitious.

== Development ==
The Marcia character was key in Sage's development and continuation of the Heap series, as she motivates a lot of Septimus's decisions.

== Plot ==
=== Marcia becomes the ExtraOrdinary Wizard ===
Marcia always wanted to be an ExtraOrdinary Wizard. She made sure she apprenticed to Alther Mella, the ExtraOrdinary Wizard of her day. Alther was a patient teacher and a good wizard. After Marcia completed her final wizard examination, the heir to the Castle was born. Marcia and Alther went to the Palace to congratulate the Queen. However, the Queen and Alther were both murdered by an assassin. Before dying, Alther gave Marcia the "Akhu Amulet" making Marcia the ExtraOrdinary Wizard. Marcia was able to protect the new baby princess and gave her to a Wizard, Silas Heap for hiding. He raised her as his own daughter, Jenna.

=== Progress ===
When Jenna is ten, Marcia takes her away with the assistance of Silas, his son Nicko and a "Young Army" boy called 'Boy 412'. Marcia does a Projection while escaping to Marram Marshes to fend off the Hunters. At Zelda's cottage, Marcia learns that the Necromancer, DomDaniel, has taken over the Wizard Tower. She wants to take revenge but Alther's ghost warns her not to. While teaching the children about Magyk, she learns that Boy 412 has immense Magykal powers. Marcia asks him to be her apprentice, but Boy 412 refuses. One day, Marcia receives a message from Silas and goes back to the Castle, but it is a trap and she is caught by DomDaniel's guards. DomDaniel throws her in "Dungeon Number One' and takes away her amulet, which drains all her powers. Boy 412, assisted by Jenna and Nicko, board DomDaniel's ship and a fight ensues which results in Marcia taking back her amulet and escaping on the Dragon Boat. Boy 412 accepts the offer of apprenticeship, and Marcia realises that he is the real Septimus Heap. Marcia returns to the Wizard Tower in Flyte. She rids the Tower of the Darkenesse left by DomDaniel, but cannot rid it of a shadow that trails her. Marcia builds a Shadow Safe, but DomDaniel's bones have been placed within. They later reassemble and try to kill Marcia, but she identified them for who they used to be and prevails.

In Physik, Marcia comes to learn that Septimus has been sent back in time by being pulled through a magykal looking glass in the Queen's Room by Marcellus Pye. In the meantime, an evil Queen Etheldredda's spirit (who sent Septimus back) gets released by Silas Heap when he unseals her portrait and wreaks havoc on the Castle. Marcia does all she can to retrieve Septimus and stop a sicknesse from spreading, but nothing seems to work. Jenna, Nicko and Snorri go back in time and retrieve Septimus, but sadly Nicko and Snorri get trapped in that time. When Septimus gets back he and Marcia create an antidote for the sicknesse by using what he learned from Marcellus. Marcia, on learning Etheldredda's evil plan to kill Jenna so she can be queen forever, decides to destroy her. She makes a huge BoneFyre out of Septimus' pet dragon Spit Fyre's fire and through strong magic, pulls Etheldredda's spirit to the fire and destroys her forever. She is also able to destroy Etheldredda's pet called Aie-Aie who was responsible for the sicknesse.

In order to control Septimus' moves, Marcia takes away his Flyte Charm and locks it. Tertius Fume, an ancient evil ghost, calls for the legendary drawing of the Queste stone. Marcia prevents this by helping Septimus escape, assisted by Jenna and his friend Beetle, who discovers that going to the House of Foryx will enable them to find Nicko and Snorri. He also realizes that going there is actually the Queste. Marcia tries to find him through her magic and even enlists Simon's help through his tracker ball, Sleuth. But all hope seems failing when Septimus communicates to her his whereabouts by writing on a twin of Marcia's door. She takes Sarah Heap and goes on Septimus' dragon to the House of Foryx, where she bangs on the door, ignoring the door bell, and immediately Septimus - followed by the others - come out and all are able to return to their own time.

In Syren Marcia promotes Septimus to Senior Apprentice, because he was the first to complete and come back alive from his Queste. Septimus immediately jumps at the chance to take leave meet up with Jenna, Nicko, and Snorri (who stayed behind across the sea with Milo Banda), and Marcia reluctantly lets him do so. At the end when Tertius Fume attempts to murder Marcia with an army of warrior jinnee stolen from Milo. With several swords at Marcia's throat, Septimus and his own jinnee - Jim Knee - race to freeze the whole army, and save her. And they do. And they win

== Character ==
=== Magical power ===
Marcia is an extremely powerful wizard. She can perform any kind of magyk. She is able to create a fog as well as a projection at the same time, which even Silas (who generally doesn't approve of Marcia) admires. She is even adept at little Physik, as when she cures Septimus' spider bite with a little dark magic in Flyte. She can transport freely from one place to another like she did in Magyk or Queste. She is adept at day to day needy magyks like cleaning and transfiguration. She modifies Zelda's desk by adding hands to it in Magyk or cleaning up the scribes mess in a trifle in Queste. She knows how to dispel darke unruly magic like a placement and escapes from it in Flyte. She is knowledgeable in disabling magyk such as restrain, silence and freeze.

=== Other traits, possessions and likes ===
Marcia is generally short tempered and impatient. Marcia cannot keep patience with Sarah or Septimus' pet Spit Fyre, Silas' pet wolfhound Maxie or the manuscriptorium chief scribe Jillie Djinn. Her temper scares people the most about her, though Marcia does not believe that she is scary as is evident in Magyk. At the same time she is ambitious and knowledgeable. She loves Septimus and Jenna and shows them her soft side. Although it seems that she and Silas are constantly bickering, they respect each other. She is on good terms with the ghost of her mentor Alther and still seeks his knowledge and help. She hates Aunt Zelda's cabbage sandwiches. In Queste she decides to be patient with Marcellus Pye although she disapproves of him, as he could have helped her find Septimus. Among Marcia's dearest possessions are her purple python skin boots which she has stockpiled after her favorite ones were ruined in events from Magyk.

== Reception ==
The character received widespread critical acclaim. She was praised for her dignity and enjoyed for her fashion sense.

== See also ==
- Septimus Heap
- Magyk
- Flyte
- Physik
- Syren
- Septimus Heap (character)
- Jenna Heap
