= Jenna Heap =

- Septimus Heap character
- Jenna Heap, as illustrated by artist Mark Zug
- First appearance: Magyk
- Created by: Angie Sage

In-universe information
- Aliases: Jenna, the Queenling
- Title: The Princess
- Family: The Royal Family, The Heaps
- Relatives: Silas Heap (adoptive father); Sarah Heap (adoptive mother); Septimus Heap (adoptive brother); Nicko Heap (adoptive brother); Jo-Jo Heap (adoptive brother); Edd Heap (adoptive brother); Erik Heap (adoptive brother); Sam Heap (adoptive brother); Simon Heap (adoptive brother); Zelda Zanuba Heap (adoptive great-aunt); Grandpa Benji (adoptive grandfather); Edmund Heap (adoptive uncle); Ernold Heap (adoptive uncle); Milo Banda (birth father); Cerys (birth mother); Queen Etheldredda (great-great-etc. grandmother); Marcellus Pye (great-great-etc. uncle); Princess Esmeralda (great-great-etc. grandmother)

Jenna Heap is a leading character in the Septimus Heap book series by Angie Sage. She is the adoptive sister of Septimus and the adoptive daughter of Silas and Sarah Heap. Jenna has many friends in the book, and many enemies, too. Although she acknowledges they are not her birth family, Jenna loves her adoptive family including her seven brothers, her grandfather Benji, her parents, and her Aunt Zelda.

== Description ==
Jenna is a young princess, with deep violet eyes and a fair complexion. She is small for her age and wears a red tunic which is secured about the waist with a golden sash. Her dark hair is kept in place by a thin golden circlet, which denotes that she is the princess. Her appearance resembles that of all the queens before her, and she resembles her birth mother closely. Although very loving and caring, she can sometimes be very stubborn, as is observed by her older brothers.

== In the story ==
=== How she came to be a Heap ===
After Jenna was born, her mother, Queen Cerys, was assassinated. Marcia Overstrand, the apprentice of the ExtraOrdinary Wizard, took the baby Jenna to safety, after watching the murders of the ExtraOrdinary Wizard and the queen. To protect the young princess, in case the assassin was to return, Marcia gave her to Silas Heap, an Ordinary Wizard. Silas' seventh son, Septimus, was born on the same day as Jenna, but he supposedly died. Silas and his wife, Sarah Heap, adopted and raised the princess.

=== After her discovery ===
In the first book, Magyk, Marcia tells Jenna on her 10th birthday that she is a princess and that she has been discovered. Marcia escapes with Jenna to the Marram Marshes, accompanied by Silas, his son Nicko, and a young army guard called Boy 412. At Aunt Zelda's place in the Marram Marshes, Jenna becomes friends with Boy 412 and begins to learn magic from Marcia. She, along with Boy 412 and Nicko, discover a hidden Dragon-Boat, which she discovers is her legacy, and they use it to save Marcia. At the end of the first book, Jenna learns that Boy 412 is her long-lost adoptive brother, Septimus Heap.

The second book, Flyte, opens with Jenna getting kidnapped by her estranged brother Simon, who takes her to his hideout in the Badlands. Jenna escapes and meets her brothers Septimus and Nicko at the port, but a dark stranger tails her. Jenna, along with the others, is discovered by Simon's tracking ball, Sleuth, and a battle begins, with Jenna's side aided by the Dragon-Boat. Simon damages the Dragon-Boat, but gets captured. Jenna, who loves the Dragon-Boat, becomes hysterical and goes to a secret room in the Palace called the queen's room, which is only accessible by queens or princesses. She gets Aunt Zelda to perform the "transubstantiate triple" spell to revive the boat. In the end, the dark stranger is revealed to be her biological father, Milo Banda.

In Physik, the spirit of the evil Queen Etheldredda tricks Jenna into sending Septimus back in time to her son, Marcellus Pye. Jenna becomes determined to get Septimus back. She is assisted by her brother, Nicko, and Snorri Snorrelssen, a northern trader girl. Together they go back in time to get Septimus. In the past it is revealed that Jenna has an uncanny resemblance to Etheldredda's daughter, Princess Esmeralda. It is noticeable how Jenna starts accepting her position as princess.

When Septimus is tricked to go on a Queste, Jenna and Beetle accompany him. They go to the legendary "House of Foryx", where Nicko and Snorri might be trapped. Jenna helps Septimus in his search and ultimately finds them. By this time Jenna has developed into a mature girl and young princess. Septimus' friend Beetle develops a crush on her.

In Syren, Jenna is returning from assisting Septimus on his quest when they meet up with Milo Banda. Nicko and Snorri stay on the "Cerys", but Jenna, Beetle, and Septimus fly home on Spit Fyre. Along the way they are stranded on an island with a mysterious girl. With the help of Lucy Gringe, Wolf Boy, and Jakey Fry they stop Skipper Fry and Tertius Fume from taking over the castle with an army of jinn.

== Character speciality ==
=== Relationships ===
Jenna is extremely close with her adoptive brothers, Septimus and Nicko. Although she learns her real parents' identities, she loves Silas and Sarah as before. When she met her real father, Milo Banda, she quarreled with him for not coming for her, but later they reconciled. Jenna loves the ghost of the ExtraOrdinary Wizard, Alther Mella, and is sometimes awed by Marcia. Although she first likes Snorri, she grows to blame her for Nicko getting trapped back in time, and they never really form a friendship. Beetle is shown to have developed romantic feelings for her, unnoticed by Jenna, which leads to Beetle deciding that he no longer has a crush on her, although he still seems unsure. She returns these feelings in Fyre after noticing that Beetle seems to push her off, and she realizes she must have done the same.

==== Relationship with Septimus Heap ====
Jenna Heap's relationship with Septimus has often been brought under scrutiny as they seem to share of a more romantic relationship than most brothers or sisters. This may be a result of Septimus having never grown up Jenna in the first ten years of his life and that they are not related at all. Their mutual liking for each other is immediately identifiable in the first book in a number of situations. For example, when walking with her adoptive brother Nicko (with whom she has been with her whole life, so there has never been any ideas of a romantic relationship between the two), Jenna hints that she likes Boy 412 (who was not identified as Septimus Heap until the very end of the novel). Likewise, Septimus worries about Jenna the most and she shares this likewise.

Throughout the series, Septimus and Jenna have been considered the main protagonists and are usually found together in the novels. Their relationship has also been brought to question a number of times in the series. For example, in the novel Physik, the ghost Etheldredda points out to Jenna that Septimus is her adoptive brother, to which Jenna steely asserts that he is her brother, leaving the "adoptive" out. In The Magykal Papers (a supplementary work for the series), Jenna Heap's biography states that of all people, there is no one else she would rather be with than Septimus. This same trend seems to have continued in the TodHunter Moon moon series as Jenna shows an instant dislike to a girl Septimus brings and expresses what seems like romantic jealousy over Septimus for going on a string of girlfriends.

Likeweise, the likelihood for any boy or girl to accept another boy or girl she or he has grown a liking to as their sibling is minimum and highly questionable. Many have thought that while it is highly likely for Septimus to easily accept his biological brothers as his family, to accept Jenna Heap (who has no relationship at all with the family) is undeniably and highly improbable. In addition to this, Jenna is also seemingly unaware of the feelings Beetle seems to have for her, as she is usually preoccupied in worrying about what trouble Septimus may be in.

=== Possessions ===
Jenna Heap has a golden circlet that she wears around her head as a crown. Jenna had a pet rock called Petroc Trelawney in the first book, who helped her remember her life at the castle. The rock wandered away during one of her midsummer day visits, but Wolf Boy finds it later at Aunt Zelda's cottage, and returns it to Jenna. She also had a silver bullet and the Hunter's pistol, both of which she acquired during her first visit at the Keeper's Cottage, when the Hunter was after her. She has a Quetzalcoatl chocolate charm given to her by Septimus, which helps her escape from Simon. In the third book, Princess Esmeralda's diary is probably one of the most important items, as it tells Jenna the truth about Etheldredda and gives her a warning and time to escape. She also has Snorri's map to the House of Foryx restored from the manuscriptorium. She has a pet duck, Ethel, whom she saved from an orange soup during Etheldredda's time. Jenna also has the True Crown, that she got after Queen Etheldredda's ghost was destroyed.

=== Magykal power ===
Jenna doesn't have many magykal powers since she has no magykal blood in her veins. She can do Magyk but it doesn't come very easily to her, and she will never have the trademark green eyes that characterize the wizards. However, it is implied that queens have some form of magykal power running in them. Jenna also has a special connection with the Dragon-Boat, which runs throughout the Queen's dynasty.

=== Family ===
Jenna is the adoptive sister of: Simon, Sam, Edd, Erik [Edd and Erik are twins], Jo-Jo, Nicko, and Septimus Heap. She seems to be closest with Nicko and Septimus. Her relationship with Simon was destroyed after Simon joined forces with DomDaniel in an attempt to otherthrow Marcia and kill Jenna. Sam, Jo-Jo, Erik and Edd all took up a new home at Camp Heap in the heart of the forest and refused to leave. Although they still appear to love Jenna, none attempt to make contact with the outside world at all, not even when Jenna is kidnapped by Simon, or when Septimus is taken through the Doors of Time.

Her adoptive parents are Silas and Sarah Heap. Her biological parents are Milo Banda and Queen Cerys.

== Reception ==
The character received universal acclaim from critics. According to Sabina Qazi from Dawn.com, "Sage has given most of the other characters more attention than was warranted, blurring the line between the protagonists and the secondary characters, Jenna hardly emerge as a hero. Furthermore, the ease with which they, along with their aunt Zelda, dispatch their awe-inspiring enemy, Hunter, takes away a bit from their glory. Yet this very element, makes for light and humorous reading and renders the children more identifiable." She also said that Jenna is a well-rounded character and is identifiable in a real world scenario. Her character comes off like the new best friend somebody has in the neighbourhood.

Cat Maniego from Manila Standard Today described her as a dark-haired girl with strong resolve. But she expressed disappointment over the somewhat ambiguous characterization of Jenna:

As the Princess or Queenling, she comes from a turbulent past and is thrust into the anonymous world of ordinary society without any inkling of her royal background. The reader is therefore left guessing whether or not she has it in her to rise to the tenets of her position as ruler of the Castle. Hopefully she becomes more fleshed out in the succeeding books.

In Childrensbooksreview, one reviewer said that with Physik the character of Jenna was more enjoyable and real than ever.

According to Bookguild her character comes off as:

a strong and courageous young lady, just as her adoptive brother Septimus is a strong and courageous young man. She has matured from the average little girl who wants to deny being a princess and just hide.

Fantasy Literature gave a positive review for her character and said that Jenna is a bright, good and compassionate protagonist. Together with Septimus, they make a good team and are friendly, likeable and intelligent characters in their own right. However, they pointed out that her character has similarities with Ginny Weasley from Harry Potter in that Jenna is also the youngest of seven siblings, all boys, including twins. One weakness in the plot discussed in their review was the lack of a significant relationship between Jenna and her biological father. He has a cameo role in the second book, but their relationship is not explored at all.

== See also ==
- Septimus Heap
- Magyk
- Flyte
- Physik
- Queste
