= Magyk =

2005 novel by Angie Sage

- by Mark Zug
- Author: Angie Sage
- Cover artist: Mark Zug (illustrator)
- Language: English
- Series: Septimus Heap (Book 1)
- Genre: Fantasy novel
- Publisher: HarperCollins and Bloomsbury Publishing
- Publication date: March 2005
- Publication place: England
- Media type: Print (hardback & paperback)
- Pages: 564 (+32 of EXTRAS) (paperback edition)
- ISBN: 0-7475-7820-6 (UK paperback edition)
- OCLC: 60383978
- Followed by: Flyte

Magyk (an archaic spelling of "Magic") is a fantasy novel written by English author Angie Sage. It is the first book in the seven-book Septimus Heap series. The sequel, Flyte was released in March 2006, Physik in March 2007, Queste in 2008, Syren in September 2009, Darke in July 2011, and Fyre in 2013. The book cover of Magyk alludes to the diary that the ExtraOrdinary Wizard Marcia makes for her apprentice, Septimus Heap. The cover also depicts Septimus's Dragon Ring, rendered as if it were sitting atop the diary.

== Setting ==
The story's setting is mainly centred on the Marram Marshes, which is where Aunt Zelda lives. It also takes place in a castle simply known as "The Castle", which started as a small village inside the curve of a river. A moat was built to prevent witches and wolverines from a nearby forest from attacking the inhabitants.

== Plot ==
The book begins with Silas Heap, father of the eponymous protagonist of the series, returning home through the winter snow. As he is walking, he feels a heartbeat in the snow, through Magykal means, and finds that a newborn baby girl with violet eyes has seemingly been abandoned in the snow. Since Silas already has six children and a new one born just that day, he finds that another will do no harm and that his wife, Sarah Heap, will not disagree. He hides the baby in his cloak and continues his trek home. However, he is confronted by the ExtraOrdinary Wizard, Marcia Overstrand, who warns him that he should not tell anyone about the baby he found and that he should say the child was born to him. Silas agrees, as she is the new ExtraOrdinary Wizard. Silas continues his walk home, to bring his wife the herbs she needs and a new child.

Upon reaching his home, Silas sees the midwife run out with a bundle of cloth, announcing that his newborn Septimus, the seventh son of a seventh son, is dead. Silas and his wife, Sarah, decide to raise the baby girl in place of Septimus as if she was their own daughter. They name their child Jenna.

Months later, Sarah learns from her friend Sally Mullin that the queen has been assassinated, and the castle is under the control of the Supreme Custodian. As well, the queen's newborn daughter had gone missing. Sally also says that the assassination had occurred months before, but had been kept a secret. She mentions that it happened around the time Alther Mella, Marcia's mentor, had been killed. Sarah realizes that Jenna is the missing princess, but decides to keep this a secret from everyone, other than Silas.

Ten years later, Jenna Heap is celebrating her tenth birthday with her parents and six other brothers. Marcia Overstrand interrupts the party, telling the family that the woman living next door works as a spy for the Supreme Custodian, and has confirmed with him that Jenna is the queen's daughter. Marcia states that she must take Jenna into safekeeping right away, for the Assassin is on his way. Sarah agrees and explains to a reluctant Jenna that she is a princess and that she must go with Marcia.

Marcia whisks Jenna to her apartment in the Wizard Tower, where she can temporarily be kept safe. Marcia also finds a boy, part of the Young Army, buried in the snow and close to death. The boy, called Boy 412, is rescued by Marcia and is taken into her apartment to warm up. The Assassin, being a skilled huntsman, manages to locate Jenna's whereabouts, and goes after her. Silas, Nicko (the youngest of the six brothers), and their dog Maxie decide to pay Jenna a visit. Shortly after they arrive, the ghost of Alther Mella warns Marcia that the Assassin is outside the tower. Marcia panics and tries to get everyone, including Boy 412, out of the tower through the rubbish chute. The group ends up in the dump, with a Hunter hot on their heels. Marcia clogs the chute to make it look as though they had gotten stuck. The owner of the nearby cafe, Sally Mullin, finds them and shelters them in her cafe. Silas tells her about their predicament, and Sally allows them to use her sailboat to escape. Marcia gives Sally a KeepSafe Charm in return for her thanks. Silas, Marcia, and the children then flee to the Marram Marshes, with Nicko sailing the boat.

The Hunter reaches the dump and spends quite a while unclogging the chute. After sending one of his men to make sure they are still not stuck somewhere inside, he looks for anyone who may have seen the escapees. He notices Sally and confronts her. She denies knowing anything, but her actions prove otherwise. He threatens to burn down her café unless she confesses. She still refuses, but one of her customers rats out Marcia's group, and the huntsman allows the customer and his friends to leave before he burns the café down. He locks Sally inside and sets the building on fire. However, Sally survives because of Marcia's KeepSafe Charm.

The Hunter, accompanied by his Pack, follows the group, heading for the Marram Marshes. His skilled men manage to catch up with the small sailboat but are unable to see them through the thick Magykal fog that Marcia conjures. Boy 412 causes a scuffle, for he thinks that the wizards are holding him captive. Jenna, just a bit stronger than 412 (much to his dismay) manages to keep him quiet, before he kicks the boat, and alerts the Hunter where the boat is. Marcia uses a spell to Project an image of the Muriel, Sally's boat, and distract the Hunter, upon which he loses the group's trail, and has to return to the castle.

The group reaches the Marshes and must navigate through perilous bogs, but eventually reaches a safe cottage belonging to Zelda Heap, Silas' aunt, and a White Witch. Aunt Zelda keeps everyone safe and well-fed throughout the winter. The group learns that the Supreme Custodian is doing the bidding of DomDaniel, an ex-ExtraOrdinary Wizard and an evil Necromancer; with Marcia and Jenna gone from the Castle, he is free to return and wreak havoc on the inhabitants. The Heaps, Marcia, and Boy 412 settle into life at the cottage. After 2 weeks, Marcia decides to make 57 shield bugs to use in case of an emergency.

One day, with a heavy fog covering the island, Boy 412 gets lost when he gets separated from Jenna and Nicko on a walk. He wanders around until he walks through a bush and falls into a hidden hole. He finds himself in a series of tunnels in total darkness. Scared, he begins searching in the dark until he finds a ring shaped like a dragon biting its tail. It shrinks to fit his finger and begins to glow, allowing him to find his way through the tunnels, which happen to lead into Aunt Zelda's closet. He keeps the ring a secret for some time. Marcia begins teaching the children basic Magyk to protect themselves, and Boy 412 finds that he is a natural, even though he has never done Magyk in his life. Marcia sees potential in him and asks him to be her Apprentice, but Boy 412 declines, believing that the only reason he can do Magyk is because of the ring.

Silas receives word that his eldest son, Simon, has gone missing. He sets off to journey back to the Castle to look for him, but soon afterwards is cut off from the Marshes by the area's annual winter storm, the Big Freeze. After several weeks without word from him, a Message Rat finally delivers a strange message, apparently from Silas, asking Marcia to return to the Castle. Marcia leaves at midnight, intending to use the Magykal Midnight Minutes for protection, but is captured upon her arrival because her timepiece was wrong from the energy at Zelda's cottage. She is thrown into Dungeon Number One and nearly dies, but Alther finds her and manages to keep her alive.

When the Big Thaw finally sets in and the Marshes become navigable again, the Hunter, who has discovered the location of the Cottage, takes DomDaniel's Apprentice out into the Marshes and makes another attempt to kill the occupants of the cottage. He finds Jenna, Nicko, and Boy 412 out on one of the islands, and gives chase. Jenna and Boy 412 split off from Nicko and the Hunter follows them until Boy 412 realizes where they are, and tackles Jenna into the concealed hole he'd found weeks ago. He leads her through the tunnels back to Zelda's cottage, where they find the Hunter Frozen by Aunt Zelda, and arrive shortly before Nicko and a captured Apprentice. Zelda and Boy 412 use a spell to erase the Hunter's memories and convince him he is a buffoon looking for work in a circus, and the Hunter leaves, leaving the Apprentice behind. The cottage occupants interrogate the Apprentice and he tells them that his name is Septimus Heap and that he is the seventh son of a seventh son. They don't believe him, as he is an awful person and in league with DomDaniel. Later that night, the Apprentice sneaks out of the cottage and takes the Hunter's abandoned canoe across the Marshes to DomDaniel's ship in Bleak Creek.

After discovering the Apprentice's disappearance the next morning, Jenna, Nicko, and Boy 412 set off to look for him, and discover the ship, as well as Alther hiding nearby. He informs them of all that has happened at the Castle in their absence and that Marcia may be on board the ship. He asks the children not to do anything dangerous and leaves, after which they promptly sneak on board to try and find Marcia. However, they are discovered by DomDaniel, and must make a hasty escape, but not before they do see Marcia and Boy 412 manages to give her his Dragon Ring, which returns her powers. DomDaniel begins to summon a massive storm to try and drown them, which floods the Marshes as they get back to the cottage. Zelda tells them to go down into the tunnels to hide, which they do, taking Maxie with them. In the tunnels, they get a chance to really look at the pictures depicted on the walls. Upon Jenna's touch, the walls open up to reveal a massive cavern containing a golden boat with a dragon's neck and head, tail, and wings. She comes to life when the trio climbs on board and Jenna finds that she can communicate with the dragon as all the Queens used to be able to do during their yearly trips to visit the boat. Due to the huge storm outside, the cavern collapses and floods, allowing the boat to sail again, and fly, as it turns out she is able to do. The trio decides to use the boat to rescue Marcia from the Vengeance.

Onboard the Vengeance, Marcia uses her newly returned Magyk to incapacitate her guards and make her way up to the deck, where she sees the incoming Dragon Boat and a stunned and angered DomDaniel. She takes advantage of his shock to take back the Akhu Amulet, the source of the ExtraOrdinary Wizard's power and leaves him on the deck as the Dragon Boat swoops down and scoops her up. They leave the powerless Vengeance sinking, having been damaged by the storm. The Dragon Boat flies back to the cottage and with the storm fading, the Marshes slowly drain and begin to return to normal.

The next day, Jenna is out admiring the Dragon Boat when she hears something in the water and finds the weak Apprentice clinging to some wreckage from the ship. He claims it sank but he got out, but when Jenna and Nicko bring him back to the cottage, Marcia strikes him down and Magykally returns him to the sunken ship, saying it was DomDaniel in disguise and showing everyone the almost-dead real Apprentice that she found earlier in the day. Zelda is able to nurse the boy back to health and brings him to recover in the cottage, and goes to scry with the moon to find out who he really is.

Marcia returns the Dragon Ring to Boy 412, telling him that he is now the Dragon Master and that things have a habit of working out eventually, referring to his Magykal talent. She asks him again if he would consider becoming her Apprentice, and this time he agrees. Silas, Sarah, and Simon, who was eventually found by Silas, have made their way to the cottage, and they all join in the Apprentice Supper being held to celebrate Boy 412's Apprenticeship. Marcia asks Boy 412 if there is anything he would like as a gift, and he asks to know who he is, as he has grown up in the Young Army since he was a baby. Zelda takes them all to her scrying pond and asks the moon to first show them the family of Boy 412. They see their own reflections in the pond and are disappointed that it didn't work, but only Marcia notices that her reflection is missing from the group. Next, Zelda asks to see Boy 412's mother, and the reflections begin to disappear until only Sarah Heap is left. With realizations beginning to hit everyone, Zelda asks to see Septimus Heap, and Sarah's reflection is replaced by Boy 412's, revealed to be Septimus.

In an epilogue, it is revealed what Aunt Zelda discovered when she was scrying on her own to discover who the Apprentice was. When the Midwife took newborn Septimus away, he was not dead, merely drugged, and she was taking him to be collected to be raised as DomDaniel's Apprentice. She takes the baby to the Young Army barracks nursery, where her own son is being babysat while she is on her mission. She sets Septimus down and picks up her own child, but at that moment, the nurse assigned to collect Septimus from the nursery arrives. Seeing the midwife with a baby in her arms, she wrongly believes it is Septimus and takes him away. Septimus is raised in the Young Army and the midwife's son is raised as DomDaniel's apprentice.

== Characters in Magyk ==
- Septimus Heap: Believed to have died as a newborn, he is the seventh son of a seventh son and the protagonist of the series.
- Marcia Overstrand: The current ExtraOrdinary Wizard, she has a pair of special Purple Python-Skinned Shoes and is known for her short temper and immense Magykal power.
- Zelda Zanuba Heap: The Keeper in the Marram Marshes, also known as Aunt Zelda.
- Silas Heap: The Patriarch Heap and seventh son of Benjamin Heap.
- Sarah Heap: The Matriarch Heap.
- Simon Heap: First son of Sarah and Silas Heap – runs away from his family to marry Lucy Gringe, but doesn't due to her father interrupting the ceremony.
- Sam Heap: Second son of Sarah and Silas Heap. Expert fisher. Lives in the forest with Erik, Edd, Jo-Jo, and the Witches.
- Erik Heap: Third son of Sarah and Silas Heap, twin of Edd. Lives in the forest with Sam, Edd, Jo-Jo, and the Witches.
- Edd Heap: Fourth son of Sarah and Silas Heap, twin of Erik. Lives in the forest with Sam, Erik, Jo-Jo, and the Witches.
- Jo-Jo Heap: Fifth son of Sarah and Silas Heap. Lives in the forest with Sam, Erik, Edd, and the Witches.
- Nicko Heap: Sixth son of Sarah and Silas Heap. Good at sailing.
- Jenna Heap: She is the Princess, but was raised by the Heaps who were for several months unaware of who she was.
- Merrin Meredith: He became DomDaniel's apprentice who claims to have rescued him from a poor disgraceful family. He was thought to be Septimus Heap until the end of Book 1.
- Stanley (or Rat 101): The Long-Distance Confidential Message Rat who was fired and later became a Secret Rat who will soon get fired from that job and start the long-distance confidential message rats place again.
- DomDaniel: The Necromancer and ex-ExtraOrdinary Wizard.
- Alther Mella: The ghost of the old ExtraOrdinary Wizard, who aids Jenna and Septimus and who Silas Heap and Marcia Overstrand were apprenticed to.
- Galen: Sarah Heap's friend in the woods who is a garden witch. She taught Sarah about herbs and plants. When Sarah was younger she met Silas Heap in the forest near Galen's treehouse.
- Maxie: Full name Maximillan, this faithful Abyssinian wolfhound that belongs to the Heaps has no real part in the book, but he makes Marcia go crazy, mostly at Aunt Zelda's cottage, and believes that Silas is top dog.
- Sally Mullin: Sally Mullin runs a Tea and Ale House by the river near The Castle. She helps the others escape from the Hunter by her small boat led under his chin.
- Boy 412: An expendable army boy, revealed at the end to be Septimus Heap.
- Boggart: Aunt Zelda's friend who keeps away brownies. He helps escort Jenna and the others to Aunt Zelda's cottage.

== Critical reception ==
Critical reception for Magyk has been positive, with the New York Post recommending it for fans of the Harry Potter series. The Times gave a positive review, calling the book a "real discovery". Magyk also received positive reviews from the School Library Journal, Horn Book Guide, and Booklist.

== Film adaptation ==
Warner Bros. bought the rights to produce a film adaptation of the book in 2007. Karen Rosenfelt will produce the film, with Sage also serving as an executive producer. It was announced on 17 July 2009, that the film Septimus Heap: Magyk will not be animated but live action with computer effects, with David Frankel to direct.
