= Sword Quest =

2008 children's adventure novel by Nancy Yi Fan

- First edition
- Author: Nancy Yi Fan
- Illustrator: Jo-anne Rioux
- Cover artist: Mark Zug
- Language: English
- Genre: Children's Adventure/Fantasy Novel
- Publisher: HarperCollins
- Publication date: January 22, 2008
- Publication place: United States
- Media type: Print (Hardcover)
- Pages: 272 pgs.
- ISBN: 978-0061243356
- Preceded by: Swordbird
- Followed by: Sword Mountain

Sword Quest is a 2008 children's adventure novel by Nancy Yi Fan. It is a prequel to Swordbird which was published in February 2007.

== Plot ==
There is war in the kingdom of birds, which was started by the prehistoric birds known as the archaeopteryxes. In the only place where birds are still safe, a magical island called Kauria, the King, Pepheroh the Phoenix, orders his birds to make a sword as a result of what the Great Spirit tells him. Once the sword had been forged, a tear gem from the Great Spirit, a godly entity watching over birds, lands in the hilt of the sword, and seven other gems, each a color of the rainbow, are scattered around the world. These gems are the Leasorn Gems, and hold clues to where the magical kingdom of Kauria and the sword are found. A bird destined to be a hero will take hold of the sword at the fifth full moon three years from then and rescue the warring world. However, should the sword fall into evil hands, the world of birdkind shall be in peril.

Hungrias the Second, Ancient Wing (or king) of the archaeopteryxes, sends Sir Maldeor, his top knights, and his son, Prince Phaethon, to a tribe of doves, who have the orange Leasorn Gem. The mission fails, as a monstrous four-winged bird/reptile creature attacks and eats Phaethon, who was in possession of the orange gem. The creature bursts into blue flames and Maldeor sends his troops to kill all the remaining doves. However, a dove named Irene manages to escape and lays an egg. When the egg hatches to reveal a fully feathered hatchling, she names him Wind-Voice. Meanwhile, the four-winged creature, named Yin Soul, is stuck between the world of the living and that of the dead, and can only escape if he can find the body of a likely hero that can get the Hero Sword, or else he will die a painful death. Yin Soul attempts to take control of Wind-Voice, but Wind-Voice sees through Yin Soul's illusion and refuses. Before meeting Yin Soul, it was revealed that Wind-Voice's mother had been killed, and he was made a slave. Wind-Voice later meets a wood-pecker scribe named Ewingerale, nicknamed Winger. Winger had been imprisoned after his tribe was destroyed. The archaeptyx were planning on fattening Winger up and eating him for supper.

Wind-Voice breaks Winger out, is attacked by an archaeopteryx guard, and is brought to Hungrias, where he is put over a spit to cook for supper. On the spit, after he faints from the heat and is brought to Yin Soul's realm, Wind-Voice escapes and meets Fisher, a battle scarred crane, in a tribe in the surrounding swamp, as well as Winger. Fisher begins to teach Wind-Voice how to fight with a sword and later tells him of the Leasorn Gems. Wind-Voice is determined to find the gems and finding the hero, who will bring peace to the world. Before leaving to find the gems, Fisher gives them a map to finding Fleydur, who will help them on their journey. Also coming along is Stormac; a myna who can't resist his temptation for riches. Wind-Voice, Winger, and Stormac meet a golden eagle, who is revealed to be Fleydur. The group head out into the desert and battle a group of an archaeopteryx, who are in possession of the red Leasorn. Winger and Fleydur manage to escape with the gem, but Stormac is mortally wounded and is later found by a group of parrots, who heal him with the use of there green leasorn. Wind-Voice has been captured and taken to the castle of the archaeopteryx, where Maldeor is the new emperor.

Maldeor is revealed to be Yin Soul's apprentice and had wing chopped off and then exiled by Hungrias for losing Prince Phaethon. After nearly dying in a blizzard, Yin Soul summons Maldeor and gives him a new, bat like wing. But the wing needs a potion every new moon to keep it going. Maldeor goes to Hungrias, takes the throne and then kills him. Maldeor throws Wind-Voice in the dungeon and later attempts to have him executed by tying him to a log and throwing him off a waterfall. Wind-Voice survives and meets up with Stormac, who now has the green Learson gem. The two go to Sword Mountain and gain the purple gem. Meanwhile, Winger and Fleydur are heading over the ocean the land of the penguins in search of the teal Learson. Along the way Fleydur reveals that he is actually a prince exiled from his home of Sword Mountain because of his belief that music can bring joy and healing to the world. Wind-Voice and Stormac are also heading over the ocean and end up in the Island of the Pirates, where they find the blue Learson gem and on Byrdsfish Island; the seagull tribe. Stormac is attacked and killed by a group of pirates led by Captain Rag-Foot and Wind-Voice heads alone to Kauria. Yin Soul attempts to take control of Maldeor but is rebuffed and left to die. Later Maldeor launches an attack for Kauria, but ends up in the land of the penguins and most of the forces are defeated or killed.

Maldeor and his remaining army head to Kauria, where he sees a recently reunited Wind-Voice, Winger, and Fleydur. An army of free birds arrive to battle against the archaeptyx forces. Wind-Voice and Maldeor both head to the island and the two begin to battle. Wind-Voice escapes from the fight and manages to find the Hero's Sword, but doesn't take it. Maldeor however has taken a false Hero's Sword and attacks Wind-Voice. The real Hero's Sword appearance in Wind-Voices claws and Maldeor is killed when the temple that they are in begins to fall apart. The archaeopteryx army leave and begin to form their own tribes and Fleydur is taken back into his family. Wind-Voice is renamed Swordbird by King Pepheroh and it is revealed that Wind-Voice's father is the Great Spirit. The clues on the Leasorn Gems disappear and the day that Wind-Voice became Swordbird is made a holiday called the Bright Moon Festival. Swordbird reveals to Winger in a dream that he too was killed by the rubble and that he is now a spirit and a guardian of peace, and will help any that summon him.

== Reviews ==
The book has received mostly positive reviews, Laura Ruttig, Children's Literature said "Birds form the unusual topic of this quest novel, which begins with a prophecy that foretells the coming of a great hero. The archaeopteryxes’ dark empire is growing, and they have turned even the strongest species of birds, such as the crows, into slaves. 013-Unidentified, a strange white bird, is held in their captivity at the start of the book. As he struggles to free a fellow prisoner, he suddenly recalls the name his mother gave him, Wind-Voice. He escapes and grows strong again, reclaiming his true identity as Wind-Voice. Throughout the novel, he journeys across the land to stop the evil Maldeor from reaching the Hero's Sword. This is a novel about recognizing the hero within and understanding what is truly important in life—such as family, friends, and peace, rather than power or treasure. Yi Fan's writing is outstanding given her young age. I also loved Rioux's exceptional pencil-drawn illustrations, which bring charming life to the characters. Together, they make this book an entertaining flight of the imagination." Robyn Gioia, School Library Journal said "In this good-versus-evil story, a prequel to Swordbird (HarperCollins, 2007), readers see a legend taking shape as evil forces attempt to conquer the inhabitants of a bird world. Prophecy says a hero will emerge on Hero's Day, but no one knows who it will be. Scattered in unknown regions of the world lay strategically placed Leasorn gems that hold clues to where the hero's sword waits. It is up to the hero to discover where and to retrieve it. The archaeopteryxes, an army of birds intent on cruelty and destruction, support the desires of the villainous leaders. Maldeor, a leader with a batlike wing forged from evil magic, has cast his eye toward claiming the sword. But unlikely birds lay down their lives to uncover the clues so they might save the sword for its true master. Fleydur, eagle prince of the Skythunder tribe, Stormac the mynah, and Ewingerale the woodpecker all play pivotal roles as companions to 013-Unidentified, a dovelike bird trapped as a slave. Readers will find the characters credible and well suited for their roles in this fabled adventure. The tightly crafted story line is nicely executed, but the most important element, and one that truly touches the heart, is the underlying theme of love." and by Sarah Sawtelle, Kidsreads said "SWORD QUEST is a thrilling adventure brimming with equal amounts of suspense and hope. Nancy Yi Fan’s prose and creativity take flight in this exciting prequel to the 2007 bestseller SWORDBIRD. We hope that this is just the beginning of a long and fruitful career for this talented teenage author."

Other critics noticed that it is better than her last novel, but say that the dialog is acquired, and that the story drags and stumbles along at a terrible pace.
