= Septimus Heap (character) =

- Septimus Heap character
- Septimus Heap, as illustrated by Mark Zug
- First appearance: Magyk
- Created by: Angie Sage

In-universe information
- Alias: Boy 412
- Nickname: Sep (by Jenna)
- Title: The ExtraOrdinary Apprentice
- Occupation: Apprentice to the ExtraOrdinary Wizard, soon to be 777th ExtraOrdinary Wizard
- Family: The Heaps
- Relatives: Silas Heap (father); Sarah Heap (mother); Jenna Heap (adoptive sister); Nicko Heap (brother); Jo-Jo Heap (brother); Edd Heap (brother); Erik Heap (brother); Sam Heap (brother); Simon Heap (brother); Zelda Zanuba Heap (great-aunt); Grandpa Benji (grandfather); Edmund Heap (uncle); Ernold Heap (uncle)

Septimus Heap is the protagonist in the bestselling book series Septimus Heap, by Angie Sage. He is the Apprentice to the ExtraOrdinary Wizard, Marcia Overstrand. He was once a member of the Young Army, known as Boy 412.

== Description ==
Septimus is a small and timid-looking boy, with green wizard eyes and curly blond hair, formerly wearing a sheepskin jacket with purple and yellow stripes, and red hat during his Young Army days. Now he wears the traditional green robes of the ExtraOrdinary apprentice to Marcia and a pair of brown boots. He was very thin when he was in the Young Army. Later he filled up more due to Aunt Zelda's cabbage sandwiches in Magyk.

== Development ==
According to author Angie Sage, the character was in her mind for a long time, and she had already decided what would happen to Septimus in the end but was not exactly sure how she would make the character get there or who he would meet on his journey. For her, Septimus was someone who was in a strange and hostile world and who did not have a clue about who he really was.

== In the story ==
=== Before meeting the Heaps ===
At twelve hours old, Septimus was taken away from his mother Sarah Heap by the Matron Midwife on the commands of the evil Necromancer, DomDaniel. It was planned for him to be raised to become apprentice to DomDaniel. However, due to a mix -up, the midwife's own son was taken. Septimus was raised in the Young Army, known as Boy 412, up until the end of Magyk.

=== After meeting his family ===
In the very first book Magyk after Septimus was taken away, Silas and Sarah later adopt the orphaned princess of their Castle. When Jenna, the princess, is discovered, the ExtraOrdinary wizard Marcia Overstrand takes her away from the Heaps and circumstance had it that Boy 412 ended up escaping with them to Silas Heap's Aunt; Aunt Zelda's place. There the others discover Boy 412's magical powers and he, together with Jenna and their brother Nicko discover a hidden Dragon-Boat and save Marcia from DomDaniel. Marcia accepts Boy 412 as her apprentice, and for a return gift, Aunt Zelda reveals him to be Septimus Heap.

The second book Flyte finds Septimus as the apprentice to Marcia. His elder brother Simon kidnaps Jenna in envy of Septimus stealing his apprenticeship. Septimus along with Nicko goes out in search of Jenna and they are accompanied by his Young Army friend Boy 409 or better known as Wolf-Boy. They find Jenna in the Port and take the Dragon-Boat from Aunt Zelda's to fight Simon who damages the Dragon-Boat extensively. Septimus saves Marcia again from a placement by Simon. He found the long-lost flyte charm.

The third book Physik finds Septimus in great danger as the ghost of an evil Queen Etheldredda sends him back in time 500 years ago. There Septimus becomes the apprentice to a noted alchemist called Marcellus Pye and learns about physik. Jenna and Nicko along with a new girl called Snorri, rescue him and Marcia destroys the evil queen. Septimus cures the people of the Castle from the sicknesse which was spreading.

In Queste, Septimus is tricked to go on a deadly quest by an old and nasty ghost called Tertius Fume. He eventually goes on to the House of Foryx to search Nicko and Snorri who were trapped back in time in the previous book. Along with Jenna and Beetle, his friend, they search and bring back Nicko and Snorri. His magical power development is noticeable.

"Syren" sees Septimus promoted to Senior Apprentice as he was the only ExtraOrdinary Apprentice to have survived - much less completed - the Queste. With his newfound freedom he sets off to find Jenna, Nicko, Beetle and Snorri (who were still at the Trading Post) on Spit Fyre, to discover them tucked away safely on Jenna's father's (Milo Banda) ship: the Cerys. Events lead to Septimus, Jenna, Beetle and an injured Spit Fyre becoming stranded on a beautiful island and meeting Syrah Syara - a 513-year-old girl possessed by the Syren. Eventually Syrah is freed from the Syren and the friends all sail home together on the Cerys.

== Character Speciality ==
=== Magykal Power ===
Septimus is the seventh son of a seventh son (Silas Heap). Therefore, he is gifted with extreme magical powers. When Marcia gives him a charm to be invisible in Magyk, he was the first to disappear without even uttering the charm. This made Marcia realize that he had extreme magical powers. She asked him to be her apprentice which he later accepted.

The Dragon-Boat also realised this magical power when Septimus held the Dragon's tiller. When Jenna, Nicko and he went to find Marcia aboard The Vengeance, he showed his magical skill by being clever enough to utter new spells so that all three of them can see each other even if they are invisible. He can transfix (paralyse) bigger beings like horses as well as unreal things like shadows as demonstrated in Flyte. He was the first one to discover the complete Flyte charm in many years and is able to fly successfully. When he went back in time to Marcellus Pye, he learnt all that he could about alchemy and "Physik" and was even able to cure the sicknesse which infected the Castle inhabitants. He is also able to do a complete Projection of a human and keep it relatively solid as he demonstrated in the House of Foryx in Queste, where in the beginning of the book he was able to conjure sound, which many ExtraOrdinary cannot do.

=== Relationships, likes and dislikes ===
Septimus is a loving and caring boy, fond of his adopted sister Jenna, brother Nicko, friends Beetle and Wolf Boy (Boy 409), tutor Marcia and pet dragon Spit Fyre. His relationship with his elder brother Simon is ruined in Flyte when Simon tried to kidnap Jenna and kill Marcia, but maintains a healthy relationship with the other Heap brothers and is closest to Nicko Heap. His relationship with Simon is later repaired when he turns away from Darke in Fyre. He rarely spends time around the Forest Heaps: Sam, Jo-Jo, Edd and Erik Heap, as they live in the Forest most of the time, but he is still close to them, as proved in Queste. Although he spends most of his time at Wizard Tower, he loves it when he gets a chance to meet Sarah and Silas and roam around the Castle with Jenna as is evident in Flyte. Septimus loves catching bugs and has vertigo which he faces, many times in the series like when he walks along Snake Slipway in Physik or going along the toll bridge to the House of Foryx in Queste. He likes having FizzFroot with his friend Beetle but hates it when he has to go on a sled ride with him under the Manuscriptorium's Ice Tunnels. He is also good friends with Wolf Boy, also known as Boy 409, as they were friends in their Young Army days. It is possible that when he was Boy 412 he had a slight crush on Jenna, as when he would be embarrassed when he had to dress silly in front of her and he would care for her more than any other person, but whether or not he still has it is still unknown. He does, however, seem to develop a more prominent crush on Syrah Syara, an ExtraOrdinary Wizard apprentice 500 years past who was lost to the Queste. Whether or not she returns his affections is unclear - she did indeed smile at him when he took her hand, but that may be because he was some of the first human contact she had had in 500 years. In Fyre, he and Rose are heavily implied to have a mutual crush on each other, which is most likely due to Septimus regularly visiting the infirmary to visit Syrah. Syrah is said to have forgotten about the events of Syren, but does get an unsteady feeling when looking at Septimus.

=== Possessions ===
Septimus wears an ExtraOrdinary apprentice belt around his waist in which he keeps all his small charms including the Flyte charm. He wears the Dragon ring of Hotep-Ra around his finger. He still has his Young Army Camp back pack and keeps an interesting collection of stuff from his Young Army days which can be handy and useful at any time. His backpack is ruined by a pack of wolverines in the forest when he goes out in search of Jenna in Flyte. He had a green rock that Jenna gave him in Magyk, but it hatched into Spit Fyre.

== Reception ==
The character was widely accepted as being extremely impressive and a well-written standalone. Manila Standard said that his character comes off as an intriguing boy, who is taught early on to live cautiously (in his Young Army days), yet he longs for the love and affection of a family.

Sabina Qazi of Dawn.com said that sometimes Sage has given too much attention to the secondary characters and that takes away the heroism of the protagonist Septimus. Also, the ease with which they dispatch their enemy, takes away his glory a little but also "this very element, makes for light and humorous reading and renders the children more identifiable." She also said that Septimus was quite identifiable when compared with real world and comes off like the most intelligent but quiet boy in class whom we see at every school.
