= Aunt Zelda =

Aunt Zelda may refer to:

- Zelda Zanuba Heap, a character from Septimus Heap
- Zelda Spellman, a character from Sabrina the Teenage Witch
