= The Alabaster Staff =

2003 novel by Edward Bolme

- Paperback edition cover
- Author: Edward Bolme
- Cover artist: Mark Zug
- Language: English
- Series: The Rogues
- Genre: Fantasy
- Publisher: Wizards of the Coast
- Publication date: July 2003
- Publication place: United States
- Media type: Print (paperback)
- Pages: 320 (paperback edition)
- ISBN: 0-7869-2962-6
- OCLC: 52886382
- LC Class: CPB Box no. 2278 vol. 5
- Followed by: The Black Bouquet

The Alabaster Staff is a fantasy novel by Edward Bolme, set in the Forgotten Realms fictional universe. It is the first novel in "The Rogues" series.

== Plot summary ==
A young street performer is drawn into a twisting plot of double-crossings and betrayals, at the center of which is the artifact of great power known as the Alabaster Staff.

== Reception ==
In a moderately positive review, critic Don D'Ammassa wrote that the main character "is a reasonably well developed character and her exploits are fast paced and enthusiastically described."

== Publication history ==
- 2003, USA, Wizards of the Coast ISBN 0-7869-2962-6, Pub date 1 July 2003, Paperback.
