= Swordbird =

2007 novel by Nancy Yi Fan

- Author: Nancy Yi Fan
- Illustrator: Mark Zug
- Cover artist: Mark Zug
- Language: English
- Genre: Children's Fantasy novel
- Published: February 2007; HarperCollins Children's Books
- Publication place: United States
- Media type: Print (hardback)
- ISBN: 978-0061131004
- OCLC: 70877706
- LC Class: PZ7.F19876 Swo 2007
- Preceded by: Sword Quest (2008)
- Followed by: Sword Mountain (2012)

Swordbird is a children's fantasy novel written by Nancy Yi Fan. A prequel, Sword Quest, was released January 22, 2008. A sequel, Sword Mountain, based on Sword Mountain, home of an eagle tribe mentioned in Sword Quest, was published in early 2012.

== Plot ==
The story starts with Turnatt, an evil tyrant hawk and lord of Fortress Glooming, watching the construction of his fortress. Further in the forest of Stone-Run are two tribes: the Bluewingle tribe of the blue jays and the Sunrise tribe of the cardinals, which are both at war, each accusing the other of stealing their eggs and food, not knowing that this is actually the work of Turnatt.

A member of the Bluewingle tribe, a female blue jay named Aska, meets a robin named Miltin, a slave at Fortress Glooming, who warns her of Turnatt. Aska leaves and tells the two tribes of Turnatt.

The groups make amends in time for the Bright Moon Festival, during which the Flying Willowleaf Theater arrive and help celebrate by telling the legend of Swordbird, a giant dove-like bird of peace with magical powers. The celebration is cut short when a group of Turnatt's soldiers attack, attempting to capture and enslave the two tribes and the members of the Flying Willowleaf Theater.

The tribes manage to thwart the soldiers and decide to summon Swordbird, thinking that he is the only one with the power to defeat Turnatt, using his Leasorn Sword. The sole problem is that Swordbird can only be summoned by a song and one of the Leasorn Gems, which are said to be crystallized tears of the Great Spirit. There are only seven Leasorn Gems in the world, with an eighth one in Swordbird's blade. All hope seems lost until a recently escaped Miltin tells them that his tribe has one of the Leasorn Gems. The tribes decide to send Aska and Miltin over the White Cap Mountains to reach Miltin's home, the Waterthorn tribe.

While Miltin and Aska are away, Turnatt sends his raven spy, Shadow, to destroy the two villages. Shadow and his group manage to set the Bluewingle tribe's home ablaze. The Bluewingle tribe take refuge with the Sunrise tribe. Shadow and his group attempt to light the Sunrise village on fire too, but are attacked by the tribe members and scattered.

At the White Cap Mountains, Aska and Miltin are attacked by a group of Slarkills and Miltin is mortally wounded and slowly dying. The two make it to the Waterthorn tribe where Miltin dies and Aska convinces them to aid her tribes against Turnatt. The Winterhorn tribe arrives in time to help the Sunrise and Bluewingle tribes and the members of the Flying Willowleaf Theater in their battle against Turnatt and his attacking army.

Aska manages to summon Swordbird, who quickly kills Turnatt. With their leader dead, Turnatt's army leave and the birds of Stone-Run release all those enslaved in Fortress Glooming. Two years later, Aska is married to Cody, an old friend of hers, the Sunrise and Bluewingle tribe have formed together as the Stone-Run Forest tribe, and Fortress Glooming has been made into the Stone-Run Library. The story ends with Cody and Aska visiting the grave of Miltin and leaving one of Swordbird's feathers.

== Awards and reviews ==
Swordbird, a New York Times bestseller, was nominated for the Book Sense Children's Picks List for spring 2007.
