= Syren (novel) =

2009 novel by Angie Sage

- Cover art for Syren by Mark Zug
- Author: Angie Sage
- Cover artist: Mark Zug (illustrator)
- Language: English
- Series: Septimus Heap (book 5)
- Genre: Fantasy novel
- Publisher: HarperCollins and Bloomsbury Publishing
- Publication date: September 29, 2009
- Publication place: England
- Media type: Print (Hardback & Paperback)
- Pages: 640
- ISBN: 978-0-06-088210-5
- Preceded by: Queste
- Followed by: Darke

Syren is the fifth book in the child fantasy Septimus Heap series by Angie Sage. It was released on September 29, 2009, by HarperCollins and Bloomsbury Publishing. Sage went on a book promotion tour for Syren as well as a contest to promote it further.

The story continues from the previous release Queste and deals with Septimus going to pick up his friends from a distant land. While coming back they are trapped in an island and there they learn of an evil plan to destroy their homeland, The Castle. The rest of the story deals with how Septimus and his friends save their home and destroy the evil coming their way. The book cover depicts Aunt Zelda’s live SafeCharm lying on Syrah’s book.

== Development ==
Angie Sage had compared book five to Robinson Crusoe with "tentacles— lots of them". Commenting on the book, she says:

I've planned the ending, and I'm already just drawing everything in, so with number seven, I can pretty much think what's going to happen. But on the other hand, there's always the unknown. I write in the character's shoes, so I'm never entirely sure what they're going to do.

== Synopsis ==
This story picks up where Queste ended. Jenna, Nicko, Snorri, Ullr and Beetle are in the small harbor known as the Trading Post, where Jenna encounters her father, Milo Banda, who persuades them to spend the night on his ship. Back in The Castle, Septimus gets a promotion to Senior Apprentice by Marcia Overstrand, for being the only apprentice wizard to complete the Queste. This enables him to head off on an adventure of his own. His escapade begins as he plans a simple flight on board his dragon, Spit Fyre, to retrieve his friends from the Trading Post.

Around this time, Aunt Zelda sends Wolf Boy from the Marram Marshes. She is giving him a challenging test for becoming the first male Keeper. As soon as Wolf Boy leaves, Zelda retrieves a SafeCharm, which appears to be a tiny, pear-shaped gold bottle. She needs to deliver it to Septimus, however, by the time she arrives he has already left. Due to an unfortunate mix-up, the SafeCharm falls into the hands of Merrin Meredith who stole it believing it to be a rare perfume. When he takes the top off to sniff it, a jinnie comes out of it. "Jim Knee" as he is called by Merrin, sets off on his own adventure. Meanwhile, Wolf Boy bumps into Simon Heap in the Port; he was looking for his fiancée Lucy Gringe who had been missing. Wolf Boy approaches the House of the Port Witch Coven. There he reads Zelda's letter which tells him to feed a creature called Grim and cut-off its tentacle tip. The Port Witch takes him inside her kitchen and wakes the Grim, which is a giant octopus. The witches bring forth a captive Lucy to feed to the Grim. Under the pretense of feeding Lucy to the Grim, Wolf Boy and Lucy escape from the coven. They are chased by a senior witch, Linda, but they escape by running straight onto a leaving ship.

While flying towards the Trading Post, Septimus sees a bunch of seven islands on the sea and hears a voice calling him. Ignoring the voice, Septimus continues his journey and reaches Milo's ship The Cerys. There Milo shows Jenna a big trunk which is full of tiny lead tubes and which he declares to be brought specially for Jenna's safety. Jenna, getting tired of Milo's hospitality, decides to leave the ship and fly off home with Septimus and Beetle on Spit Fyre. But while flying home, they get caught in a raging storm. They try to find the Cattrokk Light, a lighthouse in the middle of the ocean, and fall onto a nearby island when Spit Fyre's tail gets struck by lightning. Septimus tries his best to cure the tail with Physik but his attempts fail. He is also perplexed by a voice calling his name continuously. One day Septimus sees a girl approaching him. The girl introduces herself as Syrah Syara; Septimus remembers meeting her when he went back in time 500 years, during the events from Physik. She fled from The Castle during the Queste and hid on the island. Syrah heals Spit Fyre's tail and reveals that she is under a terrible enchantment by the resident evil ghost of the island known as Syren. The Syren, a singing ghost who attracts sailors by her voice and leads them to their doom by possessing them, stays in a tower atop the hills of the island. Syrah takes Septimus there to show him an opened ice-tunnel latch beneath the island; she mentions that danger is approaching the Castle. Before Septimus can close the ice-tunnel, the Syren takes hold of Syrah while Septimus flees.

Meanwhile, Marcia goes to the Manuscriptorium vaults and finds that the ice tunnel latches, which pass from The Castle to the Seven Isles of Syren, through Cattrokk Light to the House of Foryx, are opened. Suspecting that the evil ghost Tertius Fume may be behind this, she returns to the Wizard Tower to find Zelda who informs Marcia about Septimus' danger. Together they find the jinnie and lock him in a sealed chamber in the Wizard Tower and devises a plan to help Septimus. Lucy and Wolf Boy continue their journey aboard the ship whose captain is a pirate. They reach Cattrokk light and there, the pirate's henchmen throw the lighthouse guard overboard. Lucy and Wolf Boy hide from them in one of the rooms of the Lighthouse. Surprisingly, they find that the lighthouse guard, Miarr, who is half-cat half-human, is still alive because cats have nine lives. The ship's captain and his henchmen take the light from the lighthouse and transport it to the island where Jenna and Beetle reside, and they see them coming. Miarr then leads Lucy and Wolf Boy to an underwater machine which allows them to approach the island unseen.

The Cerys travels towards The Castle under Nicko's steering. However, near Cattrokk Light, Nicko hears the Syren's song and believing mistakenly that the light on the island is coming from the lighthouse, he sails the ship onto the rocks. The pirate ship's captain and his henchmen then ambush Cerys' passengers, but Septimus and the others are able to lock them in the hold and save them all on board. The captain and his henchmen open the trunk, which contains thousands of bottles of jinnie and release them. To their horror, Septimus and the others find that the jinnie warriors come on board and address Tertius Fume as their master; he is on the island directing them towards the Syren tower ice tunnel. Meanwhile, under Marcia's order, Septimus' jinnie finds him. Septimus and Beetle come to the conclusion that since Jim Knee was in a golden bottle, he has the power to overcome the warrior jinnie because gold is purer than lead. Septimus orders Jim Knee to go and freeze one of the warriors so that all the others will be simultaneously frozen. The front line of warriors had already reached through the ice-tunnel to the Wizard Tower, where just as they are about to kill Marcia under Fume's supervision, Jim Knee freezes the last jinnie; hence freezing all the other jinnie warriors. Marcia triumphs and informs a surprised Fume that she will see to it that his ghost is eradicated forever. Septimus and the others rejoice and Lucy and Wolf Boy help Miarr to put back the light atop Cattrokk. Septimus also orders Jim Knee to go and capture the Syren and force it into a small sealed bottle; hence Syrah is saved from her terrible enchantment. However, learning that more than 500 years have been passed since she arrived there and that Julius Pike is long dead, Syrah enters a magical coma because of the combined effects of her recent dis-enchantment and the stress and sadness of this news. The whole company returns to The Castle, where Marcia, Sarah and Silas Heap and Aunt Zelda meet them.

== Reception ==
Critical reception for the book was mostly positive, with Nannette Morges from the Wilton Villager commended the maturity of the characters.
