= Septimus Heap =

Series of fantasy novels

Septimus Heap series
- The cover art for all seven main titles in the series
- Magyk; Flyte; Physik; Queste; Syren; Darke; Fyre
- Author: Angie Sage
- Illustrator: Mark Zug
- Country: United Kingdom
- Genre: Juvenile fantasy
- Publisher: Bloomsbury Publishing (UK); Katherine Tegen Books (US)
- Published: 23 September 2005 – 16 April 2013
- Media type: Print (hardback & paperback)

Septimus Heap is a series of children's fantasy novels featuring a protagonist of the same name; the series is written by English author Angie Sage. It features seven novels, entitled Magyk, Flyte, Physik, Queste, Syren, Darke, and Fyre. The first, Magyk, was published in 2005 and the last, Fyre, in 2013. A full colour supplement to the series, entitled The Magykal Papers, was published in June 2009, and an online novella titled The Darke Toad is also available. A sequel trilogy, The TodHunter Moon Series, set seven years after the events of Fyre, began in October 2014.

The series follows the adventures of Septimus Heap who, as a seventh son of a seventh son, has extraordinary magical powers. After he becomes an apprentice to the ("ExtraOrdinary") wizard of the series, Marcia Overstrand, he must study for seven years and a day until his apprenticeship ends. In the first book, he is known as Young Army Expendable Boy 412, until his great-aunt, Zelda Zanuba Heap reveals his true identity. His adventures are placed in the context of the warmth and strength of his family, and developed alongside those of Jenna, his adoptive sister, who is heir to the throne of the Castle, the community where they live. The novels, set in an elaborate fantastic world, describes the many challenges that Septimus and his friends must overcome.

The books have appeared on national bestsellers lists and received worldwide critical acclaim; Warner Bros. acquired the rights to produce a movie based on the first book. It has been compared with Harry Potter, and other works within the genre.

== Development ==
Author Angie Sage has said that the character of Septimus Heap, his ultimate fate, and the world he inhabits, were fully formed in her imagination from the beginning, but she had not decided on the intermediate steps on his journey, nor on the characters he would meet. Sage described Septimus Heap's world as a place where numerous creatures and people suddenly appear and become involved in events. Commenting on the development of the Septimus Heap character, Sage has described him as someone in a strange and hostile world who has no idea of his real identity. The series gained momentum with the development of the character of Marcia Overstrand, which Sage credits as an inspiration. Septimus Heap is centered on the warmth and strength of the Heap family. In an interview Sage said:

I like their chaotic acceptance of life, and the fact that they don't do what they are told by authority if they think it is wrong. Stuff happens to them that makes their life difficult at times but they don't moan about things, they just get on and sort it out as best they can. They are remarkably accepting of other people, I think because they are so strong as a unit. They are also a family which becomes separated by circumstances- and I wanted to show that families can still be close to each other and care for each other even though they live apart. The family relationships develop as the books progress, and are central to the story.

Sage keeps a boat (called Muriel) in real life, as does the character Sally Mullin in Magyk. Other inspirations for the series included Sage's love of history and the misty landscape of Cornwall, where she lived before starting the series. Another factor in the development of the series was her love of daydreaming: "Slowly ... lots of thinking, and daydreaming. I am a big fan of daydreaming and staring out of the window. Then keeping all my thoughts and ideas in a dog-eared old envelope for ages." With The Wilton Villager, Sage further expanded her inspiration behind the series. "It was an idea I had had for a very long time, and I waited a long time while it grew and developed. [...] I try and write the books I would have loved to have read as a child and teenager. [...] It all started with the spelling of the first title, 'Magyk.' I felt the way that magic is normally spelled makes people think of conjuring tricks and stage magicians and I wanted to avoid that, but in the past, before spelling became standardized, people would spell words how they chose to, sometimes in different ways in the same sentence. Magic was often spelled magyck, so all I did was to change that a little. After that I carried on using archaic spelling for words associated with magic and the supernatural. It makes them look a little different, gives a different flavor to them."

== The series and related books ==
=== Septimus Heap Heptalogy ===
The plot of the first book, entitled Magyk (published in March 2005), revolves around the pauper Heap family: Silas, Sarah and their seven children. The story begins when Silas finds Jenna in the snow. Septimus is born on the same day, but is declared dead by the midwife, who steals the baby and brings him to DomDaniel, an evil wizard. However, he is confused with the midwife's own son and is sent to the Supreme Custodian to help start a boy army. On her tenth birthday, Jenna learns from ExtraOrdinary Wizard Marcia Overstrand that she is a princess, but that she—and the Heap family—are in danger. Jenna and Nicko Heap escape to their Aunt Zelda's cottage. They are accompanied by a member of the Young Army called Boy 412, who discovers his magic powers and a legendary ring while at Zelda's. Marcia is imprisoned in DomDaniel's boat, Vengeance, and nearly dies, but is rescued by Boy 412, Jenna and Nicko after they find a flying Dragon Boat in a secret cavern by Zelda's cottage where Jenna finds a beautiful stone. At the end of the novel, Boy 412 is revealed to be Septimus, and his family hears of his past.

The second book, Flyte (published in March 2006), begins with Septimus (now the apprentice to ExtraOrdinary Wizard Marcia Overstrand) witnessing the kidnapping of Jenna by her older brother Simon Heap. After seeking help from Nicko and a friend from the Young Army (boy 409/Wolf boy), Septimus finds Jenna at The Port, but they are followed by Simon. They fly to The Castle in the Dragon Boat, engaging in aerial combat with Simon on the way. Marcia's life is threatened by the reassembled bones of DomDaniel, but with Septimus's help, she destroys him. The novel also features the discovery of the lost Flyte charm, which gives the book its title, and the stone that Jenna gives to Septimus turns out to be an egg that hatches into a dragon who Septimus names Spit Fyre.

The antagonist of the third book, Physik (published in March 2007), is the 500-year-old spirit of Queen Etheldredda, who is accidentally released by Silas Heap. She sends Septimus to her immortal son Marcellus Pye. He is transported back in time to become the apprentice of the young Marcellus Pye, an alchemist who teaches him about Physik. In the present timeline of the novel, the Castle is infected by a deadly plague created by a rat like creature owned by Queen Etheldredda who has the plan to acquire eternal life. Jenna and Nicko meet a young trader, Snorri Snorrelssen with whom they travel in time to bring Septimus back though Nicko and Snorri couldn't escape. There, Jenna is taken to the living Queen Etheldredda as princess Esmerelda Queen Etheldredda's daughter who had disappeared, but she escapes with Septimus and they return to the present Castle. Marcia then destroys the substantial spirit of Etheldredda and Septimus brews an antidote to the plague (Sicknesse) using his knowledge of Physik. When Etheldredda is destroyed the true crown lost to Queen Etheldredda appears and is taken by Jenna for when she becomes queen.

The quest of the fourth book, Queste (published in April 2008), is a journey to the House of Foryx, in which "all times meet", to bring back Nicko and Snorri, who were trapped there after the events of the third book. Septimus is sent on the quest by a ghost called Tertius Fume. Tertius has made a promise to Merrin Meredith, who now holds the Two-Faced Ring, to Darken the Destiny of Septimus. Assisted by Jenna and his friend Beetle, among others, Septimus pieces together a map to the House of Foryx. When they reach the house, Septimus meets Hotep-Ra, the first ExtraOrdinary Wizard, while Jenna and Beetle find Nicko and Snorri. Marcia and Sarah Heap arrive outside the house on Spit Fyre, and they return together to their own time.

The fifth book, Syren (published in September 2009), continues from where Queste ended. Septimus brings his friends to the Port, a place beside the sea where ships come and go, and when he brings back his friends back he, Jenna and Beetle get trapped on a mysterious island. There he meets a mysterious girl called Syrah Syara who tells him that she is possessed by the Syren (hence the name of the book) an evil spirit, and she also tells him about a dangerous plot by Tertius Fume to destroy The Castle. Together with the help of the others and a safe-charm jinnee sent to him by Aunt Zelda, Septimus stops the invasion of The Castle by Fume and his jinnee warriors (stolen from Milo Banda, the dead queen's husband and Jenna's father) and saves Syrah from the Syren.

The sixth book, Darke (published in America in June 2011 and England in October 2011), sees Septimus and his friends battling the Darke domain which has engulfed the Castle and everything and everyone in it. The only thing that is standing in between is Merrin Meredith who created the darke domaine and his gang of Things and Darke Dragon. Alther Mella has been accidentally Banished by Marcia when she was trying to banish Tertius Fume (who, fortunately, was also banished) and Septimus wants to release him from the Darke Halls thinking he could help in undoing the Darke. When Marcia Overstrand, the ExtraOrdinary Wizard undoes the Darke spell with the help of the Paired Codes, all becomes well. Beetle becomes Chief Hermetic Scribe; Simon is reunited with his family after leaving his past behind and Princess Jenna is happy that the Palace and Castle are back to normal.

In Fyre (published in April 2013), Septimus nears the end of his ExtraOrdinary Wizard training. The Darke wizards in the Two-Faced Ring, Shamandrigger Saarn and Dramindonnor Naarn, escape and Inhabit Silas Heap's brothers Ernold and Edmund. They try to destroy Marcellus Pye's Alchemical Fyre but are defeated and returned to the Two-Faced Ring, which is then destroyed in the Fyre.

=== Spin-offs ===
Septimus Heap: The Magykal Papers (published in June 2009) is a supplement to the series in a full-colour larger format with illustrations by Mark Zug. Angie Sage said in an interview that she is enjoying the process of developing this guidebook and thinking about the book's structure and all its characters.

The Darke Toad is an eBook novella, published in February 2013. The novella features the return of DomDaniel as well as the Port Witch Coven, and is set between Magyk and Flyte. The eBook includes two chapters of Fyre, the final book in the series.

The TodHunter Moon trilogy starts seven years after Fyre, and revolves around Alice Todhunter Moon, the apprentice of Septimus, now ExtraOrdinary Wizard. First in the TodHunter Moon trilogy, Pathfinder (published in October 2014) picks up the world of Septimus Heap seven years after the events of Fyre, followed by SandRider (published in October 2015) and StarChaser (published in October 2016).

== Characters ==
The eponymous protagonist of the series is Septimus Heap. As the seventh son of a seventh son, the aptly named Septimus has exceptional magical powers. He shares his birthday with Jenna, his adoptive sister, but is presumed dead at birth by his family. For most of the first novel he appears as Boy 412, a child from the Young Army, where he has spent the first ten years of his life after DomDaniel attempted to abduct him. Thereafter he is apprentice to the ExtraOrdinary Wizard Marcia Overstrand. He has a mop of curly hair, wears green apprentice robes and has a Dragon Ring on his right hand. In the second novel, he acquires a dragon called Spit Fyre as a pet. According to a review in the Manila Standard Today, the contrast between the caution he has learned from an early age and his longing for the love and affection of a family makes him an intriguing character.

Adopted by the Heap family as a baby in place of Septimus, Jenna Heap is the daughter of the assassinated queen of the castle. She is a small girl, with deep violet eyes, dark hair (both of which all queens and princesses have had) and fair complexion; she wears a deep red cloak and the gold circlet of the princess on her head. She is portrayed as loving at heart, but sometimes stubborn. In the first novel she has a pet rock called Petroc Trelawney, which she loses when the Marram Marshes are flooded; she later acquires a pet duck called Ethel who becomes Sarah Heaps's pet. According to one critic, "The reader is ... left guessing whether or not she has it in her to rise to the tenets of her position as ruler of the Castle" because she is raised without knowledge of her royal origins.

Marcia Overstrand is a powerful, ambitious and wilful ExtraOrdinary Wizard. She is characterized as stern, bad-tempered and intimidating, but with a good heart beneath. Her affection towards her apprentice Septimus is manifest in the novels, as is the responsibility she feels to protect him and his sister, even with her own life. She is described as a tall woman, with long, dark curly hair and deep-green eyes, and generally wears a deep purple tunic with purple python-skin boots. She wears her Akhu-Amulet, which makes her ExtraOrdinary Wizard, as a necklace; it serves as her symbol. Her haughty and vain characterization has been praised as a "well-written stand-alone".

The main antagonist of the first two novels is DomDaniel, a Necromancer and ex-ExtraOrdinary Wizard who wants to regain control of the Wizard Tower from Marcia Overstrand. The antagonist of the third novel is Queen Etheldredda. In the fifth book the antagonists are the Syren and Tertius Fume and in the sixth book Merrin Merridith and his darke domaine. In the seventh it is the two Darke ring wizards. Several other characters appear regularly in the novels, including Septimus's parents Silas and Sarah Heap, Septimus's friend Beetle, and a trader called Snorri Snorrelssen.

== Fictional setting ==
The story contains hints that the series is set in the far future. For example, in Syren some characters discuss legends of lunar travel which correspond to the Apollo Moon missions. At the end of Fyre, Septimus writes in the snow that the date is 4 July 12,004. The book ends with a quote from Arthur C. Clarke: "Any Sufficiently Advanced Technology is Indistinguishable from Magyk."

=== Geographical inspirations ===
The Castle is the main location in the series. It is situated by a river on a piece of land, circular in shape, which has been cut off from the surrounding forest by an artificial moat. Sage based the structure on that of ancient walled cities which were completely self-sufficient, like little nations in their own right. The marshes south of the castle are based on boggy areas at the end of a creek near her home, and the tides and the phases of the moon in the novels are based on those for Falmouth, Cornwall. The forest to its northwest were inspired by medieval forests, which were huge and a law unto themselves, free from the authority of the outside world. The Port lies in the extreme south near the sea, inspired by the author's love of the hubbub accompanying the arrival of boats. According to Sage, she sees the Port as full of "beginnings and adventures—and endings too."

== Film adaptation ==
Warner Bros. bought the rights to produce a film version of the first book, Magyk. Karen Rosenfelt would produce the film, with Sage serving as an executive producer. According to Cinematical.com, the making of the movie would not start before the final Harry Potter movie was completed. Sage said that the screenplay would be developed after the writer's strike was over.

It was announced on 17 July 2009 that the movie would be live action, with computer-animated effects, and David Frankel as director and Rob Lieber to adapt Magyk. As of 2009, a re-write of the script was being done with screenwriter Mulroney while Warner Brothers were working with a studio to create some early conceptual design/look development. Sage commented: "It is very exciting to know that others are putting their creative input into my work."

In November 2019, the Septimus Heap official Facebook page stated that "Warner Brothers decided not to proceed with it, sadly. We then had to wait 8 years to get the rights back, which we managed to do in May. So now Septimus Heap is out there again, hoping to find a TV series."

== Reception ==
The Septimus Heap novels have been published in 28 languages worldwide and have sold over one million copies in the United States, with each of the books appearing on national bestsellers lists. Published in March 2005, the first book, Magyk, became an international bestseller after it appeared at number one on the New York Times Best Sellers List.

=== Critical reception ===
The Independent newspaper's review of the audio books stated that the chapters are short enough to keep children of seven-plus interested but, as there are ghosts, rats, soldiers and dragon boats to help Septimus and the young Princess fight the evil necromancer DomDaniel, there is enough to keep the whole family amused.

The series has also been compared to other fantasy novels: for instance, Hotep-Ra's magical ring evokes The Lord of the Rings, and the journeys in the series have been described as "somewhat Narnia-esque in how they play out"; similarly the concept of a remarkably powerful seventh son of a seventh son was previously employed in the Alvin Maker series of Orson Scott Card. The sprinkling of borrowed ideas has not necessarily been regarded as a negative trait: these ideas play a part in developing the flavour of the series and "don't necessarily deviate it from its originality".
