= Flyte =

2006 children's novel by Angie Sage

- Cover art for Flyte by Angie Sage
- Author: Angie Sage
- Cover artist: Mark Zug
- Language: English
- Series: Septimus Heap (Book 2)
- Genre: Fantasy novel
- Published: March 2006 HarperCollins and Bloomsbury Publishing
- Publication place: United Kingdom
- Media type: Print (Hardcover Paperback)
- Pages: 521 pp (Paperback)
- ISBN: 978-0-7475-8449-0 (UK Paperback)
- OCLC: 77796267
- Preceded by: Magyk
- Followed by: Physik

Flyte is a 2006 children's novel by Angie Sage and the second book in the Septimus Heap series. The book's cover was modelled after the in-story book: How to Survive Dragon Fostering: A Practykal Guide with the Flyte Charm lying on top. Flyte was released in March 2006 through HarperCollins and Bloomsbury Publishing.

== Plot ==
The book begins with a "fair haired" boy rowing a canoe to the place where Necromancer DomDaniel drowned, along with his ship. His skeleton climbs into the canoe, while the fair haired boy thinks about exacting his revenge on all the people who underestimated him. He thinks that they'll be sorry, especially when he becomes the ExtraOrdinary Wizard. The fair haired boy is later found out to be Simon Heap. Septimus Heap has become the apprentice to Marcia Overstrand, the ExtraOrdinary Wizard, and a year has gone by since the first book. Septimus's older brother, Simon, had run away after an argument between him and Sarah and Silas Heap about Septimus, who Simon dislikes. He comes back and kidnaps Jenna on his horse, Thunder. Septimus goes to search for her and he is assisted in his search by his brother Nicko, who helps build boats at Jannit Maarten's boatyard. They get lost in the Forest and meet their Grandpa Benji, who has transformed into a tree. Since the Forest is dangerous at nighttime, they spend the night in his branches. The next day they find "Camp Heap," where most of their brothers (Sam, Edd, Erik, and Jo-Jo) are staying. There, Septimus meets his old friend Boy 409 from the Young Army, who went missing before the events of Book 1. He is now called Wolf Boy. Meanwhile, Jenna runs away from Simon's Observatory in the Badlands and makes her way towards the Port. Eventually Septimus is able to rescue Jenna with his elder brother Nicko's help from the Port but they are tracked by Sleuth, Simon's tracking ball.

They make their way to the Marram Marshes where the green rock that Jenna gave Septimus at Aunt Zelda's cottage in the first book turns out to be the egg of a dragon and eventually hatches. Septimus absolutely adores the dragon and names him Spit Fyre. Later on, the dragon, based on the seeing-is-believing basis, identifies Marcia as his mother after she yells at him on the dragon launch pad. Septimus, Jenna, and Nicko take the Dragon Boat from Aunt Zelda's cottage and fly her to the Castle. However, they are pursued by Simon, who used a Flyte Charm to fly in the sky. Simon drops a huge Thunderflash on the Dragon-Boat's wing and it drops over Jannit Maarten's Boatyard. Septimus, Jenna, and Aunt Zelda are able to revive her through the Transubstantiation Triple spell.

Septimus rescues Marcia by identifying the Shadow that has been trailing her. He also finds out that the ShadowSafe Marcia is developing contains, unbeknownst to her, the bones of the dead Necromancer, DomDaniel, which, once reassembled, tries to kill Marcia. With Septimus's help, Marcia is able to Identify him and he is once again destroyed.

Septimus is also in search of the long lost Flyte charm. He finds the separated charm and unites it along with the small pair-of-wings Flyte charm that Marcia had given him as a token for his apprenticeship. Eventually he is able to fly and even warns Simon never to harm Jenna again.

== Characters ==
- Septimus Heap: The main protagonist.
- Jenna Heap: The princess and future queen. She is Septimus's adoptive sister.
- Marcia Overstrand: The current ExtraOrdinary Wizard. An extremely powerful wizard, Marcia is known for her short tempers and ambition. She has Septimus as her apprentice.
- Alther Mella: The ex-ExtraOrdinary Wizard whose ghost now helps Septimus to look for Jenna and also gives advice to Marcia.
- DomDaniel: Ex-ExtraOrdinary wizard and Necromancer. DomDaniel was destroyed by Marcia in Magyk, but his bones were placed in Marcia's ShadowSafe to make a Placement on her.
- Simon Heap: Septimus's older brother and Jenna's adoptive brother, he turns out to be one of the main antagonists for this book.
- Silas and Sarah Heap: Septimus Heap's parents.
- Billy Pot: The Palace gardener who is also the inventor of the Contraption — a machine used as a lawn mower.
- Ellis Crackle: Once an apprentice to DomDaniel. DomDaniel Reduced him into a Shadow.
- Hugh Fox: The Chief Hermetic Scribe at Manuscriptorium. He has had secret dealings with Simon Heap. He is the one who gave Simon the half of the Flyte charm.
- Merrin Meredith: He thought he was Septimus Heap, but is actually Nurse Meredith's child. He was once an apprentice to and then later Consumed by Necromancer DomDaniel, but Aunt Zelda saved him from being gone forever. He becomes apprenticed to Simon Heap near the end of the book.
- Morwenna Mould: Current Witch Mother of the Wendron Witch Forest Coven. Saved from a pack of wolverine by Silas before Book 1.
- Nurse Meredith: The landlady of the Doll House after Florrie Bundy, the old landlady, drowned in a drain after having a Shrink Spell done on her by Linda, one of the witches in the Port Witch Coven. Nurse Meredith was the Matron Midwife who snatched Septimus Heap from Sarah for DomDaniel in Book 1.
- Lucy Gringe: She is in love with Simon Heap, and often fights with her parents about it, as they despise all Heaps.
- Gringe: Gate keeper, Lucy's father
- Rupert Gringe: Gringe's son who works Jannit Martin's Boatyard
- Professor Weasal Van Klampff: The professor in charge of constructing the Shadow Safe.
- Una Brakket: Weasal Van Klampff's grumpy housekeeper.
- Sleuth: The faithful servant to Simon Heap. He used to be a bald, old tennis ball in a dumpster, but then Simon dug him out and enchanted him, making him a tracker ball.
- Stanley: Once a message rat, he is now employed in the Secret Rat Service. He is sent to find Jenna when she is kidnapped.
- Sally Mullin: Dock side cafe owner, and Sarah Heap's best friend
- Wolf Boy: Also called Boy 409, Wolf Boy was Septimus' best friend in the Young Army.

=== Dragons ===
- Spit Fyre: A young green dragon that hatches from what was thought to be a green rock that Jenna, the Queenling, had given Septimus. Spit Fyre is able to breathe Fyre and he has had his FirstFlyte with Septimus and Jenna, the Navigator. Spit Fyre seems to be a fun loving and very clumsy dragon. He loves to eat.
- The Dragon Boat: A half-dragon, half-boat is stolen by all the bad guys in the kingdom. Many years ago, the dragon's master, Hotep-Ra, was fleeing from people who wanted to dispose of him. The dragon made the once-in-a-lifetime Transformation into a boat to save her master. She is now permanently a boat. Jenna must visit her once a year on Mid-Summer's Day, the time when the dragon's magic is the strongest.

== Reception ==
Critical reception for the book was positive, with the School Library Journal giving positive reviews for the print book and its audio version. The Toronto Star gave a positive review for Flyte, saying that it "soars past Magyk".
