= Physik =

2007 novel by Angie Sage

- Author: Angie Sage
- Cover artist: Mark Zug (illustrator)
- Language: English
- Series: Septimus Heap (Book 3)
- Genre: Fantasy novel
- Publisher: HarperCollins (US); Bloomsbury Publishing (UK)
- Publication date: March 2007
- Publication place: England
- Media type: Print (hardback & paperback)
- Pages: 576 (paperback edition)
- ISBN: 0060577398 (UK paperback edition)
- OCLC: 70174870
- Preceded by: Flyte
- Followed by: Queste

Physik is a fantasy novel by Angie Sage. It is the third book in the seven-book Septimus Heap series. The story focuses primarily on the 500-year-old spirit of Queen Etheldredda, who attempts to use Septimus Heap to attain immortality.

== Synopsis ==
The book begins with Silas Heap and Gringe accidentally releasing the spirit of Queen Etheldredda — while Unsealing a room for Silas's Counter- Feet Colony — from a painting that she had been trapped in for 510 years. Her release also releases her pet Aie-Aie, which causes a Sickness by biting people. Once released, she drowns Septimus Heap, only to save him for blackmail. She sends Septimus to meet her son Marcellus Pye who drank an incomplete potion of immortality. Marcellus uses a magical mirror to send Septimus back in time to learn Physik from a younger version of Marcellus, in an attempt to complete the potion. Septimus stays with Marcellus for what seemed one hundred and sixty-nine days 500 years ago but was only two days in the present time, he decides to send a message to Marcia finds a note from Septimus in Marcellus' book I Marcellus.

Jenna Heap and Nicko Heap enlist the help of Alther Mella to attempt to travel back in time to find Septimus. Alther takes them to see Alice Nettles, who happens to be housing Snorri Snorrelssen. In Alice's warehouse, they find a Glass that allows them to travel back in time 500 years. Snorri, Jenna, and Nicko fall through the glass, but it's shattered when Spit Fyre attempts to follow them through it. Jenna is confused for the lost princess, Esmeralda and is taken to see Etheldredda, separating her from Snorri and Nicko. She escapes when she meets Septimus by chance at a feast thrown to honor the return of the princess.

Septimus, Jenna, Snorri, and Nicko attempt to pass through the Doors of Time to return to their time period, but the arrival of Etheldredda and Marcellus stop their attempt. They hide in a closet, where they witness Marcellus tell his mother that the potion is not yet completed and she therefore cannot drink it. She insists on drinking the incomplete potion. She and Marcellus then discover Septimus and the others in the closet that they were hiding in. Etheldredda drags Jenna to the Moat to attempt to drown her, but is herself drowned in the process. Due to her having drunk an incomplete potion she is reincarnated as an incomplete spirit. Septimus, Jenna, and Nicko decide to travel through the Doors of Time to return to their own time period, but Nicko leaves in search of Snorri, who had herself gone in search of her cat, Ullr. Septimus and Jenna return to the present without Nicko or Snorri.

Back at the castle, the ghost of Etheldredda attempts to kill Jenna using the IP (Infant Princess) bullet from Magyk, but the bullet instead hits Alice, who throws herself in front of Jenna to protect her. Marcia then uses Spit Fyre's fire to destroy Etheldredda's portrait, which in turn destroys the ghosts of Etheldredda and the Aie-Aie. Septimus then uses his newfound knowledge of Physik to create an antidote for the Sickness.

== Characters ==
- Septimus Heap: The seventh son of a seventh son, youngest child of Sarah and Silas Heap. He is the apprentice to the Extraordinary Wizard Marcia Overstrand.
- Marcia Overstrand: The current Extraordinary Wizard and Septimus' teacher.
- Silas Heap: Father of the Heap children. Huge fan of the game Counter-Feet, an obsession which inadvertently causes the release of Etheldredda.
- Sarah Heap: Mother of the Heap children.
- Jenna Heap: Adopted Daughter of Sarah and Silas Heap. She is the Princess of the Castle, and is sometimes referred to as the Queenling.
- Nicko Heap: 6th son of Sarah and Silas Heap. Talented sailor.
- Snorri Snorrelssen: A young North Trader. She comes to the Castle in search of the ghost of her dead father.
- Queen Etheldredda Queen of the Castle 500 years ago. Widely considered to be the worst queen ever, her moniker was Etheldredda the Awful.
- Alther Mella: Ghost of Marcia Overstrand's teacher, was the Extraordinary wizard before his passing.
- Alice Nettles: Chief Customs Officer of the Port. She was very close to Alther when he was alive.
- Marcellus Pye: The last Alchemist and the creator of the incomplete potion of immortality. He takes Septimus on as an apprentice. Son of Etheldredda.
- Gringe: Friend and counter-feet partner of Silas.

== Reception ==
Reception for Physik was positive receiving favorable reviews from ALA Booklist, Publishers Weekly and School Library Journal. It was included by The Washington Post in their list of books that inspire a love of reading in kids.
