= List of Septimus Heap characters =

This article catalogs the key characters from the books in the Septimus Heap series by Angie Sage. These include the books Magyk, Flyte, Physik, Queste, Syren, Darke, and Fyre. Some characters play a central role in all the books, while others are only central to the plot in one or two of the books. When reviewing the first book in the series, Magyk, Sabina Qazi of Dawn.com described the characters as follows:

These characters remind us of the different types of people around us. Sage separates the qualities that make us who we are and typecasts them into these roles. The good and the bad characteristics are accompanied by the dull and the intelligent, the silly with the mature and the unapproachable with the loving. But this doesn’t mean that her characters are not well-rounded people. They are, but by highlighting certain aspects of their personality, she makes it easy for the reader to think of real people in terms of these characters. Thus an evil principal becomes the necromancer, the dead queen loved grandparent, Septimus as the most intelligent but quiet boy in class and Jenna, perhaps, as the new best friend in the neighbourhood" - Dawn.com

== The Heaps ==
The Heaps are the main characters in the series. Although the story revolves mainly around the protagonist Septimus and his sister Jenna, the whole family comes together in the adventures. They are a "heap of Heaps."

=== Silas and Sarah Heap ===
Silas Heap

Silas is the father of the Heap household. He is an Ordinary Wizard with fair curly hair and wizard green eyes, and wears the traditional blue cloak of Ordinary Wizards. Silas was apprenticed to former ExtraOrdinary Wizard Alther Mella but left his apprenticeship, thus losing the title to Marcia Overstrand. He loves his family and is on good terms with everybody except with Marcia. Silas loves to play Counter Feet with the gate-keeper of the Castle, Gringe. His addiction to the game makes him forget more important things like his family. He was responsible for accidentally releasing the spirit of Queen Etheldredda in Physik.

Sarah Heap

Sarah is the mother of the Heap household. She has the green wizard eyes and fair curly hair of the Heap family. She studied with the Physik woman, Galen, about Magykal herbs and plants and it was there that Silas Heap met her while getting lost in the forest one day. Sarah, though she is loving and caring in nature, is somewhat forgetful and sometimes more concerned about other things rather than the well-being of her dear ones. Sarah has learned Physik and can also do some Magyk. Like Silas she is on good terms generally with everybody, except Marcia.

Critics were surprised by Sage's portrayal of Silas and Sarah as they show least concern for the welfare of their children. The critics have written about situations where the characters' lack of affection is more pronounced:- like when Jenna was kidnapped and they are convinced that Simon cannot kidnap her or when Septimus is sent back in Time.

=== Simon Heap ===
Simon Heap is the oldest Heap son. He wanted to be Marcia's apprentice but lost to Septimus. He betrayed his family in the second book Flyte by joining the evil necromancer DomDaniel and made a bargain with the dead necromancer—to restore him to life, if he's taken on as the next Apprentice to the ExtraOrdinary Wizard. He kidnapped Jenna and tried to kill Marcia by a Placement on her but was thwarted by Septimus and the others. He later learnt his mistakes and reformed his ways. Simon is romantically involved with Lucy Gringe, gatekeeper Gringe's daughter. Together at present they stay in an apartment in the Port. According to Fantasy Literature review, he's like the typical bad-guy who makes the mistake of not killing his enemies straight-away. Simon moved to the Darke side and even tried to kill his siblings Septimus and Jenna. However, note that Simon knew that Jenna was not his real sister and thought Septimus was only pretending to be his little brother so he might not have behaved in the same manner to Nicko, Erik, Edd, Jo-Jo, and Sam, all of whom he saw as real brothers. He has since changed his ways, becoming good and has tried to return to the Castle.

=== Sam, Jo-Jo, Edd & Erik Heap ===
Sam, Edd and Erik (twins) and Jo-Jo are the second, third, fourth and fifth Heap sons, respectively. They all started living in the forest after Sarah took them there for refuge at Galen's place. Wendron Witches visit them quite a lot. Generally they are quite aloof from the happenings of the outside world and have adapted to the ways and life of the Forest. Sam loves fishing and used to go with Silas for catching fish. He was the one who showed Septimus and the others the actual path to the House of Foryx. Jo-Jo has a crush on Marissa, a Wendron Witch. Edd and Erik are twins and love to joke around.

=== Nicko Heap ===
The sixth son of the Heap family. He has a medium-build figure, with the characteristic green eyes of a wizard and the curly straw-colored hair of the Heap family, and has a happy and helpful disposition. As a son of a wizard, Nicko has learned Magyk but is not very interested in it. He is more interested in boats and sailing, a passion which brought him and Snorri Snorrelssen closer. He is apprenticed to Jannit Marten, who owns the boatyard of the Castle. Nicko loves his brother Septimus and adoptive sister Jenna dearly, and helps them in every possible way. He became romantically involved with Snorri, whom he met during events from Physik and was lost in Time with her in Queste. He returned to the Castle during the events of Syren and was one of the main sailors of Milo Banda's ship, the Cerys. In Darke, he helped get Septimus to the Darke Halls. Snorri also left the Castle during Darke to return home with her mother. Although Nicko enjoyed her company, he felt 'free' after she left.

=== Septimus Heap ===
The eponymous protagonist of the series, Septimus spent the first ten years of his life in the Young Army as Boy 412 after DomDaniel attempted to abduct him. As the seventh son of a seventh son, aptly named Septimus, he has exceptional Magykal powers and is currently apprenticed to the ExtraOrdinary Wizard Marcia Overstrand, whom he trusts more than anyone else. He shares his birthday with Jenna, his adoptive sister.

=== Jenna Heap ===
Adopted by the Heap family as a baby in place of Septimus, Jenna is the daughter of the assassinated Queen. She is a small girl, with deep violet eyes, dark hair, and a fair complexion. She wears a deep red cloak with the gold circlet of the Princess on her head. Although loving and caring at heart, she can sometimes be very stubborn. She loves her family dearly and would do anything for them. For a long time, she was unsure and unhappy at the thought of being future Queen, but she has come to accept her heritage and future. She was crowned Queen when she was old enough.

=== Zelda Zanuba Heap ===
Zelda Heap is actually Silas' aunt but is known as Aunt Zelda to all and greatly loved for her happy-go-lucky nature, although she and Marcia are known to have disputes regarding usage of Magyk without "disrespecting" Mother Nature. As the current Keeper of the Dragon Boat, she resides in a cottage on Draggen Island in the Marram Marshes. She is of medium-build, often wears a tent-like dress (which gives her a dumpy appearance), and has a shock of flyaway grey hair, a wrinkled smiling face, and the bright blue eyes of a White Witch. Apparently, she has absolutely no sense of taste and cooks dishes mainly consisting of cabbages and eel. The only other person who appreciates her cooking is Septimus. She has a pet cat called Bert which she transformed into a duck (they're easier to keep in the Marram Marshes) and also is friends with a marsh creature named Boggart. Zelda is the one who revealed the true identity of Boy 412 as Septimus Heap. She is generally very helpful. This is reflected many times in the series; like the time she helps Jenna when the Dragon Boat is badly damaged by Simon's ThunderFlash or reviving Merrin Meredith from being Consumed and dying. Zelda did not appear in the fourth book Queste. In Syren, Zelda sends Wolf-Boy for an errand to The Port Witch Coven, the success of which will entitle him to be a Keeper. In Fyre, she begins to become forgetful and later reveals that she has lost one of the bowls that are used to save the Dragon Boat as the Marsh Python ate it. She then leaves Wolf Boy (now known as Marwick) to be the Keeper as she realises that she is too old and it is her time to die, and goes to visit with her brothers Benjamin and Theo Heap in the Forest as her final resting place.

=== Benjamin and Theo Heap ===
Benjamin and Theo are the grandfathers of the Heap household. Benjamin Heap is the father of Silas. He is a shape shifter. When he got old, he decided to permanently assume tree-form instead of becoming a ghost. Silas kept searching for his father, And sometimes addresses a random tree in the hope that it's his father, until when, the Wendron Witch mother, Morwenna Mould shows him his father's location. Septimus and Nicko met their Grandpa Benji while they were in the forest searching for Jenna in Flyte. Benjamin saved them from a pack of Wolverines and they got to know him.

Theo Heap is the second brother to Benjamin and Zelda. Like his elder brother, he is also a shape-shifter and shifted to be a Storm Petrel. On stormy nights in the Marram Marshes, Zelda keeps a lookout for any Storm Petrels which might be blown away to the marshes and hopes to meet her brother again one day. In Magyk there is an instance when Theo is blown in by a storm and sits on the cottage's roof seeing Zelda see Septimus Heap's (he was Boy 412 then) true identity and family in the pond.

== Other important characters ==
The following are the other important characters in the series who have played a major part in the story.

=== Marcia Overstrand ===
The current ExtraOrdinary Wizard. Ambitious and willful, Marcia is a very powerful wizard. Although she seems stern, bad-tempered and often intimidating, there are a number of instances when she shows she truly has a good heart. She loves her apprentice Septimus dearly and feels great responsibility to protect both him and his sister, perhaps with her life. She also has arguments occasionally with Silas Heap and Jillie Djinn, neither of whom she gets on well with. She is a tall woman, with long, dark curly hair and deep-green eyes, and generally wears a deep purple tunic with her trademark pointy purple python shoes. Her symbol and source of power, the Akhu Amulet, hangs around her neck.

=== Alther Mella ===
Ex-ExtraOrdinary Wizard, before Marcia. He used to be Marcia's tutor before he was murdered in a conspiracy hatched by DomDaniel to take over the Castle. He is present in the world as a ghost and helps Septimus and the others on their adventures. Described to be wearing the purple cloak of the ExtraOrdinary wizard, he has his white shining hair styled as a ponytail at his back and wears big brown boots. In the middle of his ghostly chest he still has an impression of blood indicating the place where a bullet hit him and he died. Alther, being a ghost, can only go to places he has once visited in his lifetime. If he tries to visit some other place, he is Returned, thrown backwards off his feet by an invisible force, which he hates. But still, he can sometimes cause things to be moved about like he did to annoy DomDaniel in Magyk. Being an ex-ExtraOrdinary Wizard he was automatically summoned in the Gathering In Queste. Alther has always shared romantic feelings for Alice Nettles, former Chief Customs Officer, and stays with her ghost in front of the Palace.

=== Snorri Snorrelssen ===
Snorri is an independent and somewhat mysterious young Northern Trader, who comes to the Castle to trade her goods and find her father's ghost. Born to Olaf and Alfrún Snorrelssen, Snorri is a pale complexioned girl with white blonde hair and pale blue eyes with an air of mystery around them. She helps the Heap family, and is especially friends with Nicko, with whom she shares a love of sailing and who she has romantic feelings for. As a Spirit Seer, she can see all spirits, even if they have not chosen to reveal themselves to others. She has an orange pet cat named Ullr who turns into a deadly black panther at night. Snorri helped to prevent Etheldredda's spirit from murdering Jenna, by summoning her father's spirit who stopped Etheldredda from pushing Jenna into the fire conjured by Marcia. In a review by Katie Dickinson of Waterstones.com, she said that the character was interesting and she hoped that Snorri and her mysterious cat would stay on in the series. Snorri, however, leaves the castle at the end of Darke to return home with her mother.

=== DomDaniel ===
A Necromancer and ex-ExtraOrdinary Wizard, he is the main antagonist of the first novel. His main purpose is to regain control of the Wizard Tower from Marcia and tries a number of times to do so. DomDaniel is described as a tall man wearing the black robes of Darke Magyk. On his head is a tall cylindrical black hat which denotes him as a necromancer. DomDaniel is generally described as a conniving, power-hungry and cunning man. He once Consumed his apprentice's body so that he can trick Marcia into giving him her Akhu-Amulet. Marcia Banished him but he tried to take revenge through Simon's help in Flyte. Marcia was able to Identify him again properly and he was completely finished though his ghost endured. But ultimately he vanished into apparent non-existence after his bones were consumed by Spit Fyre.

=== Beetle ===
Actual name O. Beetle Beetle, he is Septimus' best friend from the Manuscriptorium. Introduced in Flyte, Beetle has become a regular character in the series. He assists Septimus on their adventures, and has some of them of his own accord. Beetle is the General Dogsbody and Inspection Clerk in the Magykal Manuscriptorium and Spell Checkers Incorporated and is well loved by all. He also inspects the ice-tunnels under the Manuscriptorium on his sled. Beetle is generally in awe of Marcia but internally has developed a crush on Jenna. He is bitten by the aie-aie and affected by the plague which spread in the Castle in Physik but recovered from it by the medicine brewed by Septimus. After he was fired from the Manuscriptorium by chief scribe Jillie Djinn for discussing Manuscriptorium business in front of Jenna and for saying unflattering things about Jillie Djinn, Beetle joined Septimus and Jenna to bring back Nicko and Snorri from the House of Foryx. In Darke, Beetle is named Chief Hermetic Scribe after the death of Jillie Djinn.

Beetle got his name from his mother, Pamela Beetle, after his father, Brian Beetle, died from a snake bite. His mother, who simply called Brian "Beetle", was forced to impromptu name her child, and all she could do was wail: "Oh, Beetle... Beetle!" Duly, the toddler's name became O. Beetle Beetle. In Syren Beetle assists Septimus and Jenna, while being stranded on the Syren islands, to take care of Spit Fyre and to save the Castle from the impending dangers. In Darke, Beetle is trapped in the Manuscriptorium during The Great Undoing and later is picked to become Chief Hermetic Scribe. He is quite mature for his age and is the youngest person to pass the Manuscriptorium entrance exam. He is also very intelligent. He is about three years older than his best friend Septimus. They share a love of FizzFroot and a hatred of Darke magic. Beetle always wears his Admiral's jacket given to him by Milo Banda in Syren. Beetle is described as stocky and has a shock of black hair. He loves going through the Manuscriptorium Ice Tunnels.

=== Merrin Meredith ===
Introduced in Magyk, Merrin Meredith is a boy who was mistaken for Septimus and was apprenticed to DomDaniel. When a matron midwife stole Septimus at birth from Sarah Heap to give to DomDaniel, circumstance had it that her own son, Merrin, was taken away by DomDaniel and the real Septimus ended up in the Young Army. After his apprenticeship, Merrin is continuously looked down by DomDaniel who always expects him to do brilliant magic (thinking him to be Septimus), which he fails to do. As a whole, Merrin is an unhappy, nasty boy. He was once Consumed by DomDaniel and almost died but was Revived by Zelda. After DomDaniel is destroyed he became Simon's apprentice but ran away from the Badlands to take revenge on Septimus. He took a job in the Manuscriptorium and joined hands with a ghost, Tertius Fume, to send Septimus on a deadly Queste. He is the main villain in Darke and wears the Two-Faced ring only to have his thumb chopped off and him reunited with his mother.

=== Stanley (Rat 101) ===
Stanley is an ex-Secret Service Message rat. His association with the Heaps began in Magyk when he was sent by Sarah to give a message to Silas in the Marshes. From then onwards circumstance had it that Stanley became involved in the adventures of Septimus and his friends. This led to his separation from his wife Dawnie, who went to live with her sister. At present, Stanley is working to set up the Secret Service Message agency again by taking Jenna's permission. Stanley adopted 4 baby ratlets he found on the long walk and claims that he will love them 100 times more than he will ever love Dawnie. Jenna returned from the island of the Syren with rats available for employment. The rats were aboard the Cerys.

=== Queen Etheldredda ===
The Substantial Spirit of an ancient queen with a history of filicide, Etheldredda wreaks havoc on the Castle when her spirit is accidentally released by Silas in Physik. Etheldredda, being an ancient queen is described having the typical dressing sense and looks of a somewhat Renessaince period. Etheldredda was a tyrannical ruler during her rule. Having already murdered her two unnamed twin daughters, she was on the verge of killing her daughter Esmeralda, who was the successor to the throne, when she was thwarted by Septimus and the others back in time in Physik. After getting released, Etheldredda makes a plan to kill Jenna and reclaim her throne again. Marcia defeats her and destroys her forever with help from Snorri Snorrelssen and her father Olaf. Katie Dickinson of Waterstones was impressed by the character and said that "Queen Etheldredda leaves you shivering". Rebecca of Fantasy Literature said that Etheldredda is quite an unnerving villain. She is described to be "As strict and severe as the worst storybook governess and ultimately quite as evil as any fairytale stepmother".

=== Marcellus Pye ===
Etheldredda's son, Marcellus is a renowned Alchemist, who has drunk the potion of immortality. He is over five hundred years old and lives in the Castle near Snake Slipway. When Septimus was sent back in time in Physik by Etheldredda, he became Marcellus' apprentice. While coming back to their own time, Septimus promised Marcellus to prepare a youth potion so that the present Marcellus regains his youth which he did. He seems to dislike having to interact with the outside world, as he understands so little of the modern time and prefers staying at home, though he is on good terms with Septimus and Jenna, who resembles his long gone sister Esmeralda. Critics found his character to be "not the quite good guy, yet not the quite bad guy either."

=== Wolf Boy (Boy 409) ===
Better known as Boy 409, he is a friend of Septimus from the Young Army who got almost drowned one night in an expedition to the Forest, and was left for dead. He was later adopted by wolverines, and left when he got too big. Septimus later met him in his brother's camps in the Forest, where he had been found and re-christened as Wolf Boy. He attempted to help Jenna find Septimus in Physik. He is currently apprenticed to Aunt Zelda and is in the process of becoming the first male Keeper. In Syren, he takes the test to become Keeper. At the Port Witch Coven, he discovers that he must feed Lucy Gringe to the Grim. The two manage to escape, but get tangled with some nefarious sailors. He gets along well with Lucy, except that he doesn't like her screaming. Later, when they meet Septimus, Jenna, and Beetle, he is wary at first. However, he becomes friends with Beetle. Aunt Zelda has grown extremely fond of him and is relieved to see him safe and sound at the end of Syren. In Darke, it is found out that his name is actually Mandy Marwick and he has two other brothers, Matt and Marcus.

=== Lucy Gringe ===
Lucy Gringe is Simon Heap's love interest. In Magyk the pair tried to marry, but the wedding was put off when Simon was dragged away by guards. She refused to believe that Simon had turned evil, and in Physik she set off to find him in the Badlands. It was revealed that they found each other, and the pair looked after Merrin for a short spell before he ran away. In book 5 aka Syren she was captured by the port witch coven but escaped along with Wolf-Boy, only to run into more trouble on The Marauder. She storms The Cerys along with Jenna, Septimus, and Wolf-boy when it became overrun with Skipper Fry and The Crowe Twins, and also saves Miarr's life. In Darke it is announced that Lucy and Simon will marry. Lucy is described as a pretty girl with large brown eyes and brown hair in plaits, which she ties with colored ribbons. She is quite bossy and stubborn, but she is very determined and loyal, and had a warm heart underneath her blunt exterior. She eventually marries Simon Heap and they have a son, William.

== Minor characters ==
Gringe the gatekeeper
The gatekeeper of the North Gate, who is initially very wary of Magyk, including everything to do with the Heaps. However he shares a passion for Counter-Feet with Silas Heap, and when this common interest is found, hostilities end. Simon Heap is still a sore spot for them.
Rupert Gringe
Son of Gringe, and Lucy's older brother. He is apprenticed to Jannit Maarten, so as to avoid being drafted into the young army, and works with her and Nicko Heap down at the Boatyard. However, he dislikes Simon Heap, and challenges him upon sight.
Alice Nettles
Born as Iona Pot, Alice was Alther Mella's girlfriend, but when their separate careers took off, she became Customs officer of the Port, and didn't see Alther much before his death, something she regrets. She was killed while trying to prevent Etheldredda murdering Jenna in Physik. Her ghost at present stays in the courtyard of the Palace where she was murdered, with Alther keeping her company.
Maureen and Kevin
Mostly playing background roles, Kevin was originally the Supreme Custodian's Night servant. One night, he accidentally dropped the Royal Crown, denting it, and he was thrown into the dungeons. He was accidentally released a week later and worked in the palace Kitchens, and soon progressed to Chief Potato Peeler. Maureen was the youngest Kitchen maid at the time when she saw the Heap's dog rush past the garbage chute during their escape. Afterward she started having nightmares about wolves, and she began having sleeping problems. It became so bad that she fell asleep, and a sheep she was meant to be watching over was set aflame. Kevin managed to save her and put the sheep out, and Maureen was demoted to assistant potato peeler. Three weeks later they ran away together to start a better life in the Port. They began to start saving up for their own cafe. Kevin was taken on as a cook for a round-the-world voyage, and Maureen worked in a small inn owned by Florie Bundie, saving up tips, and living in a cupboard beneath the stairs. Kevin eventually returned with enough money to buy their own shop, and they now work in the Harbor and Docke Pie Shop.
Jannit Maarten
The boatbuilder of the Castle, originally from the sheeplands. Jannit is an extremely hard-working and self-sufficient woman. Nicko Heap and Gringe's son Rupert are apprenticed to her.
Spit Fyre
Septimus' beloved dragon who is extremely lazy. He is seemingly always wanting food. Jenna found his egg in a cave in Magyk and, thinking it was just a rock, gave it to Septimus, and he was hatched in Flyte. Spit Fyre used to stay in the Wizard Tower courtyard but Marcia shifted him to the Palace gardens when the courtyard became too messy.
Dragon-Boat
It is a real dragon who once decided to be a dragon boat to save her master, the first ExtraOrdinary Wizard Hotep-Ra. She was attacked by Simon Heap at the end of the second book and at present lays broken in Jannit Marten's boatyard. The Dragon-Boat is critically praised as one of Sage's original ideas and is used to great effect at the climax. The final ingredient to fully heal the dragon boat is found by Jenna in Physik, but Sage (rather curiously) has yet to write a scene for it to be used.
Sally Mullin
She is Sarah's friend and runs the "Sally Mullin Tea and Ale House", which was burnt down in Magyk but later rebuilt, near the port at the Castle. She generally fills in Sarah with the stories going round in the Castle.
Boggart
The Boggart is a Marsh creature and very close to Zelda. He stays in a mud patch just off Draggen Island in the Marram Marshes. He has a good knowledge of the marshes and wishes to be left alone during the day. He was shot in Magyk by Merrin Meredith but later he recovered.
Morwenna Mould
The Witch mother of the Wendron Witches, she promised that the witches will never attack people from the Castle when Silas saved her once from wolverines, but breaks her oath when she did not get Jenna as her own in a bargain she made with Ephaniah Grebe.
Jillie Djinn
Chief Hermetic Scribe at the Manuscriptorium. She is somewhat stubborn, strict and annoyingly officious and is not on good terms with Marcia. She is very strict about time and does not care to lose a single second. She dies during the events of Darke.
Milo Banda
Jenna's biological father; he appeared in Flyte but went off for a voyage again. He returns in Syren as a main protagonist.

Queen Cerys

Jenna's biological mother; she was assassinated just after Jenna was born, so Marcia Overstrand chose Silas and Sarah Heap as adoptive parents for the infant Princess. Cerys is now a ghost who spends most of her time in the Queen's Room, guarding the Queen's Way.
Boris Catchpole
Former Young Army deputy hunter, Boris is at present working as a SubWizard in the Wizard Tower. Learning later, much to his horror, that one of the Young Army, Boy 412, is now apprenticed to Marcia Overstrand.
Ephaniah Grebe
The restorer of documents at the Manuscriptorium. A half-man half-rat, Ephaniah helps Jenna restore Nicko's map of the House of Foryx.
Tertius Fume
The First Chief Hermetic Scribe. Tertius Fume is disliked by all for his general unpleasantness. He is especially loathed by Marcia Overstrand. He has no respect for women and held the office as ExtraOrdinary wizard for seven days as a replacement. He was Banished in Darke by Marcia Overstrand to the Darke Halls.
Hotep-Ra
The first ExtraOrdinary Wizard. He was the one who built the Wizard Tower. The Dragon-Boat belongs to him. He resides now in the House of Foryx.
Talmar Ray Bell
Hotep-Ra's apprentice, who now resides with him in the House of Foryx.
Julius Pike
The ExtraOrdinary Wizard 500 years past. He was a good friend of Marcellus Pye, and loved his apprentice, Syrah Syara, like his daughter.
Syrah Syara
Julius Pike's apprentice. She returned his fatherly love dearly, and she even attempted to punch Tertius Fume in the face when she was appointed to go on the Queste. She spent 500 years on an island following her escape from the Questing Guards, and was possessed by a Syren, which halted her aging. When Septimus meets her, they become instant friends. He subsequently saves her from her possession, but she falls into a coma when she learns of Pike's death. Her fate is unclear, but Septimus visits her every day. She may or may not have developed romantic feelings for Septimus.
