= Nancy Yi Fan =

Chinese-American author (born 1993)

- Born: August 26, 1993 (age 33); Beijing, China
- Occupation: Author
- Writing career
- Language: English, Chinese
- Genre: Fiction
- Subject: Birds
- Notable work: Swordbird (series)
- Website: sites.google.com/site/wwwswordbird/

Nancy Yi Fan (born August 26, 1993 Chinese: 范禕) is a Chinese American author who is best known for writing a series that currently consists of the novels Swordbird, Sword Quest, and Sword Mountain.

== Biography ==
Fan was born in Beijing, China. At the age of 7, she moved with her parents to Syracuse, New York. She started writing her first novel 3 years later, and completed the manuscript within a year. Fan's book became a New York Times Bestseller, and she was featured on The Oprah Winfrey Show as one of the world's smartest kids. She then began writing Sword Quest, a prequel to Swordbird, and published it two years later. Her third book, Sword Mountain, was released in July 2012.

== Career ==
=== Swordbird ===
Fan's novel was inspired by her lifelong love for birds. After awaking from a vivid dream about birds at war while simultaneously wrestling with her feelings about terrorism and the September 11th Attacks, Fan wrote Swordbird as a way to convey a message of peace to the world. At the age of eleven, Fan began writing a manuscript for her story, which she finished a year later. She emailed her manuscript to the CEO of HarperCollins, which led to the novel's 50,000-copy first printing.

=== Sword Quest ===
In 2008, HarperCollins released Sword Quest, a prequel set 100 years before the time of Swordbird.

=== Sword Mountain ===
The third novel in Fan's series released in July 2012, by HarperCollins. This books centers on the golden eagles of Sword Mountain.
