= Mark Zug =

American illustrator (born 1959)

- Born: 1959 (age 66–67); Fort Wayne, Indiana, U.S.
- Known for: Oil painting, sketches
- Notable work: Cover art for the Septimus Heap series by Angie Sage
- Awards: Jack Gaughan Award for Best Emerging Artist (2001); Chesley Award for Best Gaming Related Illustration (2005); IlluXCon's First Illie Award (2010)
- Website: www.markzug.com

Mark Zug (born 1959) is an American artist and illustrator, who worked with the Septimus Heap series and Harlan Ellison's adaptation of I, Robot. Zug has illustrated many collectible card games, including Magic: The Gathering and Dune, books, and magazines. He lives in Pennsylvania.

== Biography ==
=== Early life ===
Zug began drawing as a child. As a teenager, he was influenced by authors such as Frank Herbert and J. R. R. Tolkien. He later worked as a class-A machinist at a factory while exploring a musical career.

=== Rise to prominence ===
Inspired by Frank Frazetta and the illustrators of the Brandywine School, Zug returned to art in 1985. He attended the Pennsylvania School of Art and Design, but did not graduate. He capped his tutorial by ghost-painting covers for Western novels and doing penciling work on historical comic strips. His first big break came in 1992 illustrating Harlan Ellison's I, Robot: The Illustrated Screenplay, for which he also did 160 pages of fully painted comics. He fulfilled a long-held dream of illustrating Frank Herbert's Dune universe in the form of Last Unicorn's collectible card game of the same title, which proved a springboard into game illustration.

=== Present ===
Zug's works have appeared on the covers of novels by authors such as Tanith Lee, Diana Wynne Jones, and Hilari Bell, as well as series like Dragonlance. His work can also be found on the covers of Star Wars comics and the magazines Popular Science, Dragon, Dungeon, Duelist, Inquest, Star Wars Gamer, and Amazing Stories. He is associated with many fantasy game products and brands, such as Shadowrun, Battletech, Dune, and Magic: The Gathering. His work is included in the book Masters of Dragonlance Art.

Zug's first work with children's novels was illustrating the cover art and the inside pictures for the Septimus Heap series by Angie Sage. Zug has illustrated all seven released novels.

== Critical acclaim ==
Zug has received a number of awards for his artwork. His work for the Nancy Yi Fan novel Swordbird was acclaimed, saying that "Mark Zug's black-and-white drawings repeat strategically, offering a visual underpinning to the characters and storyline." He was nominated for a Chesley and received the Jack Gaughan Award for Best Emerging Artist in 2001.

== Bibliography ==
Novels

- 2005: Septimus Heap, Book One: Magyk
- 2006: Septimus Heap, Book Two: Flyte
- 2007: Septimus Heap, Book Three: Physik
- 2008: Septimus Heap, Book Four: Queste
- 2009: Septimus Heap, Book Five: Syren
- 2011: Septimus Heap, Book Six: Darke
- 2013: Septimus Heap, Book Seven: Fyre

Interior art

- 1995: Illustrations (I, Robot: The Illustrated Screenplay)
- 1999: A Whisper of Caladan Seas
- 2000: "High Jump" by Ben Bova in Amazing Stories

Cover art

- 1995: I, Robot: The Illustrated Screenplay
- 1996: Gold Unicorn
- 1997: Red Unicorn
- 1998: Amazing Stories, Fall 1998
- 2003: The Alabaster Staff
- 2003: The Best of The Realms
- 2003: Wild Robert
- 2005: The Shattered Land
- 2005: Septimus Heap, Magyk
- 2006: Septimus Heap, Flyte
- 2007: Septimus Heap, Physik
- 2008: Septimus Heap, Queste
- 2009: Septimus Heap, Syren
- 2011: Septimus Heap, Darke
- 2013: Septimus Heap, Fyre

Dungeons & Dragons

- 2001: Lords of Darkness (cover)
- 2007: Rules Compendium

== Awards ==
Mark Zug has won the following awards for his outstanding works:

- 2001: Jack Gaughan Award for Best Emerging Artist
- 2005: Chesley Award for Best Gaming Related Illustration (2005)
- 2010: Illie Award for "Helium" presented at IlluXCon
