= Angie Sage =

English children's writer, born 1952

- Born: 20 June 1952 (age 74); Thames Valley, England, UK
- Occupation: Author
- Children: 2
- Writing career
- Genre: Fantasy
- Notable work: Septimus Heap series

Angie Sage (born 20 June 1952) is an English author of children's literature, including the Septimus Heap series, the TodHunter Moon trilogy, and the Araminta Spook series (Araminta Spookie, in the United States).

== Life ==
According to her publisher's biography, Sage grew up in the Thames Valley, London and Kent. She tells how her publisher father brought home blank books, and she would write and illustrate her own stories in these. She began to study medicine, but moved instead to the Art School in Leicester to study graphic design and illustration, using these skills to begin illustrating books.

Her first novel was the first in her Septimus Heap series: Magyk.

== Publications ==
The following is a list of books written by Angie Sage. It does not include books she only illustrated.

=== Septimus Heap series ===
- Septimus Heap, Book One: Magyk (2005)
- Septimus Heap, Book Two: Flyte (2006)
- Septimus Heap, Book Three: Physik (2007)
- Septimus Heap, Book Four: Queste (2008)
- Septimus Heap, The Magykal Papers (2009, supplement to the series)
- Septimus Heap, Book Five: Syren (2009)
- Septimus Heap, Book Six: Darke (2011)
- Septimus Heap, Book Seven: Fyre (2013)
- Septimus Heap, The Darke Toad (2013, supplement to the series)

=== TodHunter Moon trilogy (sequel to Septimus Heap series) ===
- TodHunter Moon, Book One: PathFinder (2014)
- TodHunter Moon, Book Two: SandRider (2015)
- TodHunter Moon, Book Three: StarChaser (2016)

=== Araminta Spook series ===
- Araminta Spook, Book One: My Haunted House (2006)
- Araminta Spook, Book Two: The Sword in the Grotto (2006)
- Araminta Spook, Book Three: Frognapped (2007)
- Araminta Spook, Book Four: Vampire Brat (2007)
- Araminta Spook, Book Five: Ghostsitters (2008)
- Araminta Spook, Book Six: Gargoyle Hall (2014 in the UK)
- Araminta Spook, Book Seven: Skeleton Island (2015 in the UK)

=== Enchanter's Child series ===
- Enchanter's Child, Book One: Twilight Hauntings (2020)
- Enchanter's Child, Book Two: Midnight Train (2022)

=== Other books ===
- Rise of the Dragons, Book One (2019)
- Maximillian Fly (2019)
