= Tad Williams bibliography =

This is complete list of works by American science fiction and fantasy writer Tad Williams.

== Osten Ard ==
=== Prequels ===
- Brothers of the Wind (2021)

A prequel set a millennium before The Dragonbone Chair and previously known under the working title The Shadow of Things to Come

- The Splintered Sun (2026)

A prequel following the adventures of Flann Alderwood and his band of misfit rebels in one of Osten Ard’s oldest and strangest cities, Crannhyr, during the pre–Dragonbone Chair history of Hernystir and Erkynland.

=== Memory, Sorrow, and Thorn ===
1. The Dragonbone Chair (1988)
2. Stone of Farewell (1990)
3. To Green Angel Tower (1993)
  - Book 3 was split into two parts for paperback publication (1994):
    - To Green Angel Tower, Part 1 and To Green Angel Tower, Part 2 (United States edition)
    - To Green Angel Tower: Siege and To Green Angel Tower: Storm (United Kingdom edition)
- Novelette - "The Burning Man" (Legends) 1998
- Graphic novel - The Burning Man

=== Osten Ard (bridge novel) ===
1. The Heart of What Was Lost (2017)

=== The Last King of Osten Ard ===
1. The Witchwood Crown (2017)
2. Empire of Grass (2019)
3. Into the Narrowdark (2022)
4. The Navigator's Children (2024)

== Otherland ==
1. City of Golden Shadow (1996)
2. River of Blue Fire (1998)
3. Mountain of Black Glass (1999)
4. Sea of Silver Light (2001)
- Novelette - "The Happiest Dead Boy in the World" (Legends II, 2004)
- Novelette - "The Boy Detective of Oz" (Oz Reimagined: New Tales from the Emerald City and Beyond, 2013)
- Novella - "The Deathless Prince and the Peach Maiden: An Otherland Novella" (forthcoming 18 February 2025)

== Shadowmarch ==
1. Shadowmarch (2004)
2. Shadowplay (2007)
3. Shadowrise (2010)
4. Shadowheart (2010)

== Ordinary Farm series ==
Young adult series, written with Deborah Beale (his wife)

1. The Dragons of Ordinary Farm (2009)
2. The Secrets of Ordinary Farm (2011)
3. The Heirs of Ordinary Farm (work-title, forthcoming)

== Bobby Dollar ==
Noir fantasy thrillers

1. The Dirty Streets of Heaven (2012)
2. Happy Hour in Hell (2013),
3. Sleeping Late on Judgement Day (2014)
4. God Rest Ye Merry, Gentlepig (2014)

== Standalone novels ==
- Tailchaser's Song (1985), illustrated by Braldt Bralds
- Child of an Ancient City (1992), written with Nina Kiriki Hoffman
- Caliban's Hour (Hardcover 1994)
- The War of the Flowers (2003)

== Collections ==
- Rite: Short Work (2006)
- Rite: Short Work (2008) Subterranean Press/Far Territories. Reprint of the limited hc edition without the non-fiction pieces. The reprint only contains the short stories.
- A Stark and Wormy Knight (2011) Beale-Williams Enterprise. And ebook original that contains new pieces of short fiction. Edited by Deborah Beale and sold exclusively by Amazon.com.
- "A Stark and Wormy Knight" (2012) Subterranean Press
- The Very Best of Tad Williams (2014) Tachyon Publications

== Short fiction and screenplays ==
- Short fiction: Williams has published many works of short fiction, beginning with “Child of an Ancient City” in Weird Tales, Fall 1988 (expanded to book length in 1992), and continuing through 2013 with “The Boy Detective of Oz: An Otherland Story” in the anthology Oz Reimagined: New Tales from The Emerald City and Beyond from editors John Joseph Adams and Douglas Cohen; “The Old Scale Game” in the anthology Unfettered from editor Shawn Speakman; and Diary Of A Dragon, a limited edition chapbook from Subterranean Press. Williams’s short fiction has been collected in RITE: Short Work (2006), A Stark and Wormy Knight (2012), and The Very Best of Tad Williams (2014). His short story “The Burning Man” was included in a graphic novel omnibus, The Wood Boy—The Burning Man, (with Raymond Feist) from the Dabel Brothers in 2005.
- Screenplays: Two television ideas, both unproduced, are included in RITE: Short Work: two episodes of “THE CLOAK” and “DOGS VERSUS THE WORLD.” The screenplay, “BLACK SUNSHINE,” is included in A Stark and Wormy Knight.

== Comics ==
Williams’s first comic book series was Mirrorworld: Rain published in 1997. Only two were issued: Number 1 (the premier issue, February 1997) and Number 0 (April 1997), before the publisher Tekno Comix went out of business. In 2006 Williams wrote The Next, a six issue miniseries for DC Comics featuring art by Dietrich Smith (Aquaman, Outsiders) and Walden Wong (Day of Vengeance). In 2007, Tad wrote a one-shot issue for DC Comics’ Helmet of Fate Limited series: The Helmet Of Fate: Ibis The Invincible #1 (March 2007) featuring art by Phil Winslade (The Monolith). Tad continued writing for DC with issues 50 through 57 of Aquaman: Sword Of Atlantis, teamed with artists Shawn McManus (The Sandman, Shadowpact) and Walden Wong (The Creeper, The Next). His proposal, Bad Guy Factory, for a series “based on the idea that all those supervillains had to get their training and equipment somewhere” is included in the collection A Stark and Wormy Knight.

=== Maps and illustrations ===
Williams drew the maps included in his books, and his original illustrations are included in the first world edition of Caliban's Hour.

- Tailchaser's World (Map) (1986)
- The Dragonbone Chair (maps) (1988)
- Stone of Farewell (Maps) (1990)
- To Green Angel Tower (maps) (1993)
- Caliban's Hour (illustrations 1994)
- The Burning Man (map) (1998)
- Shadowmarch: Eion and Xand (maps) (2004)
- Southmarch: The Outer Keep (map) (2004)
- Southmarch: The Inner Keep (map) (2004)
- The March Kingdoms (map) (2004)
- March Kingdoms (map) (2007)
- Shadowplay: Hierosol (map) (2007)

== Non-fiction ==
In addition to writing Introductions, Appendices, Synopses, Forewords, Afterwords, and Author’s Notes for his own books and stories, Williams’s non-fiction includes introductions for other books, essays, letters, and toastmaster speeches.

- Collected in RITE: Short Work (2006)

- Why I Write What I Write
- Idiot: A Brief History of a Band
- 100 Best Horror (The Three Stigmata of Palmer Eldritch)
- Six Books by Philip K. Dick
- Introduction to Michael Moorcock’s Gloriana
- Doctor Strangetoast, or, How I Learned to Stop Worrying and Love the Rocket-Shaped Thing

- Introduction (Dragon Fantastic) (1992)
- Letter (Locus #407) (1994)
- An Appreciation (Elsie Wollheim) (1996)
- Mike Gilbert: An Appreciation (2000)
- Introduction (Gormenghast) (2007)
- Afterword (“The Lamentably Comical Tragedy (or The Laughably Tragic Comedy) of Lixal Laqavee”) (2009)
- Foreword (Elric: Swords and Roses) (2010)
- Ubik: An Afterword (2012)

== Adaptations to other media ==
- Tailchaser’s Song was in development as an animated feature film from Animetropolis, but as of 2026 there have been no tangible updates forthcoming.
- Otherland was adapted as an MMORPG. It was available from September 10, 2015 until January 28, 2016 on Steam Early Access, when it was removed due to alleged technical issues. The game became available again from October 4, 2016 until September 23, 2021 when its servers were shut down permanently.
