= The Heart of What Was Lost =

Fantasy novel by Tad Williams

- Author: Tad Williams
- Cover artist: Michael Whelan
- Language: English
- Genre: Fantasy
- Publisher: DAW Books (US), Hodder Books (UK)
- Publication date: January 2017
- Publication place: United States
- Media type: Print (Hardback and Paperback)
- Pages: 210 (Hardback)
- ISBN: 978-0-7564-1248-7 (US Hardback)
- Preceded by: To Green Angel Tower
- Followed by: The Witchwood Crown

The Heart of What Was Lost is the fourth novel in Tad Williams' Osten Ard saga, following To Green Angel Tower and preceding The Witchwood Crown. The novel was critically praised upon its release. The book is published by DAW Books in the United States, and Hodder Books in the UK.

== Plot summary ==
After Ineluki the Storm King's fall in "Memory, Sorrow, and Thorn", his followers, the Norns, flee the lands of men and retreat north to their ancient city of Nakkiga. As the Norns make their way to their land in the Nornfells, the Rimmersman leader, Duke Isgrimnur, leads his army in pursuit, determined to destroy the Norns and their ancient Queen Utuk'ku once and for all.

The book is told from three points of view: Duke Isgrimnur of Rimmersgard; a Norn leader, Viyeki; and Porto, a Perdruinese mercenary.

== Reception ==
Jason Heller, a book reviewer for NPR, reviewed the book, stating the novel balances "warmth with grimness, and gentle bits of humor with violence and vengeance. Williams has tapped back into the dynamic that made "Memory, Sorrow, and Thorn" so absorbing." Aidan Moher at Barnes & Noble's fantasy blog called The Heart of What Was Lost "a glorious return to a landmark work of Epic Fantasy".
