= The Witchwood Crown =

Fantasy novel by Tad Williams

- Author: Tad Williams
- Cover artist: Michael Whelan
- Language: English
- Genre: Fantasy
- Publisher: DAW Books (US), Hodder Books (UK)
- Publication date: June 2017
- Publication place: United States
- Media type: Print (Hardback and Paperback)
- Pages: 721 (Hardback)
- ISBN: 978-0-7564-1060-5 (US Hardback)
- Preceded by: The Heart of What Was Lost
- Followed by: Empire of Grass

The Witchwood Crown is the fifth novel in Tad Williams' Osten Ard saga, following The Heart of What Was Lost and preceding Empire of Grass. It is the first novel of Williams' The Last King of Osten Ard tetrology. The novel was critically praised upon its release. The book is published by DAW Books in the United States, and Hodder Books in the UK.

== Plot summary ==
More than thirty years have passed since the events of Memory, Sorrow, and Thorn, and the world has reached a critical turning point once again. The realm is threatened by divisive forces, even as old allies are lost, and others are lured down darker paths. Perhaps most terrifying of all, the Norns—the long-vanquished elvish foe—are stirring once again, preparing to reclaim the mortal-ruled lands that once were theirs.

== Reception ==
Kirkus Reviews gave the novel a coveted starred review, calling it is "a richly described, meticulously plotted, and multilayered narrative tapestry featuring a diversity of adeptly developed characters and multiple storylines" and stating, "this is flawless epic fantasy."
