= Sea of Silver Light =

2001 novel by Tad Williams

- Paperback Edition
- Author: Tad Williams
- Cover artist: Michael Whelan
- Language: English
- Series: Otherland
- Genre: Science fiction
- Publisher: DAW Books / Donald A. Wollheim
- Publication date: April 10, 2001
- Publication place: United States
- Media type: Print (hardback & paperback)
- Pages: 922 (Hardback)
- ISBN: 0-88677-977-4 (Hardback)
- OCLC: 46699859
- Dewey Decimal: 813/.54 21
- LC Class: PS3573.I45563 S43 2001
- Preceded by: Mountain of Black Glass

Sea of Silver Light is a science fiction novel by American writer Tad Williams, the fourth and final book in his Otherland series. It was published in 2001 with a paperback release in 2002.

It concludes the saga begun in City of Golden Shadow, taking the characters through a world being born around them as they face off against Dread and the being known as the Other.
