= Sithi =

Sithi may refer to:

People

- Abanti Sithi (born 1992), Bangladeshi singer
- Sithi Fulhu, Maldivian actress

Other

- An elf-like race in the book series Memory, Sorrow, and Thorn by Tad Williams
