= Shadowplay (novel) =

Fantasy novel by American writer Tad Williams

- US First edition cover. Artwork by Todd Lockwood.
- Author: Tad Williams
- Cover artist: Todd Lockwood
- Language: English
- Series: Shadowmarch trilogy: Book 2
- Genre: Fantasy
- Publisher: DAW Books (US); Orbit Books (UK)
- Publication date: March 2007
- Publication place: United States
- Media type: E-Book & Print (hardcover)
- ISBN: 0-7564-0358-8 (US Hardcover); ISBN 1-84149-291-4; ISBN 978-1-84149-291-9 (UK Hardcover)
- OCLC: 85265883
- Dewey Decimal: 813/.54 22
- LC Class: PS3573.I45563 S534 2007
- Preceded by: Shadowmarch
- Followed by: Shadowrise

Shadowplay is a fantasy novel by American writer Tad Williams, the second book in the Shadowmarch tetralogy. It was released in hardcover in the US in March, 2007 and has been released with a region-specific hard cover in the United Kingdom (March 1, 2007). Book one, Shadowmarch, was published in November 2004. Book three of Shadowmarch, Shadowrise was released in March, 2010. A fourth book, Shadowheart, completes the series.

Shadowmarch was originally released between June 2001 and August 2002 as a bi-weekly episodic serial online, with a one-time $14.99 charge necessary to read chapters beyond the five initial free ones, however a lack of subscribers led to the completed first novel (and subsequent volumes) returning to orthodox publishing. The book contains additional chapters not found in the original online version.

UK edition cover by Steve Stone

Originally, Tad Williams conceived Shadowmarch as an idea for a fantasy movie and later a fantasy TV series. Shadowmarch became a print project only after both options fell through.

Originally, Michael Whelan was the cover artist for Shadowmarch and indeed for most Tad Williams books since 1988, but since he is now concentrating on his fine-art work, artist Todd Lockwood has taken over the series from him. The Shadowplay cover features a painting of Xis, the city of the Autarch.

== The Shadowmarch Tetralogy ==
Shadowplay was originally a trilogy but Tad Williams announced in late 2009 that there would be a fourth installment to the series. The given reason was that the third book had become too long to wrap up.

- Shadowmarch, November 2004.
- Shadowplay, March 2007.
- Shadowrise, March 2010.
- Shadowheart, November 30, 2010.

== Teaser Chapters ==
Two chapters from Shadowplay were published online prior to publication to generate enthusiasm for the upcoming book.

- Chapter One: Exiles Published on Shadowmarch.com.
- Chapter Eight: The Unremarkable Man Published on Shadowmarch.com and in the back of the mass-market paperback of Shadowmarch (pages 781–796) published in September 2006 by Daw Books.

== Plot summary ==
Darkness has fallen on the lands of the sun as an army of misshapen fey spill out from beyond the Shadowline. At their head is Yasammez, dark creature of nightmare. A furtive bargain was struck at the gates of Southmarch and the castle was spared, but centuries of enmity will not be so easily appeased. Meanwhile, Barrick, heir to Southmarch and cursed with madness, has crossed the Shadowline into the realm of his people's ancient enemy. There are stranger things than death here – stranger and older. Much further south, shadow is also falling over the reign of the Autarch, god-king, and supreme ruler. Qinnitan, junior wife, must flee the royal household or die, her greatest secret as yet hidden even from herself. Ancient blood flows through her veins and she will become a unique weapon in the fight against her greatest terror. And beyond the ken of all but a chosen few, the gods are awakening and the world is changing.
