= To Green Angel Tower =

1993 novel by Tad Williams

- US Hardcover Edition
- Author: Tad Williams
- Cover artist: Michael Whelan
- Language: English
- Series: Memory, Sorrow, and Thorn
- Genre: Fantasy novel
- Publisher: DAW Books
- Publication date: March 1993
- Publication place: United States
- Media type: Print (Hardback and Paperback)
- Pages: 1104 pp (Hardback)
- ISBN: 0-88677-521-3 (US Hardback)
- OCLC: 27606407
- Dewey Decimal: 813/.54 20
- LC Class: PS3573.I45563 T6 1993
- Preceded by: Stone of Farewell

To Green Angel Tower is the third and final novel in Tad Williams' Memory, Sorrow, and Thorn trilogy. At over 520,000 words, it is one of the longest novels ever written. Due to the length of the novel, the paperback version had to be split into two separate volumes, known as To Green Angel Tower: Part 1 and Part 2. In the United Kingdom, the two paperback volumes were titled To Green Angel Tower: Siege and To Green Angel Tower: Storm. The saga follows a young man named Simon as he is caught up in an epic adventure.

== Plot introduction ==
As the Storm King's power grows, the loyal allies of Prince Josua struggle to rally their forces at the Stone of Farewell. There, Simon and the surviving members of the League of the Scroll attempt to unravel a prophecy that may ultimately allow them to strike down the undead Storm King and bring peace to the kingdom. This epic saga concludes as Simon travels back to castle Hayholt to confront Ineluki.

== Plot summary ==
Paperback cover for Part 1 of To Green Angel Tower.

The story begins with the forces of Prince Josua Lackhand rallied at the Stone of Farewell, where the icy hand of the Storm King Ineluki has yet to take a deathgrip on the land. The remaining members of the League of the Scroll have also gathered at the Stone in hopes of unraveling an ancient prophecy. If deciphered, it could reveal to Josua and his army the only means of striking down the unslayable Storm King.

After Simon/Seoman Snowlock and Binabik have their reunion, they come to the realization that Memory – one of the three Great Swords recognized as being key to defeating the Storm King – is one and the same with Bright-Nail, old King John’s sword that was buried with him not three years previously. The trouble is, the grave of King John Presbyter lies in the shadow of the Hayholt, the stronghold of King Elias, and between the Stone of Farewell and Hayholt marches the army Elias has sent to besiege the defenders.

Meanwhile, Miriamele, Elias’s daughter, has joined Josua’s cause but remains a prisoner aboard the ship of an ambitious lordling, having surrendered her virtue to him before discovering his true nature. Maegwin, princess of Hernystir, becomes increasingly unstable as she leads her people in resistance against Elias’s allies, who have conquered the kingdom. Elsewhere, in the ancient forest of Aldheorte, the immortal Sithi prepare for an approaching conflict.

While Josua and his army must make a final stand to try to delay the forces of King Elias, Simon embarks upon a quest to Hayholt Castle to try to obtain the last of the three legendary swords and use their hidden magics to defeat The Storm King Ineluki and restore peace to Osten Ard once and for all.

== Major characters ==
Paperback cover for Part 2 of To Green Angel Tower.

=== Qanuc ===
- Binabik, Singing Man of Mintahoq Mountain
- Sisqinanamook, daughter of the chieftains of Mintahoq Mountain

=== Sithi ===
- Jiriki i-Sa'onserei (the Sithi prince)
- Aditu (Jiriki's sister)
- Likimeya y-Briseyu no'e-Saonserei (mother of Jiriki and Aditu, leader of Sithi folk)
- Ineluki, the Storm King

=== Norns ===
- Utuk'ku the Norn Queen

=== Erkynlanders ===
- Simon Snowlock
- Prince Josua Lackhand
- King Elias, High King of Osten Ard
- Guthwulf, Earl of Utanyeat
- Princess Miriamele, daughter of Elias

=== Rimmersmen ===
- Duke Isgrimnur, ruler of Rimmersgard
- Isorn (Isgrimnur's son)
- Sludig, Rimmersgard soldier

=== Hernystiri ===
- Cadrach
- Eolair, Count of Nad Mullach
- Princess Maegwin, daughter of King Lluth

=== Other or unknown ===
- Geloë (possibly Tinukeda'ya: Aditu calls her "Ruyan's Own" TGAT part 2, ch 1)
- Pryrates (Nabbanai or Perdruinese: "from a poor island family" TGAT part 1, ch 9)
- Tiamak (Wrannaman)
- Sir Camaris (Nabbanai)

== Cover art ==
Two versions of the U.S. hardcover dust jacket were produced. Both have Michael Whelan paintings on the front and back with one painting being titled "Seoman" and the other "Jiriki". The difference between the covers is that the front and back paintings were switched. Both paintings were also "flopped" (reversed left-to-right) so that the characters are facing away from the spine on both the front and back for both covers. The same paintings were then used as the cover art for the part 1 and part 2 paperback editions.

== Reception ==
The book was listed for five weeks on The New York Times Best Seller list.
