= The Dragonbone Chair =

1988 novel by Tad Williams

- US Hardcover Edition
- Author: Tad Williams
- Cover artist: Michael Whelan
- Language: English
- Series: Memory, Sorrow, and Thorn
- Genre: Fantasy
- Publisher: DAW Books
- Publication date: October 25, 1988
- Publication place: United States
- Media type: Print (Hardback and Paperback)
- Pages: 672 (Hardback)
- ISBN: 0-8099-0003-3 (US Hardback)
- OCLC: 18456505
- Dewey Decimal: 813/.54 20
- LC Class: PS3573.I45563 D7 1988
- Followed by: Stone of Farewell

The Dragonbone Chair is a fantasy novel by American writer Tad Williams, the first in his Memory, Sorrow, and Thorn trilogy. It is set in the fantastical land of Osten Ard, where humans coexist with other sentient creatures including the Sithi and Qanuc. When Osten Ard is threatened by the Storm King of the Sithi, the League of the Scroll seeks the only hope for salvation. Simon, a chore boy in the royal castle and apprentice to this League, must embark on a quest concerning lost swords of power. He leaves the only home he's ever known for a perilous journey, wherein the land itself begins to die.

== Plot summary ==
Simon, a fourteen-year-old kitchen boy and servant in the great castle Hayholt, muddles his way through the daily routines of castle drudgery in the last days of the long reign of Prester John, the High King of Osten Ard. Simon is thrilled when luck turns his way and he finds himself apprenticed to the good Doctor Morgenes, the castle's healer and wizard, after which Simon alternates his time between his menial chores and learning to read and write, under instruction by the doctor. Shortly after the death of the great King John, his son Elias, whom many say is a pawn of the evil cleric Pryrates, takes the throne. Shortly afterwards, King Elias's brother Josua mysteriously disappears, and the new reign begins to curdle in suspicion and discontent. Elias, blinded by his desire for power, creates a pact with the undead Sithi ruler, the Storm King, who himself seeks to regain his lost realm through a pact with one of human royal blood.

When Simon accidentally stumbles into the castle dungeons, he discovers that Prince Josua is being held captive, so he and Morgenes conspire to rescue the prince. Simon and Morgenes are successful, and Josua is able to flee the castle. Soon after, Elias's soldiers, led by Pryrates, storm Morgenes's office. Morgenes is slain by a dark magic, and Simon is able to flee the castle through a secret passage at the back of the doctor's office. Armed only with his mentor's biography of the good King John, Simon is lost and despondent.

After endless hours in the tunnels beneath Hayholt, which is actually the remains of the Sithi castle, Asu'a, Simon stumbles back into the open beyond the castle and town. There, he accidentally witnesses a scene of evil magic involving the king, Pryrates and a few white-faced and white-haired demons. Horrified, he stumbles through the woods on the road north towards Naglimund, the seat of Prince Josua. About halfway to Naglimund, he stumbles upon a strange creature, caught in a cotsman's trap. Simon realizes it must be one of the Sithi, an elven-like folk who was thought to have disappeared from the lands. He rescues him from the trap and in answer is shot at with a white arrow. At that moment, he encounters a troll by the name of Binabik. Binabik tells Simon that the white arrow is a symbol of an obligation towards Simon, and together they travel further towards Naglimund.

While traveling through the Aldheorte forest, they save a young servant girl and her sister from vicious hounds. They travel to Geloë, a witch who helps them escape the soldiers pursuing them. While in her house, Simon, Binabik and Geloë also walk the Dreamroad to try to find answers but only find enemies waiting.

They finally reach Naglimund, where they meet with Prince Josua. Simon begins training to be a soldier, as it is common knowledge that Elias is leading an army towards Naglimund. Whilst having a raed [council], an old man appears: Jarnauga. There, the travelers learn of the existence of three legendary swords by the names of Minneyar (or "Year of Memory"), Sorrow, and Thorn. The magic of these swords is the only hope against the combined power of the two High Kings, the ancient Sithi and the new-crowned human, who already have possession of at least one of the swords. They also learn the history of the Sithi and the Storm King, and of the existence of Utuk'u, Queen of the Norns, who are the northern cousins of the Sithi. It is then that Simon realizes that his vision of the dark magic just after his escape from Hayhold was no vision at all but an actual event, and that the white-faced demons were actually Norns. In Naglimund, Simon also learns of a small group of scholars known as the League of the Scroll, of which Morgenes was a member and of which Jarnauga and Binabik are also members. Binabik is only a recent member, after the death of his master Ookequk. Recognizing the true danger facing the land of Osten Ard, only the League holds the knowledge of times past, which may be the only hope of salvation for young Simon and his friends. To Simon's dismay he also finds out that Marya the serving girl whom they saved is actually Miriamele, only child and daughter of King Elias, who had fled her father's madness to join her uncle's cause.

They learn then that the black sword Thorn, once belonging to Camaris the greatest knight of history, is not lost in the depths of the sea, as once thought. It may still exist in the frozen heights to the north, near Binabik's ancestral home.

Simon and Binabik join a group of soldiers to go to the far north to recover the magical blade. Along the way they run into Sithi and the one that Simon saved turns out to be the son of the ruling House named Jiriki. Together with An'nai, one of his kinsmen, the Sitha prince joins their quest to the north and helps them survive several dangers. Eventually, Simon and his small company reach the icy mountains which are home to the powerful sword. Simon discovers the blade but shortly afterwards the troupe is attacked by a fierce iceworm, Igjarjuk. Simon, despite his fears, bravely tries to fight it off, suffering a wound in the process.

As the novel progresses, the narrative widens, giving the reader secondary viewpoints besides those of Simon. Some of the side stories, which have great importance nonetheless, include those of Isgrimnur, Duke of Rimmersgard; Maegwin, the daughter of the Hernystiri client king; and Tiamak, a scribe in the marshes of the distant South.

Miriamele, the king's daughter, fled to her uncle in Naglimund. His protectiveness of her frustrates her however, so she flees Naglimund before its fall towards her kin in Nabban, intending to win their allegiance. A drunken monk named Cadrach travels with her; he has many secrets and a mysterious past. Isgrimmnur is sent after Miriamele to ensure her safety and return her to Josua.

In Hernystir, the king and his son are slain and their people driven into hiding in the mountains. There, Count Eolair attempts to assist Maegwin the king's daughter but she is sinking into madness while trying to find a way to save her people.

The book ends with the fall of Naglimund: after King Elias accepted the Storm King's terms and bargain, a host of Norns, giants, and undead servants of the Storm King arrive and utterly destroy the castle. Josua escapes with only 11 other people, amongst them Deornoth, his sworn sword, and Gutrun and Isorn, wife and son of Isgrimmnur. Simon opens his eyes after the dragon to find his face bearing a long burn scar and a swath of hair turned white.
