= River of Blue Fire =

1998 novel by Tad Williams

- Author: Tad Williams
- Cover artist: Michael Whelan
- Language: English
- Series: Otherland
- Genre: Science fiction
- Publisher: DAW Books / Donald A. Wollheim
- Publication date: July 1, 1998
- Publication place: United States
- Media type: Print (hardback & paperback)
- Pages: 634 (Hardback)
- ISBN: 0-88677-777-1 (Hardback) ISBN 0-88677-844-1 (Paperback)
- OCLC: 40061628
- Dewey Decimal: 813/.54 21
- LC Class: PS3573.I45563 R58 1998
- Preceded by: City of Golden Shadow
- Followed by: Mountain of Black Glass

River of Blue Fire is a science fiction novel by American writer Tad Williams, the second book in his Otherland series. It was originally published in 1998, the paperback in 1999.

It continues the saga begun in City of Golden Shadow and takes the characters through among others a Wizard of Oz simulation, a Neanderthal world and a cartoon world.
