= Stone of Farewell =

1990 fantasy novel by Tad Williams

- First edition
- Author: Tad Williams
- Cover artist: Michael Whelan
- Language: English
- Series: Memory, Sorrow, and Thorn
- Genre: Fantasy
- Publisher: DAW Books
- Publication date: August 1990
- Publication place: United States
- Media type: Print (hardback and paperback)
- Pages: 608 (hardback)
- ISBN: 0-88677-435-7
- OCLC: 22143548
- Dewey Decimal: 813/.54 20
- LC Class: PS3573.I45563 S76 1990
- Preceded by: The Dragonbone Chair
- Followed by: To Green Angel Tower

Stone of Farewell is a 1990 fantasy novel by Tad Williams, the second volume of his Memory, Sorrow, and Thorn trilogy. The saga develops the narrative started in The Dragonbone Chair and focuses primarily on Simon, a former kitchen servant in the largest castle in the land.

== Plot summary ==
The previous volume saw Simon wound a dragon with the mystical sword Thorn, splashing himself in dragon’s blood, leaving himself deeply scarred (physically and emotionally). Now bearing the sobriquet "Snowlock", he and his companions leave the mountains in search of the mysterious "Stone of Farewell".

Meanwhile, Josua "Lackhand", brother to the king, leads a motley band of survivors after the disastrous events at Naglimund.

Princess Miriamele, having escaped before the siege of Naglimund, gets caught up in events that demonstrate the evil powers surrounding her father.

Princess Maegwin of Hernystir leads her people deep underground, where they discover secrets that may help turn the tide in a war thought to be hopeless.

Finally, a power rises in the North, but its true implications may not yet be fully revealed.

== Reception ==
In Locus, Carolyn Cushman called the novel "an epic fantasy you can get lost in for days, not just hours".

Kat Hooper of fantasyliterature.com gave The Stone of Farewell a rating of 3.5 out of 5 and a mixed review, calling it "excessively lengthy" and saying it "is everything we’ve come to expect from a middle book in a well-written traditional medieval-style epic fantasy trilogy".
