= Mountain of Black Glass =

1999 novel by Tad Williams

- Author: Tad Williams
- Cover artist: Michael Whelan
- Language: English
- Series: Otherland
- Genre: Science fiction
- Publisher: DAW Books / Donald A. Wollheim
- Publication date: September 1, 1999
- Publication place: United States
- Media type: Print (hardback & paperback)
- Pages: 720 (Hardback)
- ISBN: 0-88677-849-2 (Hardback)
- OCLC: 42085452
- Dewey Decimal: 813/.54 21
- LC Class: PS3573.I45563 M68 1999
- Preceded by: River of Blue Fire
- Followed by: Sea of Silver Light

Mountain of Black Glass is a science fiction novel by American writer Tad Williams, the third book in his Otherland series. It was first published in 1999 with a paperback edition in 2000.

Continuing from River of Blue Fire, it brings the characters together at the battle of Troy and finally to the heart of the Grail Brotherhood.
