= City of Golden Shadow =

1996 novel by Tad Williams

- US Hardcover Edition - Originally titled Otherland
- Author: Tad Williams
- Cover artist: Michael Whelan
- Language: English
- Series: Otherland
- Genre: Science fiction
- Publisher: Legend Books
- Publication date: December 5, 1996
- Publication place: United States
- Media type: Print (hardback & paperback)
- Pages: 770 (Hardback) & 960 (Paperback)
- ISBN: 0-09-968301-6 (Hardback); 1-85723-604-1 (Paperback)
- OCLC: 43226490
- Followed by: River of Blue Fire

City of Golden Shadow, originally published as Otherland, is a science fiction novel by American writer Tad Williams, the first book in his Otherland series. The "Otherland" refers to a virtual world or worlds and the "City Of Golden Shadow" is a city in the Otherland network to which the main characters are being summoned.

The novel tells the story of a frightening virtual network created by a group of rich men known as The Grail Brotherhood. These men include: Felix Jongleur, who was a child at the time of the First World War and is currently the world's oldest man; Jiun Biao, a Chinese economist described as "the terror of Asia"; and Robert Wells, the owner of Telemorphix, the world's largest telecommunications company. The book tells the story of a group of ordinary people who are drawn into the network to stop them.

== Plot summary ==
The first character introduced is a man called Paul Jonas, apparently an infantryman on the Western Front of the First World War. In what he at first believes to be a dream or hallucination, he meets a woman with wings, who gives him a feather. He wakes from the experience to find himself back in the trenches, but realizes the experience was not a dream when he discovers the feather. Two of his comrades, Finch and Mullet, begin to express doubts about his sanity. Eventually, Paul runs off into no-man's land. There, he finds the bird-woman but Finch and Mullet have pursued him, and they have been transformed into monstrous shapes: Mullet is grossly fat and Finch has no eyes. Paul flees in terror and falls through a hole in space. He discovers himself in a place similar to the chess-land in Lewis Carroll's Through the Looking-Glass, where he is caught in the battle between the red and the white, as well as hunted by Finch and Mullet. He escapes with a young boy he met at an inn, whose name is Gally. They find themselves on Mars, which is inhabited by creatures who demand a sacrifice of a princess from the planet Venus each year. He recognizes the chosen woman as the winged woman he met earlier, but he cannot remember when he met her. His memory does not even extend to his time in the chess-land. With the help of other men from Earth, he rescues the princess, then flees from the angry Martians. He sees Mullet and Finch again, however, and tries to escape in a hijacked airship. He loses control of the airship and finds himself in a conservatory with a harp, which shrinks to the size of his palm. Mullet and Finch confront him, demanding that he give them the harp, but he refuses and appears again on the airship, which is hurtling toward the ground. Transported to yet another world, he is rescued from a frozen river by a group of Neanderthals, and a voice comes from the harp, telling him that friends will search for him on the river.

The story moves to the late 21st century. The most significant technological change is the wide availability of virtual reality interfaces among all parts of society. The internet has been replaced by "the Net," a vast network of online VR environments. In Durban, a VR programming instructor named Irene "Renie" Sulaweyo is teaching a Kalahari San named !Xabbu how to create such environments, while providing for her family. Her family is made up by her alcoholic father Long Joseph and her ten-year-old brother Stephen. Stephen spends much of his time online and frequently joins his friends in escapades to forbidden areas of the net. When he somehow ends up in a coma after visiting a forbidden club, she and !Xabbu decide to investigate. Inside the club, they discover a number of very unsavoury entertainments, and are very nearly trapped by the managers. Their most bizarre and horrifying discovery is a very powerful hypnotic entity, which Renie nearly dies trying to escape from. Convinced that the club is set up to damage the minds of children, as it has done to Stephen, she resolves to stop the people responsible. She finds an unusual and large piece of code, in the form of a golden diamond, on her machine, and consults her friend and mentor, Dr. Susan van Bleeck, about it. As they examine it, it erupts into an image of a golden city, then disappears. Renie's difficulties multiply, as it becomes clear that her investigations have earned her powerful enemies: she is stood down from her job and unknown persons set fire to her family's apartment complex. Finally, van Bleeck is brutally assaulted and dies after leaving Renie and !Xabbu with three names: Martine Desroubins, Blue Dog Anchorite, and Bolivar Atasco. The first two are hackers that agree to help them find the golden city, which is in a mysterious network called "Otherland", while the third is an anthropologist and archaeologist whose expertise is pre-Columbian Latin America. Blue Dog Anchorite reveals himself to be Murat Sagar Singh, a retired programmer who worked on the security system for Otherland, and whose colleagues on the same project have been dying in unusual circumstances. He also reveals that Otherland was commissioned by a secret organisation called "The Grail Brotherhood", and that Atasco, who oversaw the security project for Otherland, was an important member of that organisation. Renie, !Xabbu, Martine, and Singh plan to break into Otherland; Renie and !Xabbu, along with Long Joseph and van Bleeck's assistant Jeremiah Dako, travel to Wasps' Nest, a mothballed military base in the Drakensberg mountains, where there is equipment allowing Renie and !Xabbu to stay connected to the Net for extended periods. Preparations completed, they hack into Otherland, but Singh is confronted and killed by the security system. He is later found dead in his room from a heart attack. Renie, !Xabbu, and Martine manage to enter Otherland and make their way to the golden city, which is called Temilún. There, they meet the God-King, who reveals himself to be Atasco.

In suburban California, a terminally-ill teenager named Orlando Gardiner has become the most celebrated warrior in Middle Country, an online VR MMORPG based on swords-and-sorcery. However, while playing the game, he is distracted by a vision of a golden city and killed by a low-level monster. With the help of his friend, Sam Fredericks, he begins to investigate. Their investigations lead to TreeHouse, an online fringe community, and to Melchior, a code name used by Singh and others. Following the trail, they are mysteriously taken to a beach on a river. Across the river, they can see the golden city. They build a raft to cross the river, but are stopped by the police and taken to the palace of the God-King.

On an army base in North Carolina, the young girl Christabel Sorensen becomes friends with Mr. Sellars, a mysterious old man living on the base. She is unaware that he is under house arrest, and her father, a senior military security officer, is in charge of guarding him. She helps him to escape from his house into a network of tunnels lying underneath the base.

The Grail Brotherhood emerges as a small number of the world's wealthiest and most powerful people who have formed an exclusive society. Otherland is their private network, where many of them own numerous simulation worlds (others being leased out for very large sums), and they intend to use it for even more mysterious purposes. They meet in a simulation based on ancient Egypt, where their leader, Felix Jongleur, appears as Osiris and obliges other members to present themselves as various Egyptian deities. Jongleur commissions an employee, John Dread, to carry out a task referred to as the "Sky God Project." Dread promises to accomplish his mission, although it is not stated what exactly he must do.

Renie, !Xabbu, Martine, Orlando, Fredericks, and four other people in similar situations find themselves imprisoned in a virtual reality world so complex that it rivals reality. There, they meet Atasco and his wife, and learn that Atasco, though formerly a member of the Grail Brotherhood, has been uninvolved for some time (though he has been permitted to retain his simulation world), and is now secretly opposing the Brotherhood's plans. They meet the enigmatic Mr. Sellars, who tells them that the network is somehow built from the minds of catatonic children worldwide, and he calls upon the small group of adventurers to stop the Grail Brotherhood.

Before they can get their questions answered, however, the meeting descends into chaos. Unknown to any of those gathered, Dread and a team of expert assassins have attacked the Atascos' island home in Colombia, and Bolivar and his wife are suddenly murdered. Sellars gives the adventurers some brief instructions: they are to search along the river for Paul Jonas, who is at large within Otherland's many simulation worlds, then he too vanishes. Even as the adventurers flee Temilún, Dread, with the help of criminal hacker Dulcie Anwin, hijacks the simulation body of one of their party. The group sails down the river, hoping to find the answers that will enable them to free the children from Otherland's hold.

== Characters in "City of Golden Shadow" ==
- Paul Jonas: A person trapped within the Otherland network. When first introduced, Paul believes himself to be a soldier condemned to the trenches of the First World War. Because he underwent "treatment" (brainwashing) before being introduced to the simulation, he cannot remember anything that happened more than a few days ago. As he explores the simulation, he struggles to discover who he is, as well as trying to escape from Mullet and Finch, agents of The Grail Brotherhood.
- Mullet: Supposedly a companion of Paul Jonas in the trenches. When Paul escapes the World War I simulation, however, Mullet, in various incarnations, pursues him through the other simulations of the Otherland network. Later revealed to be Mudd, an employee of Felix Jongleur.
- Finch: Mudd's companion, who pursues Paul. His real name is Finney.
- Gally: A boy that Paul meets in the Otherland simulation, and who accompanies him in his flight from Mullet and Finch. He demonstrates to Paul the significance of the river that flows through the various simulation worlds in Otherland.
- Irene "Renie" Sulaweyo: A South African computer teacher, whose younger brother Stephen falls into a coma, prompting the research that leads to her discovery of the Otherland network.
- !Xabbu: A bushman from the Kalahari desert, and a student of Renie. He helps her research the cause of her brother's coma, and enters the Otherland network with her. His spiritual guidance keeps Renie sane, as well as providing her with a viewpoint that does not take the technology of her civilization for granted.
- Stephen Sulaweyo: Renie's eleven-year-old brother, who spends a large amount of his time in virtual reality with his friends Eddie and Soki. He falls into a coma after visiting a forbidden area of the net, and is moved to a hospital, where he remains for most of the story.
- Long Joseph Sulaweyo: Renie's father, described as a once-honorable man who became an alcoholic after the accidental death of his wife (Renie's mother). Apathetic about the problems and emotions of his family members, he resists Renie's attempts to keep him safe.
- Dr. Susan van Bleeck: A rich technology expert who at one time taught Renie virtual engineering. Renie contacts her after her brother falls ill, and she is able to direct Renie to Martine Desroubins, Murat Sagar Singh, and Bolivar Atasco before agents of the Grail Brotherhood murder her.
- Jeremiah Dako: Susan van Bleeck's butler and cook, who joins Renie and !Xabbu after van Bleeck is murdered.
- Strimbello: A man who operates an ominous club designed to entice children to enter a situation where they can be mentally damaged for the benefit of the Grail Brotherhood. He is responsible for putting Stephen into a coma, and nearly succeeds in doing the same to Renie and !Xabbu.
- Murat Sagar Singh: Also known by the code name "Blue Dog Anchorite", Singh is an elderly man who was an acquaintance of Susan van Bleeck and a worker on some programming for the Otherland project. He helps Renie, !Xabbu, and Martine hack into the system, but is killed by a malevolent aspect of the Otherland security system when he tries to enter with them.
- Martine Desroubins: An acquaintance of Susan van Bleeck who lives in France, and who assists Renie and !Xabbu and enters Otherland with them. She is revealed to be blind, and interprets virtual reality through different mechanisms than the others, so the large amount of information in the Otherland system starts to drive her insane, and she is seemingly ill because of this at the end of the book.
- Orlando Gardiner: A terminally ill teenager who plays the VR MMORPG Middle Country with his best (and only) friend Fredericks. After he discovers an image of a golden city, a location in the Otherland network, he becomes obsessed with finding it. Both he and Fredericks enter Otherland, despite the fact that he is very sick with pneumonia. At the end of the book, he is unconscious and at risk of dying from his disease, cared for by members of the other eight people who also succeeded in entering Otherland.
- Salome Fredericks: Simply called Fredericks, she is a friend of Orlando's who wears the sim of a man, but is actually a teenage girl (Orlando, her best friend, is unaware of her true gender until late into the plot). She does not approve of Orlando's attempts to learn about Otherland, believing that they are likely to get harshly punished for their actions, but accompanies him on all of his exploits.
- Mr. Sellars: An elderly man imprisoned on an army base in North Carolina, who 'recruits' Orlando and the others by leaving clues about the Otherland scattered across the net. Eventually, he meets them in Otherland, and tries to explain the situation and what they must do.
- Christabel Sorensen: A young girl living on the army base, who secretly becomes friends with Mr. Sellars and helps him escape from the army base.
- Felix Jongleur: The oldest person on earth, born before the outbreak of World War I, he is also one of the wealthiest and most powerful, and certainly one of the most ruthless. He is the leader of the Grail Brotherhood, and masterminded the creation of the Otherland system. Through much of the book, he appears in his preferred environment, a simulation of ancient Egypt, where, as Osiris, he presides over meetings of the Grail Brotherhood.
- Johnny Wulgaru: Known by his adopted name Dread, this character's real name is only mentioned once, and then in reference to his unhappy childhood. He has the power to manipulate electronic devices, an ability he calls his "twist", and views his life as a sort of movie. He makes sport of hunting and killing women. Despite his dangerous obsession with rape and murder, Jongleur, who calls him "Anubis", recruits him to assassinate Atasco. He has an uneasy relationship with Jongleur, who has kept many secrets from him, and when he breaks into Otherland he welcomes the opportunities to secretly gain information about Jongleur's plans.
- Robert Wells: A centenarian living in Oregon, where he heads the powerful technology firm Telemorphix, Wells is a member of the Grail Brotherhood, appearing in Jongleur's Egypt as the god Ptah. While his technical expertise makes him indispensable to the Brotherhood's plans, he is unpopular among many of the other members. He heads a minority faction which seeks to remove Jongleur from leadership.
- Daniel Yacoubian: A general in the US Army, he is also a member of the Grail Brotherhood, appearing in Jongleur's Egypt as the god Horus. He schemes with Wells to remove Jongleur from his position of leadership.

== Reception ==
Andy Butcher reviewed Otherland: City of Golden Shadow for Arcane magazine, rating it an 8 out of 10 overall, and stated that "City of Golden Shadow is an impressive work, skilfully interweaving many seemingly unrelated characters and plots into a cunningly-fashioned whole, and blending a gritty, cyberpunk edge with the dull mediocrity that is life for the masses, the fantastic world of Otherland, and the secretive machinations of the Grail Brotherhood. It's not an easy read, especially at the start when few of the pieces seem to fit together, but it is fascinating – and as the plot takes shape it becomes quite gripping. What's more, there's obviously plenty more to come."

== Reviews ==
- Review by Carolyn Cushman (1996) in Locus, #430 November 1996
- Review by Stephen Pagel (1996) in Absolute Magnitude, Winter 1996
- Review by Susan Dunman (1997) in Science Fiction Weekly, 10 March 1997
- Review by Gwyneth Jones (1997) in Interzone, May 1997
- Review by John Clute (1997) in Interzone, May 1997
- Review by Barbara Davies (1997) in Vector 194
- Review by Michelle West (1997) in The Magazine of Fantasy & Science Fiction, September 1997
- Review by uncredited (1998) in Vector 199
- Review by Victoria Strauss (1998) in SF Site, Mid-April 1998, (1998)
- Review by Katherine Roberts (1998) in The Zone and Premonitions, Winter 1998/99
- Review [French] by Marie-Laure Vauge (2000) in Galaxies, #17
- Review by John Clute (2003) in Scores: Reviews 1993 - 2003
