= Shadowmarch =

2004 novel by Tad Williams

- US hardcover edition
- Author: Tad Williams
- Cover artist: Michael Whelan
- Language: English
- Series: Shadowmarch tetralogy
- Genre: Fantasy
- Publisher: DAW Books
- Publication date: November 2, 2004 (full)
- Publication place: United States
- Media type: Online (e-book [partial]); Print (hardcover & paperback)
- Pages: 672 (first edition, hardback)
- ISBN: 0-7564-0219-0 (first edition, hardback)
- OCLC: 56781061
- Dewey Decimal: 813/.54 22
- LC Class: PS3573.I45563 S53 2004
- Followed by: Shadowplay

Shadowmarch is a fantasy novel by American writer Tad Williams, the first book in the Shadowmarch tetralogy. It was released in hardcover on November 2, 2004, and in trade paperback on November 1, 2005. A paperback edition was released in September 2006. The second book in the series, Shadowplay was published on March 6, 2007, in hardcover and on March 4, 2008, in paperback in both the US and the UK. The third book in the series, Shadowrise, was released in hardcover on March 2, 2010. The last book in the series, Shadowheart, was published in hardcover on November 1, 2010.

== Background ==
Originally, Tad Williams conceived Shadowmarch as an idea for a fantasy movie, and later a fantasy TV series, which has been described as "Hill Street Blues meets Babylon 5 meets Lord of the Rings". When both of these options fell through, Shadowmarch was reborn as an online serial. It was later released between June 2001 and August 2002 in bi-weekly episodes, but the lack of subscribers willing to pay the one-time $14.99 fee necessary to read chapters beyond the five initial free ones meant that after the first year, the online project halted, with the completed first novel (and subsequent volumes) returning to orthodox publishing. The book contains additional chapters not found in the original online version, while the rest of the original material was substantially revised and edited for book publication (notably being rewritten completely in the past tense, since the online project used present tense to "give it a sense of immediacy").

== The Shadowmarch saga ==
- Shadowmarch, November 2004.
- Shadowplay, March 2007.
- Shadowrise, March 2010.
- Shadowheart, November 2010.

Initially, Williams set out to write a trilogy, but work on the final installment became so complex that he and his publishers decided to split the third installment into two novels, both released in 2010.

== Plot summary of series ==
The series takes place principally in the castle and province of Southmarch. Prominent sub-plots cover connected events to the south and north of Southmarch, respectively in the land of Xis and the Qar (faerie) lands beyond the impassable Shadowline. The action centers on the troubled Eddon family, the rulers of Southmarch, which is the nearest human province to the Shadowline and was formerly held by the Qar prior to their expulsion by the advancing humans.

The novel begins with the king, Olin Eddon, imprisoned in a foreign land. His eldest son Kendrick is struggling to rule in his place, while his younger twins, Barrick and Briony, struggle with their adolescent emotions. The male twin, Barrick, is particularly troubled by depression and nightmares, incited by his private knowledge of a mysterious family curse. When Kendrick is assassinated, Briony shoulders the burden of ruling in her father's absence, while Barrick slips further into maudlin self-obsession.

An army of Qar cross the Shadowline to invade Southmarch, and in the climactic battle of the first book Barrick is lost in the land of the Qar. Briony narrowly escapes death when the throne is usurped by her cousin. While Barrick travels in the Shadowlands, Briony travels around her own lands incognito, seeking allies.

Incidents in the second book elucidate that the three main religions – those of the Qar, the northern humans, and the Xixian humans – are based on a violent feud within a pantheon of gods. The three contemporary religions, though seemingly unrelated, each stem from a different perspective on the Godswar, which ended in the victory of three brothers.

The Godswar began when one of the gods married a goddess of the competing faction, prompting her father and brothers to go to war to reclaim her. It is suggested in the course of the second novel that in fact she eloped, and her father, disapproving of her choice, fought to abduct her from her beloved. Long after the end of the Godswar, a child of the losing faction staged an attack on those who won, sending them to sleep; this allowed the rise of mortal civilizations.

As Barrick travels in the lands of Qar he uncovers more of their beliefs, including that they hold both knowledge and power descended directly from their patron god, via a supernatural gift called the Fireflower.

Qar culture is revealed to center around a ruling family who are descended from one of the gods and who pass the Fireflower down through their generations. This family practices incestuous marriage, with each generation producing exactly one male and one female child. In order to preserve the Fireflower, which sustains the Qar, each generation of this family must present itself on reaching adulthood to the last remnant of a god still in the world who is trapped and barely alive in a cave deep below Southmarch Castle.

Barrick learns that unbeknownst to the contemporary Eddons, this arrangement was discreetly tolerated by the dwarf-like Funderlings until one of the Eddon ancestors met and desired the Qar princess on her pilgrimage. They married under disputed circumstances. She is remembered by the humans as a queen of Southmarch, but her Qar ancestry is forgotten.

She was, therefore, unable to marry and procreate with her brother. This broke the chain connecting the Qar to the slumbering god and began their long period of decline. Their siege of Southmarch is intended to regain control of the castle and the slumbering god beneath, in the hope of restoring their race.

On the southern continent, the powerful but insane Autarch of Xis also desires the power of the gods beneath Southmarch castle, whose existence he has deduced from ancient texts. In order to access that power he requires someone descended from a god and therefore has procured the imprisonment of King Olin Eddon. He is revealed to be behind much of the turmoil in Southmarch.

At the climax of the series, in the third and fourth novels, several factions compete for possession of Southmarch castle, and the deep caves beneath. The Autarch, who has launched a rapid marine invasion of the province; the Qar, who have tired of their siege and attempted to storm the castle; the usurper, holding the castle with his own designs on the slumbering god; and two forces loyal to the Eddons, one a large army recruited by Briony advancing on the castle to lift the siege, another consisting mainly of Funderlings holding their caves beneath the castle, initially unaware of what sleeps further below.

An eventual alliance between the Qar and the Eddon loyalists drives out the usurper but fails to prevent the Autarch from gaining access to the cave of the slumbering gods. One of the gods is woken, but easily transcends the Autarch's control. The alliance of loyalists and Qar eventually succeeds in defeating the god.

Briony Eddon is restored to her throne. Her brother Barrick, who like all Eddons is descended from the Qar royal line and had accepted the Fireflower into himself during his time with the Qar, hopes that he can restore the line his ancestor broke and allow the Qar to survive.

== Characters ==
=== Main characters ===
- Barrick Eddon – the prince of Southmarch; Briony's twin brother
- Briony Eddon – the princess of Southmarch; Barrick's twin sister
- King Olin Eddon – king of Southmarch; father of Barrick and Briony; kidnapped and held for ransom
- Chaven – the physician of the royal family
- Chert Blue-Quartz – a Funderling
- Ferras Vansen – captain of the royal guard
- Flint – a mysterious child from beyond the Shadowline; Chert Blue-Quartz's ward
- Hendon Tolly – brother of Gailon and cousin to the Eddon twins
- Qinnitan – an acolyte of the Hive in Xis
- Avin Brone – lord constable of Southmarch, unofficial advisor of the Eddon twins
- Matthias "Matty" Tinwright – a court poet to Briony Eddon
- Shaso dan-Heza – the master of arms of Castle Southmarch
- Sulepis Bishakh am-Xis III – monarch of the powerful Xandian nation of Xis, revered as a living god
- Yasammez – Qar noblewoman, known as the "Scourge of the Shivering Plain" or "Lady Porcupine"; general of the Qar armies

=== Secondary characters ===
- Kendrick Eddon – the prince regent of Southmarch
- Gailon Tolly – the duke of Summerfield, brother of Hendon and cousin to the Eddon twins
- Jeddin "Jin" – captain of the Autarch's Leopard Guard
- Prusus – Scotarch of Xis, chosen heir of Autarch Sulepis
- Puzzle – ancient court jester to the Eddons
- Queen Upsteeplebat – Rooftopper monarch

== Races ==
- Funderlings – a little people, similar to dwarves, who are skilled in stonecraft; also known as 'Delvers'.
- Rooftoppers – tiny beings who dwell on the roofs of Southmarch castle and are known only to a few.
- Skimmers – fish-like people who live mostly in seclusion from the rest of Southmarch Castle.
- Qar – an ancient non-human race who were once the inhabitants of much of the known world.
- Tuani – the dark-skinned human natives of Tuan.
- Xis – the people of the southern continent, led by an expansionist ruler.

== Awards and honors ==
- Best SF and Fantasy Books of 2004: Readers' Choice #9
- Locus Magazine 2004 Recommending Reading List 15th Best Fantasy Novel
- Nominated in 2006 for the Phantastik Preis Award (Germany), in the category of Foreign Novel
