= Otherland =

Novel series by Tad Williams

Otherland is a science fiction tetralogy by American writer Tad Williams, published between 1996 and 2001. The story is set on Earth near the end of the 21st century, probably between 2082 and 2089, in a world where technology has advanced somewhat beyond the present. The most notable advancement is the widespread availability of full-immersion virtual reality installations, which allow people from all walks of life to access an online world, called simply the Net. Tad Williams weaves an intricate plot spanning four thick volumes, and creates a picture of a future society where virtual worlds are fully integrated into everyday life.

His proposed ability to immerse oneself fully in a simulation gives him a great deal of artistic freedom, and the story winds through alternate interpretations of many classical literary works such as Through the Looking-Glass, The Odyssey and The Iliad, The War of the Worlds, Gormenghast, and The Wizard of Oz, which are available as entertainment simulations within the series. Orlando Gardiner, one of the main characters in the books, spent most of his teenage years in this world's equivalent to MMORPGs based upon J. R. R. Tolkien's fiction. The overall series's events also bear a strong resemblance to The Lord of the Rings.

The series is known for being ahead of its time. Nearly 30 years after the first books' release, the themes and technical elements of William's work have become more and more accurate.

#	Title	Pages	Chapters	Words	Audio	US release
1	City of Golden Shadow	780	--	297,499	28 h 41 min	Hardcover 1996, Paperback 1998
2	River of Blue Fire	675	--	258,867	24 h 24 min	Hardcover 1998, Paperback 1999
3	Mountain of Black Glass	749	--	275,728	27 h 17 min	Hardcover 1999, Paperback 2000
4	Sea of Silver Light	922	--	356,257	37 h 32 min	Hardcover 2001, Paperback 2002
Total		3,126	---	1,188,351	117 h 54 min	1996–2001

The story opens with Paul Jonas, a British infantryman in an apparent part of the Western Front of World War I. Wounded, he has a vivid dream in which he meets a "bird-woman", and after he wakes up, he discovers one of her feathers with him in the trenches. Realizing that the world is not as it seems, he flees, pursued by his comrades Finch and Mullet, who suddenly have different appearances. Suffering from almost complete memory loss, he begins to travel through a series of bizarre worlds, seeking answers to who he is and his connection to the bird-woman. She appears to him in several guises as he travels, and is initially one of the few things he remembers from before the trenches.

Meanwhile, in the late 21st century, technology has advanced so that the internet has become a vast Virtual Reality network. The most realistic connections to the network are achieved by using an expensive, surgically implanted bio-port interface at the back of the user's neck called a 'neurocannula'. However, around the world, children are falling victim to a disease known as Tandagore Syndrome, which in its most serious form is a deep coma from which the patient cannot wake. Irene "Renie" Sulaweyo, an instructor in "virtual engineering" at a polytechnic institute in Durban, South Africa, is devastated when her younger brother, Stephen, falls victim to this disease. She and her former San technology student ǃXabbu begin to investigate what has happened and start discovering strange goings-on in the Net, including an evil hypnotic entity and the constant reappearance of a mysterious golden city. She seeks expert assistance from a previous instructor, Susan van Bleeck. But it soon becomes apparent that she has made powerful enemies: Renie is dismissed from her job, the apartment complex where she and her unemployed father Long Joseph live is burned down, and Professor van Bleeck is murdered. Renie turns to two of van Bleeck's acquaintances: a retired security expert and hacker called "Blue Dog Anchorite" and the French researcher Martine Desroubins. Blue Dog Anchorite informs the others that Otherland, the mysterious network where the golden city is located, was specially commissioned by a cryptic organization known as the "Grail Brotherhood", comprising some of the world's wealthiest and most powerful men and women, and that he is the only surviving member of the team who devised Otherland's security, his colleagues having died in unusual circumstances. With the help of Martine and Blue Dog, Renie, ǃXabbu, Long Joseph and van Bleeck's assistant Jeremiah Dako break into Wasps' Nest, a mothballed military base in the Drakensberg which nevertheless contains equipment facilitating extended stays online. While Long Joseph and Jeremiah stay offline, she, ǃXabbu and Martine (who remains in France) break into the Otherland network to reach the golden city.

In North America, Orlando Gardiner and his friend Sam Fredericks, famous contestants in the Middle Country, a medieval fantasy gameworld, go on an apparently routine quest, where Orlando finds his own image of the golden city. While he is distracted by the image, his gaming character is killed, and he becomes obsessed with finding out what the city is and why it was shown to him. Following the trail of the city, he and Fredericks gain access to the online fringe community TreeHouse, from where they too find their way into Otherland.

Renie, ǃXabbu, Martine, Orlando and Fredericks, along with several others, find themselves in an uncomfortable situation. In the simulation world, they are held prisoner by the king of Temilún (the golden city), who is none other than Bolivar Atasco, a former member of the Grail Brotherhood. Furthermore, they are unable to drop offline, and experience terrible pain if disconnected by others. Summoned to an audience with Atasco and his wife, they meet a mysterious man named Sellars, who claims to have gathered them. Sellars gives them a mission: they are to find Paul Jonas, who is at large somewhere within Otherland's many simulation worlds. But before the briefing can finish, the Atascos' home in the real world is assaulted by assassins working for the Grail Brotherhood. Bolivar and his wife are murdered, and Sellars vanishes. Even as the group flees Temilún, one of their "sims"—simulation bodies—is secretly taken over by John Dread, a murderous young man who directed the Grail Brotherhood's assault on the Atascos and who now seeks to learn about Otherland to his own advantage.

As they try to discover the motivations of the Grail Brotherhood—obviously not world domination, since they already control the world—they discover that they are unable to log off. They are trapped, and if they die in the network, they also die in real life. The series covers their adventures as they seek to uncover the truth and wake their loved ones from their comas.

== Short stories ==
- "The Happiest Dead Boy in the World" (published in Legends II, edited by Robert Silverberg, from Del Rey/Ballantine/Random House, Hardcover 2003)
- "The Boy Detective of Oz: An Otherland Story"

== Major characters ==
=== The Volunteers ===
- Mr. Sellars—a mysterious man kept under house arrest on a US Military base. He is responsible for recruiting people to infiltrate Otherland and uncover its secrets. Although mentally tortured by the danger to which he has submitted them, he affectionately refers to them as his volunteers and tries to aid them in every way possible.
- Paul Jonas—a British man trapped in Otherland and pursued by the Grail Brotherhood for unknown reasons. He suffers from a hypnotic blocking of his memories. Both the Twins and a strange woman (whom he dubs the Angel) seem to be seeking him out, but for very different purposes.
- Irene (Renie) Sulaweyo—a South African Zulu woman and a college professor in Durban. After her younger brother, to whom she is a surrogate mother, falls into a coma, she begins a search for answers. Renie is headstrong, and other characters constantly refer to her tendency towards action over contemplation.
- ǃXabbu—a Kalahari San and a friend of Renie. He was originally Renie's student, learning how to control virtual reality from her in order to create a simulation that would preserve his dying culture. He is known for his ability to tell engaging folktales that offer new insights into situations.
- Orlando Gardiner—a young boy suffering from progeria who is drawn to Otherland while playing a virtual reality MMORPG called Middle Country, in which he is the Barbarian hero Thargor.
- Salome (Sam) Fredericks—Orlando's best friend, though the two have never met in person. In Middle Country, Sam goes under the alias of Pithlit the thief. Though Sam is actually female, she uses exclusively male aliases, leading to a lot of confusion about her real gender.
- Martine Desroubins—a blind French researcher who is able to sense the online world through a complex synesthesia, around which she has built her personal machine. Though deprived of sight, she is often able to sense things that her companions cannot.
- Singh—Known better by the name "Blue Dog Anchorite", who is the only surviving member of the group of technicians that designed Otherland and a well-known member of Treehouse.
- Florimel—A German woman who is just as strong-willed as Renie, although not as forthright with her story and motivation.
- Quan Li—A Chinese grandmother who sought out answers after her granddaughter fell into a coma.
- Sweet William-an elderly British man wearing the avatar of a vampire. He and Martine seem to know each other. Like Florimel, he is also silent about his personal life.
- Javier "T4b" Rodgers—a goggleboy who speaks in badly mangled net-slang and wears the armor of a robot or a space-age warrior. Like Florimel and Sweet William, he does not volunteer any information—not that anyone except Orlando and Fredericks could understand him even if he did. He is a suspected charge-head—someone who takes data-based drugs.

=== The Grail Brotherhood and associates ===
- Félix Jongleur (Osiris)—the wealthy head of the Grail Brotherhood, a powerful organization that employs assassins in order to guard its secrecy. The oldest living man, his motives remain unclear.
- Robert Wells (Ptah)—head of the Telemorphix Corporation and one of the wealthiest men in the world. He tries to wrest power from Jongleur.
- Daniel Yacoubian (Horus)—A US Military general who is involved in the power plays in the Grail Brotherhood.
- Jiun Bhao (Thoth)—a wealthy Asian businessman who is second in power only to Jongleur.
- Ricardo Klement (Khepera)- the first member to attempt the grail process.
- Johnny "Dread" Wulgaru (Anubis)—a half-Aboriginal Australian psychopath obsessed with rape and murder, employed as an assassin by the Grail Brotherhood. He possesses the ability to mentally interfere with machines, allowing him to do many seemingly impossible things. He refers to this ability as his twist.
- Dulcinea (Dulcie) Anwin—an associate of Dread's whose specialty is hacking through security systems and gaining information. After the events of the Sky God Project, she is drawn into the events surrounding Dread and Otherland.
- Hideki Kunohara—a Japanese man of unknown allegiances who nevertheless owns private space on the Otherland network.
- Bolivar Atasco (Shu)—A Colombian man who contributed to the Otherland Network in order to build a simulation in which Meso-America became a world power. He agreed to work with Sellars behind the Grail Brotherhood's backs.

=== Inside Otherland ===
- The Other—the strange entity that is the secret and backbone of Otherland.
- The Twins—two men, one monstrously fat and the other painfully skinny, who appear in different incarnations throughout the network. They pursue Paul Jonas relentlessly.
- The Angel—a woman who also appears in different incarnations. She seems to have a particular affinity for Paul Jonas, although she also appears to other characters to give them guidance.
- Gally—a young boy who travels with Paul. He is neither a puppet (non-sentient character) nor a citizen (a human wearing an avatar).
- Azador—a Romany so stereotypical that he is almost amusing. He knows a great deal about the Otherland network, although he is unwilling to share his information.
- Emily 22813—a young woman originally thought to be a puppet who nonetheless is able to cross world boundaries. She is pregnant, and she claims that Azador is the father.
- Nandi Paradivash-an Indian man, a devotee of Krishna, and a member of the Circle, a secret organization of people from all faiths at odds with the Grail Brotherhood.
- Bonita Mae Simpkins-an African American woman, a Christian, and a member of the Circle.

=== In the real world ===
- Long Joseph Sulaweyo—Renie's father, an alcoholic and terribly incapable of managing his life.
- Jeremiah Dako—the former housekeeper of Susan Van Bleeck who joins Renie and her father after Susan is murdered. He and Joseph do not get along but are forced to make common cause with one another.
- Del Ray Chiume—Renie's ex-boyfriend, an employee of the UN. Renie goes to him asking for help, unaware of what the help will cost him.
- Decatur (Catur) Ramsey—a lawyer under the employ of Sam Fredericks's parents. He begins to research Tandagore Syndrome and eventually ends up uniting people for common causes in the real world.
- Beezle Bug—a cartoon bug-shaped piece of data-retrieval gear owned by Orlando that shows remarkable reasoning skills and a level of intelligence that approaches sentience.
- Olga Pirofsky—One of the many actors for the Net-based interactive character Uncle Jingle. She is a widow, having lost her husband and son about 30 years prior to the beginning of the series. While working as Uncle Jingle, she begins having headaches. As she researches Tandagore Syndrome, which she suspects she has, she begins to learn of the children who are falling into comas around the world.
- Calliope Skouros—a Greek-Australian detective who is assigned a 5-year old unsolvable murder case. As she researches, she begins to notice similarities between this murder and the MO of a famous serial killer (Dread).
- Christabel Sorensen—a girl of approximately 7 or 8 years who has a special friendship with the strange old man Mr. Sellars. She is unaware that Sellars is under house arrest, and willingly helps him with his plans.
- Cho-Cho—a 10-year-old street boy of Mexican descent who sneaks onto the army base while Christabel is trying to help Mr. Sellars. He becomes involved with Sellars's experiments.

== Adaptations ==
=== Video game ===
On October 1, 2008, RealU and dtp entertainment announced that they were developing a massively multiplayer online game (MMO) based on the novels. The Otherland MMO was scheduled to be released in Europe and North America in 2012. However, after dtp entertainment (RealU's parent company) entered insolvency, RealU confirmed that it was laying off its staff and that development on the Otherland game was cancelled.

On October 9, 2014, Drago Entertainment revealed that it had taken over the game's development. The game was preparing for early access through Steam in August 2015, but the release was postponed until September 10 due to bug problems in the U.S. and German servers. After releasing through Steam Early Access, Otherland's development woes continued. The game was removed from the Steam store due to alleged technical issues on January 28, 2016. The game became available again on October 4, 2016. Servers for the game were shut down permanently on September 23, 2021.

=== Film and TV ===
In January 2012, Warner Bros. acquired the film rights to the Otherland novels. The producer of the planned feature film was set to be Dan Lin, and the script was to be written by John Scott III.

On December 13, 2023, it was reported that the book series is being developed as a TV series produced by Mike Weber.

== See also ==
=== Influences ===
- German Power metal band Blind Guardian has composed a song titled "Otherland", which is dedicated to the series, on its 2006 album A Twist in the Myth.

=== Science and technology ===
- Mind transfer
- Second Life
- Simulated reality
- Transhumanism
- Virtual reality
