= Tailchaser's Song =

1985 fantasy novel by Tad Williams

- US Hardcover Edition
- Author: Tad Williams
- Cover artist: Michael Embden (1985); Braldt Bralds (1986)
- Language: English
- Genre: Fantasy
- Publisher: DAW Books
- Publication date: November 21, 1985
- Publication place: United States
- Media type: Print (Hardback and Paperback)
- Pages: 333 (Hardback) & 400 (Paperback)
- ISBN: 0-8099-0002-5 (Hardback) & ISBN 0-88677-953-7 (Paperback)
- OCLC: 12799359
- Dewey Decimal: 813/.54 19
- LC Class: PS3573.I45563 T35 1985

Tailchaser's Song is a fantasy novel by American writer Tad Williams. First released on November 21, 1985, it is Williams' first published work.

The story focuses on a personified cat named Fritti Tailchaser, set in a world of other anthropomorphic animals who live in their natural environments but each have their own language, mythology, and culture.

It is reportedly being adapted into an animated feature film, although as of 2023 no additional updates have been announced.

== Plot summary ==
The book begins with a summary of the cats' creation myth. Meerclar Allmother, the creator of all other beings, brought forth the first pair of cats, the divine figures Harar Goldeneye and Fela Skydancer. Their first litter were also divine. Their jealous middle child, Grizraz Hearteater, created a monstrous hound and set it to attack all cats. The eldest child, Viror Whitewind, was killed fighting it. Hearteater fled underground, while Whitewind's death caused his father to flee to the heavens and made his mother permanently silent. The youngest brother, Tangaloor Firefoot, renounced his claim to the throne and fled out of grief.

After this introduction, a ginger tomcat named Fritti Tailchaser sets out in search of his friend Hushpad after other cats strangely disappear. With the help of the kitten Pouncequick, he sets out on a journey to visit the feline royal Court of Harar and solve the mystery of the disappearances. They meet a crazy cat named Eatbugs, who travels with them. In the wild they run into some Firstwalkers, cats who are of a direct bloodline from Goldeneye and Skydancer. Their thane (leader), Quiverclaw, challenges Tailchaser and is impressed enough to allow him and Pouncequick to accompany them for a short time.

The protagonists make their way to the Court, where they are treated there with indifference. They meet a new ally, Roofshadow, but are captured and taken underground to Vastnir, where Grizraz Hearteater plots to take over the world. Tailchaser escapes with Roofshadow's help but feels guilty that his friends are still trapped. He returns with Quiverclaw and Prince Fencewalker, a court cat, to come to the rescue. Hearteater creates the Fikos, a powerful dog-like monster. Tailchaser takes advantage of the chaos to rescue Pouncequick, Eatbugs, and Roofshadow, but Eatbugs is lost on the way out. While Roofshadow and Pouncequick escape, Tailchaser goes back to find Eatbugs. He discovers Eatbugs in a deathlike state. Upon Tailchaser's uttering a prayer to Tangaloor Firefoot, Eatbugs awakens, revealing himself to be Firefoot in disguise. Tailchaser runs out of Vastnir at Firefoot's urging, while Firefoot goes to deal with Hearteater, resulting in Vastnir's destruction.

Pouncequick and Roofshadow decide to return home, so Tailchaser is left alone. Firefoot appears to him in a dream, confirms that Hearteater's power is gone, and encourages Tailchaser to continue his quest for Hushpad. He finds his way to the island Villa-on-Mar. There he finds Hushpad, who now lives with the humans and wishes to stay. Tailchaser realizes that he is still a feral cat and cannot be with her. The book ends with him setting out to return home.

The ending may be seen only as the beginning of a longer saga, but there have been no follow-ups or sequels to date.

== Folklore and Language ==
The cats of Tailchaser's Song have a well established system of songs, poems, and mythology. The cats, as one brethren, call themselves 'the Folk'. The novel contains a developed system of cat speech and style as well, to go with their customs.

Tad Williams has come up with a very large variety of terms, called the Higher Singing, used by the cats to express themselves and explain things. Included in the book is a complete glossary, as well as a character 'directory' and a map of Tailchaser's world. Also included are Williams' notes on pronunciation, which apply not only to spoken words but to first names as well (such as Fritti, Harar, or Meerclar): "'C' is always pronounced 'S': thus, Meerclar is pronounced 'Mere-slar.' In the instances where an 'S' has been used, it is only to clarify the pronunciation. For example, I felt that 'Vicl,' although the true spelling, was a little boggling; hence, 'Visl'. 'F' has a soft 'fth' sound. Vowels tend to conform to Latinate 'ah-eh-ih-oh-ooh.'"

The name Meerclar itself originates from the novelette "The Flame Bringers" by Michael Moorcock, 1962. In the story, Meerclar is not a goddess but god. He was called as "Lord of the Cats" or "Protector of the Feline Kind".

== Adaptations ==
In November 2011, it was announced that Animetropolis is developing a computer-animated film adaptation, with International Digital Artists, the producer of Cat Shit One, animating it.

Tailchaser's Song was announced to be released in the United States sometime after 2018, with Peter Ramsey, the director of Rise of the Guardians, set to be the executive producer. As of 2026, no trailers or updates on production have been announced.

== Reception ==
Kirkus Reviews criticized the book for borrowing from other books in the fantasy genre which causes it to fail to "distract the reader from the shameless falsity of the characterizations." Publishers Weekly kept their review curt, stating "Williams's first novel should engage the fancy of cat lovers."

== See also ==
- Warriors (novel series) - A novel series with a similar premise
