= Memory, Sorrow, and Thorn =

Fantasy novel trilogy by Tad Williams

The Dragonbone Chair, first novel in the epic saga of Memory, Sorrow, and Thorn.

Memory, Sorrow, and Thorn is a trilogy of epic fantasy novels by American writer Tad Williams, comprising The Dragonbone Chair (1988), Stone of Farewell (1990), and To Green Angel Tower (1993).

Memory, Sorrow, and Thorn takes place on the fictional continent of Osten Ard, comprising several united countries. Williams used several characters, both protagonist and antagonist, as point of view characters throughout the novels, presenting the reader with an assortment of disparate and subjective viewpoints.

A novelette set in the world of Osten Ard, The Burning Man, was released in 1998 and later published as a graphic novel. A sequel tetralogy, The Last King of Osten Ard, began publication in 2017, following 2017's The Heart of What Was Lost. A prequel to the entirety of Osten Ard, Brothers of the Wind was published in 2021.

== Plot synopsis ==
Memory, Sorrow, and Thorn takes place on the fictional continent of Osten Ard, home to several united races, including humans, elf-like immortals known as Sithi, and dwarf-like mountain-dwellers named Qanuc. Most of these races have been living in relative unity for decades, thanks to King John the Presbyter (also known as Prester John), who is known to have slain a dragon. When the first novel opens Prester John's health in his advanced age is failing and his sons, Elias and Josua, quarrel over who will ascend to the throne. Meanwhile, a dark secret held by Prester John, and the ambitions of a priest named Pryrates, threaten the stability of the continent. Williams used several characters, both villain and protagonist, as point of view characters throughout the scope of the novels.

The series primarily follows Simon, a lowly kitchen scullion in Hayholt Castle, as he undergoes tutelage from Doctor Morgenes and is cared for by Rachel "the Dragon", the matriarch of the castle's kitchen and chambermaids. When King John dies, Elias takes the throne with the mysterious priest Pryrates as his advisor; Josua mysteriously disappears and the seasons begin changing, bringing bitter winters and drought-laden summers. Simon, ever the mischievous adventurer, accidentally uncovers some of Pryrates' true nature and becomes wrapped into a conspiracy that threatens not only his country of Erkynland, but Osten Ard itself.

== Publication history ==
#	Title	Pages	Chapters	Words (est)	Audio	US release
1	The Dragonbone Chair	672	44	288,695	33h 53m	October 1988
2	Stone of Farewell	589	28	282,750	32h 36m	August 1990
3	To Green Angel Tower	1083	60	550,275	63h 15m	March 1993
	Total	2,344	132	1,121,720	129h 44m	

To Green Angel Tower's paperback edition is presented in two parts due to its sheer size, totaling nearly 1600 pages in length. Parts 1 and 2 were subtitled Siege and Storm, respectively, in their United Kingdom pressings.

== Reception ==
A nationwide bestseller in the United States, Memory, Sorrow, and Thorn was well received by book critics. Of Stone of Farewell, Locus called it "an epic fantasy you can get lost in for days, not just hours". Publishers Weekly said that Stone of Farewell is a "panoramic, vigorous, often moving sequel to The Dragonbone Chair". Of the series, Amaranth Magazine said, "This is quite simply the best story I have read next to LORD OF THE RINGS…destined to become among the greatest Fantasy epics of all time."

The series was recommended by Ross Douthat during the New York Times podcast The Argument on April 4, 2019.

== Legacy ==
American author George R. R. Martin has praised Memory, Sorrow, and Thorn, citing it as a key influence on his own epic high fantasy novel series, A Song of Ice and Fire. American author Christopher Paolini, writer of The Inheritance Cycle, also cited Memory, Sorrow and Thorn as an influence, calling it "one of the great fantasy epics of all time."
