= Tad Williams =

American fantasy and science fiction writer

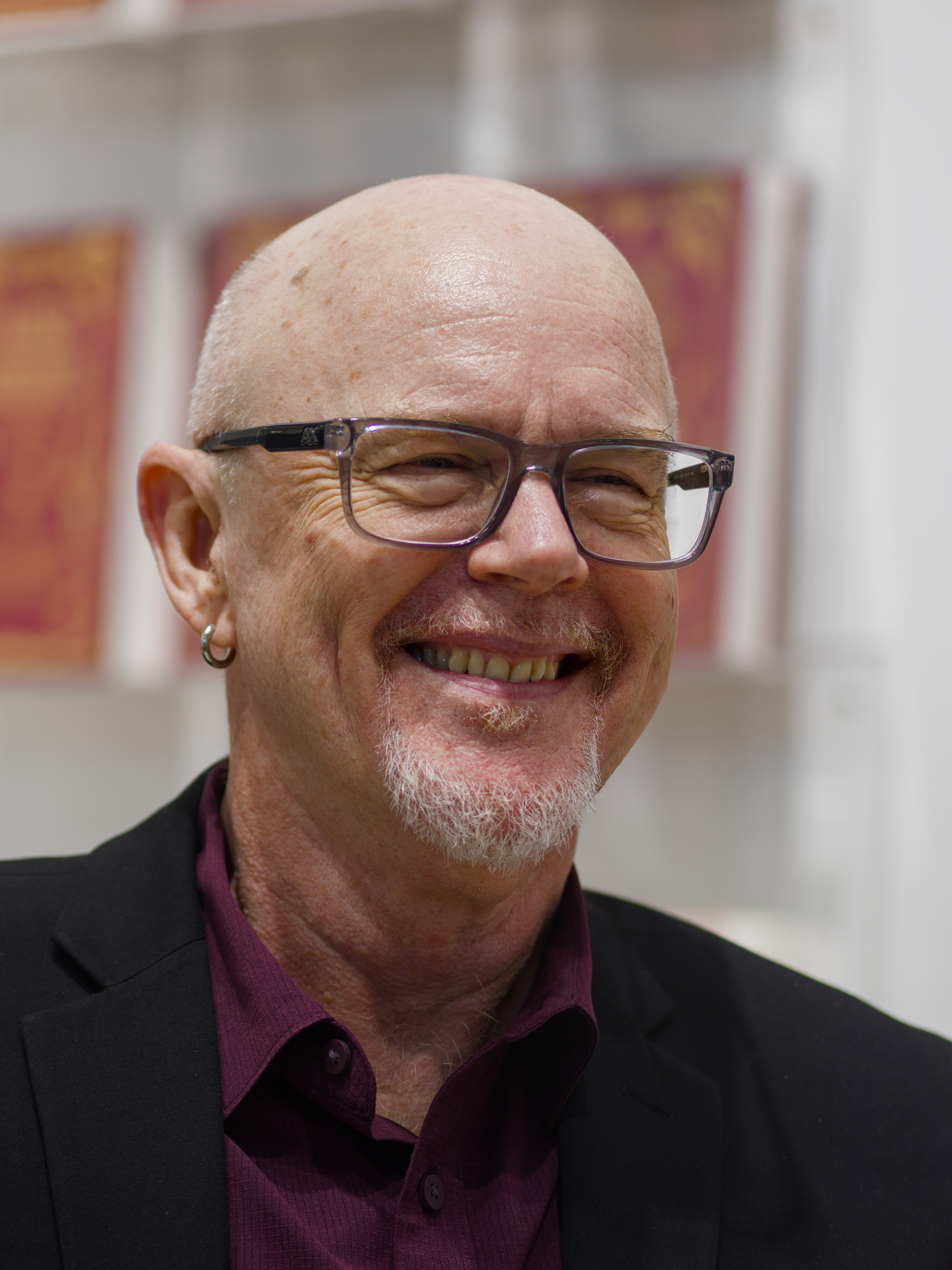
- Williams in 2019
- Born: Robert Paul Williams; March 14, 1957 (age 69); San Jose, California, U.S.
- Occupations: Storyteller, novelist, short story writer, comics writer and essayist
- Spouse: Deborah Beale
- Writing career
- Genres: Post-modernism; High fantasy Urban fantasy Dark fantasy Science fiction Horror fiction
- Notable works: Tailchaser's Song; Memory, Sorrow, and Thorn; Otherland; Shadowmarch
- Website: www.tadwilliams.com

Robert Paul "Tad" Williams (born March 14, 1957) is an American fantasy and science fiction writer. He is the author of the multivolume Memory, Sorrow, and Thorn series, Otherland series, Shadowmarch series, and The Bobby Dollar series, as well as the standalone novels Tailchaser's Song and The War of the Flowers. Most recently, Williams published The Last King of Osten Ard series, with its final novel The Navigator's Children being published in 2024. More than 17 million copies of Williams' works have been sold.

Williams's work in comics includes a six issue mini-series for DC Comics called The Next. He also wrote Aquaman: Sword of Atlantis issue #50 to #57. Other comic work includes Mirrorworld: Rain and The Helmet of Fate: Ibis the Invincible #1 (DC).

Williams is collaborating on a series of young-adult books with his wife, Deborah Beale, called The Ordinary Farm Adventures. The first two books in the series are The Dragons of Ordinary Farm and The Secrets of Ordinary Farm. The in-progress third book is under the current title The Heirs of Ordinary Farm and does not have a release date yet.

== Early life and career ==
Robert Paul "Tad" Williams was born in San Jose, California, on March 14, 1957. He grew up in Palo Alto, the town that grew up around Stanford University. He attended Palo Alto Senior High School. His family was close, and he and his brothers were always encouraged in their creativity. His mother gave him the nickname "Tad" after the young characters in Walt Kelly's comic strip Pogo. The semi-autobiographical character Pogo Cashman, who appears in some of his stories, is a reference to the nickname.

Before becoming a full time fiction author Williams held many jobs including delivering newspapers, food service, DJ and station music director for college radio station KFJC, shoe sales, branch manager of a financial institution, writing for the TheatreWorks company and drawing military manuals.

Williams also worked for Apple, developing an interest in interactive multi-media. He and his colleague Andrew Harris created a company, Telemorphix, in order to produce it. The result was "M. Jack Steckel's 21st Century Vaudeville", which was broadcast on San Francisco Bay Area local TV in 1992 and 1993.

In addition, he created "Valley Vision," a TV series concept, a show about a local TV station. A pilot was shot featuring several people who would go on to become Bay Area acting alumni, including Greg Proops, Mike McShane, Joan Mankin, Marga Gomez and several members of the San Francisco Mime Troupe.

In his mid twenties, he turned to writing and submitted the manuscript of his novel Tailchaser's Song to DAW Books. To get his publishers to look at his first manuscript he spun a story about needing a replacement copy because his had been destroyed. It worked. DAW Books liked it and published it, beginning a long association that continues to this day. Williams continued working various jobs for a few more years, including three years from 1987 to 1990 as a technical writer at Apple Computer's Knowledge Engineering Department, taking problem-solving field material from engineers and turning it into research articles (which led, in part, to the Otherland books), before making fiction writing his full-time career.

== Writing and influences ==
Writing long stories was an early hallmark for Williams. "I remember specifically one 'folktale' assignment when I was thirteen that was supposed to be three pages, and I wound up writing a seventeen-page sword-and-sorcery epic with illustrations, etc." His first attempt at professional writing was "a rather awful science-fiction screenplay called The Sad Machines that I've never shown to anyone outside my family, I think. The only interesting thing about it now is that its main character, Ishmael Parks, was a definite precursor to Simon in the Osten Ard books."

Williams traces his interest in the science fiction and fantasy genre back to the books his mother read to him when he was a child, and that he later read to himself: E. Nesbit, The Wind in the Willows, and of course Tolkien.

The biggest single influence on me was reading The Lord of the Rings when I was about eleven. I think it was the idea of created worlds and imaginary history that grabbed me. I was also very influenced by Jack Kirby and Stan Lee's early Marvel Comics and by Dickens. And later, Gravity's Rainbow knocked my socks off and made me want to be a grown-up writer. Art, theatre and music are a whole different set of influences. Jason and the Argonauts, The Tin Drum, and Performance all got into my brain, just for instance.

A long list of authors have influenced and inspired Williams's work: Ray Bradbury, Theodore Sturgeon, Fritz Leiber, Michael Moorcock, Roger Zelazny, Harlan Ellison, Kurt Vonnegut, Ursula K. Le Guin, Hunter S. Thompson, Thomas Pynchon, J. D. Salinger, William Butler Yeats, Wallace Stevens, Barbara Tuchman, Philip K. Dick, Ruth Rendell, James Tiptree Jr. (Alice Sheldon), Jane Austen, T. S. Eliot, Jorge Luis Borges, Patrick O'Brian, Roald Dahl, Dr. Seuss (Theodor Geisel), A. A. Milne, J. J. Norwich, Stephen Jay Gould, John Updike, Thomas Berger, Raymond Chandler, William Shakespeare, and James Thurber.

Williams has also had an influence on other authors in his genre. His Memory, Sorrow, and Thorn series was one of the works that inspired George R. R. Martin to write A Song of Ice and Fire. "I read Tad and was impressed by him, but the imitators that followed—well, fantasy got a bad rep for being very formulaic and ritual. And I read The Dragonbone Chair and said, 'My god, they can do something with this form,' and it's Tad doing it. It's one of my favorite fantasy series." Martin incorporated a nod to Williams in A Game of Thrones with "House Willum": The only members of the house mentioned are Lord Willum and his two sons, Josua and Elyas, a reference to the royal brothers in The Dragonbone Chair.

In "Tad Williams: The American Tolkien?" Ash Silverlock observes that "echoes of Williams's work" can be seen in the works of Robin Hobb, Terry Goodkind and Robert Jordan. Blake Charlton, Christopher Paolini, and Patrick Rothfuss have also indicated they've been inspired by Williams.

== Family life ==
Williams and his wife and partner Deborah Beale live in Northern California with their two children and "far more cats, dogs, turtles, pet ants and banana slugs than they can count."
