= Patricia A. McKillip bibliography =

Bibliography of fantasy and science fiction writer Patricia A. McKillip:

Not all of these ISBNs are for first editions.

== The Riddle-Master trilogy ==
Name	Published	ISBN	Notes
The Riddle-Master of Hed	1976	ISBN 0-7088-8051-7	
Heir of Sea and Fire	1977	ISBN 0-7088-8050-9	
Harpist in the Wind	1979	ISBN 0-7088-8052-5	Locus Award winner (Best Fantasy Novel), 1980; World Fantasy Award nominee, 1980; Hugo Award nominee, 1980

Omnibus editions (all 3 books):

Name	Published	ISBN	Notes
Riddle of Stars	1979	ISBN 0-2839-8579-8	Science Fiction Book Club edition, October, 1979
Quest of Riddlemasters	1982	ISBN 0-345-26198-4	
The Quest of the Riddlemaster	1983	ISBN 0-345-29089-5	
Riddle-Master	1999	ISBN 0-441-00596-9	
The Riddle-Master's Game	2001	ISBN 1-85798-796-9	Fantasy Masterworks series

== The Cygnet series ==
Name	Published	ISBN	Notes
The Sorceress and the Cygnet	1991	ISBN 0-441-77564-0	Mythopoeic Fantasy Award finalist, 1992
The Cygnet and the Firebird	1993	ISBN 0-441-12628-6	Mythopoeic Fantasy Award finalist, 1994
Cygnet	2007	ISBN 0-441-01483-6	Omnibus edition (both books)

== Kyreol series ==
Name	Published	ISBN	Notes
Moon-Flash	1984	ISBN 0-689-31049-8	
The Moon and the Face	1985	ISBN 0-689-31158-3	
Moon-Flash	2005	ISBN 0-14-240301-6	Omnibus edition (both books)

== Winter Rose duology ==
Name	Published	ISBN	Notes
Winter Rose	1996	ISBN 0-441-00334-6	Nebula Award nominee, 1996; Locus Fantasy Award nominee, 1997; Mythopoeic Fantasy Award finalist, 1997
Solstice Wood	2006	ISBN 0-441-01366-X	Mythopoeic Fantasy Award winner, 2007

== Other works ==
Name	Published	ISBN	Notes
The House on Parchment Street	1973	ISBN 0-689-70451-8	
The Throme of the Erril of Sherill	1973	ISBN 0-441-80839-5	
The Forgotten Beasts of Eld	1974	ISBN 0-380-00480-1	World Fantasy Award winner 1975; Mythopoeic Fantasy Award finalist, 1975
The Night Gift	1976	ISBN 0-689-70470-4	
Stepping From the Shadows	1982	ISBN 0-425-07107-3	
Fool's Run	1987	ISBN 0-356-14394-5	Science Fiction
The Changeling Sea	1988	ISBN 0-689-31436-1	Mythopoeic Fantasy Award finalist 1990
Something Rich and Strange ("A Tale of Brian Froud's Faerielands")	1994	ISBN 0-553-09674-5	Mythopoeic Fantasy Award winner, 1995
The Book of Atrix Wolfe	1995	ISBN 0-441-00211-0	Mythopoeic Fantasy Award finalist, 1996
Song for the Basilisk	1998	ISBN 0-441-00447-4	Mythopoeic Fantasy Award finalist, 1999
The Tower at Stony Wood	2000	ISBN 0-441-00733-3	Nebula Award nominee, 2001
Ombria in Shadow	2002	ISBN 0-441-00733-3	World Fantasy Award winner, Best Novel 2003
In the Forests of Serre	2003	ISBN 0-441-01011-3	Mythopoeic Fantasy Award finalist, 2004
Alphabet of Thorn	2004	ISBN 0-441-01130-6	Mythopoeic Fantasy Award finalist, 2005
Od Magic	2005	ISBN 0-441-01248-5	World Fantasy Award nominee, Best Novel 2006
Harrowing the Dragon	2005	ISBN 0-441-01248-5	short stories
The Bell at Sealey Head	2008	ISBN 0-441-01630-8	Mythopoeic Fantasy Award finalist, 2009; Locus Award nominee, 2009
The Bards of Bone Plain	2010	ISBN 0-441-01957-9	Mythopoeic Fantasy Award finalist, 2011
Wonders of the Invisible World	2012	ISBN 978-1-61696-087-2	short stories; published by Tachyon Publications
Kingfisher	2016	ISBN 978-0-425-27176-6	Mythopoeic Fantasy Award winner, 2017
Dreams of Distant Shores	2016	ISBN 978-1-61696-218-0	short stories; published by Tachyon Publications
The Essential Patricia A. McKillip	2025	ISBN 978-1-61696-448-1	short stories; published by Tachyon Publications

== Short stories ==
The short stories and the publications in which they appear under them.

Name	Published	Publication	Notes
"The Throme of the Erril of Sherill"	1973	The Throme of the Erril of Sherill (1973, 1984)	Novella.
"Untitled Play: An Excerpt"	1981	A Fantasy Reader (1981)	
"The Harrowing of the Dragon of Hoarsbreath"	1982	Elsewhere Vol II (1982); The Throme of the Erril of Sherill (1984); Harrowing the Dragon (2005); The Essential Patricia A. McKillip (2025)	
"A Matter of Music"	1984	Elsewhere Vol III (1984); Harrowing the Dragon (2005)	
"A Troll and Two Roses"	1985	Faery! (1985); Harrowing the Dragon (2005)	
"The Old Woman and the Storm"	1985	Imaginary Lands (1985); Wonders of the Invisible World (2012)	
"Baba Yaga and the Sorcerer's Son"	1986	Dragons and Dreams (1986); Harrowing the Dragon (2005)	
"The Doorkeeper of Khaat"	1989	Full Spectrum 2 (1989); Wonders of the Invisible World (2012)	
"Fortune's Children"	1990	Tales of the Witch World 3 (1990)	
"Moby James"	1991	2041: Twelve Short Stories About the Future (1991); Holt Anthology of Science Fiction (2000)	
"The Fellowship of the Dragon"	1992	After the King (1992); Harrowing the Dragon (2005)	
"The Snow Queen"	1993	Snow White, Blood Red (1993); The Years Best Fantasy and Horror: Seventh Annual Collection (1994); Harrowing the Dragon (2005)	
"The Stranger"	1993	Temporary Walls (1993); Harrowing the Dragon (2005); The Essential Patricia A. McKillip (2025)	
"Xmas Cruise"	1993	Christmas Forever (1993); Wonders of the Invisible World (2012)	
"Lady of the Skulls"	1993	Strange Dreams (1993); The Year's Best Fantasy and Horror: Seventh Annual Collection (1994); Harrowing the Dragon (2005); The Secret History of Fantasy edited by Peter S. Beagle (2010); The Essential Patricia A. McKillip (2025)	
"Ash, Wood, Fire"	1993	The Women's Press Book of New Myth and Magic (1993); Harrowing the Dragon (2005)	
"Transmutations"	1994	Xanadu 2 (1994); The Years Best Fantasy and Horror: Eighth Annual Collection (1995); Harrowing the Dragon (2005)	
"The Lion and the Lark"	1995	The Armless Maiden (1995); The Years Best Fantasy and Horror: Ninth Annual Collection (1996); Harrowing the Dragon (2005); The Essential Patricia A. McKillip (2025)	
"Wonders of the Invisible World"	1995	Full Spectrum 5 (1995); Year's Best SF (1996); Wonders of the Invisible World (2012); The Essential Patricia A. McKillip (2025)	
"The Witches of Junket"	1996	Sisters in Fantasy 2 (1996); Harrowing the Dragon (2005); The Essential Patricia A. McKillip (2025)	
"Star-Crossed"	1997	Shakespearean Whodunits (1997); Harrowing the Dragon (2005)	
"Oak Hill"	1998	The Essential Bordertown (1998); The Year's Best Fantasy and Horror: Twelfth Annual Collection (1999); Wonders of the Invisible World (2012)	
"Toad"	1999	Silver Birch, Blood Moon (1999); Harrowing the Dragon (2005)	
"A Gift to Be Simple"	1999	Not of Woman Born (1999); Wonders of the Invisible World (2012)	
"Voyage into the Heart"	1999	Voyages, The 25th WFC (1999); Harrowing the Dragon (2005)	
"The Twelve Dancing Princesses"	2000	A Wolf at the Door and Other Retold Fairy Tales (2000); Wonders of the Invisible World (2012)	
"Hunter's Moon"	2002	The Green Man: Tales from the Mythic Forest (2002); Wonders of the Invisible World (2012); The Essential Patricia A. McKillip (2025)	
"Byndley"	2003	Firebirds (2003); Wonders of the Invisible World (2012); The Essential Patricia A. McKillip (2025)	
"Out of the Woods"	2004	Flights (2004); Wonders of the Invisible World (2012); The Essential Patricia A. McKillip (2025)	
"Undine"	2004	The Faery Reel: Tales from the Twilight Realm (2004); Wonders of the Invisible World (2012); The Essential Patricia A. McKillip (2025)	
"The Gorgon in the Cupboard"	2004	To Weave a Web of Magic (2004); Dreams of Distant Shores (2016); The Essential Patricia A. McKillip (2025)	Novella.
"The Kelpie"	2005	The Fair Folk (2005); Wonders of the Invisible World (2012)	
"Jack O'Lantern"	2006	Firebirds Rising (2006); Wonders of the Invisible World (2012); The Essential Patricia A. McKillip (2025)	
"Naming Day"	2007	Dark Alchemy (2007); Wonders of the Invisible World (2012)	
"The Fortune-Teller"	2007	The Coyote Road: Trickster Tales (2007); Wonders of the Invisible World (2012); The Essential Patricia A. McKillip (2025)	
"Knight of the Well"	2008	A Book of Wizards (2008); Wonders of the Invisible World (2012); The Essential Patricia A. McKillip (2025)	
"Which Witch"	2012	Under My Hat (2012); Dreams of Distant Shores (2016)	
"Weird"	2014	Unconventional Fantasy (2014); Dreams of Distant Shores (2016); The Essential Patricia A. McKillip (2025)	
"Alien"	2016	Dreams of Distant Shores (2016)	
"Edith and Henry Go Motoring"	2016	Dreams of Distant Shores (2016)	
"Mer"	2016	Dreams of Distant Shores (2016); The Essential Patricia A. McKillip (2025)	
"Unicorn Triangle"	2017	The Karkadann Triangle (2018); The Unicorn Anthology (2019)	
"Camouflage"	2020	The Book of Dragons (2020)	
