= Tähtifantasia Award =

Annual Finnish science fiction and fantasy award

Tähtifantasia Award is an annual prize by Helsingin science fiction seura ry for the best foreign fantasy book released in Finland.

== Recipients ==
Tähtifantasia Award winners and shortlists
Year	Author	Title	Result	Ref.
2007	Jeff VanderMeer	Pyhimysten ja mielipuolten kaupunki (City of Saints and Madmen)	Winner	
2007	George R. R. Martin	Miekkamyrsky 2 (A Storm of Swords, part 2)	Shortlist	
2007	Jonathan Carroll	Valkoiset omenat (White Apples)	Shortlist	
2007	Jukka Halme (editor)	Uuskummaa?	Shortlist	
2007	Patricia A. McKillip	Unohdettu Ombria (Ombria in Shadow)	Shortlist	
2008	Ngũgĩ wa Thiong'o	Variksen Velho (Wizard of the Crow)	Winner	
2008	J. R. R. Tolkien	Húrinin lasten tarina (The Children of Húrin)	Shortlist	
2008	Lord Dunsany	Haltiamaan kuninkaantytär (The King of Elfland's Daughter)	Shortlist	
2008	Scott Lynch	Locke Lamoran valheet (The Lies of Locke Lamora)	Shortlist	
2008	Sean Stewart	Matkijalintu (Mockingbird)	Shortlist	
2009	Ellen Kushner	Thomas Riiminiekka (Thomas the Rhymer)	Winner	
2009	Gregory Maguire	Noita (Wicked)	Shortlist	
2009	José Saramago	Oikukas kuolema (As Intermitências da Morte)	Shortlist	
2009	Patricia A. McKillip	Basiliskin laulu (Song for the Basilisk)	Shortlist	
2009	Robert Silverberg	Kuningas Gilgameš (Gilgamesh the King)	Shortlist	
2010	Haruki Murakami	Kafka rannalla (Kafka on the Shore)	Winner	
2010	Joe Abercrombie	Ase itse (The Blade Itself)	Shortlist	
2010	Joe Hill	Bobby Conroy palaa kuolleista ja muita kertomuksia (20th Century Ghosts)	Shortlist	
2010	Jorge Luis Borges	Kuvitteellisten olentojen kirja (The Book of Imaginary Beings)	Shortlist	
2010	Ursula K. Le Guin	Lavinia	Shortlist	
2011	Andrzej Sapkowski	Viimeinen toivomus (The Last Wish)	Winner	
2011	Mari Strachan	Hiljaisuus soi H-mollissa (The Earth Hums In B Flat)	Shortlist	
2011	Patrick Rothfuss	Tuulen nimi (The Name of the Wind)	Shortlist	
2011	Terry Pratchett	Yövartiosto (Night Watch)	Shortlist	
2011	Steph Swainston	Kuolemattomien kaarti (The Year of Our War)	Winner	
2012	Andrzej Sapkowski	Kohtalon miekka (Sword of Destiny)	Winner	
2012	Ali Shaw	Tyttö joka muuttui lasiksi (The Girl with Glass Feet)	Shortlist	
2012	China Miéville	Toiset (The City and the City)	Shortlist	
2012	Hal Duncan	Pako helvetistä! (Escape from Hell!)	Shortlist	
2012	John Ajvide Lindqvist	Kultatukka, tähtönen (Lilla Stjärna; Little Star)	Shortlist	
2013	Steph Swainston	Uusi maailma (The Modern World)	Winner	
2013	Anders Fager	Pohjoiset kultit (Svenska kulter: Skräckberättelser)	Shortlist	
2013	Gene Wolfe	Kiduttajan varjo (The Shadow of the Torturer)	Shortlist	
2013	Liz Williams	Aavekauppiaan tytär (Snake Agent)	Shortlist	
2013	Terry Pratchett	Posti kulkee (Going Postal)	Shortlist	
2014	Bruno Schulz	Kanelipuodit ja muita kertomuksia (The Street of Crocodiles)	Winner	
2014	Aloysius Bertrand	Yön Kaspar (Gaspard de la Nuit)	Shortlist	
2014	C. S. Lewis	Kasvoista kasvoihin (Till We Have Faces: A Myth Retold)	Shortlist	
2014	Catherynne M. Valente	Tyttö joka purjehti Satumaan ympäri itse rakentamallaan laivalla (The Girl Who Circumnavigated Fairyland in a Ship of Her Own Making)	Shortlist	
2014	Eowyn Ivey	Lumilapsi (The Snow Child)	Shortlist	
2015	Terry Pratchett	FC Akateemiset (Unseen Academicals)	Winner	
2015	Kate Atkinson	Elämä elämältä (Life After Life)	Shortlist	
2015	Liz Williams	Kultainen lohikäärme (Precious Dragon)	Shortlist	
2015	Machado de Assis	Kuolematon ja muita novelleja	Shortlist	
2015	Robert W. Chambers	Keltainen kuningas (The King in Yellow)	Shortlist	
2016	Shaun Tan	Etäisten esikaupunkien asioita (Tales from Outer Suburbia)	Winner	
2017	Kazuo Ishiguro	Haudattu jättiläinen (The Buried Giant)	Winner	
2017	Joe Abercrombie	Halki puolen maailman (Half the World)	Shortlist	
2017	Lauren Beukes	Eläinten valtakunta (Zoo City)	Shortlist	
2017	Francis Marion Crawford	Ajattomat aaveet (Timeless Ghosts)	Shortlist	
2017	Patrick Ness and Siobhan Dowd	Hirviön kutsu (A Monster Calls)	Shortlist	
2018	David Mitchell	Luukellot (The Bone Clocks)	Winner	
2018	Eka Kurniawan	Kauneus on kirous (Beauty Is A Wound)	Shortlist	
2018	Ursula K. Le Guin	Ikuisen hämärän maa (The Beginning Place)	Shortlist	
2018	Andri Snær Magnason	Aika-arkku (Tímakistan)	Shortlist	
2018	Brandon Sanderson	Viimeinen valtakunta (Mistborn: The Final Empire)	Shortlist	
2019	Matt Haig	Kuinka aika pysäytetään (How to Stop Time)	Shortlist	
2019	Robin Hobb	Narrin salamurhaaja (Fool’s Assassin)	Shortlist	
2019	Shirley Jackson	Linna on aina ollut kotimme (We Have Always Lived in the Castle)	Shortlist	
2019	Samanta Schweblin	Houreuni ( Fever Dream)	Shortlist	
2019	T. H. White	Muinainen ja tuleva kuningas (The Once and Future King)	Shortlist	
2020	Juhani Karila	Pienen hauen pyydystys	Winner	
2020	Katri Alatalo	Ikuisesti, siskoni	Shortlist	
2020	Neil Gaiman	Pohjoisen mytologia (Norse Mythology)	Shortlist	
2020	Karoliina Heinola	Hitonhauta ja muita puolielävien kohtaloita	Shortlist	
2020	V. E. Schwab	Magian syvempi sävy (A Darker Shade of Magic)	Shortlist	
2021	Margaret Rogerson	Kirjojen tytär (Sorcery of Thorns)	Winner	
2021	Dino Buzzati	Noiduttu takki ja muita kertomuksia	Shortlist	
2021	Ta-Nehisi Coates	Vesitanssija (The Water Dancer)	Shortlist	
2021	Heikki Kännö	Runoilija	Shortlist	
2021	M. G. Soikkeli	Neljän miekan tanssi	Shortlist	
2022	Susanna Clarke	Piranesi	Winner	
2022	N. K. Jemisin	Viides vuodenaika (The Fifth Season)	Shortlist	
2022	TJ Klune	Talo taivaansinisellä merellä (The House in the Cerulean Sea)	Shortlist	
2022	Madeline Miller	Kirke ( Circe)	Shortlist	
2022	Siri Pettersen	Rautasusi ( Iron Wolf)	Shortlist	
2023	Jyrki Vainonen	Täytetyt	Winner	
2023	Mariana Enriquez	Yö kuuluu meille (Nuestra parte de noche; Our Share of the Night)	Shortlist	
2023	Marko Hautala	Kuolleiden valssi	Shortlist	
2023	Keigo Higashino	Namiyan puodin ihmeet (Namiya Zakkaten no Kiseki; The Miracles of the Namiya General Store)	Shortlist	
2023	Merja Kyllönen	Vainajaiset	Shortlist	
2024	Jorge Luis Borges	Kertomukset	Shortlist	
2024	R. F. Kuang	Babel	Shortlist	
2024	Vehka Kurjenmiekka	Kellopelisydän	Shortlist	
2024	J. S. Meresmaa	Tytär hämärän, piika pimeän	Shortlist	
2024	Gene Wolfe	Soturi sumussa (Soldier of the Mist)	Shortlist	

== See also ==
- Tähtivaeltaja Award
