= Fantasy Masterworks =

British paperbacks by Millennium

Fantasy Masterworks is a series of British paperbacks by Millennium (an imprint of Victor Gollancz). It is intended to comprise "some of the greatest, most original, and most influential fantasy ever written" and to contain "the books which, along with Tolkien, Peake and others, shaped modern fantasy." as claimed by its publisher.

It has a companion series in the SF Masterworks line. A separate Future Classics line has also started featuring eight science fiction novels from the last few decades.

The books were originally numbered 1 to 50; in the 2013 reboot of the series, the books are unnumbered, have a uniform look, and feature introductions by well-known writers and critics.

== Numbered series (2000–2007) ==
#	Title	Author	Originally published	ISBN	Reprinted
1	Shadow and Claw (The Book of the New Sun, Volume 1)	Gene Wolfe	1983	1-85798-977-5	2000
2	Time and the Gods	Lord Dunsany	1905–1916	1-85798-989-9	2000
3	The Worm Ouroboros	E. R. Eddison	1922	1-85798-993-7	2000
4	Tales of the Dying Earth	Jack Vance	1950–1984	1-85798-994-5	2000
5	Little, Big	John Crowley	1981	1-85798-711-X	2000
6	The Chronicles of Amber	Roger Zelazny	1970–1978	1-85798-726-8	2000
7	Viriconium	M. John Harrison	1971–1985	1-85798-995-3	2000
8	The People of the Black Circle (The Conan Chronicles, Volume 1)	Robert E. Howard	1933-2000	1-85798-996-1	2000
9	The Land of Laughs	Jonathan Carroll	1980	1-85798-999-6	2000
10	The Complete Compleat Enchanter	L. Sprague de Camp and Fletcher Pratt	1940–1954	1-85798-757-8	2000
11	Lud-in-the-Mist	Hope Mirrlees	1926	1-85798-767-5	2000
12	Sword and Citadel (The Book of the New Sun, Volume 2)	Gene Wolfe	1982 & 1983	1-85798-700-4	2000
13	Fevre Dream	George R. R. Martin	1982	1-85798-331-9	2001
14	Beauty	Sheri S. Tepper	1991	1-85798-722-5	2001
15	The King of Elfland's Daughter	Lord Dunsany	1924	1-85798-790-X	2001
16	The Hour of the Dragon (The Conan Chronicles, Volume 2)	Robert E. Howard	1932-2001	1-85798-747-0	2001
17	Elric	Michael Moorcock	1961–1965	1-85798-743-8	2001
18	The First Book of Lankhmar	Fritz Leiber	1968–1970	1-85798-327-0	2001
19	The Riddle-Master's Game	Patricia A. McKillip	1976–1979	1-85798-796-9	2001
20	Time and Again	Jack Finney	1970	0-575-07360-8	2001
21	Mistress of Mistresses	E.R. Eddison	1935	0-575-07284-9	2001
22	Gloriana	Michael Moorcock	1978	0-575-07359-4	2001
23	The Well of the Unicorn	Fletcher Pratt	1948	0-575-07267-9	2001
24	The Second Book of Lankhmar	Fritz Leiber	1968–1988	0-575-07358-6	2001
25	Voice of Our Shadow	Jonathan Carroll	1983	0-575-07367-5	2002
26	The Emperor of Dreams	Clark Ashton Smith	1928-2002	0-575-07373-X	2002
27	Suldrun's Garden (Lyonesse, Volume 1)	Jack Vance	1983	0-575-07374-8	2002
28	Peace	Gene Wolfe	1975	0-575-07376-4	2002
29	The Dragon Waiting	John M. Ford	1983	0-575-07378-0	2002
30	Chronicles of Corum	Michael Moorcock	1977	0-575-07366-7	2002
31	Black Gods and Scarlet Dream	C. L. Moore	1933–1939	0-575-07417-5	2002
32	The Broken Sword	Poul Anderson	1954	0-575-07425-6	2002
33	The House on the Borderland and Other Novels	William Hope Hodgson	1907-1946	0-575-07372-1	2002
34	The Drawing of the Dark	Tim Powers	1979	0-575-07426-4	2002
35	The Green Pearl and Madouc (Lyonesse, Volume 2)	Jack Vance	1985 & 1989	0-575-07517-1	2003
36	The History of the Runestaff	Michael Moorcock	1979	0-575-07469-8	2003
37	A Voyage to Arcturus	David Lindsay	1920	0-575-07483-3	2003
38	Darker Than You Think	Jack Williamson	1948	0-575-07546-5	2003
39	The Mabinogion	Evangeline Walton	1936-2002	0-575-07538-4	2003
40	Three Hearts & Three Lions	Poul Anderson	1961	0-575-07498-1	2003
41	Grendel	John Gardner	1971	0-575-07582-1	2004
42	The Iron Dragon's Daughter	Michael Swanwick	1993	0-575-07605-4	2004
43	Was	Geoff Ryman	1992	0-575-07669-0	2005
44	Song of Kali	Dan Simmons	1985	0-575-07659-3	2005
45	Replay	Ken Grimwood	1986	0-575-07559-7	2005
46	Sea-Kings of Mars and Otherworldly Stories	Leigh Brackett	1942-2005	0-575-07689-5	2005
47	The Anubis Gates	Tim Powers	1983	0-575-07725-5	2005
48	The Forgotten Beasts of Eld	Patricia A. McKillip	1974	0-575-07765-4	2005
49	Something Wicked This Way Comes	Ray Bradbury	1962	0-575-07874-X	2006
50	The Mark of the Beast and Other Fantastical Tales	Rudyard Kipling	1884-2007	0-575-07791-3	2007

== Relaunch series (2013–2016) ==
^ Also published in the Fantasy Masterworks numbered series.

Title	Author	Originally published	ISBN	Reprinted
Aegypt	John Crowley	1987	978-0-575-08300-4	2013
The Dragon Griaule	Lucius Shepard	2013	978-0-575-08992-1	2013
Last Call	Tim Powers	1992	978-0-575-11681-8	2013
The Falling Woman	Pat Murphy	1986	978-0-575-13314-3	2013
The Phoenix and the Mirror	Avram Davidson	1969	978-0-575-13038-8	2013
Lord Darcy	Randall Garrett	1964–1979	978-1-4732-0104-0	2014
Votan and Other Novels	John James	1966–1969	978-0-575-10550-8	2014
The Broken Sword ^	Poul Anderson	1954	978-1-4732-0544-4	2014
Ombria in Shadow	Patricia A. McKillip	2002	978-1-4732-0574-1	2014
Beauty ^	Sheri S. Tepper	1991	978-1-4732-0659-5	2014
Mythago Wood	Robert Holdstock	1984	978-1-4732-0545-1	2014
Little, Big ^	John Crowley	1981	978-1-4732-0547-5	2015
Shadow and Claw (The Book of the New Sun, Volume 1)	Gene Wolfe	1983	978-1-4732-1197-1	2015
Expiration Date	Tim Powers	1996	978-1-4732-1198-8	2015
The Forgotten Beasts of Eld ^	Patricia A. McKillip	1974	978-1-4732-1203-9	2015
Lavondyss	Robert Holdstock	1988	978-1-4732-1199-5	2015
Earthquake Weather	Tim Powers	1997	978-1-4732-1205-3	2015
Thomas the Rhymer	Ellen Kushner	1990	978-1-4732-1162-9	2015
The Anvil of Ice	Michael Scott Rohan	1986	978-0-575-09221-1	2015
Elleander Morning	Jerry Yulsman	1984	978-1-4732-1169-8	2015
The Circus of Dr. Lao	Charles G. Finney	1935	978-1-4732-1367-8	2016

== See also ==
- SF Masterworks
