= Mythopoeic Awards =

Literary award

- Official logo of the Mythopoeic Fantasy Award
- Awarded for: Outstanding works in the fields of myth, fantasy, and the scholarly study of these areas
- Presented by: Mythopoeic Society
- First award: 1971
- Most recent winners: T. Kingfisher (Adult Literature); K. Ancrum (Young Adult Literature); Aubrey Hartman (Children's Literature); Michael D.C. Drout (Inklings Studies); Adam Roberts (Myth and Fantasy Studies)
- Website: mythsoc.org/awards.htm

The Mythopoeic Awards for literature and literary studies are given annually for outstanding works in the fields of myth, fantasy, and the scholarly study of these areas. Established by the Mythopoeic Society in 1971, the Mythopoeic Fantasy Award is given for "fiction in the spirit of the Inklings", and the Scholarship Award for non-fiction work. The award is a statuette of a seated lion, with a plaque on the base. It has drawn resemblance to, and is often called, the "Aslan".

The Mythopoeic Award is one of the "principal annual awards" for fantasy according to critic Brian Stableford. From 1971 to 1991, there was one award per category, annual but not always awarded before 1981. Dual awards in each category were established in 1992: Mythopoeic Fantasy Awards for Adult Literature and Children's Literature; Scholarship Awards in Inklings Studies, and Myth and Fantasy Studies. In 2010, a Student Paper Award was introduced for the best paper presented at Mythcon by an undergraduate or graduate student; it was renamed the Alexei Kondratiev Award several months after its creation. In 2024, Mythopoeic Fantasy Award for Young Adult Literature was established.

The 2023 winners were announced virtually at the Mythopoeic Society's Online Midsummer Seminar 2023.

== Mythopoeic Fantasy Awards ==
Statuette used as award trophy.

In the following tables, the years correspond to the date of the ceremony, rather than when the novel was first published. Each year links to the corresponding "year in literature". Entries with a yellow background and an asterisk (*) next to the writer's name have won the award; those with a pale grey background are the other nominees on the shortlist.

* Winners

=== Fantasy (1971–1991) ===
==== 1970s ====
Year	Author	Novel	Publisher or publication
1971	Mary Stewart*	The Crystal Cave	Hodder & Stoughton, William Morrow
1971	Lloyd Alexander	The Marvelous Misadventures of Sebastian	E. P. Dutton
1971	Katherine Kurtz	Deryni Rising	Ballantine Books
1971	Roger Zelazny	Nine Princes in Amber	Doubleday
1972	Joy Chant*	Red Moon and Black Mountain	George Allen & Unwin
1972	John Gardner	Grendel	Alfred A. Knopf, Gollancz
1972	Isidore Haiblum	The Tsaddik of the Seven Wonders	Ballantine Books
1972	Ursula K. Le Guin	The Tombs of Atuan	Atheneum Books
1972	Michael Moorcock	The Corum Trilogy	Berkley Books
1972	Joan North	The Light Maze	Farrar, Straus & Giroux
1972	Thomas Burnett Swann	The Forest of Forever	Ace Books
1972	Evangeline Walton	The Children of Llyr	Ballantine Books
1973	Evangeline Walton*	The Song of Rhiannon	Ballantine Books
1973	Poul Anderson	Dancer from Atlantis	Nelson Doubleday
1973	Katherine Kurtz	Deryni Checkmate	Ballantine Books
1973	Ursula K. Le Guin	The Farthest Shore	Atheneum Books
1973	Thomas Burnett Swann	Green Phoenix	DAW Books
1973	Roger Zelazny	The Guns of Avalon	Doubleday
1974	Mary Stewart*	The Hollow Hills	Hodder & Stoughton
1974	Poul Anderson	Hrolf Kraki's Saga	Ballantine Books
1974	Susan Cooper	The Dark Is Rising	Macmillan
1974	Sanders Anne Laubenthal	Excalibur	Ballantine Books
1974	Katherine Kurtz	High Deryni	Ballantine Books
1975	Poul Anderson*	A Midsummer Tempest	Doubleday
1975	Richard Adams	Watership Down	Rex Collings
1975	Patricia A. McKillip	The Forgotten Beasts of Eld	Atheneum Books
1975	H. Warner Munn	Merlin's Ring	Ballantine Books
1975	Thomas Burnett Swann	How Are the Mighty Fallen	DAW Books
1975	Evangeline Walton	Prince of Annwn	Ballantine Books

==== 1980s ====
Year	Author	Novel	Publisher or publication
1981	J. R. R. Tolkien*	Unfinished Tales	George Allen & Unwin
1981	Joy Chant	The Grey Mane of Morning	George Allen & Unwin
1981	Stephen R. Donaldson	The Wounded Land	Del Rey
1981	Ursula K. Le Guin	The Beginning Place	Harper and Row
1981	Morgan Llywelyn	Lion of Ireland	Houghton Mifflin
1982	John Crowley*	Little, Big	Bantam Books
1982	Tanith Lee	Delusion's Master	DAW Books
1982	Elizabeth A. Lynn	The Woman Who Loved the Moon	Berkley Books
1982	Julian May	The Many-Colored Land	Houghton Mifflin
1982	Nancy Springer	The Sable Moon	Pocket Books
1982	Gene Wolfe	The Claw of the Conciliator	Timescape Books
1983	Carol Kendall*	The Firelings	Bodley Head Children's Books
1983	Marion Zimmer Bradley	The Mists of Avalon	Alfred A. Knopf
1983	Stephen R. Donaldson	The One Tree	Del Rey
1983	David Eddings	Queen of Sorcery	Del Rey
1983	P. C. Hodgell	God Stalk	Atheneum Books
1983	Robin McKinley	The Blue Sword	Greenwillow Books
1983	Robin McKinley	The Door in the Hedge	Greenwillow Books
1983	Diana L. Paxson	Lady of Light	Pocket Books
1983	Meredith Ann Pierce	The Darkangel	Little Brown & Co
1984	Joy Chant*	When Voiha Wakes	Golden Apple
1984	Other nominees not available		
1985	Jane Yolen*	Cards of Grief	Ace Books
1985	Charles de Lint	Moonheart	Ace Books
1985	R. A. MacAvoy	The Damiano Trilogy	Bantam Books
1985	Robin McKinley	The Hero and the Crown	Greenwillow Books
1985	J. R. R. Tolkien	The Book of Lost Tales	George Allen & Unwin
1986	Barry Hughart*	Bridge of Birds	St. Martin's Press
1986	Barbara Hambly	Dragonsbane	Del Rey
1986	P. C. Hodgell	Dark of the Moon	Atheneum Books
1986	Diana Wynne Jones	Fire and Hemlock	Greenwillow Books
1986	Ursula K. Le Guin	Always Coming Home	Harper and Row
1986	Manuel Mujica Lainez	The Wandering Unicorn	Berkley Books
1987	Peter S. Beagle*	The Folk of the Air	Del Rey
1987	Guy Gavriel Kay	The Fionavar Tapestry	Berkley Books
1987	Tanith Lee	Tales from the Flat Earth	DAW Books
1987	Jane Yolen	Merlin's Booke	Ace Books
1988	Orson Scott Card*	Seventh Son	Tor Books
1988	Emma Bull	War for the Oaks	Ace Books
1988	Pat Murphy	The Falling Woman	Tor Books
1988	Connie Willis	Lincoln's Dreams	Bantam Books
1989	Michael Bishop*	Unicorn Mountain	Arbor House / William Morrow
1989	James P. Blaylock	The Last Coin	Ace Books
1989	Orson Scott Card	Red Prophet	Tor Books
1989	Kara Dalkey	The Nightingale	Ace Books
1989	Diana L. Paxson	The White Raven	William Morrow & Co
1989	Michaela Roessner	Walkabout Woman	Bantam Books

==== 1990s ====
Year	Author	Novel	Publisher or publication
1990	Tim Powers*	The Stress of Her Regard	Ace Books
1990	Orson Scott Card	Prentice Alvin	Tor Books
1990	Patricia A. McKillip	The Changeling Sea	Atheneum Books
1990	Pat Murphy	The City, Not Long After	Doubleday
1990	Matt Ruff	Fool on the Hill	The Atlantic Monthly Press
1991	Ellen Kushner*	Thomas the Rhymer	William Morrow & Co
1991	Guy Gavriel Kay	Tigana	Penguin Canada
1991	Ursula K. Le Guin	Tehanu	Atheneum Books
1991	James Morrow	Only Begotten Daughter	William Morrow & Co
1991	Jane Yolen	The Books of Great Alta	Tor Books

=== Adult Literature ===
==== 1990s ====
Mythopoeic Award for Adult Literature honorees
Year	Author	Novel	Publisher or publication
1992	Eleanor Arnason*	A Woman of the Iron People	William Morrow & Co
1992	Pamela Dean	Tam Lin	Tor Books
1992	Greer Ilene Gilman	Moonwise	Roc
1992	Patricia A. McKillip	The Sorceress and the Cygnet	Ace Books
1992	Sheri S. Tepper	Beauty	Doubleday
1993	Jane Yolen*	Briar Rose	Tor Books
1993	James P. Blaylock	The Paper Grail	Ace Books
1993	Tim Powers	Last Call	William Morrow & Co
1993	Susan Shwartz	The Grail of Hearts	Tor Books
1993	Connie Willis	Doomsday Book	Bantam Spectra
1994	Delia Sherman*	The Porcelain Dove	Dutton Adult
1994	Peter S. Beagle	The Innkeeper's Song	Ace Books
1994	Patricia A. McKillip	The Cygnet and the Firebird	Ace Books
1994	Robin McKinley	Deerskin	Ace Books
1995	Patricia A. McKillip*	Something Rich and Strange	Bantam Spectra
1995	Pamela Dean	The Dubious Hills	Tor Books
1995	Robert Holdstock	The Hollowing	HarperCollins
1995	Rachel Pollack	Temporary Agency	St. Martin's Press
1996	Elizabeth Hand*	Waking the Moon	HarperCollins
1996	Michael Bishop	Brittle Innings	Bantam Books
1996	James P. Blaylock	All the Bells on Earth	Ace Books
1996	Patricia A. McKillip	The Book of Atrix Wolfe	Ace Books
1996	Kenneth Morris	The Dragon Path	Tom Doherty Assoc.
1997 (Adult and Children's awards combined)	Terri Windling*	The Wood Wife	Tor Books
1997 (Adult and Children's awards combined)	John Barnes	One for the Morning Glory	Tor Books
1997 (Adult and Children's awards combined)	Patricia A. McKillip	Winter Rose	Ace Books
1997 (Adult and Children's awards combined)	Nancy Springer	Fair Peril	Avon Books
1997 (Adult and Children's awards combined)	Gene Wolfe	The Book of the Long Sun	Tor Books
1998	A. S. Byatt*	The Djinn in the Nightingale's Eye	Chatto & Windus
1998	Peter S. Beagle	Giant Bones	Roc
1998	Charles de Lint	Trader	Tor Books
1998	Neil Gaiman	Neverwhere	BBC Books
1998	Patrick O'Leary	The Gift	Tor Books
1999	Neil Gaiman and Charles Vess*	Stardust	DC Comics
1999	Charles de Lint	Someplace to be Flying	Tor Books
1999	R. E. Klein	The History of our World Beyond the Wave	Houghton Mifflin Harcourt
1999	Patricia A. McKillip	Song for the Basilisk	Ace Books
1999	James Stoddard	The High House	Warner Books

==== 2000s ====
Year	Author	Novel	Publisher or publication
2000	Peter S. Beagle*	Tamsin	Roc
2000	A. S. Byatt	Elementals	Chatto & Windus
2000	Lisa Goldstein	Dark Cities Underground	Tor Books
2000	Peg Kerr	The Wild Swans	Aspect
2000	Yves Meynard	The Book of Knights	Tor Books
2001	Midori Snyder*	The Innamorati	Tor Books
2001	Win Blevins	RavenShadow	Forge
2001	Charles de Lint	Forests of the Heart	Tor Books
2001	Guy Gavriel Kay	The Sarantine Mosaic	Penguin Books Canada
2002	Lois McMaster Bujold*	The Curse of Chalion	Eos
2002	Neil Gaiman	American Gods	William Morrow
2002	Sarah A. Hoyt	Ill Met by Moonlight	Ace Books
2002	Ursula K. Le Guin	The Other Wind	Harcourt Brace & Company
2002	Tim Powers	Declare	HarperCollins
2003	Patricia A. McKillip*	Ombria in Shadow	Ace Books
2003	Nina Kiriki Hoffman	A Fistful of Sky	Ace Books
2003	Ellen Kushner and Delia Sherman	The Fall of the Kings	Bantam Books
2004	Robin McKinley*	Sunshine	Berkley Publishing Group
2004	Lois McMaster Bujold	Paladin of Souls	Eos
2004	Kij Johnson	Fudoki	Tor Books
2004	Ursula K. Le Guin	Changing Planes	Harcourt Inc.
2004	Patricia A. McKillip	In the Forests of Serre	Ace Books
2005	Susanna Clarke*	Jonathan Strange & Mr Norrell	Bloomsbury
2005	Kage Baker	The Anvil of the World	Tor Books
2005	Elizabeth Hand	Mortal Love	William Morrow
2005	Patricia A. McKillip	Alphabet of Thorn	Ace Books
2005	Gene Wolfe	The Wizard Knight	Tor Books
2006	Neil Gaiman*	Anansi Boys	William Morrow
2006	Margaret Atwood	The Penelopiad	Knopf Canada
2006	Lois McMaster Bujold	The Hallowed Hunt	Eos
2006	Tanith Lee	Metallic Love	Bantam Spectra
2006	Tim Pratt	The Strange Adventures of Rangergirl	Bantam Spectra
2007	Patricia A. McKillip*	Solstice Wood	Ace Books
2007	Peter S. Beagle	The Line Between	Tachyon Publications
2007	Susanna Clarke	The Ladies of Grace Adieu	Bloomsbury
2007	Keith Donohue	The Stolen Child	Nan A. Talese
2007	Susan Palwick	The Necessary Beggar	Tor Books
2007	Tim Powers	Three Days to Never	William Morrow
2008	Catherynne M. Valente*	The Orphan's Tales	Bantam Spectra
2008	Theodora Goss	In the Forest of Forgetting	Prime Books
2008	Nalo Hopkinson	The New Moon's Arms	Grand Central Publishing
2008	Guy Gavriel Kay	Ysabel	Roc
2008	John C. Wright	Chronicles of Chaos	Tor Books
2009	Carol Berg*	Flesh and Spirit and Breath and Bone	Roc
2009	Daryl Gregory	Pandemonium	Del Rey
2009	Ursula K. Le Guin	Lavinia	Harcourt
2009	Patricia A. McKillip	The Bell at Sealey Head	Ace Books
2009	Gene Wolfe	An Evil Guest	Tor Books

==== 2010s ====
Year	Author	Novel	Publisher or publication
2010	Jo Walton*	Lifelode	NESFA Press
2010	Barbara Campbell	Trickster's Game trilogy	DAW Books
2010	Greer Gilman	Cloud & Ashes: Three Winter's Tales	Small Beer Press
2010	Robert Holdstock	Avilion	Gollancz
2010	Catherynne M. Valente	Palimpsest	Bantam Spectra
2011	Karen Lord*	Redemption in Indigo	Small Beer Press
2011	Guy Gavriel Kay	Under Heaven	Roc
2011	Patricia A. McKillip	The Bards of Bone Plain	Ace Books
2011	Devon Monk	A Cup of Normal	Fairwood Press
2011	Sharon Shinn	Troubled Waters	Ace Books
2012	Lisa Goldstein*	The Uncertain Places	Tachyon Publications
2012	Erin Morgenstern	The Night Circus	Doubleday
2012	Richard Parks	The Heavenly Fox	PS Publishing
2012	Catherynne M. Valente	Deathless	Tor Books
2012	Jo Walton	Among Others	Tor Books
2013	Ursula Vernon*	Digger	Sofawolf Press
2013	Alan Garner	Weirdstone trilogy	Collins, Fourth Estate
2013	Caitlin R. Kiernan	The Drowning Girl	Roc
2013	R. A. MacAvoy	Death and Resurrection	Prime Books
2013	Tim Powers	Hide Me Among the Graves	William Morrow
2014	Helene Wecker*	The Golem and the Jinni	Harper
2014	Yangsze Choo	The Ghost Bride	William Morrow
2014	Neil Gaiman	The Ocean at the End of the Lane	William Morrow
2014	Max Gladstone	Three Parts Dead	Tor Books
2014	Mark H. Williams	Sleepless Knights	Atomic Fez Publishing
2015	Sarah Avery*	Tales from Rugosa Coven	Dark Quest
2015	Stephanie Feldman	The Angel of Losses	Ecco
2015	Theodora Goss	Songs for Ophelia	Papaveria Press
2015	Joanne M. Harris	The Gospel of Loki	Gollancz
2015	Joe Hill and Gabriel Rodriguez	Locke & Key	IDW Publishing
2016	Naomi Novik*	Uprooted	Del Rey
2016	Holly Black	The Darkest Part of the Forest	Little Brown & Co
2016	Kazuo Ishiguro	The Buried Giant	Knopf
2016	E. K. Johnston	A Thousand Nights	Disney-Hyperion
2016	Daniel José Older	Shadowshaper	Arthur A. Levine Books
2017	Patricia A. McKillip*	Kingfisher	Ace Books
2017	Andrea Hairston	Will Do Magic For Small Change	Aqueduct Press
2017	Mary Robinette Kowal	Ghost Talkers	Tor Books
2017	Maggie Stiefvater	The Raven Cycle	Scholastic
2017	Jo Walton	Thessaly trilogy	Tor Books
2018	John Crowley*	Ka: Dar Oakley in the Ruin of Ymr	Saga Press
2018	Alice Hoffman	The Rules of Magic	Simon & Schuster
2018	G. A. Kathryns	Snow City	Sycamore Sky Books
2018	Ellen Klages	Passing Strange	Tor.com
2018	Victor LaValle	The Changeling	Spiegel & Grau
2019	Naomi Novik*	Spinning Silver	Del Rey
2019	Mishell Baker	Borderline; Phantom Pains; Impostor Syndrome	Saga
2019	Madeline Miller	Circe	Little, Brown
2019	Sarah Rees Brennan	In Other Lands	Big Mouth House
2019	Ruthanna Emrys	The Litany of Earth; Winter Tide; Deep Roots	Tor.com

==== 2020s ====
Year	Author	Novel	Publisher or publication
2020	Theodora Goss*	Snow White Learns Witchcraft	Mythic Delirium Books
2020	P. Djèlí Clark	The Haunting of Tram Car 015	Tor.com
2020	Alix E. Harrow	The Ten Thousand Doors of January	Redhook
2020	Jo Walton	Lent	Tor Books
2020	G. Willow Wilson	The Bird King	Grove Press
2021	TJ Klune*	The House in the Cerulean Sea	Tor
2021	Alice Hoffman	Magic Lessons	Simon Schuster
2021	Jordan Ifueko	Raybearer	Amulet
2021	Silvia Moreno-Garcia	Mexican Gothic	Del Rey
2021	Garth Nix	The Left-Handed Booksellers of London	Katherine Tegen Books
2022	Jo Walton*	Or What You Will	Tor
2022	Katherine Addison	The Witness for the Dead	Tor
2022	Ryka Aoki	Light From Uncommon Stars	Tor
2022	P. Djèlí Clark	A Master of Djinn	Tordotcom
2022	Susanna Clarke	Piranesi	Bloomsbury
2022	Garth Nix	Terciel and Elinor	Katherine Tegen Books
2023	Sacha Lamb*	When the Angels Left the Old Country	Levine Querido
2023	Kelly Barnhill	When Women Were Dragons	Doubleday
2023	Alex Jennings	The Ballad of Perilous Graves	Redhook
2023	GennaRose Nethercott	Thistlefoot	Anchor Books
2023	Peng Shepherd	The Cartographers	William Morrow
2024	Emma Törzs*	Ink, Blood, Sister, Scribe	William Morrow
2024	Travis Baldree	Bookshops & Bonedust	Tor
2024	Becky Chambers	Monk & Robot series	Tordotcom
2024	Heather Fawcett	Emily Wilde’s Encyclopaedia of Faeries	Del Rey
2024	Trip Galey	A Market of Dreams and Destiny	Titan
2024	David R. Slayton	Adam Binder series	Blackstone Publishing
2025	Minsoo Kang*	The Melancholy of Untold History	William Morrow
2025	Katherine Arden	The Warm Hands of Ghosts	Del Rey
2025	Yangsze Choo	The Fox Wife	Henry Holt & Co
2025	Deborah K. Vleck	The Society of Guenevere	FTL Publications
2025	Nghi Vo	The City in Glass	Tordotcom
2026	T. Kingfisher*	Snake-Eater	47North
2026	Katherine Arden	The Warm Hands of Ghosts	Del Rey
2026	Holly Black	The Charlatan Duology	Tor Books
2026	Martin Cahill	Audition for the Fox	Tachyon
2026	Lev Grossman	The Bright Sword	Viking Books
2026	Jared Pechaček	The West Passage	Tordotcom
2026	Samantha Sotto Yambao	Water Moon	Del Ray Books
2026	Emily Tesh	The Incandescent	Tor Books

=== Young Adult Literature (2024–present) ===
Year	Author	Novel	Publisher or publication
2024	Frances Hardinge*	Unraveller	Amulet Books
2024	Kiyash Monsef	Once There Was	Simon & Schuster Books for Young Readers
2024	L.C. Rosen	Lion’s Legacy	Union Square & Co.
2024	Tyler Tork	The Goodnight Agency	Mad Cat, Roan & Wetherford
2024	Sarah Underwood	Lies We Sing to the Sea	HarperTeen
2025	Amie Kaufman*	The Isles of the Gods duology	Knopf Books for Young Readers
2025	Anna Bright	The Hedge Witch of Foxhall	HarperCollins
2025	Darcie Little Badger	Sheine Lende	Levine Querido
2025	Kelly Murashige	The Lost Souls of Benzaiten	Soho Teen
2025	A.B. Poranek	Where the Dark Stands Still	McElderry Books
2026	K. Ancrum*	The Corruption of Hollis Brow	HarperCollins
2026	Amber McBride	The Leaving Room	Feiwel & Friends
2026	Margaret Owen	Little Thieves series	Henry Holt & Co
2026	Vanessa L. Torres	On the Wings of La Noche	Knopf

=== Children's Literature ===
==== 1990s ====
Year	Author	Novel	Publisher or publication
1992	Salman Rushdie*	Haroun and the Sea of Stories	Granta
1992	Bruce Coville	Jeremy Thatcher, Dragon Hatcher	Harcourt Brace Jovanovich
1992	Diana Wynne Jones	Castle in the Air	Methuen
1992	Will Shetterly	Elsewhere	Harcourt Brace Jovanovich
1992	Zilpha Keatley Snyder	Song of the Gargoyle	Delacorte Press
1993	James D. Macdonald*	Knight's Wyrd	HMH Books for Young Readers
1993	T. A. Barron	The Ancient One	Philomel Books
1993	Bruce Coville	Jennifer Murdley's Toad	Jane Yolen Books
1993	Peni R. Griffin	Hobkin	Margaret K. McElderry
1993	Ursula K. Le Guin	Fish Soup	Atheneum
1994	Suzy McKee Charnas*	The Kingdom of Kevin Malone	Harcourt Brace Jovanovich
1994	Lynne Reid Banks	The Mystery of the Cupboard	HarperCollins Children's Books
1994	Lois Lowry	The Giver	Houghton Mifflin Harcourt
1994	Will Shetterly	Nevernever	HMH Books for Young Readers
1994	Patricia C. Wrede	Calling on Dragons	Harcourt Brace Jovanovich
1995	Patrice Kindl*	Owl in Love	HMH Books for Young Readers
1995	Emma Bull	The Princess and the Lord of Night	Harcourt Children's Books
1995	Peni R. Griffin	Switching Well	Margaret K. McElderry
1995	Robin McKinley	A Knot in the Grain and Other Stories	Greenwillow Books
1995	Jane Yolen	Good Griselle	Harcourt Children's Books
1996	Diana Wynne Jones*	The Crown of Dalemark	Mandarin
1996	Susan Cooper	The Boggart	Macmillan
1996	Luli Gray	Falcon's Egg	Houghton Mifflin Harcourt
1996	Sherwood Smith	Wren's War	Jane Yolen Books
1996	Sylvia Waugh	The Mennyms	Julia McRae
1997 (Adult and Children's awards combined)	Terri Windling*	The Wood Wife	Tor Books
1997 (Adult and Children's awards combined)	John Barnes	One for the Morning Glory	Tor Books
1997 (Adult and Children's awards combined)	Patricia A. McKillip	Winter Rose	Ace Books
1997 (Adult and Children's awards combined)	Nancy Springer	Fair Peril	Avon Books
1997 (Adult and Children's awards combined)	Gene Wolfe	The Book of the Long Sun	Tor Books
1998	Jane Yolen*	Young Merlin trilogy	Harcourt Children's Books
1998	Susan Cooper	The Boggart and the Monster	Margaret K. McElderry
1998	Dahlov Ipcar	A Dark Horn Blowing	Viking Press
1998	Robin McKinley	Rose Daughter	Greenwillow Books
1999	Diana Wynne Jones*	Dark Lord of Derkholm	Gollancz
1999	Kara Dalkey	Heavenward Path	Harcourt Children's Books
1999	Gail Carson Levine	Ella Enchanted	HarperTrophy
1999	Gerald Morris	The Squire's Tale	HMH Books for Young Readers
1999	J. K. Rowling	Harry Potter and the Philosopher's Stone	Bloomsbury

==== 2000s ====
Year	Author	Novel	Publisher or publication
2000	Franny Billingsley*	The Folk Keeper	Atheneum
2000	David Almond	Skellig	Hodder Children's Books
2000	Tamora Pierce	Circle of Magic	Scholastic
2000	J. K. Rowling	Harry Potter and the Prisoner of Azkaban	Bloomsbury
2000	Cynthia Voigt	Kingdom	Atheneum / Anne Schwartz Books
2001	Dia Calhoun*	Aria of the Sea	Winslow Press
2001	Rita Murphy	Night Flying	Delacorte Books for Young Readers
2001	Donna Jo Napoli	Beast	Atheneum
2001	Laurel Winter	Growing Wings	Houghton Mifflin Harcourt
2001	Jane Yolen	Boots and the Seven Leaguers	Harcourt Children's Books
2002	Peter Dickinson*	The Ropemaker	Delacorte Press
2002	Diane Duane	The Wizard's Dilemma	Harcourt Trade Publishers
2002	Eva Ibbotson	Island of the Aunts	Dutton
2002	Gail Carson Levine	The Two Princesses of Bamarre	HarperCollins
2003	Michael Chabon*	Summerland	Miramax
2003	Holly Black	Tithe: A Modern Faerie Tale	Simon & Schuster
2003	Nancy Farmer	The House of the Scorpion	Atheneum
2003	Neil Gaiman	Coraline	Bloomsbury
2003	Vivian Vande Velde	Heir Apparent	Harcourt
2004	Clare B. Dunkle*	The Hollow Kingdom	Henry Holt
2004	Kate DiCamillo	The Tale of Despereaux	Candlewick Press
2004	Cornelia Funke	Inkheart	Chicken House
2004	Shannon Hale	The Goose Girl	Bloomsbury
2004	Terry Pratchett	The Wee Free Men	Doubleday
2005	Terry Pratchett*	A Hat Full of Sky	Doubleday
2005	Kevin Crossley-Holland	Arthur Trilogy	Orion Publishing Group
2005	Nancy Farmer	Sea of Trolls	Atheneum
2005	Monica Furlong	Doran Trilogy	Random House Books for Young Readers
2005	Garth Nix	The Abhorsen Trilogy	HarperCollins
2006	Jonathan Stroud*	The Bartimaeus Trilogy	Doubleday
2006	Holly Black	Valiant	Simon & Schuster
2006	Diane Duane	Wizards at War	Harcourt Trade Publishers
2006	Clare B. Dunkle	By These Ten Bones	Henry Holt and Co.
2007	Catherine Fisher*	Corbenic	Greenwillow Books
2007	Nina Kiriki Hoffman	Spirits That Walk in Shadow	Viking Press
2007	Diana Wynne Jones	The Pinhoe Egg	Greenwillow Books
2007	Martine Leavitt	Keturah and Lord Death	Front Street
2007	Terry Pratchett	Wintersmith	Doubleday
2008	J. K. Rowling*	Harry Potter series	Bloomsbury
2008	Holly Black	Tithe: A Modern Faerie Tale; Valiant: A Modern Tale of Faerie; Ironside: A Modern Faery's Tale	Simon & Schuster, Margaret K. McElderry
2008	Derek Landy	Skulduggery Pleasant	HarperCollins
2008	Nancy Springer	Dusssie	Walker Books for Young Readers
2008	Kate Thompson	The New Policeman	HarperTeen
2009	Kristin Cashore*	Graceling	Harcourt Children's Books
2009	Neil Gaiman	The Graveyard Book	HarperCollins
2009	Diana Wynne Jones	House of Many Ways	HarperCollins
2009	Ingrid Law	Savvy	Dial
2009	Terry Pratchett	Nation	Doubleday

==== 2010s ====
Award winner and finalists, 2010–2019
Year	Author	Novel	Publisher or publication
2010	Grace Lin*	Where the Mountain Meets the Moon	Little, Brown
2010	Kage Baker	The Hotel Under the Sand	Tachyon
2010	Shannon Hale	Books of Bayern	Bloomsbury
2010	Malinda Lo	Ash	Little, Brown
2010	Lisa Mantchev	Eyes Like Stars	Feiwel & Friends
2011	Megan Whalen Turner*	The Queen's Thief series	Greenwillow Books
2011	Catherine Fisher	Incarceron and Sapphique	Dial
2011	Terry Pratchett	I Shall Wear Midnight	Doubleday
2011	Polly Shulman	The Grimm Legacy	Putnam Juvenile
2011	Heather Tomlinson	Toads and Diamonds	Henry Holt and Co.
2012	Delia Sherman*	The Freedom Maze	Big Mouth House
2012	Lisa Mantchev	Théâtre Illuminata series	Feiwel & Friends
2012	Tamora Pierce	Beka Cooper series	Random House
2012	Maggie Stiefvater	The Scorpio Races	Scholastic
2012	Catherynne M. Valente	The Girl Who Circumnavigated Fairyland in a Ship of Her Own Making	Feiwel & Friends
2013	Sarah Beth Durst*	Vessel	Margaret K. McElderry
2013	Jorge Aguirre and Rafael Rosado	Giants Beware!	First Second
2013	Merrie Haskell	The Princess Curse	HarperCollins
2013	Christopher Healy	The Hero's Guide to Saving Your Kingdom	Walden Pond Press
2013	Sherwood Smith	The Spy Princess	Viking Juvenile
2014	Holly Black*	Doll Bones	Margaret K. McElderry
2014	William Alexander	Ghoulish Song	Margaret K. McElderry
2014	Joseph Bruchac	Killer of Enemies	Tu Books
2014	Sara Beth Durst	Conjured	Walker Books
2014	Robin McKinley	Shadows	Nancy Paulsen Books
2015	Natalie Lloyd*	A Snicker of Magic	Scholastic
2015	Jonathan Auxier	The Night Gardener	Harry N. Abrams
2015	Merrie Haskell	The Castle Behind Thorns	Katherine Tegan Books
2015	Diana Wynne Jones and Ursula Jones	The Islands of Chaldea	Greenwillow Books
2015	Robin LaFevers	His Fair Assassin series	Houghton Mifflin Harcourt
2016	Ursula Vernon*	Castle Hangnail	Dial
2016	Cassie Beasley	Circus Mirandus	Dial
2016	Robert Beatty	Serafina and The Black Cloak	Disney-Hyperion
2016	Sarah Beth Durst	The Girl Who Could Not Dream	Clarion Books
2016	Terry Pratchett	Tiffany Aching Series	Doubleday
2017	Adam Gidwitz*	The Inquisitor's Tale: Or, The Three Magical Children and their Holy Dog	Dutton
2017	S. E. Grove	The Mapmakers Trilogy	Viking
2017	Bridget Hodder	The Rat Prince	Farrar, Straus, & Giroux
2017	Grace Lin	When the Sea Turned to Silver	Little, Brown
2017	Delia Sherman	The Evil Wizard Smallbone	Candlewick
2018	Garth Nix*	Frogkisser!	Scholastic
2018	Cassie Beasley	Tumble and Blue	Dial
2018	Stephanie Burgis	The Dragon with the Chocolate Heart	Bloomsbury Children's Books
2018	Nidhi Chanani	Pashmina	First Second
2018	A. F. Harrold	The Song from Somewhere Else	Bloomsbury Children's Books
2019	Wendy Mass and Rebecca Stead*	Bob	Feiwel and Friends
2019	Jorge Aguirre & Rafael Rosado	Giants Beware!; Dragons Beware!; Monsters Beware!	First Second
2019	Jonathan Auxier	Sweep: The Story of a Girl and Her Monster	Abrams
2019	Sarah Beth Durst	The Stone Girl's Story	Clarion Books
2019	Emily Tetri	Tiger vs. Nightmare	First Second

==== 2020s ====
Year	Author	Novel	Publisher or publication
2020	Yoon Ha Lee*	Dragon Pearl	Disney/Hyperion
2020	Erin Entrada Kelly	Lalani of the Distant Sea	Greenwillow Books
2020	Hilary McKay	The Time of Green Magic	Macmillan
2020	Suzanne Nelson	A Tale Magnolius	Alfred A. Knopf
2020	Anne Ursu	The Lost Girl	Walden Pond Press
2021	T. Kingfisher*	A Wizard's Guide to Defensive Baking	Argyll
2021	Lev Grossman	The Silver Arrow	Little, Brown
2021	Kat Leyh	Snapdragon	First Second
2021	Tae Keller	When You Trap a Tiger	Random House
2021	Carlos Hernandez	The Sal and Gabi duology: Sal and Gabi Break the Universe and Sal and Gabi Fix the Universe	Rick Riordan Presents
2021	Jenn Reese	A Game of Fox and Squirrels	Henry Holt
2022	Lori M. Lee*	Pahua and the Soul Stealer	Rick Riordan Presents
2022	Eden Royce*	Root Magic	Walden Pond Press
2022	Sayantani DasGupta	Kiranmala and the Kingdom Beyond trilogy	Scholastic
2022	Regina M. Hansen	The Coming Storm	Atheneum Books
2022	Tae Keller	When You Trap a Tiger	Random House
2023	Kelly Barnhill*	The Ogress and the Orphans	Algonquin Young Readers
2023	Tracy Badua	Freddie vs. the Family Curse	Clarion
2023	Kate DiCamillo	The Beatryce Prophecy	Candlewick Press
2023	Brian Farrey	The Counterclockwise Heart	Algonquin Young Readers
2023	L.D. Lapinski	Strangeworlds Travel Agency trilogy	
2023	Sofiya Pasternack	Black Bird, Blue Road	Versify
2023	Christina Soontornvat	The Last Mapmaker	Candlewick Press
2024	K. O'Neill*	The Moth Keeper	Random House Graphic
2024	Ethan M. Aldridge	Deephaven	Quill Tree Books
2024	Alechia Dow	Just a Pinch of Magic	Feiwel & Friends
2024	Rebecca Stead and Wendy Mass	The Lost Library	Feiwel & Friends
2024	Zach Weinersmith	Bea Wolf	First Second
2024	Patricia C. Wrede	The Dark Lord's Daughter	Random House
2025	Frances Hardinge and Emily Gravett*	Island of Whispers	Harry N. Abrams
2025	Rajani LaRocca	Sona and the Golden Beasts	Quill Tree Books
2025	Kaela Rivera	The Cece Rios trilogy	HarperCollins
2025	David A. Robertson	The Misewa Saga	Tundra Books
2025	Lisa Stringfellow	Kingdom of Dust	Quill Tree Books
2026	Aubrey Hartman*	The Undead Fox of Deadwood Forest	Little, Brown & Co
2026	Sachiko Kashiwaba and Avery Fischer Udagawa	The Village Beyond the Mist	Yonder
2026	Victor Pinñeiro	The Island of Forgotten Gods	Sourcebooks Young Readers
2026	David A. Robertson	The Misewa Saga	Tundra and Puffin Canada

=== Multiple wins and nominations ===
The following authors have received two or more Mythopoeic Fantasy Awards.

Wins	Author	Years
4	Patricia A. McKillip	1995, 2003, 2007, 2017 (Adult)
4	Ursula Vernon	2013, 2026 (Adult), 2016, 2021 (Children's)
3	Jane Yolen	1985, 1993 (Adult), 1998 (Children's)
2	Peter S. Beagle	1987, 2000 (Adult)
2	Joy Chant	1972, 1984
2	John Crowley	1982, 2018 (Adult)
2	Neil Gaiman	1999, 2006 (Adult)
2	Diana Wynne Jones	1996, 1999 (Children's)
2	Naomi Novik	2016, 2019 (Adult)
2	Delia Sherman	1994 (Adult), 2012 (Children's)
2	Mary Stewart	1971, 1974
2	Jo Walton	2010, 2022 (Adult)

The following authors have received four or more nominations.

Nominations	Author
15	Patricia A. McKillip
9	Ursula K. Le Guin
8	Robin McKinley
7	Neil Gaiman
7	Diana Wynne Jones
7	Jane Yolen
6	Terry Pratchett
5	Peter S. Beagle
5	Holly Black
5	Guy Gavriel Kay
5	Tim Powers
5	Jo Walton
4	Charles de Lint
4	Delia Sherman
4	Catherynne M. Valente
4	Gene Wolfe
4	Ursula Vernon

== Mythopoeic Scholarship Awards ==
There are two Mythopoeic Scholarship Awards since 1992 (and a Student Paper Award related to Mythcon, not covered here, since 2010). The Scholarship Award in Inklings Studies dates from 1971, in effect, its name was expanded in 1992.

Scholarly works have three years to win the award once and may be on the final ballot three times.

=== Inklings Studies ===
Winners are listed below.

- 1971 – C. S. Kilby; Mary McDermott Shideler
- 1972 – Walter Hooper
- 1973 – Master of Middle-earth by Paul H. Kocher
- 1974 – C. S. Lewis, Mere Christian by Kathryn Lindskoog
- 1975 – C. S. Lewis: A Biography by Roger Lancelyn Green and Walter Hooper
- 1976 – Tolkien Criticism by Richard C. West; C. S. Lewis, An Annotated Checklist by Joe R. Christopher and Joan K. Ostling; Charles W. S. Williams, A Checklist by Lois Glenn
- 1981 – Christopher Tolkien
- 1982 – The Inklings by Humphrey Carpenter
- 1983 – Companion to Narnia by Paul F. Ford
- 1984 – The Road to Middle-earth by T. A. Shippey
- 1985 – Reason and Imagination in C. S. Lewis by Peter J. Schakel
- 1986 – Charles Williams, Poet of Theology by Glen Cavaliero
- 1987 – J. R. R. Tolkien: Myth, Morality and Religion by Richard Purtill
- 1988 – C. S. Lewis by Joe R. Christopher
- 1989 – The Return of the Shadow by J. R. R. Tolkien, edited by Christopher Tolkien
- 1990 – The Annotated Hobbit by J. R. R. Tolkien, edited by Douglas A. Anderson
- 1991 – Jack: C. S. Lewis and His Times by George Sayer
- 1992 – Word and Story in C. S. Lewis, edited by Peter J. Schakel and Charles A. Huttar
- 1993 – Planets in Peril by David C. Downing
- 1994 – J. R. R. Tolkien, A Descriptive Bibliography by Wayne G. Hammond with the assistance of Douglas A. Anderson
- 1995 – C. S. Lewis in Context by Doris T. Myers
- 1996 – J. R. R. Tolkien: Artist and Illustrator by Wayne G. Hammond and Christina Scull
- 1997 – The Rhetoric of Vision: Essays on Charles Williams, ed. by Charles A. Huttar and Peter Schakel
- 1998 – A Question of Time: J. R. R. Tolkien's Road to Faërie by Verlyn Flieger
- 1999 – C. S. Lewis: A Companion and Guide by Walter Hooper
- 2000 – Roverandom by J. R. R. Tolkien, edited by Christina Scull and Wayne G. Hammond
- 2001 – J. R. R. Tolkien: Author of the Century by Tom Shippey
- 2002 – Tolkien's Legendarium: Essays on The History of Middle-earth, edited by Verlyn Flieger and Carl F. Hostetter
- 2003 – Beowulf and the Critics by J. R. R. Tolkien, edited by Michael D. C. Drout
- 2004 – Tolkien and the Great War: The Threshold of Middle-earth by John Garth
- 2005 – War and the Works of J.R.R. Tolkien by Janet Brennan Croft
- 2006 – The Lord of the Rings: A Reader's Companion by Wayne G. Hammond and Christina Scull
- 2007 – The J. R. R. Tolkien Companion and Guide by Wayne G. Hammond and Christina Scull
- 2008 – The Company They Keep: C. S. Lewis and J. R. R. Tolkien as Writers in Community by Diana Glyer; appendix by David Bratman
- 2009 – The History of the Hobbit by John D. Rateliff, Part One: Mr. Baggins; Part Two: Return to Bag-end
- 2010 – Tolkien, Race, and Cultural History: From Fairies to Hobbits by Dimitra Fimi
- 2011 – Planet Narnia by Michael Ward
- 2012 – Tolkien and Wales by Carl Phelpstead
- 2013 – Green Suns and Faërie: Essays on J.R.R. Tolkien by Verlyn Flieger
- 2014 – Tolkien and the Study of His Sources: Critical Essays by Jason Fisher, ed.
- 2015 – C. S. Lewis and the Middle Ages by Robert Boenig
- 2016 – Charles Williams: The Third Inkling by Grevel Lindop
- 2017 – The Fellowship: The Literary Lives of the Inklings: J.R.R. Tolkien, C. S. Lewis, Owen Barfield, Charles Williams by Philip Zaleski and Carol Zaleski
- 2018 – The Inklings and King Arthur: J. R. R. Tolkien, Charles Williams, C. S. Lewis, and Owen Barfield on the Matter of Britain by Sørina Higgins, ed.
- 2019 – There Would Always Be a Fairy Tale: More Essays on Tolkien by Verlyn Flieger
- 2020 – "The Sweet and the Bitter": Death and Dying in J.R.R. Tolkien's The Lord of the Rings by Amy Amendt-Raduege
- 2021 – Tolkien's Lost Chaucer by John M. Bowers
- 2022 – Tolkien's Modern Reading: Middle-earth Beyond the Middle Ages by Holly Ordway
- 2023 – Charles Williams and C.S. Lewis: Friends in Co-inherence by Paul S. Fiddes
- 2024 – Law, Government, and Society in J.R.R. Tolkien’s Works by José María Miranda Boto
- 2025 – The Collected Poems of J.R.R. Tolkien by Christina Scull and Wayne G. Hammond, editors.
- 2026 - The Tower and the Ruin: J.R.R. Tolkien’s Creation by Michael D.C. Drout

=== Myth & Fantasy Studies ===
Winners are listed below.

- 1992 – The Victorian Fantasists, edited by Kath Filmer
- 1993 – Strategies of Fantasy by Brian Attebery
- 1994 – Twentieth-Century Fantasists, edited by Kath Filmer
- 1995 – Old Tales and New Truths: Charting the Bright-Shadow World by James Roy King
- 1996 – From the Beast to the Blonde by Marina Warner
- 1997 – When Toys Come Alive by Lois Rostrow Kuznets
- 1998 – The Encyclopedia of Fantasy, edited by John Clute and John Grant
- 1999 – A Century of Welsh Myth in Children's Literature by Donna R. White
- 2000 – Strange and Secret Peoples: Fairies and Victorian Consciousness by Carole G. Silver
- 2001 – King Arthur in America by Alan Lupack and Barbara Tepa Lupack
- 2002 – The Owl, the Raven & the Dove: The Religious Meaning of the Grimms' Magic Fairy Tales by G. Ronald Murphy
- 2003 – Fairytale in the Ancient World by Graham Anderson
- 2004 – The Myth of the American Superhero by John Shelton Lawrence and Robert Jewett
- 2005 – Robin Hood: A Mythic Biography by Stephen Thomas Knight
- 2006 – National Dreams: The Remaking of Fairy Tales in Nineteenth-Century England by Jennifer Schacker
- 2007 – Gemstone of Paradise: The Holy Grail in Wolfram's Parzival by G. Ronald Murphy, S.J.
- 2008 – The Shadow-Walkers: Jacob Grimm's Mythology of the Monstrous by Tom Shippey
- 2009 – Four British Fantasists: Place and Culture in the Children's Fantasies of Penelope Lively, Alan Garner, Diana Wynne Jones, and Susan Cooper by Charles Butler
- 2010 – One Earth, One People: The Mythopoeic Fantasy Series of Ursula K. Le Guin, Lloyd Alexander, Madeleine L'Engle and Orson Scott Card by Marek Oziewicz
- 2011 – The Victorian Press and the Fairy Tale by Caroline Sumpter
- 2012 – The Enchanted Screen by Jack Zipes
- 2013 – Song of the Vikings: Snorri and the Making of Norse Myths by Nancy Marie Brown
- 2014 – Tree of Salvation: Yggdrasil and the Cross in the North by G. Ronald Murphy
- 2015 – Stories About Stories: Fantasy and the Remaking of Myth by Brian Attebery
- 2016 – The Evolution of Modern Fantasy: From Antiquarianism to the Ballantine Adult Fantasy Series by Jamie Williamson
- 2017 – Elf Queens and Holy Friars: Fairy Beliefs and the Medieval Church by Richard Firth Green
- 2018 – Children's Fantasy Literature: An Introduction by Michael Levy and Farah Mendlesohn
- 2019 – Celtic Myth in Contemporary Children's Fantasy: Idealization, Identity, Ideology by Dimitra Fimi
- 2020 – A Modernist Fantasy: Modernism, Anarchism, and the Radical Fantastic by James Gifford
- 2021 – Fantasies of Time and Death: Dunsany, Eddison, Tolkien by Anna Vaninskaya
- 2022 – The Modern Myths: Adventures in the Machinery of the Popular Imagination by Philip Ball
- 2023 – Fantasy: How It Works by Brian Attebery
- 2024 – An Introduction to Fantasy by Matthew Sangster
- 2025 – Urban Fantasy: Exploring Modernity through Magic by Stefan Ekman
- 2026 - Fantasy: A Short History by Adam Roberts
