= Fool's Run =

1987 novel written by Patricia A. McKillip

- Cover of first edition
- Author: Patricia A. McKillip
- Cover artist: Michael Whelan
- Language: English
- Genre: Science fiction
- Publisher: Warner Books
- Publication date: 1987
- Publication place: United States
- Media type: Print (hardcover)
- Pages: ix, 221
- ISBN: 0-446-51278-8

Fool's Run is a science fiction novel by Patricia A. McKillip. It was first published in hardcover by Warner Books in April 1987, with a paperback edition issued by Questar/Popular Library in February 1988. The first British edition was published in paperback by Orbit in June 1987, with a hardcover edition following from Macdonald in August of the same year. The novel has also been translated into Italian.

== Summary ==
Seven years ago, Terra Viridian was convicted of mass murder for the senseless massacre of 1500 people, and sentenced to the orbiting prison colony known as the Underworld.

Now various people scarred or obsessed by the crime converge on the prison seeking answers. All have been somehow touched by projections of the maddening, invasive visions that have overwhelmed Terra's mind. Those affected include Sydney the space musicologist, a scientist with a device capable of displaying her mental images, patroller Aaron Fisher, whose wife died in the massacre and who is still hunting Terra's twin sister Michele, Magic Man the Bach master, and his protégé, the mysterious golden-masked musician called the Queen of Hearts.

The Queen of Hearts, whose band has been booked to perform an experimental rock concert in the prison, harbors her own a secret. Unknown to all, including her lover Aaron, she is herself Terra's sister, having gone into hiding after her twin's crime.

Brought face to face by the concert, the sisters' psychic connection triggers a change of events that changes everyone's lives. When Terra escapes, the pursuit that follows forces all the characters to deal with the reality behind her visions; an extra-galactic alien life form struggling towards birth.

== Reception ==
Critical reception of the book was mixed.

Sybil Steinberg in Publishers Weekly calls the novel "[a] disappointing book from a talented author of children's SF," while observing that "[t]he denouement, like the body of this impressionistic novel, combines cliches, romantic gestures and the occasional clever gambit, such as a pianist reprogramming security codes so they'll only respond to Bach played on a harpsichord."

Jackie Cassada in Library Journal views it more favorably, writing "[f]antasy author McKillip switches gears smoothly in this high-tech sf adventure for adult and YA collections."

Francis Deutsch Louis in The Christian Science Monitor finds "[t]his book ... so beautifully conceived and produced that it is almost as much high art as high-tech. ... 'Fool's Run' is an original composition that is no more describable than the mystery it spins around."

Rosemary Smith in School Library Journal, noting that "YA—Master of fantasy McKillip has turned her considerable talents to science fiction," calls the book "a riveting tale of romance and mystery." She concludes "[t]he strong emphasis on music and the rock group that plays it will appeal to YA readers as will the language that amazes and delights at every turn."

The book was also reviewed by Debbie Notkin in Locus no. 315, April 1987, Charles de Lint in Fantasy Review, June 1987, Don D'Ammassa in Science Fiction Chronicle no. 95, August 1987, and Sue Thomason in Paperback Inferno no. 68, 1987.

== Awards ==
The novel placed fourteenth in the 1988 Locus Poll Award for Best Science Fiction Novel.
