= The Changeling Sea =

1988 fantasy novel by Patricia A. McKillip

- Cover of first edition
- Author: Patricia A. McKillip
- Language: English
- Genre: Fantasy
- Publisher: Atheneum/Macmillan
- Publication date: 1988
- Publication place: United States
- Media type: Print (hardcover)
- Pages: 137
- ISBN: 0-689-31436-1

The Changeling Sea is a fantasy novel for juvenile readers by Patricia A. McKillip. It was first published in hardcover by Atheneum/Macmillan in October 1988, with a paperback edition issued by Del Rey/Ballantine in December 1989. It was subsequently reissued in paperback and ebook by Firebird/Penguin in April 2003. The first British edition was published in hardcover by Oxford University Press in September 1991, with an ebook edition following from Gateway/Orion in December 2015.

== Summary ==
The sea has drowned Peri's fisherman father and cast her mother into a deep depression. When the only caring figure left in her life, the wise woman who taught her magic, also disappears, Peri takes up residence in the old woman's cottage and plots revenge. She crafts three hexes to curse the sea. She is visited by the king's son Prince Kir, hoping for the wise woman's aid in curing his own haunting obsession with the sea.

When Peri completes her hexes and casts them into the water, she includes an offering from the prince. To her surprise, her magic succeeds beyond expectations, disrupting the sea queen's magic. A chained sea dragon appears, the wandering magician Lyo arrives in the village in response, and Kir's sea-dreams grow even more tortured.

Peri's efforts to help Kir eventually lead to her undertaking a strange journey into the depths, uncovering a tragic secret from the king's past and the true identity of the sea dragon, and a dawning realization of her own power.

== Reception ==
Publishers Weekly writes "[b]eautifully sustained metaphors and an even tone make this fantasy, like McKillip's The Forgotten Beasts of Eld, a pleasure to read. Further, McKillip's deft characterization and smooth, tender resolution result in a memorable, often poignant novel."

Susan L. Rogers in School Library Journal calls the book "[a]n enchanting fantasy that is tinged with realism and romance."

Ann F. Howey, in an in-depth article in Journal of the Fantastic Arts, notes that "The Changeling Sea is not the only one of McKillip's texts to employ feminist strategies, but it is significant that it does to for a younger audience." She feels "McKillip's novel empowers its female protagonist" and "suggests to its young readers (and reminds its not-so-young readers) that regardless of gender or class they have heroic potential, and the power to change themselves and possibly their world."

Matthew David Surridge at Blackgate.com deems the novel "excellent," judging it "precisely in the way it evokes the feel of a folktale, the feel of myth mixed with the matter of common life, that the book shines." He praises "the feel of the book, which has one of the more distinct tones of any genre fantasy I've come across," and notes that the author "subtly establishes the sea in this book as a kind of mythic underworld. It’s the land of Tolkien’s Faërie. The otherworld. That place beyond the fields we know to which our protagonist must venture to set things right. The title of the novel is precisely correct: the sea is the place of changes, ... a place of story, and things shift there as they do in fable." He concludes: "Formally, the story has strong romance aspects, but it’s also a comedy of a very old kind: a comedy in which the world is set to rights. It’s a romance in the old sense. Just as we see the magic edge-on, so we see the story. As the book goes on we realise we’ve come in at the end, that the trouble that set everything in motion began a generation ago. There was something tragic in the past, as fathers and mothers made their mistakes; but this is a comedy-romance, so it is a story of young people undoing the snarl their elders made. And it is effective, touching and quietly powerful."

The book was also reviewed by Tom Whitmore in Locus no. 336, January 1989, and Baird Searles in Isaac Asimov's Science Fiction Magazine v. 14, no. 9, September 1990.

== Awards ==
The novel was nominated for the 1990 Mythopoeic Fantasy Award, and placed eighteenth in the 1989 Locus Poll Award for Best Fantasy Novel.
