= Stepping From the Shadows =

Fantasy novel

Stepping from the Shadows
- Cover of first edition
- Author: Patricia A. McKillip
- Language: English
- Genre: Bildungsroman
- Publisher: Atheneum
- Publication date: 1982
- Publication place: United States
- Media type: Print (hardcover)
- Pages: 207
- ISBN: 0-689-11211-4

Stepping from the Shadows is a novel by Patricia A. McKillip. It was first published in hardcover by Atheneum in 1982, with a paperback edition issued by Berkley Books in August 1984.

== Summary ==
The semi-autobiographical coming of age story of Frances Stuart, a sensitive, imaginative child and "army brat" whose life is disrupted by her family's moves from Arizona to Germany and England. As a second grader in a nun-taught parochial school she is instill with dread of sin and retribution, and as she grows she continues to be tormented by self-judgment and discomfort in regard to her sexuality. The former she unloads in writing on an invented "shadow sister," while the latter she symbolizes as a "Stagman" who appears to her when she experiences unwelcome erotic feelings. These fixations continue to trouble her as a college student in Los Angeles and as she strikes out on her own, finding her own voice as a writer in the Pacific Northwest and ultimately a writers' colony in New England.

== Reception ==
Barbara A. Bannon in Publishers Weekly, noting McKillip's status as "[a]n author of outstanding books for younger readers," calls this, "her first novel for adults, a real spellbinder." She observes the story's "sensitive, balladlike prose" and calls the section on the protagonist as a college woman in California "the story's high point."

Charles Champlin in the Los Angeles Times finds the book "rich, particular and extremely appealing," characterizing it as "a beautifully written, honest, frequently funny and self-unsparing chronicle ... of the growing up of a young woman who cannot be different, in any significant spiritual way, from McKillip herself. In its unassertive intimacy and fragility--and despite its rare literary grace--"Stepping From the Shadows" seems a small publishing miracle, whose appearance on the spring list means that an editor loved it, not that anyone thought it would make a dime."

Joyce Smothers in Library Journal calls the book "a departure from the author's seven award-winning fantasy novels for young adults," an "obscure, challenging novel of psychological realism," "[r]ich in poetic description ... long on introspection and short on plot." She notes that a "variety of exotic settings add to the novel," and recommends it "for large fiction collections, and for the perceptive reader."

The Hartford Courant praised the novel for "vivid imaginings" and "lyrical prose."

The book was also reviewed by Phyllis J. Day in Science Fiction & Fantasy Book Review no. 10, December 1982, Charles de Lint in Dragonfields: Tales of Fantasy no. 4, Winter 1983, and Robert Coulson in Amazing Stories v. 59, no. w, September 1985.
