= Od Magic =

2005 novel by Patricia A. McKillip

- First edition cover
- Author: Patricia A. McKillip
- Cover artist: Kinuko Y. Craft
- Language: English
- Genre: Fantasy
- Publisher: Ace Books
- Publication date: June 7, 2005
- Publication place: United States
- Media type: Print
- Pages: 320
- ISBN: 0-441-01248-5
- Dewey Decimal: 813/.54 22
- LC Class: PS3563.C38 O425 2005

Od Magic is a 2005 fantasy novel by American writer Patricia A. McKillip. It was a 2006 nominee for World Fantasy Award for Best Novel.

== Summary ==
The wizard Od, a mysterious giantess who travels accompanied by the numerous animals which she has healed, once saved the city of Kelior in Numis from invasion, founded a school of magic there, then wandered the world, returning to the school only sporadically since then. Hundreds of years later, she appears at small northern farm of Brenden Vetch, a sorrowful and solitary young man, and invites him to become the gardener of magical plants at her school. He makes the long journey to the city and must acclimate himself to the strange new environment.

Kelior's magic school, instead of being a bastion for magical learning and exploration, is closely regulated by the king. The students, almost all children of the rich and powerful, learn a narrow mindset, subservient to the king's wishes. The king and his young wizard counselor Valoren Greye see any uncontrolled magic, no matter how small, as a threat to order and safety. The school's leading wizard, Yar Ayrwood, disillusioned with the rigid life at the school, is the lover of Valoren's widowed cousin, Ceta Thiel, a historian who makes puzzling discoveries while writing a history of Od.

The king arranges for his daughter Princess Sulys to become engaged with the unemotional Valoren, a man she scarcely knows. She wishes to speak with Valoren, to let him know that she has some magical powers which she practices with her elderly great-grandmother. But Valoren pays no attention to her, becoming obsessed with both the mysterious new gardener as well as a new magician, Tyramin, who has brought a popular magic show to the Twilight Quarter of the city. Believing Tyramin to be dangerous, Valoren arranges for the Twilight Quarter's warden, the bored Arneth Pyt, to investigate the magician. As a consequence, Arneth falls in love with Tyramin's daughter, the enigmatic Mistral, and attempts to help her.

Brenden's innocent trip to the Twilight Quarter to inquire about a strange plant leads to the public exposure of his strong magical powers. This revelation stirs the king and Valoren's paranoia and sets off a wild manhunt for both Brenden and Tyramin. The situation is further inflamed by the apparent disappearance of Princess Sulys, though she is close by in the school's labyrinth trying unsuccessfully to get Valoren's attention. Yar is forced to search the Twilight Quarter for the fugitives, unintentionally accompanied by the curious new student Elver, and they encounter Brenden. Brenden, fearing the pursuit of the relentless Valoren, then flees to a mysterious mountain in the far north and hides among the ancient magical rock-like beings who took refuge there long ago. Yar, using a magical gateway in the school's labyrinth discovered by Sulys and Ceta, follows Brenden. After the pursuing Valoren also arrives, Elver appears and is revealed to be Od.

Meanwhile, the king agrees to a peace-offering request from Tyramin to perform in the palace. Afterward, Sulys' attempt to hide the magician's troupe with her magic is discovered and she informs her shocked father about her harmless, though illegal, magic use. Mistral reveals publicly that Tyramin has been dead for some time, and she has used her real magic to impersonate him during performances. Od, Yar, and a visibly shaken Valoren return, accompanied by the magical beings. Brenden returns to his human form. Od says that she wants her school to continue, but only without the heavy restrictions imposed by the king, which she experienced while posing as Elver. Otherwise, she will move the school to another land. The king quickly accepts. Brenden agrees to stay to assist overwhelmed Valoren and the amazed school wizards in learning to communicate and live in peace with the beings, who embody the wonder of wild magic. Od departs to look for another gardener.

== Nominations ==
- 2006 Mythopoeic Fantasy Award for Adult Literature Finalist
