= Patrice Kindl =

American novelist

- Born: 1951 (age 74–75); Alplaus, New York, U.S.
- Occupation: Novelist
- Writing career
- Notable awards: Mythopoeic Award (1995)

Patrice Kindl (born 1951 in Alplaus, New York) is an American novelist. She won the 1995 Mythopoeic Fantasy Award, Children's Fiction, for the novel Owl in Love.

== Awards ==
- 1995, Mythopoeic Fantasy Award, Children's Fiction, Owl in Love

== Bibliography ==
- Owl in Love (1993)
- The Woman in the Wall (1997)
- Goose Chase (2001)
- Lost in the Labyrinth (2002)
- Keeping the Castle (2012)
- A School for Brides: A Story of Maidens, Mystery and Matrimony (2015)
- Don't You Trust Me? (2016)
