= The Riddle-Master of Hed =

1976 novel by Patricia A. McKillip

- First edition cover
- Author: Patricia A. McKillip
- Language: English
- Series: The Riddle Master Trilogy
- Genre: Fantasy
- Publisher: Atheneum Books
- Publication date: 1976
- Publication place: United States
- Media type: Print (Hardback & Paperback)
- Pages: 227
- ISBN: 0-345-28881-5
- OCLC: 26499776
- Followed by: Heir of Sea and Fire

Map of Hed and its neighbors drawn by Kathy McKillip.

The Riddle-Master of Hed is a fantasy novel by American writer Patricia A. McKillip and the first book of her Riddle Master trilogy. The novel and trilogy utilize themes from Celtic mythology.

== Setting ==
In a fantasy world, the ruler of each land has a mystical awareness of his or her land called the land-rule. The seldom-seen High One presides over all. Riddles, typically questions about obscure pieces of lore, feature significantly, as well as shapeshifting magic.

== Plot summary ==
The titular Riddle-Master is Morgon, the Prince of Hed, a small, simple island populated by farmers and swineherds. The prince, inexplicably, has three stars on his forehead.

Morgon's sister Tristan discovers that he keeps a crown hidden under his bed. He explains that he won it in a riddle-game with the ghost of the cursed king Peven of Aum; he would have died had he lost, as had many who took up the challenge. When Deth, the High One's harpist, discovers this, he explains that another king, Mathom of An, has pledged to marry his daughter Raederle to the man who wins that crown from the ghost.

Accompanied by Deth, Morgon sets forth to claim his bride. En route, the ship is sunk by mysterious shapechangers. Shipwrecked, Morgon loses his memory and the power of speech. When Deth finds Morgon again, after he has regained both, Morgon resolves to travel to question the High One about the shapechangers. The High One's home, located in the far north on Erlenstar Mountain, is seldom visited. As Morgon and Deth travel the length of the realm, they are repeatedly attacked by the shapechangers, and Morgon learns more and more perilous knowledge concerning the three stars and the great powers which come with them. He also comes to know personally the land rulers of Ymris, Herun, Osterland, and Isig.

== Critical reception ==
The novel was voted #13 in Locus' 1987 "All-Time Best Fantasy Novels" reader poll. It was later voted #22 in their 1998 poll (for books published before 1990).
