= The Night Gift =

1976 novel by Patricia A. McKillip

- Cover of first edition
- Author: Patricia A. McKillip
- Illustrator: Kathy McKillip
- Cover artist: Kathy McKillip
- Language: English
- Genre: Young adult fiction
- Publisher: Atheneum
- Publication date: 1976
- Publication place: United States
- Media type: Print (hardcover)
- Pages: 156
- ISBN: 0-689-30508-7

The Night Gift is a novel for juvenile readers by Patricia A. McKillip, first published in hardcover by Atheneum in June 1976 and reprinted in trade paperback by Aladdin/Atheneum in April 1980.

== Summary ==
Young Joe Takaoto, finding his room and life ugly, attempts suicide and is sent to a sanitorium. His sister Barbara resolves to create a haven of beauty for him to help him recover.

Barbara's high school friend Joslyn relates the story of how the two of them, joined by their friend Claudia (who is shy because of her cleft palate), fix up a room for Joe in an abandoned old shack, painting it and decorating it with windchimes, shells, plants, books and such. Joslyn's own brother Brian also assists, and helps Claudia gain more confidence. Bringing down a redwood sapling from the mountains the girls get a ride back from Neil, Joslyn's crush. Learning he actually likes Barbara, she buries her disappointment, putting friendship first.

When Joe comes home, his seeming indifference to the project leaves the friends bereft. Only after he returns to the sanitarium do they discover he did value their gift.

== Reception ==
Christine Mozlin in School Library Journal calls the book "a poignant story" in which "the almost lyrical descriptions of setting and emotion totally involve readers in the plot and in the personal problems of the characters."
