= Kingfisher (McKillip novel) =

2016 fantasy novel by Patricia A. McKillip

- Cover of first edition
- Author: Patricia A. McKillip
- Language: English
- Genre: Fantasy
- Publisher: Ace Books
- Publication date: 2016
- Publication place: United States
- Media type: Print (hardcover), ebook
- Pages: 346
- ISBN: 978-0-425-27176-6

Kingfisher is a fantasy novel by Patricia A. McKillip. It was first published in hardcover and ebook by Ace Books in February 2016. The first British edition was published in ebook by Gateway/Orion in June 2017.

== Summary ==
The novel is an Arthurian grail quest type of story set in a world "in which the modern lives side-by-side with the mythical," with kings, knights and magic co-existing with automobiles, electricity, and even cell phones.

Restless young Pierce Oliver chafes in his life working for the restaurant of his sorceress mother Heloise. A band of lost knights gives him a taste of a larger world, and he decides to seek his fortune in Severluna, the capital of the Wyvern King Arden. This infuriates Heloise, who reveals that Pierce's absent father had himself been a knight of King Arden's court, and after living with Heloise a year had abandoned her and returned to it, taking with him their older son. Pregnant at the time with Pierce, and determined not to lose him as well, she had kept in ignorance of his heritage.

Despite this revelation, Pierce leaves anyway. On the way to Severluna he witnesses a strange ritual at the Kingfisher Inn in nearby Chimera Bay. We are introduced to a cook there, Carrie, daughter of Merle, who has her own family problems and mysteries.

Prince Daimon, illegitimate youngest son of King Arden, is a third viewpoint character, whose life is changed with his father reveals the truth about his mother and her hidden realm. In the wake of this revelation the king gathers his knights and announces a quest to find a magical cauldron, an ancient, powerful artifact, entangling the lives of all three protagonists.

== Reception ==
Kirkus Reviews calls the novel a "delicately wrought, twinkle-eyed fantasy from the accomplished author of The Bards of Bone Plain," who "skillfully blends a thoroughly modern passion for technology and seafood with folklore, myth, and magic in a narrative consistently full of surprises," though "[t]he characters ... aren't always fully drawn," and "[i]t's disconcerting to realize that most of McKillip's characters have, at first, no idea what's going on--and the few that do are saying nothing." The reviewer finds that "the overlarge back story too often merely tantalizes," but "Fantasy lovers looking for a lighter touch amid all those vampires, zombies, werewolves, and industrial-strength malefactors will find this a refreshing change of pace."

Charles de Lint in The Magazine of Fantasy & Science Fiction writes "A NEW Patricia McKillip book is always a cause for celebration. McKillip has never disappointed me, regardless of how she flits about genres. She’s written high fantasy, contemporary fantasy, science fiction, and horror, leaving her own distinct fingerprint on each so that in the end the best classification is that she writes McKillip novels." He notes "The title of the book—Kingfisher—is a giveaway as to its underlying theme. This is an Arthurian story, through and through, with all the familiar elements set slightly askew but no less recognizable for that." He further states that "Kingfisher is McKillip writing at the peak of her game — which is amazing when you consider how long she’s been at it. I loved the richness of the story and characters, the mingling of old with new, mythic with contemporary, and can’t wait to reread it."

Michelle West, also in The Magazine of Fantasy & Science Fiction, gives the book a "highly recommended" rating, praising McKillip as "an author of my youth who has never been visited by the suck fairies — or, putting it another way, rereading her as I get older reveals layers and textures in her writing I missed the first time through." She notes that "[t]here is more — there's always more, in McKillip's work. She has always been adept at creating people who are profoundly human, but she has also been the master of magic, of creating magic that feels wild and larger than life and all-encompassing. In lesser hands, the magic becomes the focus; in McKillip's, it's wed, always, to the people whom it affects, and the results of this are almost alchemical; she takes the base materials and transmutes the whole into pure gold. She lets people be people in all their complications: their wrongs, their rights, their strengths and weaknesses."

The novel was also reviewed by Gary K. Wolfe in Locus no. 664, May 2016, and Gautam Bhatia (2016) in Strange Horizons, 12 September 2016.

== Awards ==
The novel won the 2017 Mythopoeic Fantasy Award for Adult Literature, and placed twelfth in the 2017 Locus Poll Award for Best Fantasy Novel.
