= Harpist in the Wind =

1979 novel by Patricia A. McKillip

- First edition cover
- Author: Patricia A. McKillip
- Language: English
- Series: The Riddle Master Trilogy
- Genre: Fantasy
- Publisher: Atheneum Books
- Publication date: 1979
- Publication place: United States
- Media type: Print (Hardcover & Paperback)
- Pages: 256
- Award: Locus Award for Best Fantasy Novel (1980)
- ISBN: 0-689-30687-3
- OCLC: 4498454
- LC Class: PZ7.M19864 Har 1979
- Preceded by: Heir of Sea and Fire, (1977)

Harpist in the Wind is a 1979 fantasy novel by American writer Patricia A. McKillip. It is the concluding book of the Riddle Master trilogy, which has also been published as Riddle of Stars. The first UK paperback edition preceded the first US paperback.

== Plot summary ==
Morgon of Hed and Raederle of An set out to discover who the shapechangers who pursue them are, and where the High One, the source of the land-law binding the realm together, is hiding. Along the way they are helped by the wizards of the realm, recently released by Morgon from the bonds in which Ghisteslwchlohm had held them, and by the land-heirs/rulers. After confronting Ghisteslwchlohm in the city of Lungold, where the wizard once had ruled, Morgon is imprisoned by the shapechangers within Erlenstar Mountain, as they do not want to kill him. They, the exiled Earth-Masters, need him to reach the High One, who prevents them from exercising full power. He escapes with the help of Raederle and someone who is later revealed to be the High One in disguise. Seeking refuge in the far north, he begins to learn the land-law of each kingdom. Once he has partially learned all of the land-law, Morgon discovers that the High One had journeyed with him as both the harpist Deth and the wizard Yrth. The High One tells Morgon at the top of Wind Plain that he (Morgon) is the High One's land-heir. When the High One is killed by Ghisteslwchlohm, now possessed by the shape changers, with Morgon's three-starred sword, Morgon learns to shape and/or bind the winds to overcome the Earth-Masters and bring peace to the land; he truly is the High One's heir.

== Setting ==
In the trilogy, land-law resides with the land-ruler of each of the kingdoms within the realm. Land-rulers are ostensibly aware of all of the entities within their kingdom. They can sense each creature, each plant, each rock. The High One, in McKillip's creation, seems to have the same relationship with the entire realm, as he started to bind all of the land-law when he sensed that the Earth-Master Eriel began to gather power for her own ends. When the land-law passes on, the land-heir suddenly becomes aware of everything in his or her kingdom, or in the entire realm.

== Awards and recognition ==
- 1980, Harpist in the Wind was nominated for the Hugo Award for Best Novel
- 1980, Locus Award for Best Fantasy Novel
