= Harrowing the Dragon =

2005 collection of fantasy short stories by Patricia A. McKillip

- Cover of first edition
- Author: Patricia A. McKillip
- Cover artist: Kinuko Y. Craft
- Language: English
- Genre: Fantasy
- Publisher: Ace Books
- Publication date: 2005
- Publication place: United States
- Media type: Print (hardcover)
- Pages: 310
- ISBN: 978-0-441-01360-9
- OCLC: 61179641

Harrowing the Dragon is a collection of fantasy short stories by Patricia A. McKillip. It was first published in hardcover and ebook by Ace Books in November 2005, and in trade paperback by the same publisher in November 2006. The first British edition was issued in ebook by Gateway/Orion on December 17, 2015.

== Summary ==
The book collects fifteen novelettes and short stories by the author, all originally published in anthologies.

== Contents ==
- "The Harrowing of the Dragon of Hoarsbreath" (from Elsewhere, Vol. II, Nov. 1982) - a young dragon harrower and a girl from a mining village clash over whether the land's long winter is caused by a dragon.
- "A Matter of Music" (from Elsewhere, Vol. III, Apr. 1984)
- "A Troll and Two Roses" (from Faery!, Jan. 1985)
- "Baba Yaga and the Sorcerer's Son" (from Dragons and Dreams: A Collection of New Fantasy and Science Fiction Stories, Apr. 1986)
- "The Fellowship of the Dragon" (from After the King: Stories in Honor of J. R. R. Tolkien, Jan. 1992) - Five young women are tasked by their queen with saving her lover, the court harper.
- "Lady of the Skulls" (from Strange Dreams, Jul. 1993) - a story of personal transformation requiring a knight to look past what meets the eye.
- "The Snow Queen" (from Snow White, Blood Red, Jan. 1993) - retelling the familiar fairy tale in a contemporary setting, highlighting the universality of love, loyalty and desire.
- "Ash, Wood, Fire" (from The Women's Press Book of New Myth and Magic, Nov. 1993) - the story of a cinder-girl who has reduced the people around her to their functions as she sinks into her own essence.
- "The Stranger" (from Temporary Walls: An Anthology of Moral Fantasy, Oct. 1993)
- "Transmutations" (from Xanadu 2, Jan. 1994)
- "The Lion and the Lark" (from The Armless Maiden and Other Tales for Childhood's Survivors, Apr. 1995) - a "beauty and the beast" retelling, in which a young woman loves a shapechanger, loses him, and must prove her love through many tests and trials.
- "The Witches of Junket" (from Sisters in Fantasy II, Apr. 1996)
- "Star-Crossed" (from Shakespearean Whodunnits, Sep. 1997) - the Verona constabulary investigate the deaths of Romeo and Juliet.
- "Voyage Into the Heart" (from Voyages: The 25th World Fantasy Convention, Nov. 4, 1999) a heartless hunt to acquire a unicorn's horn.
- "Toad" (from Silver Birch, Blood Moon, Mar. 1999) - a "frog prince" retelling in which the prince is far from innocent.

== Reception ==
In a starred review, Publishers Weekly calls the book an "excellent story collection" in which McKillip "take[s] the most common fantasy elements--dragons and bards, sorcerers and shape-shifters--and reshape[s] them in surprising and resonant ways. ... Each of these tales is a gem of story-telling, a rich treasure for both fans and those yet to discover McKillip's deceptively simple magic."

Roland Green, writing in Booklist, finds the collection "a valiant rescue from out-of-print limbo of stories whose high readability demonstrates that McKillip is one of the most distinguished, if least publicized, modern fantasy writers." He notes that it "displays a variety of well-written treatments of other material [from] traditional folklore" and that "[f]antasy collections should assign the book high priority for acquisition.

Jackie Cassada in Library Journal, referring to McKillip as "one of fantasy's most elegant and luminescent writers," rates the book as "highly recommended," describing it as a "lyrical volume" and "a superb choice for adult and YA fantasy collections."

Sandy Freund in School Library Journal calls the collection "outstanding," stating that "McKillip's elegant prose explores the nature of love, friendship, wisdom, and change, often with a touch of humor."

Francisca Goldsmith, also in School Library Journal, lists it among the year's best adult books for high school students. In her brief write-up, she echoes Freund's findings.

Donna Scanlon in Kliatt highlights the volume as an exceptional book and recommends it for senior high school students and for advanced students in adults. She feels "[t]he stories amply reflect [McKillip's] range and depth as an author: some are serious, some lighter, and all express an impressive grasp of the range of human emotions and motivations." She observes that "McKillip often injects a touch of humor to relieve tension and maintain perspective. Her language is always rich and selective but not self-conscious, and her books belong in any library, not only for leisure reading but as outstanding examples of quality writing."

The collection was also reviewed by Christine Mains in SFRA Review no. 274, 2005, and by Faren Miller in Locus no. 538, November 2005.
