= Wonders of the Invisible World (McKillip collection) =

2012 collection of fantasy short stories by Patricia A. McKillip

- Cover of first edition
- Author: Patricia A. McKillip
- Cover artist: Thomas Canty
- Language: English
- Genre: Fantasy
- Publisher: Tachyon Publications
- Publication date: 2012
- Publication place: United States
- Media type: Print (trade paperback)
- Pages: 288
- ISBN: 978-1-61696-087-2
- OCLC: 785874428

Wonders of the Invisible World is a collection of fantasy short stories by Patricia A. McKillip. It was first published in trade paperback and ebook by Tachyon Publications in October 2012. The title of both the collection and the first story in it derive from the 1693 book of the same title by Cotton Mather.

== Summary ==
The book collects sixteen novellas, novelettes and short stories by the author, all originally published in anthologies, together with one speech and an introduction by Charles de Lint.

== Contents ==
- "Introduction" by Charles de Lint
- "Wonders of the Invisible World" (from Full Spectrum 5, Aug. 1995) - a researcher goes back in time to record Cotton Mather's religious visions, finding his ravings not what they expected.
- "Out of the Woods" (from Flights: Extreme Visions of Fantasy, Jun. 2004) - a reflection on how magic is often missed by those searching for it.
- "The Kelpie" (from The Fair Folk, Jan. 2005) - a story of courtship and obsession illustrating the overlap between life and art.
- "Hunter's Moon" (from The Green Man: Tales from the Mythic Forest, May 2002) - a seductive, chilling encounter with the dangers of Faerie.
- "Oak Hill" (from The Essential Bordertown, Aug. 1998) - an ugly young woman on the way to Bordertown is trapped in a terrifying cityscape known as Oak Hill, and explores it in search of magic.
- "The Fortune-Teller" (from The Coyote Road: Trickster Tales, Jun. 2007) - a young woman thieves a pack of strange cards from an unconscious roadside fortune-teller.
- "Jack O'Lantern" (from Firebirds Rising: An Anthology of Original Science Fiction and Fantasy, Apr. 2006) - a young girl struggling with the impending marriage of her sister seeks out magic during a picnic, fearing it will her last chance before she grows up.
- "Knight of the Well" (from A Book of Wizards, May 2008) - a society built around the veneration of water finds that element inexplicably rejecting them.
- "Naming Day" (from Wizards: Magical Tales from the Masters of Modern Fantasy, May 2007) - a teenage witch who cannot decide on her magical name is compelled to chase after an imp during the titular Naming Day Ceremony.
- "Byndley" (from Firebirds: An Anthology of Original Fantasy and Science Fiction, Sep. 2003) - a man who once escaped the world of faerie seeks to return that which he stole.
- "The Twelve Dancing Princesses" (from A Wolf at the Door and Other Retold Fairy Tales, Jul. 2000) - a macabre retelling of a traditional fairy tale.
- "Undine" (from The Faery Reel: Tales from the Twilight Realm, Jun. 2004) - a water spirit falls victim to her own prey.
- "Xmas Cruise" (from Christmas Forever, Nov. 1993) - a surreal tale that follows two couples aboard an environmentalism cruise.
- "A Gift to Be Simple" (from Not of Woman Born, Mar. 1999) - a fictional pseudo-Christian religious faction realize that their numbers are dwindling and decide to take drastic action.
- "The Old Woman and the Storm" (from Imaginary Lands, Dec. 1985) - an allegory.
- "The Doorkeeper of Khaat" (from Full Spectrum 2, Apr. 1989) - a science fiction tale regarding two alien species with very different cultures, and the poet who attempts to cross that divide in search of meaning and art.
- "What Inspires Me: Guest of Honor Speech at WisCon 28, 2004"

== Reception ==
Calling McKillip an "[e]ndlessly astonishing and impressive fantasist" in a starred review of the collection, Publishers Weekly writes that the author "travels the shadowy twilight realm between worlds and returns with the raw stuff of dreams. ... With a tremendous range ... McKillip charts the wild unknown in all its pathos and danger. Reshaping ancient archetypes to show us hidden aspects of ourselves and the world around us, these modern myths are timely and timeless, retaining the cosmic resonance of folklore while addressing the struggles embodied in achingly realized spirits, gods, and humans who endure tragic flaws and sudden epiphanies".

Jackie Cassada in Library Journal characterizes the contents as "mesmerizing short fiction", noting that "[a]ny collection of McKillip's short stories will be a valuable asset to any library and a joy to her many fans". She observes that "[t]he text of her Guest of Honor speech as WisCon 2004 ... offers valuable insight into themind of the writer".

The collection was also reviewed by Maureen Kincaid Speller in Interzone no. 242, September-October 2012; Gary K. Wolfe in Locus no. 620, September 2012; Faren Miller in Locus no. 621, October 2012; Paul Di Filippo in Barnes & Noble Review, 2012; Chris Kammerud in Strange Horizons, 17 December 2012; and Joe Milicia in The New York Review of Science Fiction, January 2013.
