= Isidore Haiblum =

American novelist

- Born: May 23, 1935; Brooklyn, New York City, US
- Died: October 25, 2012 (aged 77); New York City, US
- Occupation: Novelist

Isidore Haiblum (May 23, 1935 – October 25, 2012) was an American author of science fiction, fantasy and mystery novels. He was nominated for the Mythopoeic Fantasy Award for his novel The Tsaddik of the Seven Wonders.

== Biographic data ==
Haiblum was born in Brooklyn, New York City on May 23, 1935. He died in New York City on October 25, 2012, of a stroke.

== Novels ==
=== Siscoe and Block ===
- The Identity Plunderers (1984, ISBN 0-451-12826-5)
- The Hand of Ganz (1985, ISBN 0-451-13341-2)

=== Weiss and Weiss ===
- New York Confidential (2005, ISBN 0-425-20360-3)
- Murder In Gotham (2008, ISBN 0-425-21907-0)

=== Other novels ===
- The Tsaddik of the Seven Wonders (1971, ISBN 0-385-17137-4)
- The Return (1973) (440-07395-095—Note: This number was taken from the spine of a Dell First Printing---February 1973 Edition, which has no barcode, i.e., no ISBN on its cover.)
- Transfer to Yesterday (1973, ISBN 0-385-17136-6)
- The Wilk Are Among Us (1975, ISBN 0-440-19817-8)
- Interworld (1977, ISBN 0-440-12285-6)
- Binary Star 3 (1979, ISBN 0-440-10526-9) (with Ron Goulart)
- Nightmare Express (1979, ISBN 0-449-14204-3)
- The Mutants Are Coming (1984, ISBN 0-385-17513-2)
- Murder in Yiddish (1988, ISBN 0-385-17513-2)
- Bad Neighbors (1990, ISBN 0-312-04263-9)
- Out of Sync (1990, ISBN 0-345-35501-6)
- Specterworld (1991, ISBN 0-380-75858-X)
- Crystalworld (1992, ISBN 0-380-75859-8)
