= One for the Morning Glory =

1996 novel by John Barnes

One For the Morning Glory
- Author: John Barnes
- Cover artist: Charles Vess
- Language: English
- Genre: Fantasy
- Publisher: Tor Books
- Publication date: April 1996
- Publication place: USA
- Media type: Print (hardcover & paperback)
- Pages: 319
- ISBN: 0-312-86106-0 (hc)
- OCLC: 33102255
- Dewey Decimal: 813/.54 20
- LC Class: PS3552.A677 O5 1996

One For the Morning Glory is a fantasy novel by John Barnes, published 1996. It is a fairy tale where the characters know that they are in a fairy tale. The novel has a humorous tone similar to William Goldman's The Princess Bride — quite different from Barnes' usual science fiction. It forms the second part of a three book series whose first and third parts are not yet written.

== Plot summary ==
There is a saying in the land that someone who drinks the Wine of the Gods before he is ready is only half a man thereafter. Amatus, the prince, manages to swig down a significant amount of the Wine of the Gods, and his entire left half vanishes. His father, the normally gentle King Boniface, orders the executions of the four people responsible for this travesty—the maid, the alchemist, the witch, and the captain of the guard—and then begins the long and arduous process of interviewing to fill these four positions.

A year and a day later, four strangers arrive in the kingdom. This is a magical time, and noted by all as being very auspicious. The strangers are hired by the king and become known as the prince's Companions.

The rest of the tale deals with Amatus's growth into manhood, kingship, and love. It is filled with adventure, laughter, tragedy, unexpected reunions and royal pomp.

== Vocabulary ==
The novel is written with playful malapropisms: Barnes takes unusual English words and uses them with utterly different meanings. Characters wear swashes, in which they keep their dueling pismires; and meet in small drinking establishments known as taborets and stupors. One character is named Pell Grant. Many of the place names, such as the Isought Gap, are philosophical references.

== Fictional works ==
The story is peppered with references to a number of fictional works, such as the important tomes Highly Unpleasant Things It Is Sometimes Useful to Know and Things It Is Not Good to Know at All.

== Tricycle ==
Barnes has stated that One For the Morning Glory is the second part of a three book series he calls a "tricycle". The first part of the series will be titled The Knight Who.
