= The Bell at Sealey Head =

2008 novel by Patricia A. McKillip

- First edition cover
- Author: Patricia A. McKillip
- Cover artist: Kinuko Y. Craft
- Language: English
- Genre: Fantasy
- Publisher: Ace Books
- Publication date: September 2, 2008
- Publication place: United States
- Media type: Print
- Pages: 288
- ISBN: 0-441-01630-8

The Bell at Sealey Head is a 2008 fantasy novel by American writer Patricia A. McKillip. Released on 2 September 2008 to generally positive critical and commercial reception, it was nominated for the Locus Award for Best Fantasy Novel as well as the Mythopoeic Fantasy Award for Adult Literature in 2009.

As with many of McKillip's titles, the cover painting was drawn by Kinuko Y. Craft.

== Plot summary ==
The small ocean town of Sealey Head has long been haunted by a phantom bell that tolls as evening falls. The sound is so common that many of the town's inhabitants do not even notice it, let alone questions its existence. Ridley Dow, a scholar from the city, comes to investigate the mystery, and sets up residence at the old inn owned by Judd Cauley and his ailing father. To aid Ridley, Judd enlists the help of his friend and love-interest Gwyneth Blair, a merchant's daughter who writes her own stories to explain the bell.

On the other side of town is the ancient manor Aislinn House, whose owner, Lady Eglantyne, lies dying. Emma Wood, a servant in the house, is able to open doors that lead not into another room, but into another world. On the other side of Aislinn House's doors is a castle where the princess Ysabo moves through her daily rituals, tasks that Ysabo hates and does not understand, but is forbidden to question or avoid. While Emma and Ysabo are able to speak to one another, neither has ever tried to cross the threshold into the other's world.

After a great deal of searching, Judd is eventually able to replace the inn's ill-reputed cook Mrs. Quinn with the recently arriving Mr. Pilchard. When Lady Eglantyne's heir Lady Miranda Beryl comes to Aislinn House with an entourage of new faces, including the ambiguous Mr. Moren, new light is shed upon the many secrets of Sealey Head. As the town gets pulled deeper into the strange magic that alternating protagonists Judd, Emma, Gwyneth and Ysabo uncover, Ridley - drawn by the legend of his ancestor of ages old Nemos Moore - is led to breach the border between Aislinn House and Ysabo's world. It is only when the bell's spellcaster is discovered and overcome that all of Sealey Head is freed from its ancient curse.

== Accolades ==
- Nominated — Mythopoeic Fantasy Award for Adult Literature (2009)
- Nominated — Locus Award for Best Fantasy Novel (2009)
