= Alphabet of Thorn =

2004 novel by Patricia A. McKillip

- First edition cover
- Author: Patricia A. McKillip
- Cover artist: Kinuko Y. Craft
- Language: English
- Genre: Fantasy
- Publisher: Ace Books
- Publication date: February 2004
- Publication place: United States
- Media type: Print (hardback & paperback)
- Pages: 314 (first edition, hardback)
- ISBN: 0-441-01130-6 (first edition, hardback)
- OCLC: 53084211
- Dewey Decimal: 813/.54 22
- LC Class: PS3563.C38 A78 2004

Alphabet of Thorn is a 2004 fantasy novel written by American author Patricia A. McKillip. It was nominated for the 2005 Mythopoeic Fantasy Award for Adult Literature.

== Plot summary ==
Nepenthe is a sixteen-year-old orphan who was found and raised by the Royal Librarians of Raine. During the new queen's coronation, visitors and ambassadors from the Twelve Crowns (domains) that comprise Raine gauge Queen Tessera's strength. Bourne of Seale, a junior mage from the Floating School, meets Nepenthe in the library with a book inscribed with an unknown language, which seems to be written in configurations of plant thorns. Instead of delivering it to the Master Librarians, Nepenthe decides to transcribe it herself; she soon becomes obsessed with learning the book's outcome. On the surface, it appears to be an epic poem documenting the conquests of Axis and Kane, an emperor and "the Hooded One", three thousand years earlier.

As Nepenthe continues reading, the ruler of Seale prepares to usurp the throne from Tessera, whom he views as weak. (She is only fourteen years old.) Reading further as Seale's army marches (and Bourne is imprisoned for treason), Nepenthe learns that Axis and Kane traveled through time to expand the reach and strength of Axis' empire. Popular histories in Raine list the man Kane as Axis' court mage; Kane was, but the woman Kane was also his lover who opened the Gates of Time for him. Kane became pregnant with his child, and she traveled with the infant through time to a cliff side near Raine. She wrote a book about her life in the language of thorns and because of her enchantments, no one but her daughter could read it—by the book's climax, she has. The final words of the book open the Gates of Time that admit Axis and Kane, Nepenthe's parents, and their uncountable legions of followers near Raine, three thousand years in their future.

When Queen Tessera learns of the planned invasion, with the help of Vevay, her own mage, and the magicians of the Floating School, she uses magic to make Raine seem a dilapidated ruin and thereby protect it from Axis. Nepenthe meets her mother and refuses Kane's offer to rule Raine, because it would require Nepenthe to turn her back on the only world she's ever known. Kane chooses to remain in Raine, where she can be with her daughter and won't have to hide her identity. This effectively stops Axis' conquests because without her; he can't travel through the Gates of Time. The forces of Seale see Axis's army retreat in fear, which strengthens Tessera's claim on the throne. Kane stays with her daughter, and Nepenthe remains in the Royal Library, the only life she ever wants to know.

== Literary significance and reception ==
The Magill Book Review said in their 2004 review that "Reading Patricia A. McKillip's novels is itself like being drawn into a faraway world thick with magic. The intricate style weaves a tapestry whose extra dimensions reveal themselves only gradually." Publishers Weekly praised the female leads saying "Best of all, the strong female leads neither rail against nor submit to patriarchy. In this magical world blissfully free of bias, people are simply themselves, equally intelligent and witty and thoroughly capable while prone to the occasional error, in a manner that transcends feminism and becomes a celebration of essential humanity."

== See also ==
- 2004 in literature
