= The House on Parchment Street =

1973 novel by Patricia A. McKillip

- Cover of first edition
- Author: Patricia A. McKillip
- Cover artist: Charles Robinson
- Language: English
- Genre: Fantasy
- Publisher: Atheneum
- Publication date: 1973
- Publication place: United States
- Media type: Print (hardcover)
- Pages: 190

The House on Parchment Street is a fantasy ghost story novel for juvenile readers by Patricia A. McKillip, first published in hardcover by Atheneum in 1973 and reprinted in trade paperback by the same publisher in March 1978 and April 1991. It bears the distinction, along with The Throme of the Erril of Sherill (also 1973), of being one of McKillip's first published books.

== Summary ==
Carol, a self-reliant teen-aged American girl, is sent to England to stay a month with relatives currently living in a big old rented house on Parchment Street, next to a graveyard in a small village. Her first encounter with the locals involves a group of delinquent bullies, whom she drives away, only to learn they're the cronies of her cousin Bruce. Naturally, she and Bruce don't immediately hit it off well with each other.

After various misadventures she witnesses a signal event in the cellar—the ghost of a swordsman dressed in black, who disappears into a wall. After she learns Bruce has also seen the ghost, the two enter a tentative alliance to investigate the mystery. The first ghost and another, this one of a young girl, are trapped in a daily reenactment of traumatic events that originally took place during the English Civil War, over three hundred years before. Only the children seem able to perceive the ghosts; neither Carol's hidebound Uncle Harold nor the more open-minded Father Malory can see them.

Eventually Carol and Bruce uncover a walled-up tunnel leading from the cellar of the house to the nearby church, following the ghosts to the bloody conclusion of their reenactments, and are able to lay them to rest by burying their bones, which they discover in the tunnel. In the course of their adventure they develop a more sympathetic relationship.

== Reception ==
Kirkus Reviews calls the book a "satisfying adventure ... just what young readers would order if they had the imagination to dream it up themselves," and goes on to say that "[t]hough the story lacks the intriguing psychological ambiguity of, say, Zilpha Snyder's ghost stories, McKillip blends history, supernatural occurrences, and firm contemporary reality with a sure sense of drama and detail that brings all three worlds to simultaneous life."
