= The Tower at Stony Wood =

Fantasy novel by Patricia A. McKillip

- First edition cover
- Author: Patricia A. McKillip
- Cover artist: Kinuko Y. Craft
- Language: English
- Genre: Fantasy
- Publisher: Ace Books
- Publication date: May 1, 2000
- Publication place: United States
- Media type: Print
- Pages: 304
- ISBN: 0-441-00733-3

The Tower at Stony Wood is a 2000 fantasy novel by American writer Patricia A. McKillip. It was a 2001 Nebula Award nominee.

== Plot summary ==
At the wedding of King Regis Aurum of Yves to Lady Gwynne, knight Cyan Dag of Gloinmere learns a terrible secret: his king is marrying an imposter, and the real Lady Gwynne is imprisoned within a tower in the magical land of Skye. As Cyan Dag begins his quest to free her, Thayne Ysse, the son of the defeated king of Ysse, sets of on his own search. To rebuild Ysse's army, Thayne searches for a tower of gold guarded by a dragon. In a third tower near the village of Stony Wood oblivious to her family's concern, Melanthos watches and embroiders a woman ensconced in her own tower. Cyan, Thayne, and Melanthos lives entangle and weave together, and it is only through helping each other that they are able to free themselves.

== Nominations ==
- 2001 Nebula Award nominee

== See also ==
- Bard
- The Lady of Shalott
- Selkie
- Weaving (mythology)
