= In the Forests of Serre =

2003 novel by Patricia A. McKillip

- First edition cover
- Author: Patricia A. McKillip
- Cover artist: Kinuko Y. Craft
- Language: English
- Genre: Fantasy
- Publisher: Ace Books
- Publication date: June 3, 2003
- Publication place: United States
- Media type: Print
- Pages: 304
- ISBN: 0-441-01011-3
- Dewey Decimal: 813/.54 21
- LC Class: PS3563.C38 I5 2003

In the Forests of Serre is a 2003 fantasy novel by American writer Patricia A. McKillip. It was nominated for the 2004 Mythopoeic Fantasy Award for Adult Literature.

== Summary ==
After the death of his wife and child, Prince Ronan falls into a depression so deep that even a fated encounter with the witch Brume leaves him unmoved. He gives Brume his heart, certain that he no longer needs whatever is left of it, and then wanders through the forests of his country, escaping from an arranged marriage that his parents hope to force him into. In the woods he becomes enchanted by a firebird and relentlessly pursues it, leaving behind his memories in his madness.

As her betrothed runs wildly through the wilderness, Princess Sidonie reluctantly leaves her home of Dacia to travel Serre. Her father and his wizard Unciel realize that an alliance between Dacia and Serre will protect their country from war. To aid Sidonie and guard her from Serre's magic, Unciel arranges another wizard, Gyre, to escort her while Unciel, who is still weak from an earlier battle, and his scribe Euan Ash watch over the events from Dacia. Gyre agrees, but has his own motivation for undertaking the journey. Sidonie encounters the nearly delirious Ronan, though neither know who the other is; Gyre, aware of the prince's quest, takes advantage of the confused situation to steal Ronan's identity.

With the help of Unciel, who gathers his strength to settle the unfinished business he has with Gyre, Sidonie brings Ronan back from his wanderings and brings peace to both Serre and Dacia.

== Nominations ==
- 2004 Mythopoeic Fantasy Award for Adult Literature Finalist

== See also ==
- Firebird
- Baba Yaga
