= The Throme of the Erril of Sherill =

1973 novella by Patricia A. McKillip

- Cover of first edition
- Author: Patricia A. McKillip
- Illustrator: Julia Noonan
- Cover artist: Julia Noonan
- Language: English
- Genre: Fantasy
- Publisher: Atheneum
- Publication date: 1973
- Publication place: United States
- Media type: Print (hardcover)
- Pages: 68
- ISBN: 978-0-689-30115-5
- OCLC: 749998

The Throme of the Erril of Sherill is a fantasy novella for juvenile readers by Patricia A. McKillip, as well as a subsequent collection containing the novella. The novella was first published in hardcover by Atheneum in 1973. It bears the distinction, along with The House on Parchment Street (also 1973), of being one of McKillip's first published books. The novella was later gathered together with the author's short story "The Harrowing of the Dragon of Hoarsbreath" into a paperback collection, also titled The Throme of the Erril of Sherill, issued by Tempo Books in January 1984. The collection was reprinted in February of the same year.

== Summary ==
Magnus Thrall, King of Everywhere, welters away in misery, pining for the nonexistent Throme, supposedly written by the Erril of Sherill ages past in another world. In his suffering he will not allow anyone around him to know happiness, including his weeping daughter Damsen, who yearns for the world outside the castle, and his loyal Chief Cnite Caerles, who seeks Damsen's hand. The king refuses to allow the match unless Caerles finds him the Throme.

In an atypical quest, the Cnite goes seeking what the king demands. With small hope of success, he seeks it in various strange places, only to be misdirected and receive confusing advice as he in turn gradually loses his sword, shield and armor. He borrows a dagon from a girl named Elfwyth, falls victim to a boy's borebel trap, and is cautioned against the cold-hearted Lady Gringold by a jingler in a norange orchard. He visits the Mirk-Well of Morg, the Floral Wold, the Dolorous House of the dead Dolerman, and, in the end, the Western Wellsprings, repository of the answer to Everything.

Ultimately, he solves his dilemma in an imaginative way by writing his own Throme from "the tales and dreams and happenings of his quest."

== The Harrowing of the Dragon of Hoarsbreath ==
Paired with the title story in the 1984 publication, this tale involves more menace and higher stakes. Hoarsbreath is cold, mountainous country that feels the sun only two months of the year, but the dwarves who live in its deep caverns are content. Their peace is disturbed by Ryd, a dwarf returning from the outside world with unsettling news. Homebody Peka has the sense he could represent trouble, success, or maybe both. A dragon and locally brewed alcohol figure into the plot.

== Reception ==
Kirkus Reviews noted that "McKillip's enchantment with words is matched by some felicity and Noonan's pictures echo the mood of delicate fantasy, but the author has not escaped the Peril of Preciosity in her quest for the quintessence of a genre." The author, "it seems, has not decided whether to spoof traditional romance or to emulate [James Thurber's] The Thirteen Clocks in this fanciful distillation about a questing Cnite."

Publishers Weekly called the book "[a] treat for the imaginative child, the reader who appreciates genuine fantasy and an inventive use of words."

Brian Stableford also assessed The Throme of the Erril of Sherill, as "comic fantasy in the manner of James Thurber."
