= The Book of Atrix Wolfe =

1995 novel by Patricia A. McKillip

- First edition cover
- Author: Patricia A. McKillip
- Cover artist: Kinuko Y. Craft
- Language: English
- Genre: Fantasy
- Publisher: Ace Books
- Publication date: July 1, 1995
- Publication place: United States
- Media type: Print
- Pages: 252
- ISBN: 0-441-00211-0
- OCLC: 31045256
- Dewey Decimal: 813/.54 20
- LC Class: PS3563.C38 B66 1995

The Book of Atrix Wolfe is a fantasy novel written by American author Patricia A. McKillip, published in 1995. It was a finalist for the 1996 Mythopoeic Fantasy Award for Adult Literature.

== Summary ==
For twenty years, Atrix Wolfe has turned his back on his magic to live with the wolves in the mountains. A powerful mage, twenty years ago Atrix Wolfe turned the King of the Wood into a terrible Hunter in order to force the invading Kardeth army, which threatened the kingdoms of Pelucir and Chaumenard, to retreat. The Hunter massacred not only the invaders, but the Pelucir forces as well, including the king. During the creation of the Hunter, the daughter of the King and Queen of the Wood, Saro (pronounced the same as "sorrow", a term which is a recurring motif of the book), disappeared.

Talis, the prince of Pelucir, is attending mage's school at Chaumenard when he discovers a book by an unknown author. Though it is only a beginner's spellbook, he is strangely fascinated by it and takes it with him when his brother Burne, the king, summons him back to Pelucir. Experimenting with the book, he discovers that none of the spells do what they say, and are actually codes for more dangerous spells. He takes his studies with the book into the keep which the Kardeth army besieged in the incident 20 years before, and which has been haunted and abandoned ever since. In the kitchens of the castle, a scullery maid named Saro is mute, and thus interacts more with the pots and pans than other people. She is tasked with bringing Talis's meals to the keep, since her lack of knowledge of the world outside the kitchen makes her the only one not afraid of the keep's ghosts. When he meets Saro, he notices that her facial features seem to constantly shift, preventing her from being recognized. This is the first time Saro has had someone actually look at her, rather than seeing her only for her occupation.

Warned by a dream, Atrix Wolfe attempts to retrieve a spellbook he wrote shortly after the incident 20 years ago, but finds it has moved from where he hid it. He discovers Talis took it back to Pelucir, and arrives at the keep just in time to save Talis from the Hunter. While Talis is fleeing from the Hunter, the Queen of the Wood takes him into the magical world of the wood. She says she will only allow him to return to the human world if he brings her Atrix Wolfe, who she needs to find Saro. She cannot get Atrix herself because neither he nor she can pass through the barrier between the human world and the world of the wood. Talis brings her Atrix Wolfe, who agrees to find Saro, and the Queen returns Talis to his world.

Having become enamored of the Queen of the Wood, Talis resolves to find Saro for her before Atrix Wolfe. Though Talis has never been properly introduced to her, he intuits that the scullery maid is Saro, her muteness and ever-changing face being a spell which has kept the Queen from finding her. He brings her to the Queen. The Hunter finds them all there and shoots an arrow into Talis. The threat to his life ignites Saro into breaking the spell upon herself, remembering who she is and crying out to her father, ending her muteness. This in turn bring Ilyos back to himself.

Ilyos, however, has been through so much that he cannot return to his life as the Queen's consort. In order to protect the Queen's world, he has Atrix Wolfe turn him into one of the trees of the Wood. As partial penance for having caused the death of Burne and Talis's father, Atrix Wolfe remains in Pelucir to tutor Talis in magic. Talis is surprised when Saro returns to Pelucir, and they begin to become acquainted. She says that she no longer felt at home in the world of the Wood, and that he is the only one who can understand her, being the only other person to have spent time in both worlds.

== Nominations ==
- 1996 Mythopoeic Fantasy Award for Adult Literature

== See also ==
- Wild hunt
