= Yonder =

Yonder may refer to:

== Arts and entertainment ==
- Yonder (collection), a 1958 collection of short stories by Charles Beaumont
- Tin Star Orphans, a Canadian indie rock band previously known as Yonder
- Yonder (EP), a 2023 EP by Dabda
- Yonder: The Cloud Catcher Chronicles, a 2017 video game
- Yonder (TV series), a 2022 South Korean television series
- Yonder, a young readers imprint of Restless Books

== Businesses ==
- Yonder (company), an American disinformation research and services company
- Yonder (restaurant), a former restaurant in Portland, Oregon, United States

== People ==
- Yonder Alonso (born 1987), Cuban professional baseball player
- Yonder García (born 1993), Cuban volleyball player
- Yonder Godoy (born 1993), Venezuelan racing cyclist
- Yonder Silva (born 1997), Venezuelan footballer

== See also ==
- Yonder Bognie, stone circle in Aberdeenshire, Scotland
- Yondertown, a mining hamlet
- Yondering, a 1980 collection of short stories by Louis L'Amour
- Yonderboi (born 1980), Hungarian composer, music producer and visual artist
- Yondr an American company
- Deixis
