= The Bards of Bone Plain =

2010 novel by Patricia A. McKillip

- Cover of first edition
- Author: Patricia A. McKillip
- Cover artist: Kinuko Y. Craft
- Language: English
- Genre: Fantasy
- Publisher: Ace Books
- Publication date: 2010
- Publication place: United States
- Media type: Print (hardcover), ebook
- Pages: 329
- ISBN: 978-0-441-01957-1
- OCLC: 555647662

The Bards of Bone Plain is a fantasy novel by Patricia A. McKillip. It was first published in hardcover and ebook by Ace Books in December 2010, with a book club edition issued simultaneously with the Science Fiction Book Club and a trade paperback edition following December 2011. The first British edition was published in ebook by Gateway/Orion in December 2015.

== Summary ==
The book is set in a culture reminiscent of the medieval era, but technologically near-modern, and in which archaeology is also an established profession. Scholar Phelan Cle of the Bardic School at Caerau chooses as his graduate thesis the subject of the perhaps mythical Bone Plain, where all poetry is said to have originated, and the tale of the wandering bard Nairn.

Meanwhile, archaeologist Jonah Cle, Phelan's alcoholic father, pursues his own investigations, urged on by his dedicated disciple Princess Beatrice, the king's youngest daughter. At the standing stones near the school is unearthed a strange artifact, a disk marked with ancient runes that may prove key to the mysteries of Bone Plain. Beatrice soon discovers indications of the lost language it represents everywhere.

Alternating chapters recount the activities of the Cles and the princess and the legend of Nairn, and gradually the present and past are revealed to mirror each other and ultimately fuse.

== Reception ==
In a starred review, Publishers Weekly calls the novel "a rich, resonant story of poetry, riddles, mystery, and magic. ... McKillip seduces readers with lyrical prose; intriguing, complex characters; and resonant riddles-within-riddles."

Jackie Cassada in Library Journal also gives the book a starred review, decreeing it a "masterfully told tale by an author sensitive to nuance and detail [that] will please McKillip's many fans," writing that her "finely tuned feel for the mythic aspects of stories informs her fantasies with the underpinnings of archetypal power, yet her characters remain endearingly human, with recognizable flaws and strengths."

Rebecca Gerber in Booklist writes that "[r]eaders already familiar with the author will enjoy a fascinating tale of music and bards, legends and reality, and, most of all—magic. For those exposed to McKillip for the first time, a treasure awaits them in the pages of this story. ... Almost (Thomas) Hardy-ish in the level of description, the author never loses the reader in description for description’s sake. Each element described serves to further the story."

The collection was also reviewed by Paul Di Filippo in Barnes & Noble Review, 2010, and Faren Miller in Locus no. 600, January 2016.

== Awards ==
The novel was nominated for the 2011 Endeavour Award for Distinguished Novel or Collection and the 2011 Mythopoeic Fantasy Award for Adult Literature, and placed sixth in the 2011 Locus Poll Award for Best Fantasy Novel.
