= Song for the Basilisk =

1998 book by Patricia A. McKillip

- First edition cover
- Author: Patricia A. McKillip
- Cover artist: Kinuko Y. Craft
- Language: English
- Genre: Fantasy
- Publisher: Ace Books
- Publication date: September 1, 1998
- Publication place: United States
- Media type: Print
- Pages: 314
- ISBN: 0-441-00447-4
- OCLC: 987642215

Song for the Basilisk is a 1998 fantasy novel by American writer Patricia A. McKillip. It was a Mythopoeic Fantasy Award for Adult Literature finalist in 1999.

== Summary ==
The sole survivor of a massacre, Caladrius, nicknamed Rook, has been living with the bards of Luly since the day he was rescued from the smoldering remains of his home. Despite falling in love and having a son, Caladrius is unable to make peace with his memories, and so ventures into the world to discover how his family was destroyed – and why. He learns his true name: he is Griffin Tormalyne from the house of Griffin, which was crushed by Arioso Pellior, the patriarch of the house of Basilisk and tyrant of the city of Berylon.

In Berylon, Caladrius enters Pellior's house as a music teacher for Pellior's decidedly un-musical daughter. As Griffin tutors Damiet Pellior for an upcoming opera, the city's musicians hatch their own plots. Armed with his picochet, a single-stringed instrument played by peasants, and a small bone pipe, Griffin challenges the Basilisk and exacts his revenge. But his revenge is not complete. Arioso Pellior is stricken, but not dead. Pellior names his other daughter, Luna, a powerful magician who has been his apprentice all her life, as his heir. Unexpectedly, Luna declares that thirty-seven years of torturing Tourmalyne House are enough. Hearing this, her father dies of anger. Luna begins to help Caladrius restore Tormalyne House.

== Nominations ==
- 1999 Mythopoeic Fantasy Award for Adult Literature Finalist

== See also ==
- Basilisk
- Griffin
