= Ombria in Shadow =

Book by Patricia A. McKillip

- First edition cover of Ombria in Shadow
- Author: Patricia A. McKillip
- Cover artist: Kinuko Y. Craft
- Language: English
- Genre: Fantasy
- Publisher: Ace Books
- Publication date: January 8, 2002
- Publication place: United States
- Media type: Print (hardcover)
- Pages: 304
- ISBN: 0-441-00895-X
- OCLC: 47716469
- Dewey Decimal: 813/.54 21
- LC Class: PS3563.C38 O43 2002

Ombria in Shadow is a fantasy novel by American writer Patricia A. McKillip, first published by Ace Books in 2002. It won the 2003 World Fantasy Award and Mythopoeic Award. The book centres on the activities of several characters who inhabit a shadowy city beset by intrigue and entropy.

== Plot summary ==
In the beginning of Ombria in Shadow, Royce Greve, ruler of Ombria, has just died and his mistress Lydea is being thrown out of the castle by the ancient, evil, and powerful Domina Pearl who wishes to gain control over the court by acting as regent for Royce's young son Kyel. Lydea flees through the dangerous night-time streets and eventually, with some aid from a mysterious source, reaches the tavern of her father. Meanwhile, beneath Ombria, Faey, a sorceress who can wear any face she likes, and her assistant Mag, who helped Lydea survive her flight from the castle, work on magical potions and charms for the wealthy of the city, including Domina Pearl.

In the castle Ducon Greve, Royce's bastard nephew, tries to support Kyel against the machinations of Domina Pearl in an increasingly paranoid climate. Various nobles, unhappy with Domina's ruthless rule, attempt to convince him to work against her and set himself up as the new prince of Ombria. Unwilling to go down such a dangerous route and concerned that it could have dire consequences for Kyel, Ducon manages to foist them off, escaping through the vast network of secret passageways and rooms that permeate the castle.

Faey is hired by one of Ducon's enemies to kill him; she makes a magical piece of charcoal that is imbued with poison. Mag, who has been observing Ducon, does not want him to die and searches for a way to undo the spell. However, she becomes trapped in the castle, eventually freed by the historian Camas Erl on the promise that she will bring him to meet Faey, who has been alive for ages, and whose history is entwined with the city's.

Ducon uses the charcoal to sketch a man who looks just like him, who seems to come to life. Pursuing him, but delirious from the poison, he inadvertently falls into Faey's lair. Lydea, there to seek Faey's help, insists that Faey cure him. With Ducon and Faey's help, Lydea is able to return to the castle where she works as Kyel's tutor alongside Camas Erl, who is obsessed with discovering the secret to Ombria's shadowy underworld. After being introduced to Faey, Camas wanders the underworld, trying to find out about the Shadow City and how Ombria has been changed in the past by its manifestation.

Mag is given a pendant by Faey, which had been left with her as a baby on Faey's doorstep. Using the small piece of charcoal that she finds inside, Mag begins to draw random shapes. The drawings are able to destroy various parts of Domina's body. Domina, enraged by what she considers Faey's betrayal, captures Ducon and Lydea along with Mag, bringing them to the secret room where she keeps her regenerative bed, the reason that she has lived so long. Faey leaves the underworld, and the stirrings of the incredibly powerful sorceress are the trigger for the manifestation of the Shadow City. While Ducon fights Domina, Lydea escapes with Kyel by running through a rift into the Shadow City shown to her by the same mysterious man seen earlier by Ducon. Ducon kills Domina, and then meets the man who looks like him - His father. From Ombria's reflection, years ago he fell in love with Royce's sister, and tarried with her long enough to get her with child. The shadow transition eventually finishes, and Ombria has changed. No one has memories of the previous Ombria but for Faey and Mag. Ducon is now Prince and Lydea his love, Kyel is his heir and Mag is Kyel's tutor. All is happy.

== Major themes ==
The novel addresses the idea of boundary transgression. According to critic Stefan Ekman, this comes out through how the city is structured in concentric zones around the shadowy portal at the centre of the palace. Ekman observes how these boundaries are marked by portrayals of nature. The book also upends typical fantasy tropes like the good/evil duality.
