= The Forgotten Beasts of Eld =

1974 novel by Patricia A. McKillip

- Dust-jacket from the first edition
- Author: Patricia A. McKillip
- Illustrator: Peter Schaumann (1974); Alicia Austin (1981)
- Cover artist: Peter Schaumann (1974); Alicia Austin (1981)
- Language: English
- Genre: Fantasy, Young Adult
- Publisher: Atheneum Books
- Publication date: 1974
- Publication place: United States
- Media type: Print (hardcover)
- Pages: 217
- ISBN: 0-689-30434-X
- OCLC: 901247
- LC Class: PZ7.M19864 Fo

The Forgotten Beasts of Eld is a fantasy novel by American writer Patricia A. McKillip, and illustrators Peter Schaumann in 1974, and Alicia Austin in 1981, first published by Atheneum Publishers in 1974, and by Magic Carpet Books in 1996. It is the winner of the 1975 World Fantasy Award for Best Novel. The book centers on Sybel, a woman previously cut off from the rest of the world of Eldwold, as she learns to live and love in the world outside of the one she once knew.

== Plot summary ==
Sixteen-year-old Sybel lives alone on a mountain, with only the mythical creatures that her deceased father Ogam summoned for company. Sybel cares for the creatures and shares a type of telepathy with them. However, in the dead of night, a man named Coren of Sirle gives her a baby to care for. Coren believes the baby is none other than the child of Sybel's niece Rianna, the now deceased queen of Eld, and her dead lover, Norrel, although it is later revealed that he is the son of Rianna and Drede, king of Eldwold. Sybel accepts the baby, Tamlorn, on Coren's conditions that she love it, and cares for Tamlorn with the help of the witch Maelga who lives near the mountain.

Twelve years later, Coren comes back for Tamlorn. Sybel refuses to return him, believing that Coren and his brothers would use Tamlorn in their plot against Drede, the king of Eld. She later reluctantly gives Tamlorn to Drede along with the mythical falcon Ter, to watch over Tamlorn. As a result Sybel falls into a depression and resumes her quest to summon the Liralen, a legendary white bird. Instead, she not only finds the Blammor, a creature of shadow that induces fear, but the wizard Mithran who has been paid by Drede to destroy Sybel's will and hand her over to him. However, Mithran desires Sybel and Sybel manages to escape by summoning the Blammor who crushes every bone in Mithran's body to splinters.

Upon returning to her home, where Coren is recovering from his injuries caused by one of the creatures in Sybel's care, Sybel induces Coren to marry her, knowing he loves her and she can use him and his love as a tool for revenge against Drede. They journey to Coren's home and get married. Later, Sybel and Coren transport the mythical beasts and Sybel's books to Coren's home.

Sybel plans to start a war between Coren's people in Sirle, who oppose Drede, and Drede. Coren discovers this and is upset with Sybel. The Blammor, whom Sybel held on condition of her fearlessness, comes to Sybel in the night, and she sees in her mind, the Liralen with its neck broken. Sybel flees to the now deserted Eld Mountain and sets all the creatures free. They choose to lure Drede and his army, and the Sirle lords and their army, away from each other, thus defusing the war (although it is unknown at the end of the book whether the lords and armies will return, other than Coren). Tamlorn wakes Sybel up and tells her that Drede had died, that he thinks that whatever killed the wizard Mithran also killed Drede, and he is now king of Eldwold. They go to Maelga's house and, at the advice of Maelga, Sybel spends her time recovering instead of dwelling on her misdeeds. When she has recovered enough to start calling, she again calls for the Liralen but finds Coren at her gate instead. They talk and Coren asks her why he should return to her. She tells him he is the only person who can bring her joy, and they reunite. On a hunch, Sybel summons the Blammor which reveals itself to be the Liralen. Sybel asks the Liralen to take her and Coren home.

== Characters ==
Sybel – Sixteen at the beginning of the story, she raises Tamlorn with the help of Maelga, the witch. She is the daughter of Ogam. She does not display her emotions and desires knowledge. Throughout the book, she seeks the Liralen, a mysterious white bird. She later marries Coren. Described by McKillip as having long "ivory" hair and her father's black eyes, and very pale skin. Coren often refers to her as "Ice-white lady".

Ogam – Sybel's father and summoner of Gules Lyon, Ter, and Moriah.

Myk – Ogam's father and the one who started the practice of summoning the mythical beasts of Eld.

Coren of Sirle – The man who brings the baby Tamlorn for Sybel to raise. He later falls in love with her. He is described as having red hair, which is characteristic of his family, and possesses an uncanny and intuitive knowledge of Sybel's legendary beasts.

Tamlorn – Son of Rianna, the deceased queen of Eld, and of King Drede. Given to Sybel to raise when he was only a baby. Twelve years later in the book, he becomes king of Eld.

Maelga – The witch who lives near Sybel. Helps Sybel to raise Tamlorn in exchange for onions. She is described as being "a thin old woman" with untidy, curly white hair and iron grey eyes.

Drede – King of Eldwold.

Mithran – A treacherous wizard who attempts to rape Sybel and is killed by the Blammor. Though his name is clearly taken from Mithrandir, the Elvish name for J.R.R. Tolkien's benevolent wizard Gandalf, Mithran is anything but honorable or good.

=== Beasts of Eld ===
Black Swan of Tirlith – One of the creatures that Sybel cares for. The author describes it as being a "great winged" and "golden eyed" swan. Summoned by Myk, the father of Ogam.

Blammor – A mysterious creature that is the incarnation of "the fear men die of." It is described as being a black mist with five eyes. Summoned by Sybel. It proves eventually to be the other, darker aspect of the Liralen, the great bird Sybel is trying to capture.

Cyrin – One of the creatures that Sybel cares for. He is a boar who "knows all the riddles save one". He is described as being very wise, and having red eyes and white tusks. Also summoned by Myk. Cyrin can speak, and, early in the book, warns Coren about what a desire for vengeance on Drede can do to him, with this cautionary tale: "The giant Grof was hit in one eye by a stone, and that eye turned inward so that it looked into his mind, and he died of what he saw there." Cyrin later tells Sybel the same thing, for a similar reason, but, in her case, it has no apparent immediate effect.

Gules Lyon – One of the creatures that Sybel cares for. A Lyon (lion) who "lived in the courts of great lords, dispensing wisdom, fed on rich meats, wearing their collars and chains of iron and gold only as long as he chose...". Before being summoned by Ogam, he lived in the Southern deserts of Eld.

Gyld – One of the creatures that Sybel cares for. He is a dragon with green wings and a love for treasure. Originally summoned by Myk, later in the book, he is released by Sybel.

Moriah – Described as being a huge black cat who has a wide knowledge of spells and charms, green eyes, a "sweet silken voice", and "teeth like honed polished stones". One of the creatures that Sybel cares for. Called the "Lady of the Night" by Coren.

Ter – A falcon legendary for tearing to pieces the seven murderers of his previous master. Summoned by Ogam. Goes to Drede's court with Tam.

== Literary significance and reception ==
The Forgotten Beasts of Eld has been reviewed by Locus as "a mythical kingdom fantasy with a marvelous heroine, satisfying strange beasts and chilling sorcery". Publishers Weekly wrote "this magical moonlight fantasy has dignity and romance, heartstopping suspense, adventure, richness of concept and language." Lester del Rey praised the novel as "a true fairy tale in its telling and its development," citing the "marvelous subtlety" of McKillip's storytelling and her "inevitable but unexpected" resolution of the story.

The Forgotten Beasts of Eld has been cited as one of the "outstanding examples" of high fantasy novels written for young people in the 1970s.

The Forgotten Beasts of Eld is the winner of the 1975 World Fantasy Award. It was a nominee for the 1975 Mythopoeic Fantasy Award and won the 13th place in the 1975 Locus Poll Award for Best Novel.

The Forgotten Beasts of Eld has been referenced in Fantastic Literature: A Critical Reader as "we can accept the final transformation of the hideous monster Blammor into the beautiful Liralen bird without necessarily agreeing with the identity of creative and destructive passions that such a metaphor implies."
