= Patricia A. McKillip =

American fantasy and science fiction author (1948–2022)

Patricia Anne McKillip
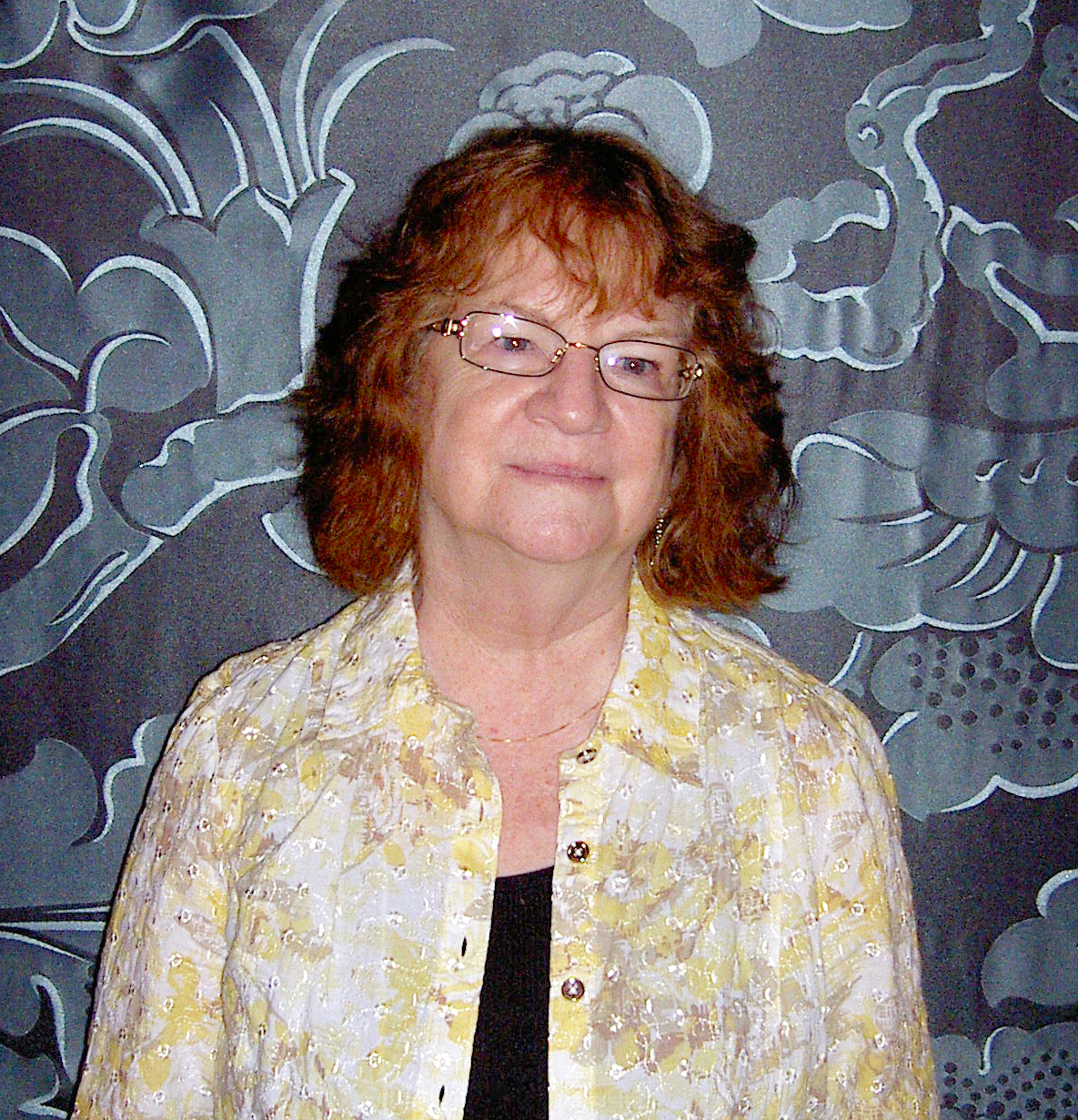
- McKillip in 2011
- Born: February 29, 1948 Salem, Oregon, U.S.
- Died: May 6, 2022 (aged 74) Coos Bay, Oregon, U.S.
- Occupation: Novelist
- Education: San Jose State University (BA, MA)
- Genre: Fantasy
- Notable awards: Mythopoeic Awards 1995; World Fantasy Award 1975 and 2003; World Fantasy Award for Life Achievement 2008
- Spouse: David Lunde

Patricia Anne McKillip (February 29, 1948 – May 6, 2022) was an American author of fantasy and science fiction. She wrote predominantly standalone fantasy novels and has been called "one of the most accomplished prose stylists in the fantasy genre". Her work won many awards, including the World Fantasy Award for Lifetime Achievement in 2008.

== Personal life ==
McKillip was born in Salem, Oregon to Wayne and Helen (née Roth) McKillip. She grew up in Oregon, Great Britain, and Germany. She attended the College of Notre Dame (Belmont, California) and San Jose State University (San Jose, California), where she earned her BA and MA degrees in English in the early 1970s.

McKillip was married to David Lunde, a poet. She died on May 6, 2022, at the age of 74 at her home in Coos Bay, Oregon.

== Career ==
McKillip's first publications were two short children's books, The Throme of the Erril of Sherill and The House on Parchment Street. Her first novel, The Forgotten Beasts of Eld, was published in 1974, when she was 26 years old, and won the World Fantasy Award in 1975. She next wrote the Riddle-Master trilogy (1976–1979), which scholar Peter Nicholls described as "a work of classic stature". It was selected as part of Gollancz's Fantasy Masterworks series.

Since 1994, McKillip's writing comprised mostly standalone novels. Most of her novels feature cover paintings by Kinuko Y. Craft. On writing fantasy, she said, "The tropes of mythology and symbolism are the basics. It's like a notation in music; you can change it in really wacky ways, but the sound is always the same, the sound is always there. As long as we need these symbols, then the stories will be written. But if we destroy the old symbols, then we might just have to come up with new ones—who knows?" Critic Brian Stableford described McKillip as "one of the most accomplished prose stylists in the fantasy genre", while Nicholls and John Clute considered her "perhaps the most impressive author of fantasy story still active".

McKillip was the Guest of Honor at the 1985 Mythcon and the 1999 World Fantasy Convention, and in 2005 the Journal of the Fantastic in the Arts published a special issue on her work. She received the World Fantasy Award for Life Achievement in 2008.

== Awards ==
McKillip holds the record for the most Mythopoeic Fantasy Awards (four) and nominations (fifteen). She has also won World Fantasy Awards for Best Novel, as well as for Life Achievement.

Awards and nominations
Award	Work	Result
Hugo Award	Harpist in the Wind (1979)	Nominated
Locus Award	Harpist in the Wind (1979)	Won
Locus Award	The Bell at Sealey Head (2008)	Nominated
Mythopoeic Award	The Forgotten Beasts of Eld (1974)	Nominated
Mythopoeic Award	The Changeling Sea (1988)	Nominated
Mythopoeic Award	The Sorceress and the Cygnet (1991)	Nominated
Mythopoeic Award	The Cygnet and the Firebird (1993)	Nominated
Mythopoeic Award	Something Rich and Strange (1994)	Won
Mythopoeic Award	The Book of Atrix Wolfe (1995)	Nominated
Mythopoeic Award	Winter Rose (1996)	Nominated
Mythopoeic Award	Song for the Basilisk (1998)	Nominated
Mythopoeic Award	Ombria in Shadow (2002)	Won
Mythopoeic Award	In the Forests of Serre (2003)	Nominated
Mythopoeic Award	Alphabet of Thorn (2004)	Nominated
Mythopoeic Award	Solstice Wood (2006)	Won
Mythopoeic Award	The Bell at Sealey Head (2008)	Nominated
Mythopoeic Award	The Bards of Bone Plain (2010)	Nominated
Mythopoeic Award	Kingfisher (2016)	Won
Nebula Award	Winter Rose (1996)	Nominated
Nebula Award	The Tower at Stony Wood (2000)	Nominated
World Fantasy Award	The Forgotten Beasts of Eld (1974)	Won
World Fantasy Award	Harpist in the Wind (1979)	Nominated
World Fantasy Award	Ombria in Shadow (2002)	Won
World Fantasy Award	Od Magic (2005)	Nominated
