= Britannica's Tales Around the World =

US television program

- Genre: Children's; Educational
- Created by: Britannica Video
- Directed by: David Alexovich
- Presented by: Pat Morita
- Composer: George Daugherty
- Country of origin: United States
- Original language: English

Production
- Executive producer: Phil Stockton
- Production company: Encyclopædia Britannica Films

Original release
- Release: 1990 – 1990

Britannica's Tales Around the World (also referred to as Britannica's Fairy Tales from Around the World and Familiar Tales Around the World) is a direct-to-video animated educational series that was released in 1990.

== Premise ==
Britannica's Tales Around the World, written by Douglas Lieberman, teaches kids a familiar fairy tale from around the world, followed by two lesser-known stories that share a similar theme. The series opens up in a computer-generated landscape, containing a floating castle and the planet Earth in the background. Pat Morita would explain the significance of each of the three stories and then the camera zooms to a country on Earth where the fairy tale was traditionally told.

== List of videos ==
Title
"Beauty and the Beast/The Chinese Parrot/Sedna"

Beauty and the Beast (France): The beast is massive, powerful, and ugly to behold, yet only the love of a young girl can save him.

The Chinese Parrot (China): A magical parrot must save the love between a scholar and the servingmaid of an evil sorcerer.

Sedna (Canada): A mighty bird spirit disguises itself as a young hunter to win the heart of a lovely Inuk girl.
"Cinderella/Maria Cinderella/The Maiden, The Frog and The Chief's Son"

Cinderella (France): Her stepsisters will never make fun of Cinderella again, thanks to help from a fairy godmother.

Maria Cinderella (Chile): Maria gets a magic wand and more from a kind lady in the woods - a gold star for her forehead.

The Maiden, the Frog, and the Chief's Son (Nigeria): When a mistreated girl feeds the frogs in the river, the "King of the Frogs" decide to reward her.
"Hansel and Gretel/The Woodcutter's Wealthy Sister/Pedro and the Monster"

Hansel and Gretel (Germany):

The Woodcutter's Wealthy Sister (Syria): A poor and mean-spirited woodcutter encounters a mysterious and wealthy woman claiming to be his sister. She lures him and his wife and ten children to her palace, only for his wife to discover that the "sister" is a demonic monster planning to eat the woodcutter's entire family. But the woodcutter refuses to believe her.

Pedro and the Monster (Philippines):
"Sleeping Beauty/The Petrified Palace/Sun, Moon, and Talia"

Sleeping Beauty (France):

The Petrified Palace (Bangladesh):

Sun, Moon, and Talia (Italy):
"Rapunzel/Fenchelchen/The Princess in the Tower"

Rapunzel (Germany): The only way into the tower is up Rapunzel's long, long hair. A prince climbs up to meet her.

Fenchelchen (Malta): A young girl learns a witch's magical power and uses it to make an unforgettable escape.

The Princess in the Tower (Israel): King Solomon locks his daughter in a tower to prevent her from marrying a poor man.
"Rumpelstiltskin/St. Olaf and the Troll/King David and the Giant"

Rumpelstiltskin (Germany):

St. Olaf and the Troll (Norway):

King David and the Giant (Israel):

== Home video ==
=== United States ===
These tapes were released by Kids Klassics and GoodTimes Entertainment.

- Cinderella and Other Tales
- Sleeping Beauty and Other Tales
- Beauty and the Beast and Other Tales
- Rumpelstiltskin and Other Tales
- Hansel and Gretel and Other Tales
- Rapunzel and Other Tales

These DVDs were released by Encyclopædia Britannica on their online store.

- Beauty and the Beast, Sleeping Beauty, and Other Animated Tales
- Cinderella, Rumpelstiltskin, and Other Animated Tales
- Hansel and Gretel, Rapunzel, and Other Animated Tales

A further release titled Aesop's Animated Fables contains animated shorts that were not originally produced as part of this series.

=== United Kingdom ===
These DVDs were released by Pegasus in 2005.

- Beauty and the Beast, Sleeping Beauty, and Other Animated Tales
- Cinderella, Rumpelstiltskin, and Other Animated Tales
- Hansel and Gretel, Rapunzel, and Other Animated Tales (re-released by Brightspark Productions in 2010 under the title "Tangled Up")

A further release titled Aesop's Animated Fables contains animated shorts that were not originally produced as part of this series.

The complete collection was released containing all stories.

== Controversy ==
When Brightspark rereleased episodes of Britannica's Tales Around the World under the title Tangled Up, The Walt Disney Company accused the company for "misleading consumers with numerous releases that confuse and undermine the trust those consumers have in Disney", especially when the re-release contained a similar title and cover artwork to Disney's 2010 film Tangled.
