= Rose Daughter =

1997 retelling of Beauty and the Beast by Robin McKinley

- First edition, 1997
- Author: Robin McKinley
- Language: English
- Series: Folktales
- Genre: Fantasy novel
- Publisher: Greenwillow Books
- Publication date: June 1997
- Publication place: United Kingdom
- Media type: Print (hardcover)
- Pages: 320pp
- ISBN: 0-688-15439-5
- OCLC: 36008522
- Dewey Decimal: 813/.54 21
- LC Class: PZ8.M1793 Ro 1997
- Preceded by: Beauty
- Followed by: Spindle's End

Rose Daughter is the second retelling of the fairy tale Beauty and the Beast by Robin McKinley, published in 1997 by Greenwillow Books, a imprint of HarperCollins Publishers. Rose Daughter has been republished in both print and digital editions, the last iteration from 2016.

== Plot summary ==
A merchant loses all his money when his ships are lost at sea, and is forced to move his three daughters to a lonely countryside house called Rose Cottage which was left to his youngest, Beauty, in a will, and thus is not subject to his creditors. The garden of the house is full of strange thorny bushes and vines, which neither the merchant nor his three daughters recognize but are told by the townspeople that they are rose bushes. The roses bloom under Beauty's care, and the sisters sell wreaths of them in the town. One day, the merchant receives word that one of his ships has appeared. Before his journey, he asks his daughters what presents they would like him to bring back, and Beauty requests a rose, as her bush has not blossomed that year.

When the merchant arrives, his ship is there but his creditors have already seized the ship's cargo to pay for his debts. After being turned out from a former employee's home, he leaves the city in bad weather on a borrowed pony. On the way he gets lost in a snow storm, and ends up at a magnificent castle where he is given food and shelter. As he is leaving he notices a beautiful rose on a table and decides to take it back for Beauty. This enrages the castle's owner - a terrifying beast. When the merchant explains his actions, the Beast agrees to let him go on the condition that Beauty comes to live with him in the castle.

Beauty stays at the house for what seems to be seven days, during which she revives the roses in the Beast's greenhouse and calls small creatures (bats, birds, frogs/toads, hedgehogs) back to the palace. During her time in the castle, Beauty dreams every night of her family, and when she speaks to the Beast of how real her dreams seem, he admits to her that they are real. Beauty, distressed at missing so much of her sisters' lives, begs Beast to allow her to return home to visit. He grants her request on one condition, that if she does not return to him by placing a petal on her tongue before the last petal falls from the rose he gives her, he will die.

When Beauty returns to the Beast and declares her love for him, she is given a choice. Either the Beast returns to his human form and regains his wealth and power, thereby also returning her family to their former status, or he stays as is and they live a peaceful peasant life in the village. Depending on her choice, their names would be spoken throughout the land if she chooses to return Beast to human form. She asks how they will be spoken, and on hearing that it would be in fear and dread, she chooses the peaceful peasant life. The pair return home to Rose Cottage and Beauty's family.

== Editions ==
An unabridged audio-book recording was released in 2013 by Recorded Books, narrated by Bianca Amato, and is available via Audible.com.

== Critical reception ==
Considering that this is the second retelling of Beauty and the Beast from Robin McKinley, there is less scholarly or critical response to Rose Daughter, or to compare the two, with the exception of Evelyn Perry who has done work at great length on Robin McKinley's work. In Perry's article, from January 2004 in The Looking Glass: New Perspectives on Children's Literature Volume 8 Issue 1, compares Rose Daughter and Beauty through present and absent motifs, like mirrors and both iterations of Beauty being removed from their own self image. McKinley, having written several other adaptations of fairy tales and folktales, utilizes these works as personal retellings. McKinley publicly mentioned the multiple versions of the same story and about her own work on Rose Daughter on her personal blog, titled The Flying Piano:

"I said in the afterword to ROSE DAUGHTER, my second official Beauty & the Beast retelling, that someone once said that every writer has only one story to tell, & their life (& their royalties) depends on whether they can continue to find interesting ways to retell that one story."

In comparing it to McKinley's previous adaptation of Beauty and the Beast, Kathryn Harrison wrote in The New York Times, "Ironically, this reworking has disabled the fairy tale, robbing it of tension and meaning, and creating for her readers a less usable enchantment." Harrison mentions McKinley's authorial note following the text in her criticism of Rose Daughter, where McKinley reasons that her new retelling stems from her recent marriage and new found love of gardening, specifically rose gardening. Sally Estes of Booklist review of Rose Daughter is more complimentary than Harrison's, calling it “a more mystical, darker edge” in comparison to Beauty: A Retelling of the Story of Beauty and the Beast.

== Folklore categorization and bildungsroman ==
Beauty and the Beast, originating with Gabrielle-Suzanne de Villenueve and Jeanne-Marie Leprince de Beaumont, exists in the folkloric tradition under specific classifications. Under the Aarne-Thompson-Uther Index, the folktale is labeled ATU425A "The Animal as Bridegroom" and AT 425A "Animal Bridegroom". However, the Aarne-Thompson-Uther Index, also labels Beauty and the Beast stories in their own subsection ATU 425C "Beauty and the Beast" and AT 425C "Beauty and the Beast". McKinley's Rose Daughter follows a specific subcategorization of this index with C761.2. "Taboo: staying too long at home".

Rose Daughter can be classified as a bildungsroman, another classification system that interacts with folklore specifically, as Beauty reaches a coming-of-age through the course of the novel.
