= Dragonhaven =

2007 novel by Robin McKinley

- First edition
- Author: Robin McKinley
- Cover artist: Pamelina Hovnathnian
- Language: English
- Genre: Fantasy novel
- Publisher: Putnam
- Publication date: 2007
- Publication place: United States
- Media type: Print (Paperback)
- Pages: 352
- ISBN: 978-0-399-24675-3
- OCLC: 122525557
- LC Class: PZ7.M1988 Dr 2007

Dragonhaven is a fantasy novel written by Robin McKinley, published by Putnam in 2007.

== Plot summary ==
The story is set in the Smokehill National Park, a wildlife preserve for the preservation and study of dragons. The dragons are elusive; evidence of their existence can be found everywhere, but the dragons themselves remain hidden. Young Jake Mendoza, who lives with his father, the owner and director of the park, goes out for his first overnight solo and comes across a dying dragon. The dragon has been fatally injured by a poacher who has breached the security of the wildlife preserve.

The fact that a dragon has killed a human, even a poacher, will make life very complicated for Smokehill National Park, which exists in a tough political climate, due to the controversial nature of keeping dragons alive. But what makes life even more complicated for Jake is that he discovers that the dying dragon had been a mother, and that one of her dragonlets is still alive. It is illegal to save the dragon's life, but Jake, having discovered the baby dragon, cannot leave it to die. He takes the dragon home and raises it.

However, this creates a controversy. The family of the dead poacher want the dragons at Dragonhaven killed. Jake and the other rangers are trying their best to convince those against the preservation of dragons that the creatures are really peaceful and friendly.

The bulk of the story involves Jake's growing relationship with the young dragon and other dragons, all the responsibilities that come along with caring for an orphaned wild animal, and his own maturation from child to young adult. The novel is written in a childish style at first, but Jake's writing style matures as he matures.

In the end, Dragonhaven is saved by Jake and his dragon "friends," as they slowly learn how their two species can communicate with each other by their mind, in the process proving that dragons are as intelligent as humans and wish to be at peace with them.

== Characters ==
- Jake Mendoza - main character
- Lois - the dragon-let that Jake finds
- Martha - a friend of Jake's (marries Jake later on)
- Eleanor - Martha's younger sister
- Billy - the Head Ranger at SmokeHill National Park
- Frank Mendoza- the top person at SmokeHill National Park, runs the whole park (Jake's father)
- Eric - Jake's "enemy" at DragonHaven. Dislikes Jake for unknown reasons
- Snark - Jake's deceased dog
- Bud and Gulp - two dragons Jake befriends due to Lois
- Grace - Billy's wife
- Katie - Martha and Eleanor's Mother
- Poacher - A bad guy who kills Lois's Mom

== Reception ==
Dragonhaven received starred reviews from Kirkus Reviews and Publishers Weekly.

Kirkus Reviews referred to the novel as "a sharply incisive, wildly intelligent dragon fantasy involving profound layers of science and society, love and loss and nature and nurture", while Publishers Weekly called it a "big, ambitious novel". They highlighted how "McKinley renders her imagined universe so potently that readers will wish they could book their next vacation in Smokehill". Their only critique was that, "because Jake tells the story as a memoir, some climactic moments tend to be relayed at arm’s length". Kirkus Reviews disagreed with this critique, noting that Jake's "tight narration is penetratingly insightful about emotion, biology, language and the intricate love/hate relationship between science and humanity".

Booklist's Jennifer Mattson wrote, "McKinley offers a compelling premise, portraying the demands and rewards of Jake's foster-parenting with particular clarity".

Mattson and School Library Journal's Jessica Moody both discussed issues relating the plot development. Mattson noted that "the central plotlines frequently feel lost in the tangled digressions of Jake's stream-of-consciousness narrative", and Moody thought the novel had a "relatively slow pace".

Moody concluded that "Noah Galvin injects liveliness to this unique tale with his expressive narrative style and voices".
