= The Outlaws of Sherwood =

1988 novel by Robin McKinley

- First edition
- Author: Robin McKinley
- Cover artist: Alan Lee
- Language: English
- Genre: Science Fiction and Fantasy
- Publisher: Greenwillow Books; Ace Fantasy; Firebird
- Publication date: 1988 (Greenwillow); 1989 (Ace Fantasy); 2002 (Firebird)
- English publication date: 1988
- Pages: 288 (hardcover)
- ISBN: 978-0-688-07178-3 (hardcover); 978-0698119598 (paperback, 2002 edition)

The Outlaws of Sherwood is a retelling of the legend of Robin Hood by Robin McKinley. In McKinley's afterword, she says, "The retellings through the centuries have echoed concurrent preoccupations." The story includes both the traditional Robin Hood characters — Little John, Much, Friar Tuck, Marian and Alan-a-dale — and characters of McKinley's own invention. Notably, three of the most important characters are women, all of whom escape marriage to prospective spouses chosen by their fathers.

== Summary ==
Robin is a forester in Sherwood forest. As he leaves an archery contest, someone shoots at him and only just misses. Without thinking, Robin returns fire and kills someone. Robin's friends Marian and Much convince him to become an outlaw. Robin hides in Sherwood Forest and gathers a band to oppose the tyrannous Sheriff of Nottingham. Unsurprisingly they rob the rich, give to the poor, and poach deer.

Newcomers join the band, including the huge Little John and Will Scarlet. Will hears that his sister does not want to marry a Norman baron, but Robin refuses to help. A young minstrel named Alan-a-dale asks for help. His beloved, Marjorie, is to wed a baron and he wants to rescue her. The outlaws get Friar Tuck to perform the marriage to Alan instead of the original groom. Alan and Marjorie join Robin's band, which takes in a mysterious young man called Cecil, who is later found to be a girl, and whom Will recognizes as his sister, Cecily. She stays in the band.

Robin hears that Sir Richard of the Lea, who had been kind to Robin when he was a forester, is about to lose his property due to debts. The outlaws give Sir Richard the money he needs.

There is an archery contest with a prize of a golden arrow; it is clearly a trap so Robin does not go. Marian wears a disguise and wins the contest. Guy of Gisbourne, a mercenary hired by the Sheriff of Nottingham, attacks her thinking that she is Robin. Cecily and Little John spirit Marian away to Friar Tuck's hideout in the forest. Marian is badly hurt. Robin tells her he loves her and asks her to marry him. Guy of Gisbourne and his men find Tuck's hideout. The band beat them off.

Sir Richard takes the outlaws to his castle to keep them safe but the Sheriff is furious that Sir Richard is protecting them. Both he and Sir Richard send word to King Richard the Lionheart. Little John and Cecily say they love each other. King Richard shows up at Sir Richard's castle unannounced. He makes all the outlaws swear loyalty to him, and tells them that they must join the crusades. The king makes Robin the heir to Sir Richard’s lands and says that Robin and Marian can marry.

== Reception ==
Reviewing The Outlaws of Sherwood in Dragon magazine, John C. Bunnell stated "McKinley's retelling of Sherwood Forest's familiar history is wise and deeply satisfying, enough so that it is hard to imagine a version of the legend that could be discernibly better".
