= Sleeping Beauty =

European fairy tale

The Sleeping Beauty
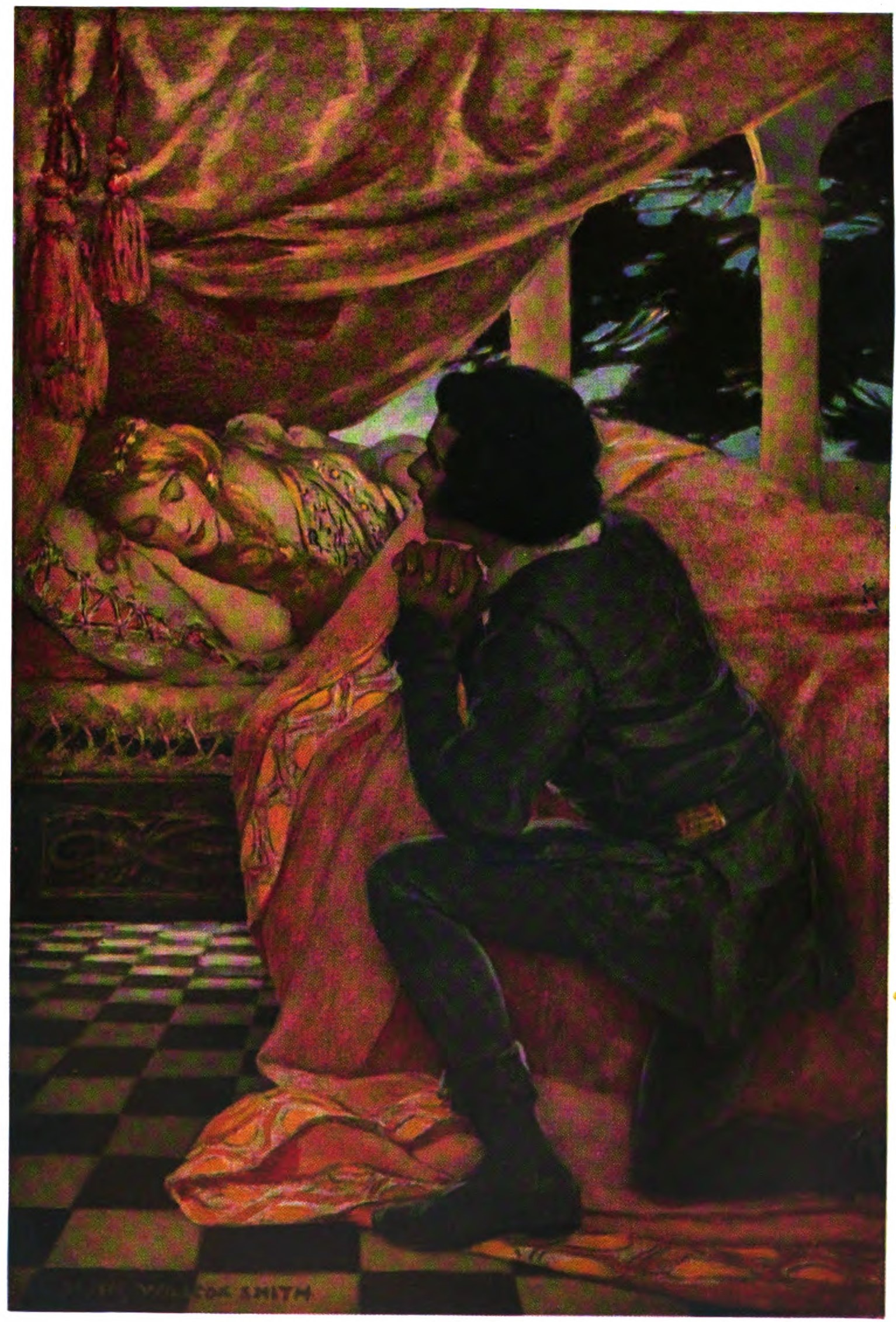
- Illustration by Jessie Willcox Smith (1911)

Folk tale
- Name: The Sleeping Beauty
- Also known as: La Belle au bois dormant (The Beauty Sleeping in the Wood)
- Aarne–Thompson grouping: ATU 410 (Sleeping Beauty)
- Region: Centre-Val de Loire
- Published in: Histoires ou contes du temps passé (1697), by Charles Perrault; Children's and Household Tales (1812), by Brothers Grimm
- Related: "Sun, Moon, and Talia"

Sleeping Beauty (French: La Belle au bois dormant, or The Beauty Sleeping in the Wood; (Note: Literally, 'the beauty[,] in the wood[,] sleeping', where the present participle "sleeping" (dormant) refers to the beauty, not to the wood. In modern French, the title would be rendered as "La Belle dormant au bois". The positioning of present participles after their complements was frequent in Old French but is nowadays considered archaic (although it is still used in a number of set phrases such as chemin faisant and tambour battant), and the title has been misinterpreted as meaning "the beauty in the sleeping wood" as a result. It is also dormant and not dormante because present participles have been invariable in French since a decision of 3 June 1679 of the Académie Française (of which Charles Perrault was a member).), German: Dornröschen, or Little Briar Rose, Italian: La Bella Addormentata), also titled in English as The Sleeping Beauty in the Woods, is a fairy tale about a princess cursed by an evil fairy to sleep for a hundred years before being awakened by a handsome prince. A good fairy, knowing the princess would be frightened if alone when she wakes, uses her wand to put every living person and animal in the palace and forest asleep, to awaken when the princess does.

Though a precursor narrative appears in the anonymous romance Perceforest (written in French between 1330 and 1344) and in the Catalan poem Frayre de Joy e Sor de Paser, scholars generally regard "Sun, Moon, and Talia" by Italian author Giambattista Basile as the first fully developed literary version of the story, published posthumously in 1634–36 in the Pentamerone. This was later adapted in French by Charles Perrault in Histoires ou contes du temps passé in 1697. The version collected and printed by the Brothers Grimm was one orally transmitted from the Perrault version, while including its own attributes like the thorny rose hedge and the curse.

The Aarne-Thompson classification system for fairy tales lists "Sleeping Beauty" as a Type 410: it includes a princess who is magically forced into sleep and later woken, reversing the magic. The fairy tale has been adapted countless times throughout history and retold by modern storytellers across various media.

== Origin ==
Early contributions to the tale include the medieval courtly romance Perceforest (c. 1337–1344). In this tale, a princess named Zellandine falls in love with a man named Troylus. Her father sends him to perform tasks to prove himself worthy of her, and while he is gone, Zellandine falls into an enchanted sleep. Troylus finds her, and impregnates her in her sleep. When their child is born, the child draws from her finger the flax that caused her sleep. She realizes from the ring Troylus left her that he was the father, and Troylus later returns to marry her. Another early literary predecessor is the Provençal versified novel Fraire de Joi e sor de Plaser (c. 1320–1340).

The second part of the Sleeping Beauty tale, in which the princess and her children are almost put to death but instead are hidden, may have been influenced by Genevieve of Brabant. Even earlier influences come from the story of the sleeping Brynhild in the Volsunga saga and the tribulations of saintly female martyrs in early Christian hagiography conventions. Following these early renditions, the tale was first published by Italian poet Giambattista Basile who lived from 1575 to 1632.

== Plot ==
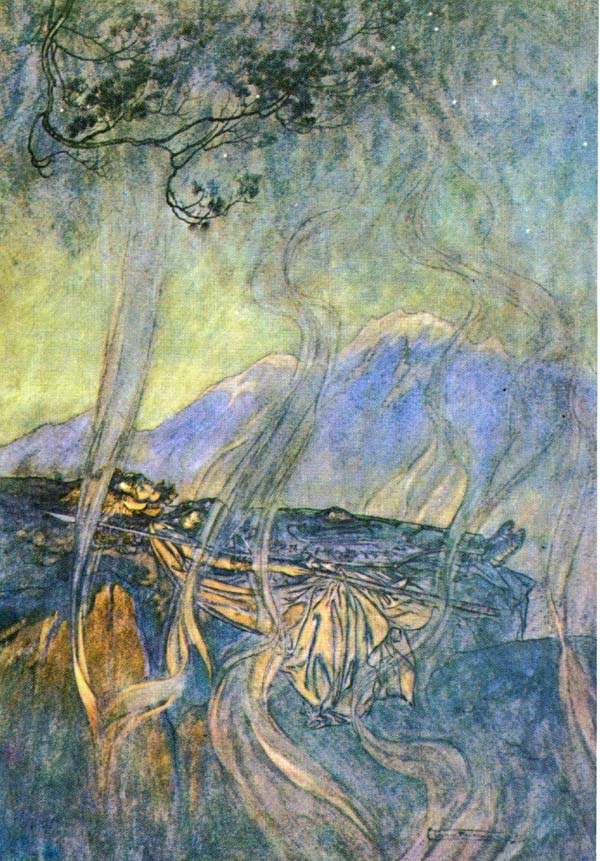
An older image of the sleeping princess: Brünnhilde, surrounded by magical fire rather than roses (illustration by Arthur Rackham to Richard Wagner's Die Walküre)

The folktale begins with a princess whose parents are told by a wicked fairy that their daughter will die when she pricks her finger on a particular item. In Basile's version, the princess pricks her finger on a piece of flax. In Perrault's and the Grimm Brothers' versions, the item is a spindle. The parents rid the kingdom of these items in the hopes of protecting their daughter, but the prophecy is fulfilled regardless. Instead of dying, as was foretold, the princess falls into a deep sleep. After some time, she is found by a prince and is awakened.

In Giambattista Basile's version of Sleeping Beauty, Sun, Moon, and Talia, the sleeping beauty, Talia, falls into a deep sleep after getting a splinter of flax in her finger. She is discovered in her palace by a wandering prince, who "carrie[s] her to a bed, where he gather[s] the first fruits of love." He abandons her there after the assault and she later gives birth to twins while still unconscious.

According to Maria Tatar, there are versions of the story that include a second part to the narrative that details the couple's troubles after their union; some folklorists believe the two parts were originally separate tales.

The second part begins after the prince and princess have had children. Through the course of the tale, the princess and her children are introduced in some way to another woman from the prince's life. This other woman is not fond of the prince's new family, and calls a cook to kill the children and serve them for dinner. Instead of obeying, the cook hides the children and serves livestock. Next, the other woman orders the cook to kill the princess. Before this can happen, the other woman's true nature is revealed to the prince and then she is subjected to the very death that she had planned for the princess. The princess, prince, and their children live happily ever after.

=== Basile's narrative ===
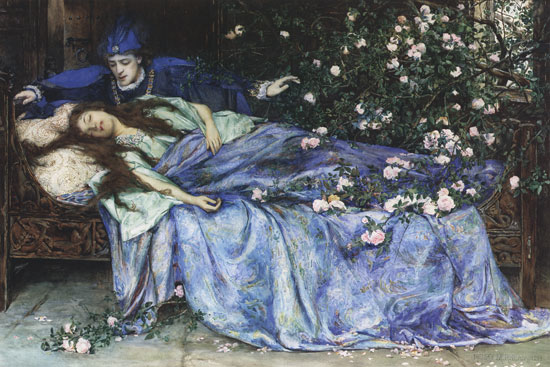
Sleeping Beauty, by Henry Meynell Rheam, 1899

In Giambattista Basile's dark version of Sleeping Beauty, Sun, Moon, and Talia, the sleeping beauty is named Talia. By asking wise men and astrologers to predict her future after her birth, her father, who is a great Lord, learns that Talia will be in danger from a splinter of flax. Talia, now grown, sees an old woman spinning outside her window. Intrigued by the sight of the twirling spindle, Talia invites the woman over and takes the distaff from her hand to stretch the flax. Tragically, the splinter of flax gets embedded under her nail, and she is put to sleep. After Talia falls asleep, she is seated on a velvet throne and her father, to forget his misery of what he thinks is her death, closes the doors and abandons the house forever. One day, while a king is walking by, one of his falcons flies into the house. The king knocks, hoping to be let in by someone, but no one answers, and he decides to climb in with a ladder. He finds Talia alive but unconscious, and impregnates her. Afterwards, he leaves her in bed and goes back to his kingdom. Though Talia is unconscious, she gives birth to twins—one of whom keeps sucking her finger. Talia awakens because the twin has sucked the flax from her finger. When she wakes up, she discovers that she is a mother and has no idea what happened to her. One day, the king decides he wants to see Talia again. He finds her awake and a mother to his twins. He describes what has happened, and they bond. After a few days, the king must return to his realm but promises he'll return to take her to his kingdom.

Back in his kingdom, his wife hears him saying "Talia, Sun, and Moon" in his sleep. She bribes and threatens the king's secretary to reveal the backstory. She then pretends she is the king and writes to Talia asking her to send the twins. On their arrival, the queen orders the cook to kill the twins and make dishes out of them to feed the king; instead, the cook takes the twins to his wife and hides them. He then cooks two lambs and serves them as if they were the twins. Every time the king mentions how good the food is, the queen replies, "Eat, eat, you are eating of your own." Later, the queen invites Talia to the kingdom intending to burn her alive, but the king discovers the truth. He then orders that his wife be burned along with those who betrayed him, while he rewards the cook. The story ends with the king marrying Talia and living happily ever after.

=== Perrault's narrative ===
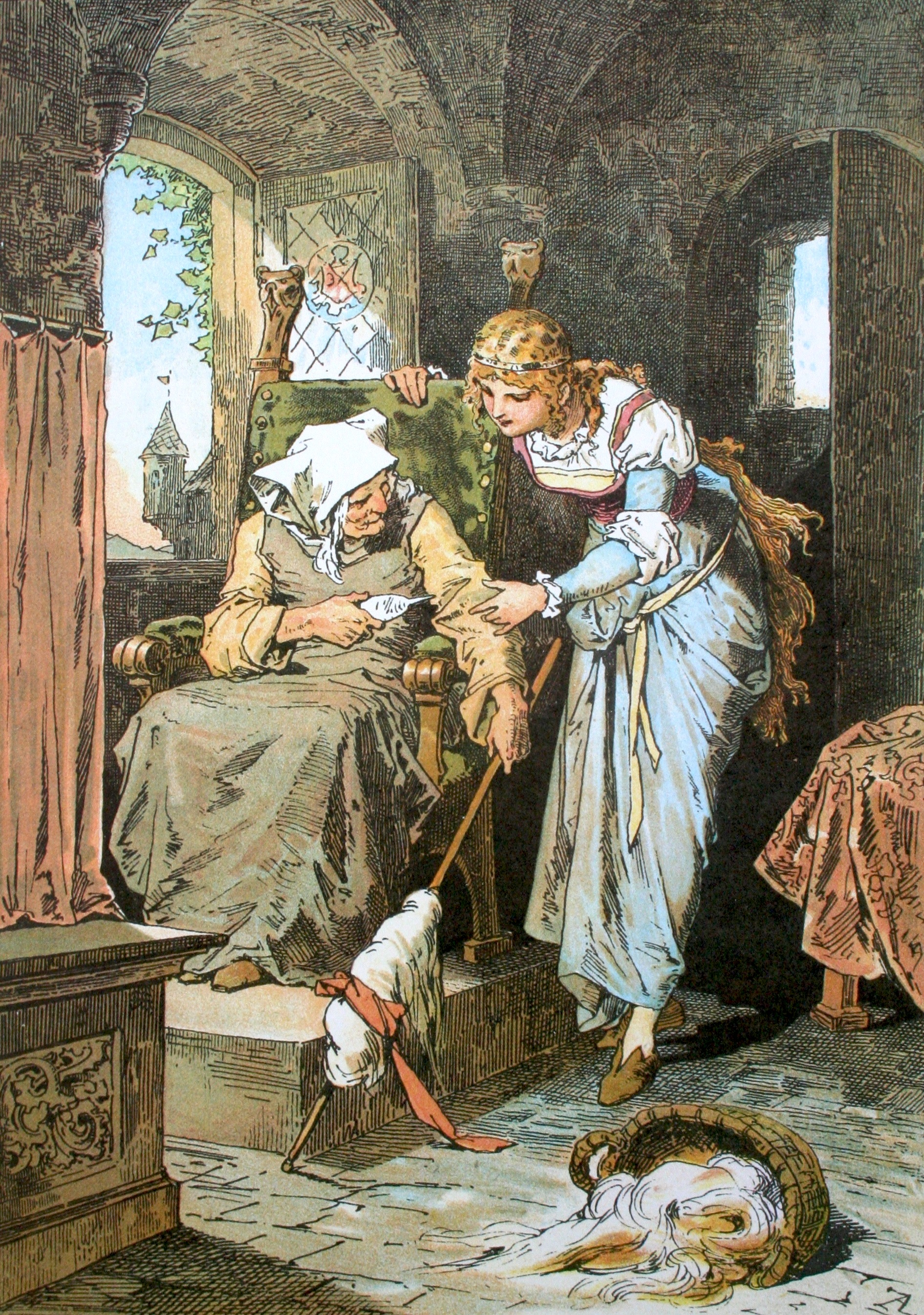
Sleeping Beauty is shown a spindle by the old woman. Sleeping Beauty, by Alexander Zick (1845–1907)

Perrault's narrative is written in two parts, which some folklorists believe were originally separate tales, as they were in the Brothers Grimm's version, and were later joined by Giambattista Basile and once more by Perrault. According to folklore editors Martin Hallett and Barbara Karasek, Perrault's tale is a much more subtle and pared down version than Basile's story in terms of the more immoral details. An example of this is depicted in Perrault's tale by the prince's choice to instigate no physical interaction with the sleeping princess when he discovers her.

At the christening of the king and queen's long-awaited child, seven good fairies are invited to be the baby princess's godmothers and bless her. At the palace banquet, each fairy receives a golden box of bejeweled utensils. Then, an old fairy arrives, forgotten because she has not left her tower in fifty years and was thought to be dead. Nevertheless, she is given a seat and a box of plain utensils. When the seventh fairy hears her muttering threats, she hides behind the curtains, determined to give her gift last in case the uninvited guest tries to harm the princess.

After the first six fairies have bestowed their gifts on the princess, the eighth fairy, furious at not being invited, curses the princess so that one day she will prick her finger on a spindle and die. The seventh fairy then offers her gift, attempting to soften the curse by having the princess fall into a deep sleep for a century, to be awakened by a prince.

The King then orders all spinning wheels in the kingdom banned and destroyed in an attempt to avert the eighth fairy's curse on his daughter. One day, after the Princess has come of age, She wanders through the palace rooms and comes across an old woman—really the evil fairy in disguise—spinning at her wheel. The Princess, having never seen one before, asks to try it, but as soon as she pricks her finger on the spindle, the curse is fulfilled and she falls into a deep sleep. The old woman cries for help, and efforts to revive the Princess fail. The King, accepting it as fate, places her in her bed. The seventh fairy, foreseeing the Princess's distress upon waking alone, casts a spell to put everyone in the castle to sleep, except the King and Queen. After kissing their daughter goodbye, they leave to prevent anyone from disturbing her, while the fairy summons a forest to grow around the castle, hiding it from the world.

After a hundred years, a prince from another royal family comes across a hidden castle during a hunting trip. An old man shares its history, telling him that a king's son is destined to awaken the princess. The prince pushes through the forest, enters the castle, and is captivated by her unmatched beauty. The spell breaks, the princess wakes, and she gives the prince a look "more tender than a first glance might seem to warrant" (in Perrault's original French tale, there is no kiss). They talk for a long while, as the castle's servants awaken and resume their duties. Eventually, the prince and princess are married in the castle chapel by the chaplain.

After marrying the Sleeping Beauty in secret, the Prince visits her for four years and she bears him two children, unbeknownst to his mother, who is an ogre. When his father, the King, dies, the Prince ascends the throne and he brings his wife, who is now twenty years old, and their two children – a four-year-old daughter named Morning (Aurore or Dawn in the original French) and a three-year-old son named Day (Jour in the original French) – to his kingdom.

One day, the new King must go to war against his neighbor, Emperor Contalabutte, and leaves his mother to govern the kingdom and look after his family. After her son leaves, the Ogress Queen Mother sends her daughter-in-law to a house secluded in the woods and orders her cook to prepare Morning with Sauce Robert for dinner. The kind-hearted cook substitutes a lamb for the princess, which satisfies the Queen Mother. She then demands Day, but the cook this time substitutes a kid for the prince, which also satisfies the Queen Mother. When the Ogress demands that he serve up the Sleeping Beauty, the latter substitutes a hind prepared with Sauce Robert, satisfying the Ogress, and secretly reuniting the young Queen with her children, who have been hidden by the cook's wife and maid. However, the Queen Mother soon discovers the cook's trick and she prepares a tub in the courtyard filled with vipers and other noxious creatures. The King returns home unexpectedly and the Ogress, her true nature having been exposed, throws herself into the tub and is fully consumed by the creatures. The King, young Queen, and children then live happily ever after.

=== Brothers Grimm's version ===
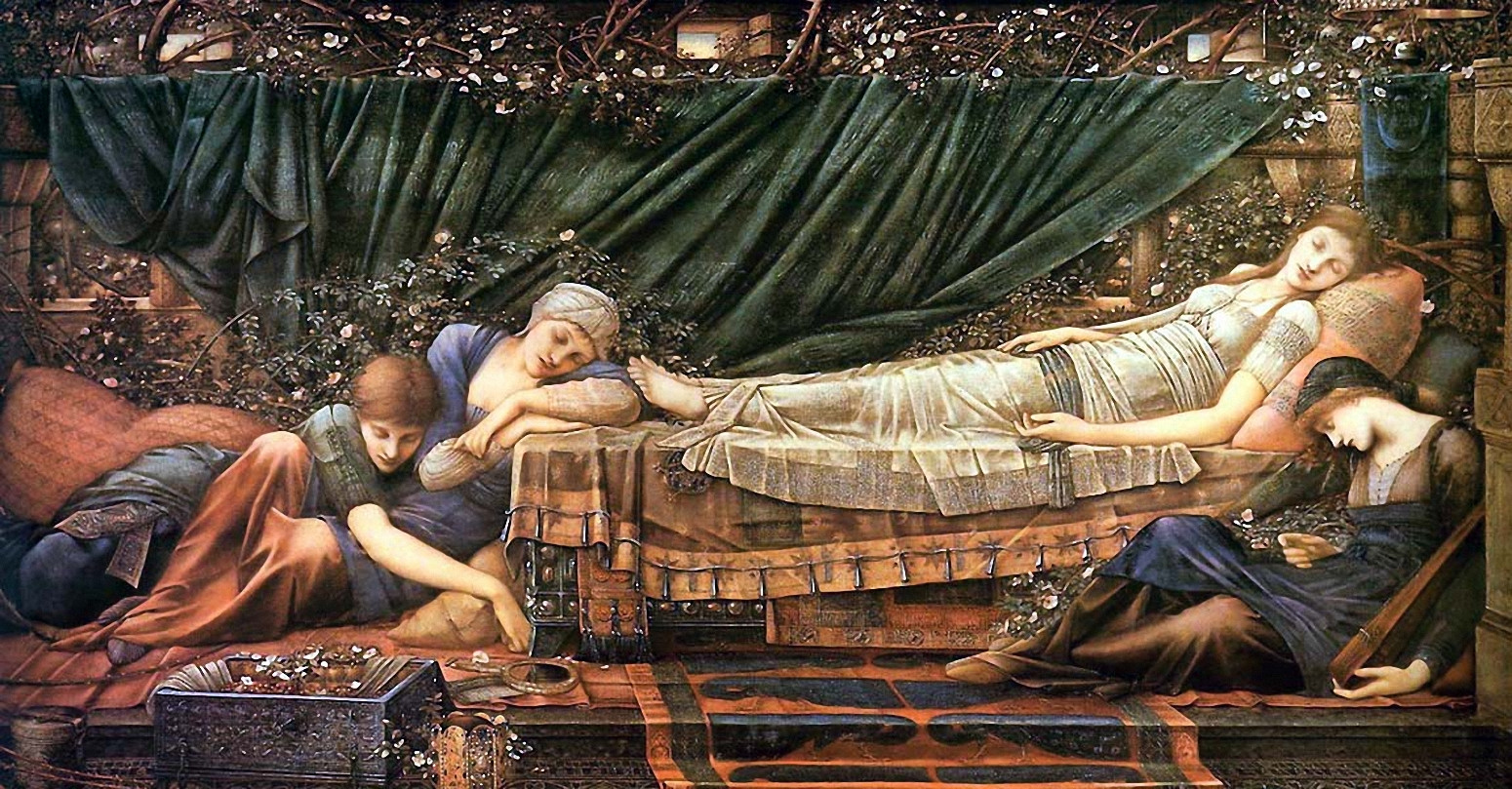
Sleeping Beauty and the palace dwellers under a century-long sleep enchantment (The Sleeping Beauty by Sir Edward Burne-Jones)

The Brothers Grimm included a variant of Sleeping Beauty, Little Briar Rose, in the first volume of Children's and Household Tales (published 1812). Their version ends when the prince arrives to wake Sleeping Beauty with a kiss and does not include the part two as found in Basile's and Perrault's versions. The brothers considered rejecting the story on the grounds that it was derived from Perrault's version, but the presence of the Brynhild tale convinced them to include it as an authentically German tale. Their decision was notable because in none of the Teutonic myths, meaning the Poetic and Prose Eddas or Volsunga Saga, are their sleepers awakened with a kiss, a fact Jacob Grimm would have known since he wrote an encyclopedic volume on German mythology. His version is the only known German variant of the tale, and Perrault's influence is almost certain. In the original Brothers Grimm's version, the fairies are instead wise women.

The Brothers Grimm also included, in the first edition of their tales, a fragmentary fairy tale, "The Evil Mother-in-law". This story begins with the heroine, a married mother of two children, and her mother-in-law, who attempts to eat her and the children. The heroine suggests an animal be substituted in the dish, and the story ends with the heroine's worry that she cannot keep her children from crying and getting the mother-in-law's attention. Like many German tales showing French influence, it appeared in no subsequent edition.

=== Variations ===
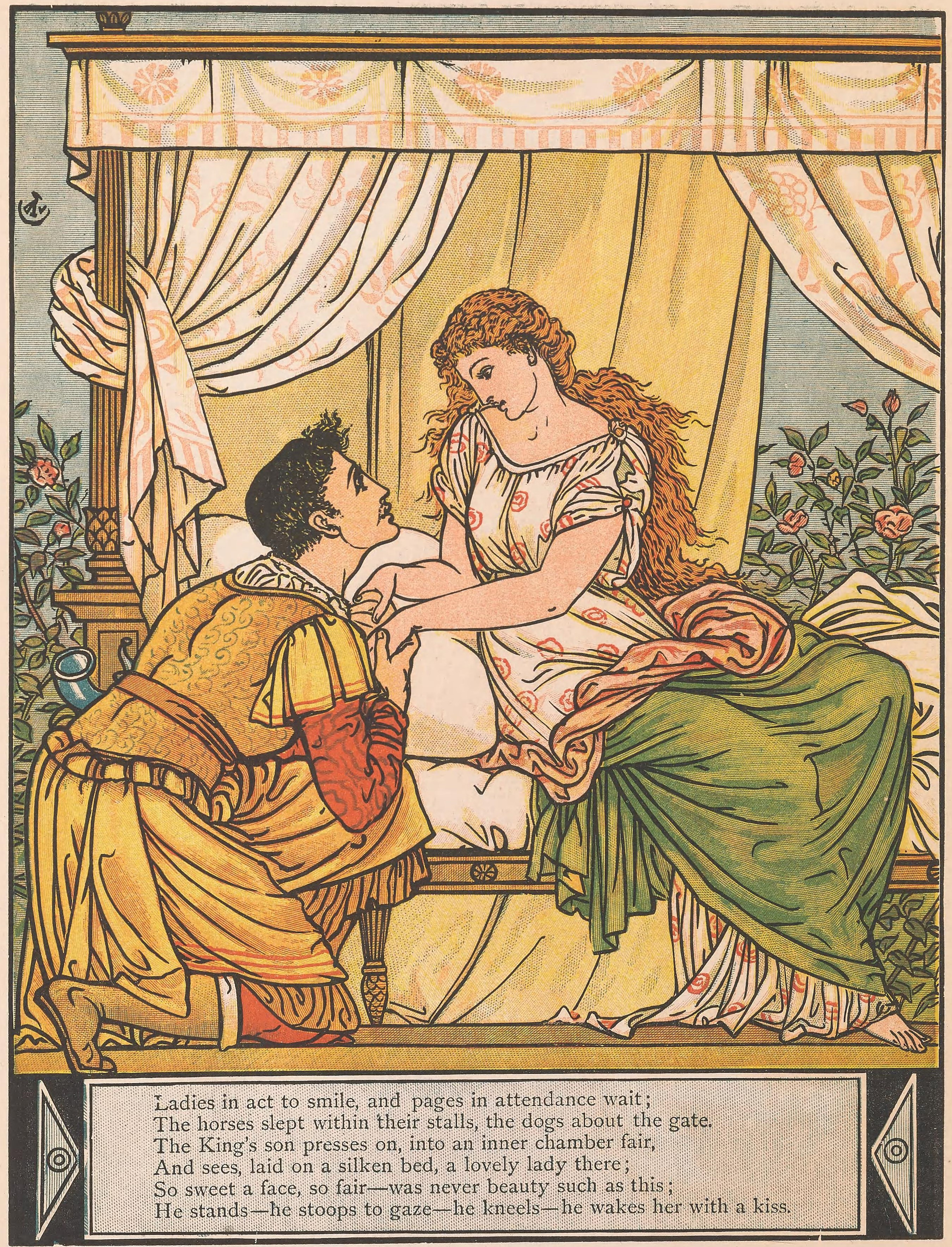
He stands—he stoops to gaze—he kneels—he wakes her with a kiss, woodcut by Walter Crane

The princess's name has varied from one adaptation to the other. In Sun, Moon, and Talia, she is named Talia (Sun and Moon being her twin children). She has no name in Perrault's story but her daughter is called "Aurore". The Brothers Grimm named her "Briar Rose" in their first collection. However, some translations of the Grimms' tale give the princess the name "Rosamond". Tchaikovsky's ballet and Disney's version named her Aurora; however, in the Disney version, she is also called "Briar Rose" in her childhood, when she is being raised incognito by the good fairies.

Besides Sun, Moon, and Talia, Basile included another variant of this Aarne-Thompson type, The Young Slave, in his book, The Pentamerone. The Grimms also included a second, more distantly related one titled The Glass Coffin.

Italo Calvino included a variant in Italian Folktales, "Sleeping Beauty and Her Children". In his version, the cause of the princess's sleep is a wish by her mother. As in Pentamerone, the prince rapes her in her sleep and her children are born. Calvino retains the element that the woman who tries to kill the children is the king's mother, not his wife, but adds that she does not want to eat them herself, and instead serves them to the king. His version came from Calabria, but he noted that all Italian versions closely followed Basile's.

In his More English Fairy Tales, Joseph Jacobs noted that the figure of the Sleeping Beauty was in common between this tale and the Romani tale The King of England and his Three Sons.

The hostility of the king's mother to his new bride is repeated in the fairy tale The Six Swans, and also features in The Twelve Wild Ducks, where the mother is modified to be the king's stepmother. However, these tales omit the attempted cannibalism.

Russian Romantic writer Vasily Zhukovsky wrote a versified work based on the theme of the princess cursed into a long sleep in his poem "Спящая царевна" ("The Sleeping Tsarevna"), published in 1832.

== Interpretations ==
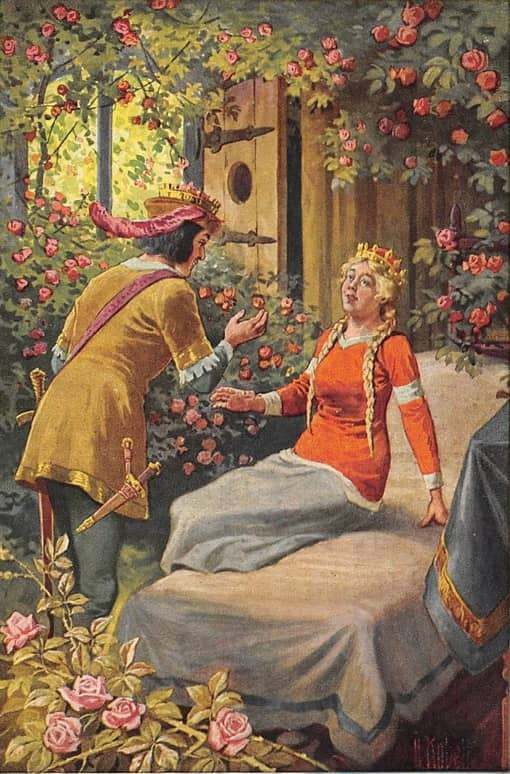
Otto Kubel (1868–1951)

According to Maria Tatar, the Sleeping Beauty tale has been disparaged by modern-day feminists who consider the protagonist to have no agency and find her passivity offensive; some feminists have even argued for people to stop telling the story altogether.

Disney has received criticism for depicting both Cinderella and the Sleeping Beauty princess as "naïve and malleable" characters. Time Out dismissed the princess as a "delicate" and "vapid" character. Sonia Saraiya of Jezebel echoed this sentiment, criticizing the princess for lacking "interesting qualities", where she also ranked her as Disney's least feminist princess. Similarly, Bustle also ranked the princess as the least feminist Disney Princess, with author Chelsea Mize expounding, "Aurora literally sleeps for like three quarters of the movie … Aurora just straight-up has no agency, and really isn't doing much in the way of feminine progress." Leigh Butler of Tor.com went on to defend the character, writing, "Aurora's cipher-ness in Sleeping Beauty would be infuriating if she were the only female character in it, but the presence of the Fairies and Maleficent allow her to be what she is without it being a subconscious statement on what all women are." Similarly, Refinery29 ranked Princess Aurora the fourth most feminist Disney Princess because, "Her aunts have essentially raised her in a place where women run the game." Despite being featured prominently in Disney merchandise, "Aurora has become an oft-forgotten princess", and her popularity pales in comparison to those of Cinderella and Snow White. Elle Fanning's portrayal as Aurora in Maleficent (2014) and Maleficent: Mistress of Evil (2019), however, has received praise. J.C. Maçek III of PopMatters said Fanning was an "inspired choice" for the character. Sheri Linden of The Hollywood Reporter wrote that Fanning brought a "diamond-in-the-rough aspect to Aurora's loveliness", and added that "she's no conventional Disney Princess but a child of nature with a strong sense of justice and an innate toughness." The Chicago Sun-Times's Richard Roeper praised Fanning's performance in the sequel for having, "quite a bit spunk and fight," while Empire's Helen O'Hara was pleased that in Mistress of Evil, "Fanning manages to occasionally find something useful for Aurora to do: no mean feat in a character essentially designed to be a simpering blank."

An example of the cosmic interpretation of the tale given by the nineteenth century solar mythologist school appears in John Fiske's Myths and Myth-Makers: "It is perhaps less obvious that winter should be so frequently symbolized as a thorn or sharp instrument ... Sigurd is slain by a thorn, and Balder by a sharp sprig of mistletoe; and in the myth of the Sleeping Beauty, the earth-goddess sinks into her long winter sleep when pricked by the point of the spindle. In her cosmic palace, all is locked in icy repose, naught thriving save the ivy which defies the cold, until the kiss of the golden-haired sun-god reawakens life and activity."

== Media ==
"Sleeping Beauty" has been popular for many fairytale fantasy retellings. Some examples are listed below:

=== Live-Action in film and television ===
La Belle au bois dormant (1908), directed by Lucien Nonguet and Albert Capellani

- La belle au Bois-Dormant (1902), a French silent film directed by Lucien Nonguet and Ferdinand Zecca.
- La Belle au bois dormant (1908), a French silent film directed by Lucien Nonguet and Albert Capellani.
- Dornröschen (1917), a German silent film directed by Paul Leni.
- Dornröschen (1929), a German silent film directed by Dorothy Douglas.
- Dornröschen (1936), a German film directed by Alf Zengerling.
- Prinsessa Ruusunen (1949), a Finnish film directed by Edvin Laine and scored with Erkki Melartin's incidental music from 1912.
- Dornröschen (1955), a West German film directed by Fritz Genschow.
- Shirley Temple's Storybook (1958), TV episode The Sleeping Beauty, directed by Mitchell Leisen and starring Anne Helm, Judith Evelyn and Alexander Scourby.
- Sleeping Beauty / Спящая красавица [Spjáščaja krasávica] (1964), a filmed version of the ballet produced by the Kirov Ballet along with Lenfilm studios, starring Alla Sizova as Princess Aurora.
- Archie Campbell satirized the story with "Beeping Sleauty" in several Hee Haw television episodes (1969-1993).
- Dornröschen (1971), an East German film directed by Walter Beck.
- Festival of Family Classics (1972–73), episode Sleeping Beauty, produced by Rankin/Bass and animated by Mushi Production.
- Some Call It Loving (also known as Sleeping Beauty) (1973).
- Jak se budí princezny (1978), a Czechoslovak film directed by Václav Vorlíček.
- Faerie Tale Theatre (1983), TV episode "Sleeping Beauty", directed by Jeremy Kagan and starring Christopher Reeve, Bernadette Peters and Beverly D'Angelo.
- Sleeping Beauty (1987), a direct-to-television musical film directed by David Irving.
- Bellas durmientes (Sleeping Beauties) (2001).
- The Sleeping Beauty (2010), a film by Catherine Breillat.
- Sleeping Beauty (2011), directed by Julia Leigh and starring Emily Browning, about a young girl who takes a sleeping potion and lets men have their way with her to earn extra money..
- Sleeping Beauty (2014), a film by Rene Perez.
- Sleeping Beauty (2014), a film by Casper Van Dien.
- Maleficent (2014), a live-action reimagining of the Walt Disney film.
  - Maleficent: Mistress of Evil (2019), the sequel to Maleficent (2014).
- The Curse of Sleeping Beauty (2016), an American horror film.

=== Animated in film and television ===
- Dornröschen (1941), a German stop-motion short directed by Ferdinand Diehl.
- The Sleeping Princess (1939), a Walter Lantz Productions animated short parodying the original fairy tale.
- Sleeping Beauty (1959), a Walt Disney animated film.
- Manga Fairy Tales of the World (1976–79), 10-minute adaptation. Japanese anime
- World Famous Fairy Tale Series (Sekai meisaku dōwa) (1975–83), later reused in the U.S. edit of My Favorite Fairy Tales.
- Goldilocks and the Three Bears/Rumpelstiltskin/Little Red Riding Hood/Sleeping Beauty (1984), direct-to-video featurette by Lee Mendelson Film Productions.
- An episode of the Japanese anime series Grimm's Fairy Tale Classics (1987–89) is dedicated to Princess Briar Rose.
- The Legend of Sleeping Brittany, a 1989 TV episode from Alvin and the Chimpunks is based on the fairy tale.
- Britannica's Tales Around the World (1990–91), features three Animated variations of the story.
- Sleeping Beauty (1991), a direct-to-video animated featurette produced by American Film Investment Corporation.
- Sleeping Beauty (1995), a Japanese-American direct-to-video animated film by Jetlag Productions.
- Happily Ever After: Fairy Tales for Every Child (1995), Animated TV episode Sleeping Beauty.
- The Legend of Sleeping Beauty (La leggenda della bella addormentata)(1999–2000), an Italian Animated television series.

=== In literature ===
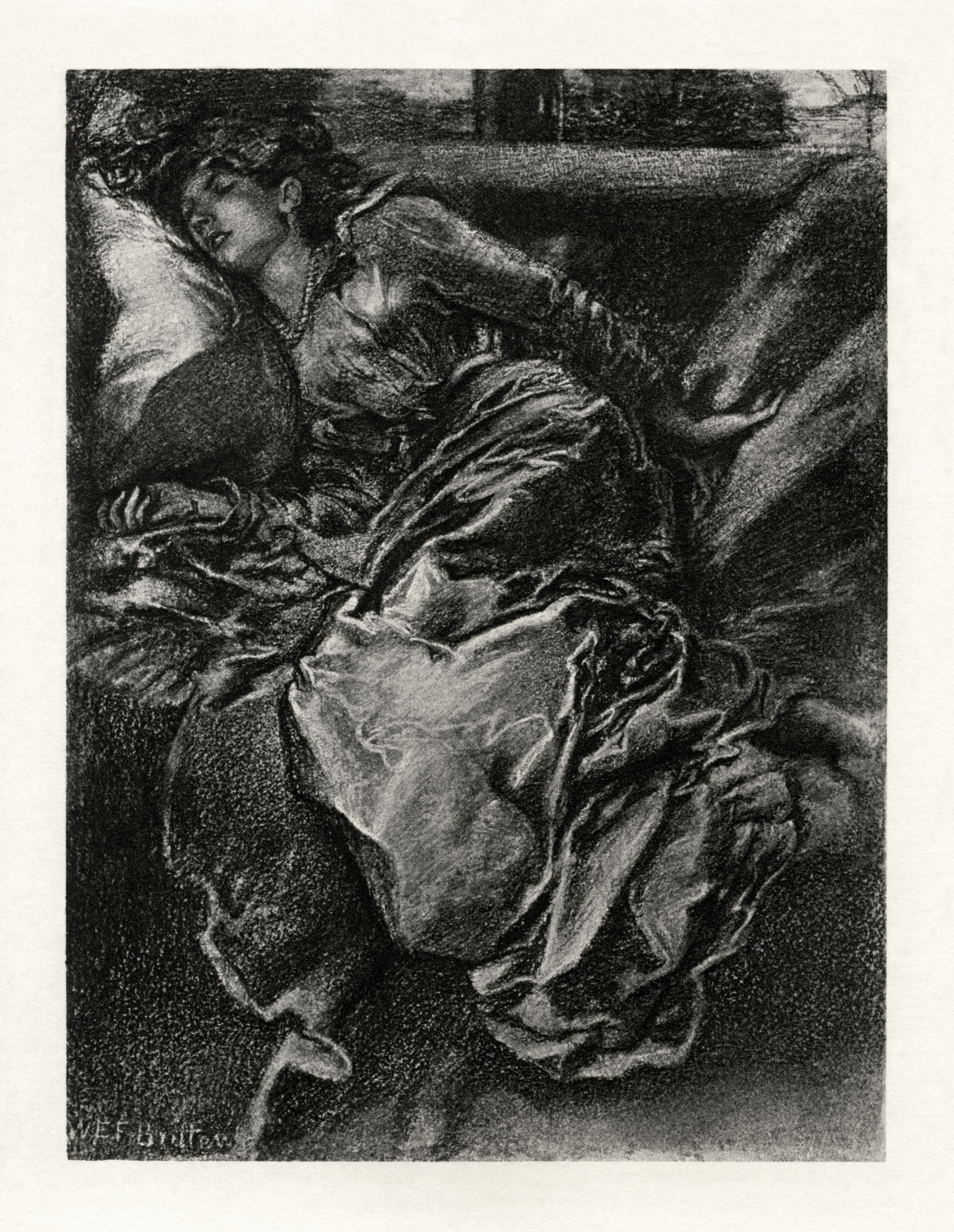
Illustration to Tennyson's 1830 poem, Sleeping Beauty

- Sleeping Beauty (1830) and The Day-Dream (1842), two poems based on Sleeping Beauty by Alfred, Lord Tennyson.
- The Rose and the Ring (1854), a satirical fantasy by William Makepeace Thackeray.
- The Sleeping Beauty (1919), a poem by Mary Carolyn Davies about a failed hero who did not waken the princess, but died in the enchanted briars surrounding her palace.
- The Sleeping Beauty (1920), a retelling of the fairy tale by Charles Evans, with illustrations by Arthur Rackham.
- Briar Rose (Sleeping Beauty) (1971), a poem by Anne Sexton in her collection Transformations (1971), in which she re-envisions sixteen of the Grimm's Fairy Tales.
- The Sleeping Beauty Quartet (1983–2015), four erotic novels written by Anne Rice under the pen name A.N. Roquelaure, set in a medieval fantasy world and loosely based on the fairy tale.
- Beauty (1992), a novel by Sheri S. Tepper.
- Briar Rose (1992), a novel by Jane Yolen.
- Enchantment (1999), a novel by Orson Scott Card based on the Russian version of Sleeping Beauty.
- Spindle's End (2000), a novel by Robin McKinley.
- Clementine (2001), a novel by Sophie Masson.
- Waking Rose (2007), novel by Regina Doman.
- A Kiss in Time (2009), a novel by Alex Flinn.
- The Sleeper and the Spindle (2012), a novel by Neil Gaiman.
- The Gates of Sleep (2012), a novel by Mercedes Lackey from the Elemental Masters series set in Edwardian England.
- Sleeping Beauty: The One Who Took the Really Long Nap (2018), a novel by Wendy Mass and the second book in the Twice Upon a Time series features a princess named Rose who pricks her finger and falls asleep for 100 years.
- The Sleepless Beauty (2019), a novel by Rajesh Talwar setting the story in a small kingdom in the Himalayas.
- Lava Red Feather Blue (2021), a novel by Molly Ringle involving a male/male twist on the Sleeping Beauty story.
- Malice (2021), a novel by Heather Walter told by the Maleficent character's (Alyce's) POV and involving a woman/woman love story.
- Misrule (2022), a novel by Heather Walter and sequel to Malice.
- Immortality, a poem by Lisel Mueller in her Pulitzer Prize winning book "Alive Together"

=== In music ===
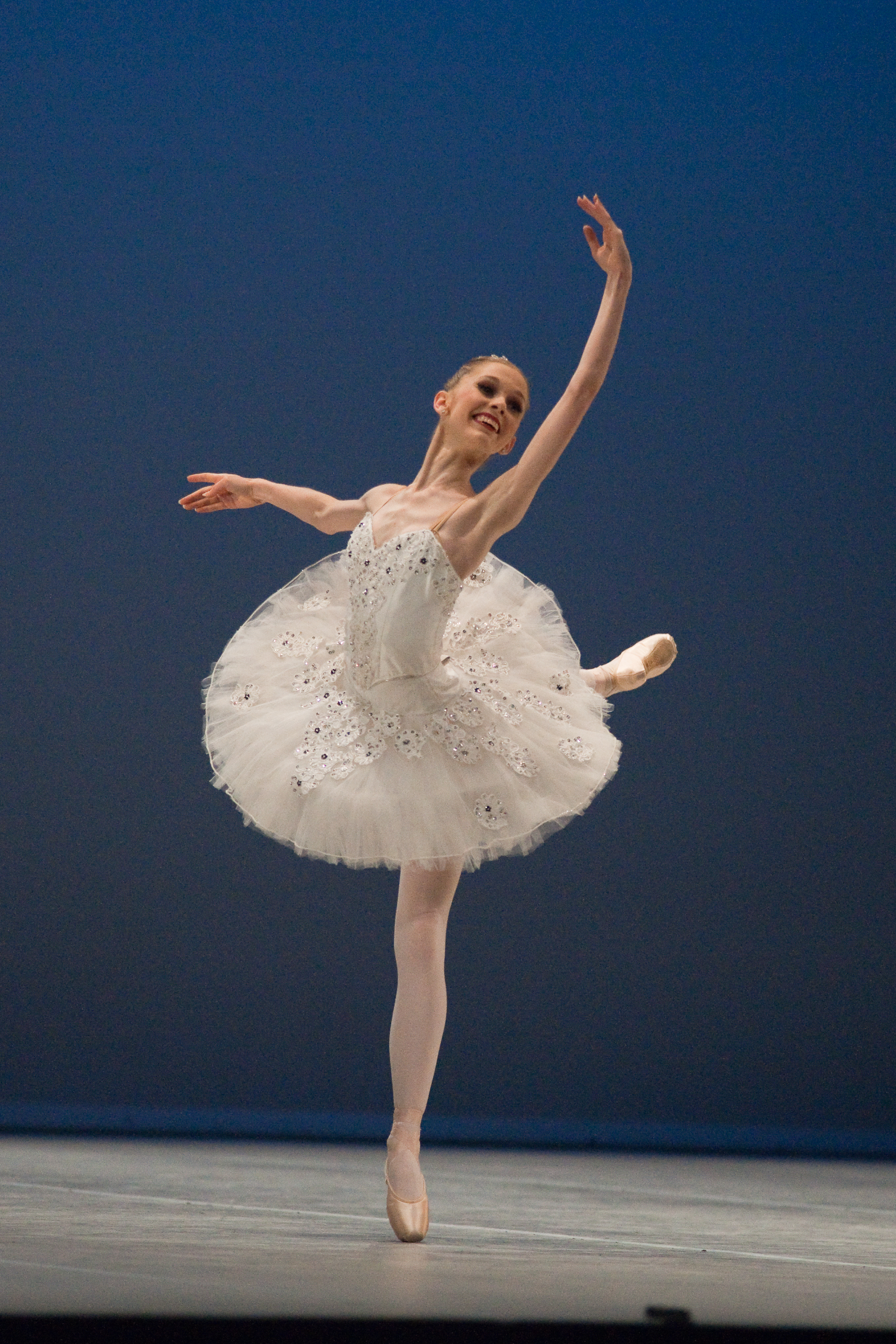
The Sleeping Beauty ballet, Emily Smith

- La Belle au Bois Dormant (1825), an opera by Michele Carafa.
- La belle au bois dormant (1829), a ballet in four acts with book by Eugène Scribe, composed by Ferdinand Hérold and choreographed by Jean-Louis Aumer.
- The Sleeping Beauty (1890), a ballet by Tchaikovsky.
- Dornröschen (1902), an opera by Engelbert Humperdinck.
- Pavane de la Belle au bois dormant (1910), the first movement of Ravel's Ma mère l'Oye.
- The Sleeping Beauty (1992), song on album Clouds by the Swedish band Tiamat.
- Sleeping Beauty Wakes (2008), an album by the American musical trio GrooveLily.
- There Was A Princess Long Ago, a common nursery rhyme or singing game typically sung stood in a circle with actions, retells the story of Sleeping Beauty in a summarised song.
- Sleeping Beauty The Musical (2019), a two act musical with book and lyrics by Ian Curran and music by Simon Hanson and Peter Vint.
- Hex (2021) is a musical with book by Tanya Ronder, music by Jim Fortune and lyrics by Rufus Norris that opened at the Royal National Theatre in December 2021.

=== In video games ===
- Kingdom Hearts is a video game in which Maleficent is one of the main antagonists and Aurora is one of the Princesses of Heart together with the other Disney princesses.
- The PlayStation 2 game Quest for Sleeping Beauty (2006) loosely adapts the story into a Pac-Man style maze game.
- Video game series Dark Parables adapted the tale as the plot of its first game, Curse of Briar Rose (2010).
- Little Briar Rose (2019) is a point-and-click adventure inspired by the Brothers Grimm's version of the fairy tale.
- SINoALICE (2017) is a mobile gacha game which features Sleeping Beauty as one of the main player characters. She has her own dark story-line which follows her unending desire to sleep, and crosses over with the other fairy-tale characters featured in the game.

=== In art ===
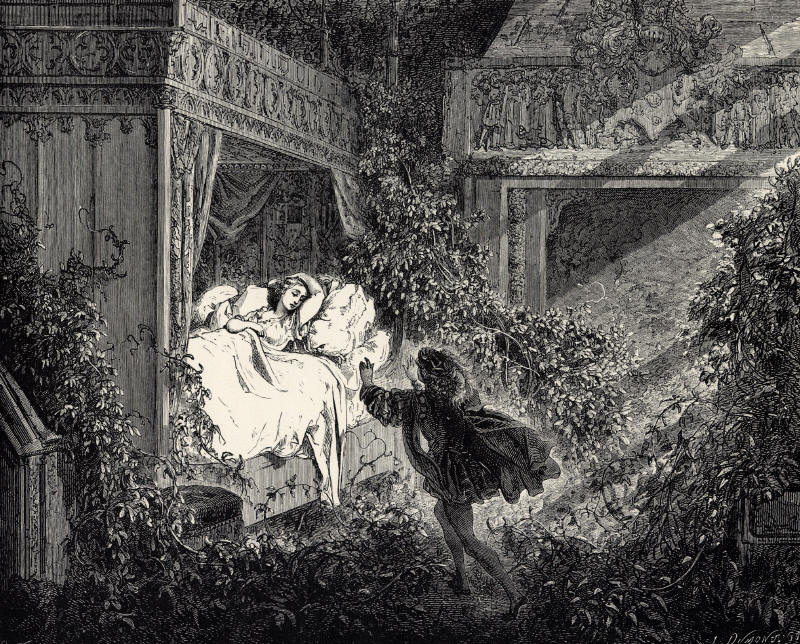
Perrault's La Belle au bois dormant (Sleeping Beauty), illustration by Gustave Doré

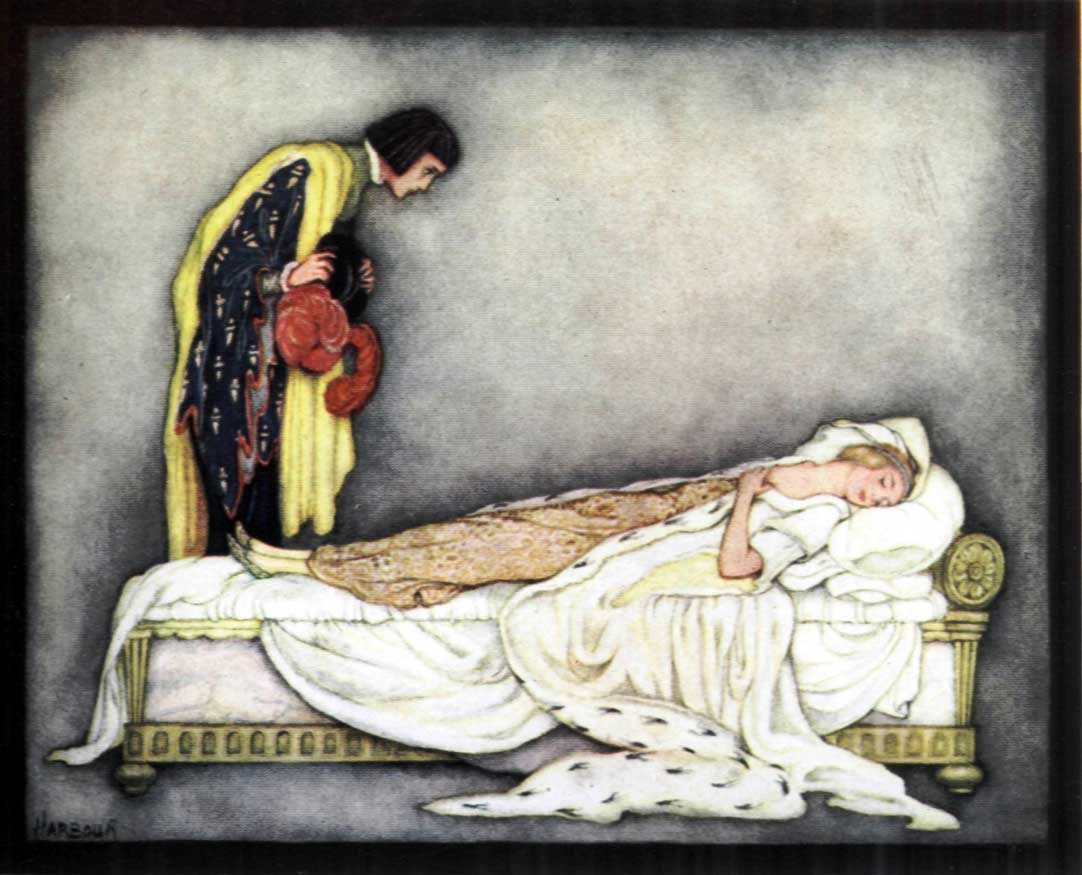
Sleeping Beauty by Jenny Harbour

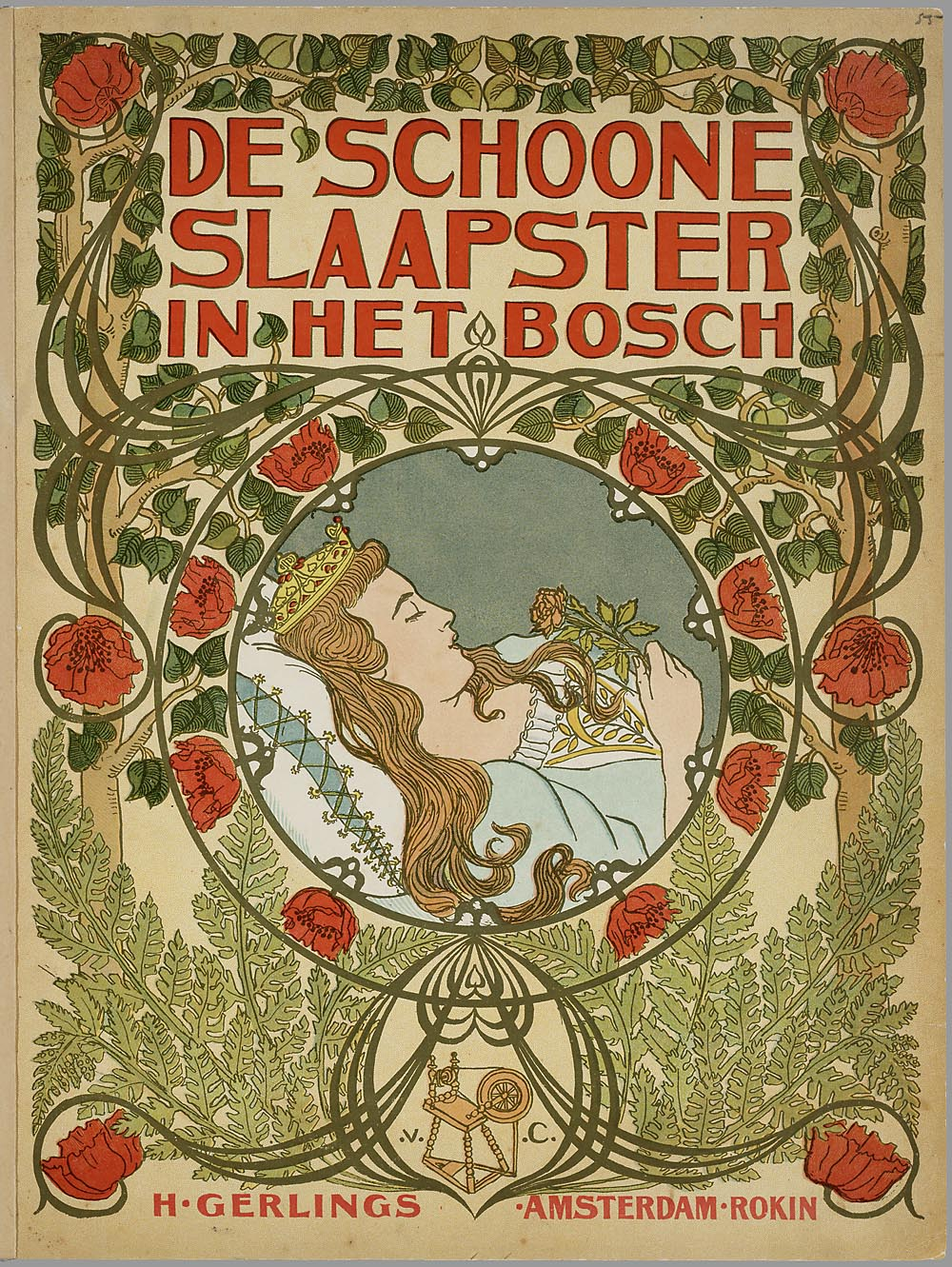
Book cover for a Dutch interpretation of the story by Johann Georg van Caspel

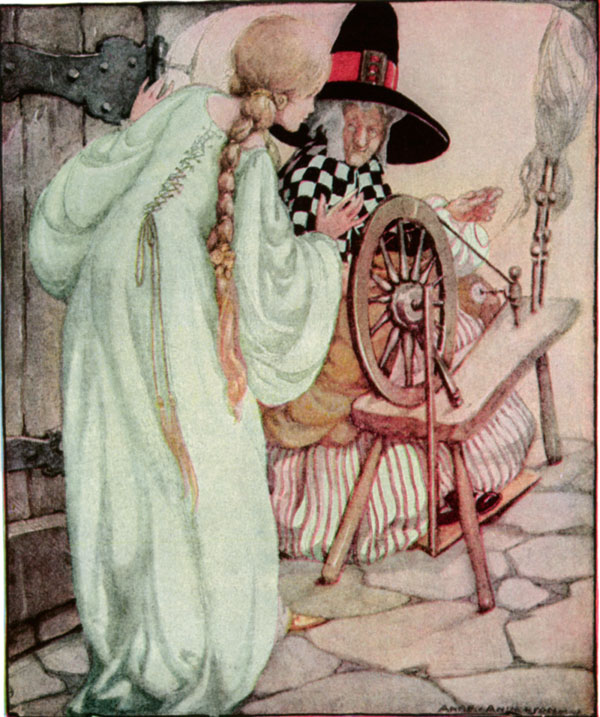
Briar Rose

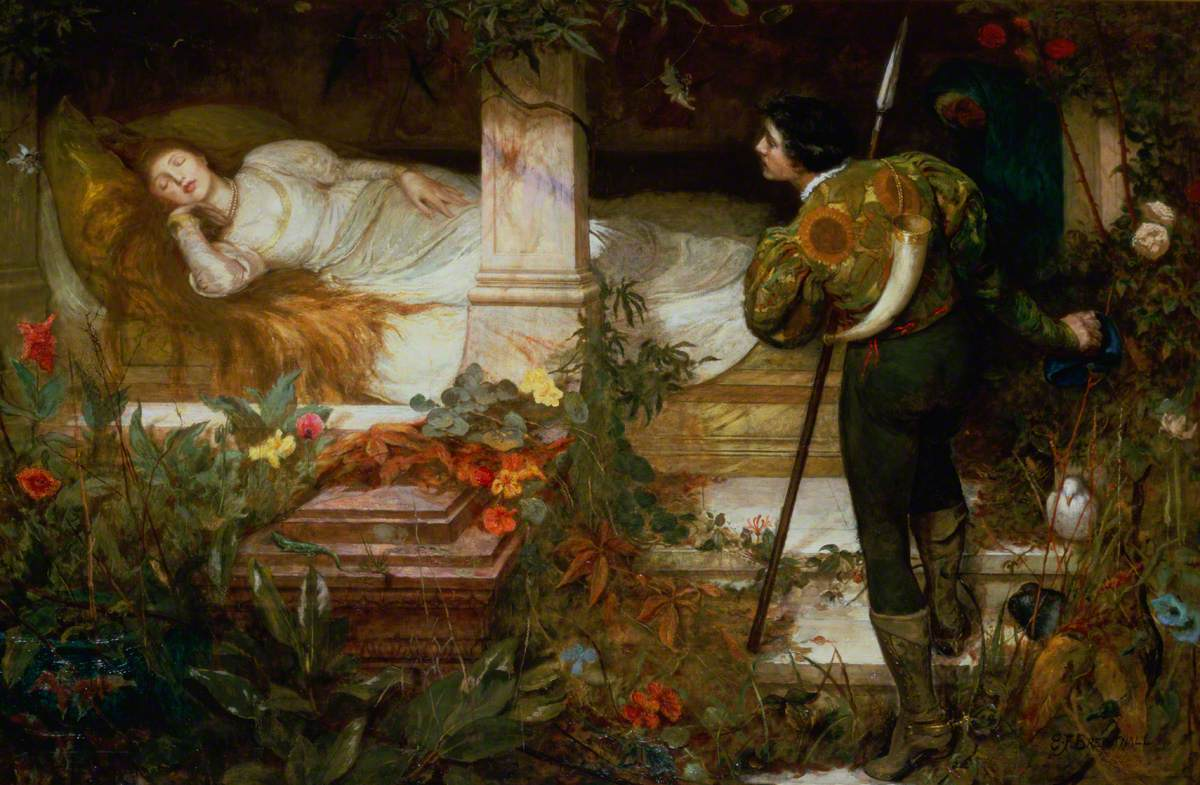
Sleeping Beauty by Edward F. Brewtnall

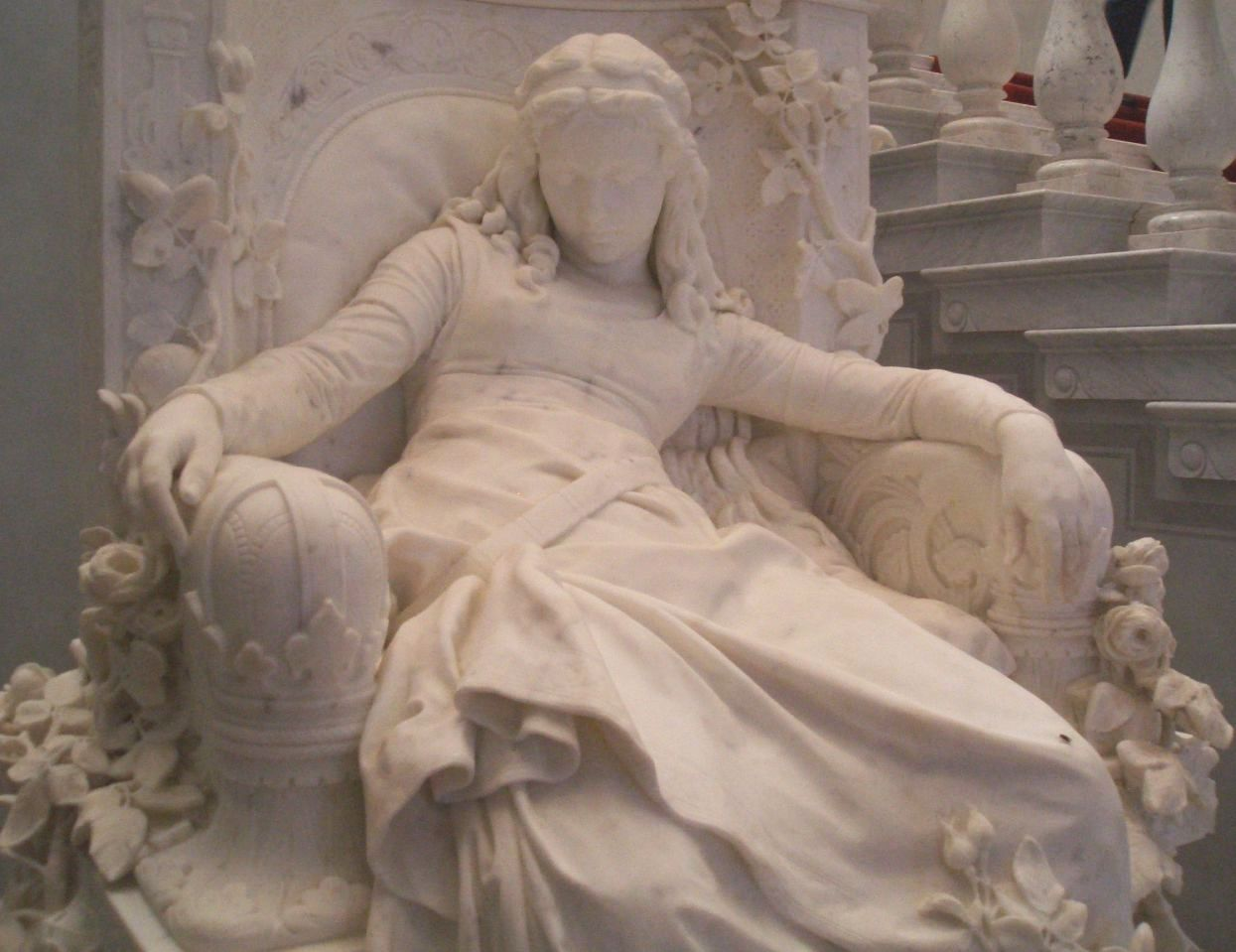
Louis Sußmann-Hellborn (1828- 1908) Sleeping Beauty,

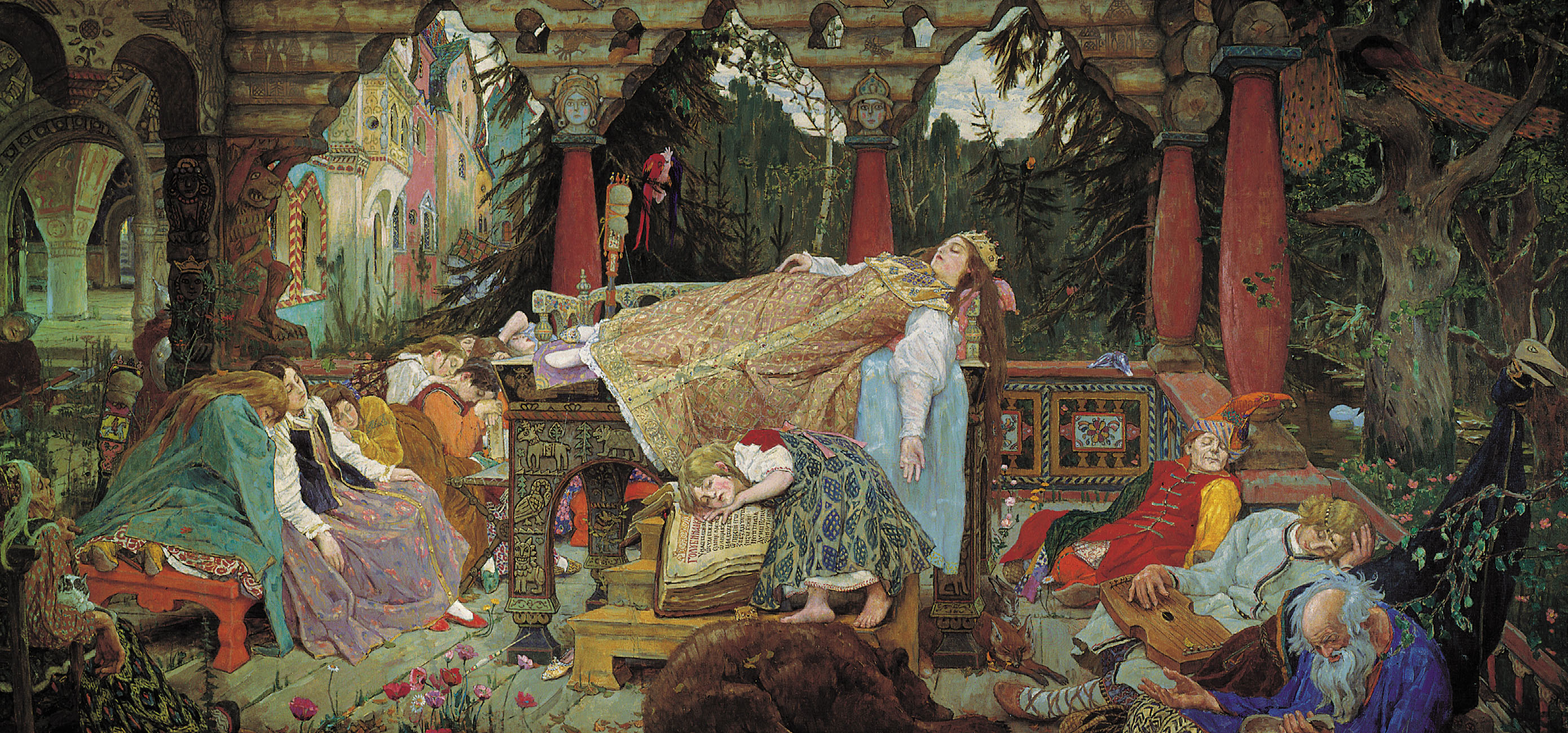
Sleeping Princess by Viktor Vasnetsov

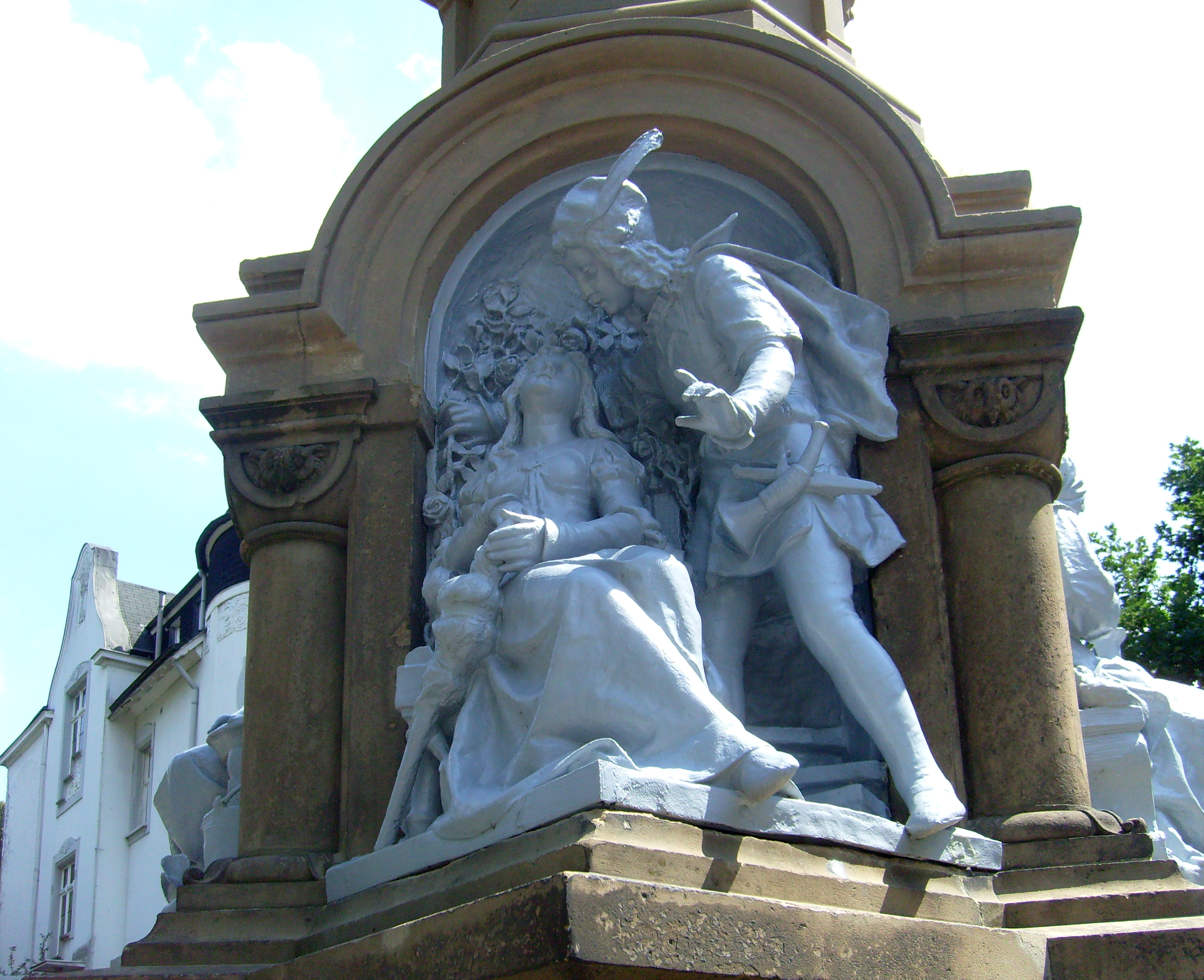
Sleeping Beauty, statue in Wuppertal – Germany

== See also ==
- The Glass Coffin
- Princess Aubergine
- Rip Van Winkle
- Sleeping Beauty problem, a mathematical puzzle based on the fairy tale
- The Sleeping Prince (fairy tale)
- Snow White
