= Chalice (novel) =

2008 novel by Robin McKinley

- Author: Robin McKinley
- Language: English
- Genre: Fantasy
- Publisher: Putnam Juvenile
- Publication date: September 18, 2008
- Media type: Print (Hardcover)
- Pages: 272
- ISBN: 978-0-399-24676-0
- OCLC: 213079096
- LC Class: PZ7.M1988 Ch 2008

Chalice is a fantasy novel by American writer Robin McKinley. It was published in 2008 by G. P. Putnam's Sons.

== Themes and setting ==
Although McKinley does not explain the situation in detail, the book indicates that the country is divided into demesnes, each one with a Master, and that Master's Circle (The Master is part of the Circle). There is an Overlord over all of the demesnes. The Circle's task is to maintain the stability of the land, including the housing and health of the human and non-human inhabitants, and of the land itself. They do this by tending to the earthlines, apparently zones of importance in maintaining order. If the earthlines are disturbed, or not maintained, there may be disease, fire, deterioration of buildings and fences, and sickness of humans and animals. Each Circle has twelve members, each with a title, Chalice and Master being two of those titles. Chalices seem to always be female. Some of the officers of the Circle where the action in Chalice takes place are male, some female. Circle members usually have apprentices. Replacement of Circle members, often by their apprentices, is by divination, which seems to be supernaturally guided, and is usually carried out by the Prelate, a Circle member, who uses rods to select new members. The Grand Seneschal is another important member of the Circle. The Master has the most power, the Chalice next, and the Grand Seneschal is third in power and ability to take care of the land. Other circle members include the Clearseer, Talisman, Weather Augury, Prelate, Landsman, and Oakstaff. The demesne where the story takes place is Willowlands.

Mastership is usually hereditary. In cases where that is not possible, and a new Master is brought in from another demesne, the Master and his demesne, and its people, may not achieve stability for generations.

There is an established religion, with three types of priests, those of Earth, Air and Fire, but no description of the practices of this religion.

== Plot summary ==
Chalice is welcoming a new Master. The Chalice must be the first to greet the new Master.

The reason for a new Master is that the old one, and the former Chalice, died in a fire, which was caused by some of their own actions, a few months earlier. The now-dead Master was concerned only with his own pleasure and power, and neglected his duties to his demesne. Seven years before the story begins, the Master sent his brother away, to join the priests of Fire. The brother had been concerned about the demesne, and opposed the Master's ways. When the older brother died, the Grand Seneschal sent for the younger brother, asking that he become the new Master. The brother is welcomed by the Circle, and the people of the demesne, but has changed, physically and mentally, so that he can hardly interact with the people of the demesne at all.

Mirasol, the Chalice, was a peasant, living by herself in a cottage within walking distance of the House of the demesne, but having nothing to do with its inhabitants, until, to everyone's surprise, she was chosen as Chalice. She raises bees, left to her by her dead parents. The bees are special. For a period of time, they produced so much honey that Mirasol couldn't take care of it. They are larger than normal bees, they seem to understand the Chalice, and protect her, and they produce special types of honey. The Chalice has had no training for the job. She has read every manuscript she can find that tells her what a Chalice must do, and how, but there is a lot she doesn't know. She thinks that the rest of the Circle, especially the Grand Seneschal, believes that she was a bad choice. She performs her job as best she can, operating from what she has read, and from her intuition, in deciding what vessel to use, and what to put in it, for each occasion. She mixes honey with the various drinks she offers to people involved in ceremonies of the Circle, or to pour out. This use of honey is new. It has never been used this way before.

During the seven days between the supposed insult and the time of the combat, the Chalice repairs as many of the earthlines of the demesne as possible. (She later learns that the Master has been helping her in this.) On the day of the combat, she returns to the House, to see that the Master will be forced to fight with swords, and has decided that his demesne would be better off if he was killed. But the Chalice's amazing bees have something to say about this. They blanket the combatants, kill the heir, and transform the Master back to near normalcy. Many of the bees die in the process. The Overlord departs in defeat. Some of the Circle resign their positions, because they haven't supported the Master. By the end of the book, it is clear that the Chalice and the Master will marry, and everyone live happily every after.
