= The Hero and the Crown =

1984 novel by Robin McKinley

- Book cover
- Author: Robin McKinley
- Language: English
- Genre: Fantasy novel
- Publisher: Greenwillow Books/William Morrow and Company
- Publication date: 1984
- Publication place: United States
- Media type: Print (Hardback & paperback)
- Pages: 227 pp
- ISBN: 0-441-32809-1
- OCLC: 17421714
- LC Class: PZ7.M1988 He 1985
- Followed by: The Blue Sword

The Hero and the Crown is a fantasy novel written by Robin McKinley and published by Greenwillow Books in 1984. It is the winner of the 1985 Newbery Medal award. This story focuses on "Aerin Dragon-Killer", also known as "Aerin Firehair", the heroine who is introduced as a legendary character in The Blue Sword. The book narrates Aerin's evolution from the shy, retiring daughter of the King of Damar to the heroic queen who protects her people from the demonic Northerners.

== Plot summary ==
=== Part one ===
Aerin is the only child of Arlbeth, king of Damar, and his second wife. Aerin inherits her mother's pale skin and fiery red hair, setting her apart from all other Damarians and causing her to be feared and ostracized. Her particular nemesis at court is Galanna, a beautiful but vain young woman, who spread rumors that Aerin's mother was a witch and that Aerin is illegitimate. Galanna taunts Aerin for having failed to develop the Gift, known as kelar, an ability to use magic that all members of the royal family inherit to some degree. During one of their regular fights, Galanna convinces Aerin to eat the leaves of the surka plant, which is poisonous to all those not of royal blood. While eating the surka plant does not kill Aerin, it makes her extremely ill.

During her recovery, Aerin stumbles upon a book about the history of Damar and the enormous dragons of old that used to terrorize it, of which only much smaller relatives still exist. Seeking privacy in the pasture of her father's now-injured war horse, Talat, Aerin reads through the book while forging a friendship with the stubborn and proud horse. At the back of the book she finds a recipe for kenet, an ointment meant to protect the wearer from the effects of fire. While experimenting with the ointment, she also trains herself on mounted combat with Talat. Eventually, she sneaks off to slay a small dragon that has been terrorizing a village. Her success earns her some minor notoriety and requests for assistance from other villages. In the meantime, trouble comes from the north, in the form of one of the western barons, Nyrlol, who threatens civil war.

=== Part two ===
Arlbeth fears that the Hero's Crown, an item of power, has finally fallen into the hands of the demonic Northerners, and that Nyrlol's madness is a symptom of their growing power. He is forced to ride west with many of his court, including Tor (his male heir and Aerin's only friend), to deal with Nyrlol, but denies Aerin's request to join him. However, just as Arlbeth prepares to ride north, a messenger arrives bearing news that the last of great dragons, Maur, has reappeared and is terrorizing Damar. Arlbeth has no choice but to deal with Nyrlol first. But Aerin, having been left behind, decides to fight Maur on her own.

After a tremendous battle, Aerin narrowly defeats Maur, claiming as her trophy a red stone left behind when his body burns itself to ashes. Aerin is severely injured but manages to drag herself onto Talat, who carries her home. Maur's skull is brought to the castle as a trophy but its presence seems to taunt Aerin and her health does not improve. In her declining state, Aerin dreams of a blond man by a lake who beckons her to come to him so that he may help her. Aerin leaves Tor a note and rides off on Talat to find this man, Luthe.

Luthe, a sorcerer, heals Aerin by placing her in the Lake of Dreams, which causes her to become "no longer quite mortal". Luthe teaches her some magic and Aerin learns that it is the kelar that gives the royal family their magical abilities. Luthe then reveals that Aerin's mother and uncle, Agsded, along with Luthe, were students of a master mage. Agsded was the best student but used his abilities for evil. A prophecy foretold that one of Agsded's own blood would defeat him; in fear, Aerin's mother fled to the south to have a child (Aerin) with Arlbeth. When Aerin is fully recovered, Luthe sends her north with the dragon's red bloodstone and Gonturan, The Blue Sword, to challenge Agsded.

As she travels, Aerin is joined by armies of foltsza (large mountain cats) and yerigs (large wild dogs). After an extensive magical battle in which Agsded is eventually defeated and the Hero's Crown is recovered, Aerin is rescued by Luthe, who escorts Aerin back as far as his lake on her way home. They become romantically involved; Aerin leaves him but promises to return one day, as they are both immortal.

She returns to find the kingdom losing a battle with the Northern demons. Using Gonturan and her army of foltsza and yerigs, and giving the Hero's Crown to Tor, she helps defeat the Northerners, but at the cost of many lives, including Arlbeth's. Aerin, with Tor's help, finally rids the kingdom of Maur's evil skull, but in the process the skull turns Damar into a desert. Aerin marries Tor, whom she truly loves in her own way, and they help rebuild the kingdom together as its rulers.

== Characters ==
Aerin
The "Sol," or the King's closest female heir, she is King Arlbeth's daughter. Aerin is shunned because of her foreign looks and the rumor that her mother was a witch who ensnared her father so she could bear an heir with noble blood. Despite having virtually no friends and being distant from her father, Aerin gradually earns acceptance with her dragon-slaying, skill with horses, and knowledge of how to make the ointment kenet, which makes the wearer fireproof. This character appears in brief, ghostly form in The Blue Sword.
Luthe
An immortal sorcerer who teaches Aerin much about her Gift and her family as he heals her from her encounter with the dragon Maur. He dips her in the Lake of Dreams, making her "not-quite-mortal," and falls in love with her. This character also appears in The Blue Sword.
Maur
An evil dragon terrorizing Damar.
Tor
The "sola", or male heir to the throne, he is Aerin's only friend and loves her dearly.
Galanna
Beautiful, small, and vindictive, she and her lover Perlith are Aerin's chief enemies at court.
Agsded
An evil wizard who is also Aerin's uncle.

== Genre and style ==
The Hero and the Crown was part of a shift in young adult fantasy in the late 20th century: "a sudden flowering of heroines", according to a 2016 history of the genre. In earlier works of high fantasy, female characters were often absent or relegated to minor roles, and it was perceived as unrealistic for women to play a dominant role in a medieval world. This notion was challenged in the 1970s and 1980s, when authors such as Patricia McKillip, Robin McKinley and Tamora Pierce entered the fantasy genre. (Note: Several scholars regard the 1980s as when this shift began, citing Robin McKinley's Damar tales (1982–1984) and Tamora Pierce's Alanna (1983) as among its exemplars, but Michael Levy and Farah Mendlesohn trace its origin further back to Patricia McKillip's The Forgotten Beasts of Eld (1974).) According to scholars, their writings were influenced by the second-wave feminist movement of the previous decade.

McKinley said in her Newbery Medal speech that she had "wished desperately for books like Hero when I was young, books that didn't require me to be untrue to my gender if I wished to fantasize about having my sort of adventures". She was influenced by the heroic quests of J. R. R. Tolkien, but felt disappointed by the women in his work with the exception of Éowyn, a character who disguises herself as a man to be able to fight. McKinley's protagonist Aerin is not a traditionally beautiful princess, but an athletic one; she engages in outdoor activities, in particular riding horses. Through Aerin's bond with a horse named Talat, the story features the motif of a tomboyish female lead with an animal companion, a recurring trait in McKinley's work. The Damar tales have been described as "feminized quests" as they blend female leads with conventionally masculine quest narratives.

== Reception ==
In a retrospective essay about the Newbery Medal-winning books from 1976 to 1985, literary critic Zena Sutherland wrote, "Long and intermittently intricate, the story impresses by its scope and sweep and by its narrative power rather than by the depth of its characterization; it has many familiar folkloric elements, but they are put together with considerable industry and some panache." In a 2016 essay for Tor.com, novelist Ilana C. Myer wrote, "Ultimately, the world McKinley creates through her inimitable prose, together with a memorable heroine, ensure that The Hero and the Crown remains a fantasy classic."

== Works cited ==
- Campbell, Lori M. (2014). "Introduction". A Quest of Her Own: Essays on the Female Hero in Modern Fantasy. McFarland & Company. ISBN 978-1-4766-1763-3.
- Cecire, Maria Sachiko (2019). Re-Enchanted: The Rise of Children's Fantasy Literature in the Twentieth Century. University of Minnesota Press. ISBN 978-1-4529-5943-6. Project MUSE book 72357.
- Egoff, Sheila A. (1988). Worlds Within: Children's Fantasy from the Middle Ages to Today. American Library Association. ISBN 978-0-8389-0494-7.
- Fry, Michele (2009). "Quest Fantasy". In Reid, Robin Anne (ed.). Women in Science Fiction and Fantasy. Vol. 2. Greenwood Press. ISBN 978-0-313-33592-1.
- Greenlaw, M. Jean (1995). "Fantasy". In Silvey, Anita (ed.). Children's Books and Their Creators. Houghton Mifflin. ISBN 978-0-395-65380-7.
- Keeling, Kara K.; Sprague, Marsha M. (2009). "Dragon-Slayer vs. Dragon-Sayer: Reimagining the Female Fantasy Heroine" (PDF). The ALAN Review. 36 (3): 13–17. doi:10.21061/alan.v36i3.a.2.
- Levy, Michael; Mendlesohn, Farah (2016). Children's Fantasy Literature: An Introduction. Cambridge University Press. doi:10.1017/cbo9781139087421. ISBN 978-1-139-08742-1.
- MacRae, Cathi Dunn (1998). Presenting Young Adult Fantasy Fiction. Twayne Publishers. ISBN 978-0-8057-8220-2.
- Perry, Evelyn M. (2011). Robin McKinley: Girl Reader, Woman Writer. Scarecrow Press. ISBN 978-0-8108-7744-3.
- Phillips, Leah (2020). "Mythopoeic YA: Worlds of Possibility". In Fitzsimmons, Rebekah; Wilson, Casey Alane (eds.). Beyond the Blockbusters. University Press of Mississippi. ISBN 978-1-4968-2718-0. Project MUSE chapter 2545286.

Awards
Preceded by Dear Mr. Henshaw	Newbery Medal recipient 1985	Succeeded by Sarah, Plain and Tall
