= Sun, Moon, and Talia =

Italian literary fairy tale

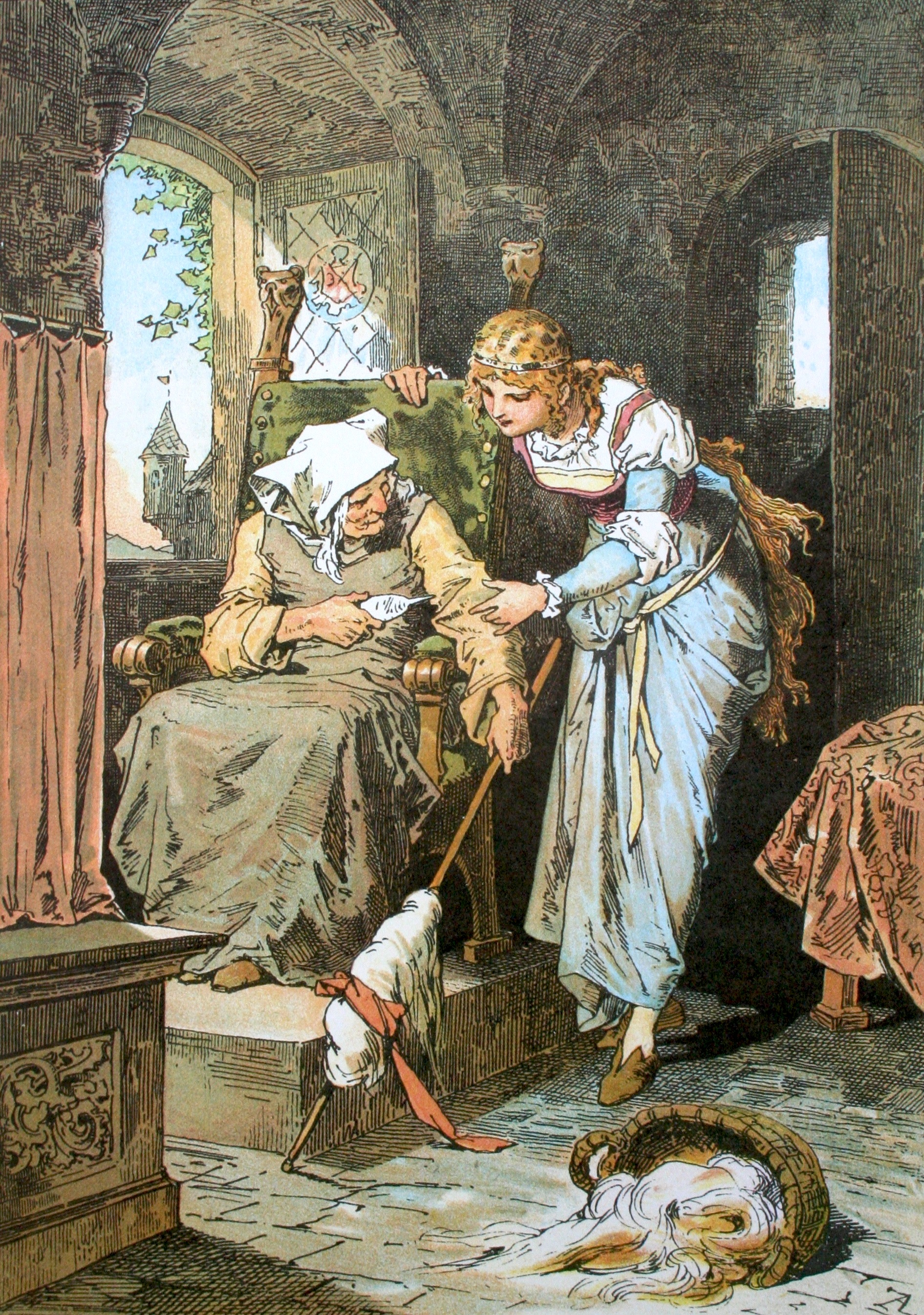
- Talia and the splinter of flax

Folk tale
- Name: Sun, Moon, and Talia
- Country: Italy
- Origin Date: 1634
- Published in: Pentamerone

"Sun, Moon, and Talia" (Italian: Sole, Luna, e Talia) is an Italian literary fairy tale written by Giambattista Basile and published posthumously in the last volume of his 1634-36 work, the Pentamerone. Charles Perrault retold this fairy tale in 1697 as "Sleeping Beauty", as did the Brothers Grimm in 1812 as "Little Briar Rose". The version is best known for its graphic themes of rape and attempted cannibalism.

It is Aarne-Thompson type 410; other tales of this type include The Glass Coffin and The Young Slave.

== Synopsis ==
After the birth of a great lord's daughter, Talia, wise men and astrologers cast the child's horoscope and predicted that Talia would be endangered by a splinter of flax. To protect his daughter, the father commands that no flax would ever be brought into his house. Years later, Talia sees an old woman spinning flax on a spindle. She asks the woman if she can stretch the flax herself, but as soon as she begins to spin, a splinter of flax gets stuck under her fingernail, and she collapses in sleep. Unable to stand the thought of burying his daughter, Talia's father puts his daughter in one of his country estates.

Some time later, a king, who is out hunting in the nearby woodlands, follows his falcon into the house. He finds Talia; overcome by her beauty, he tries unsuccessfully to wake her, and then, "crying aloud, he beheld her charms and felt his blood course hotly through his veins. He lifted her in his arms, and carried her to a bed, where he gathered the first fruits of love." Afterwards, he leaves her on the bed and returns to his own city. Talia becomes pregnant and, after nine months, while still deeply asleep, gives birth to twins—a boy and a girl.

One day, the girl cannot find her mother's breast; instead, she begins to suck her finger and draws the flax splinter out. Talia awakens immediately and names her beloved children Sun and Moon, and lives with them in the house.

The king returns to find Talia awake, revealing to her that he is the father to her twin children. The two fall in love; however, the king is already married, and one night he calls out the names of Talia, Sun, and Moon in his sleep. His wife, the queen, hears him and she forces the king's secretary to tell her everything, and then, using a forged message, has Talia's children brought to court. She orders the cook to kill the children and serve them to the king. But the cook hides them, and goes on to cook two lambs instead. The queen taunts the king while he eats the meal, unaware of the cook's exchange.

Then, the queen brings Talia to court. She commands that a huge fire be lit in the courtyard, and that Talia be thrown into the flames. Talia asks the queen to allow her to take off her fine garments first. The queen agrees. Talia undresses and utters screams of grief with each piece of clothing. The king hears Talia's screams and goes to her, where his wife tells him that Talia will be burned and that he has unknowingly eaten his own children. The king, realizing all the ruse, commands that his wife, his secretary, and the cook be thrown into the fire instead. But the cook explains how he had saved Sun and Moon, and fed the king two lambs instead. Talia and the king marry, and the cook is promoted to royal chamberlain.

The last line of the fairy tale—its moral—is as follows: "He who has luck may go to bed, And bliss will rain upon his head."
