= Sunshine (novel) =

2003 novel by Robin McKinley

- Author: Robin McKinley
- Genre: Fantasy
- Publisher: Berkley Publishing Group
- Publication date: 2003

Sunshine is a fantasy novel featuring vampires written by Robin McKinley and published by Berkley Publishing Group in 2003. Sunshine won the Mythopoeic Fantasy Award for Adult Literature in 2004.

== Plot summary ==
The story is set in an alternate universe, taking place after the "Voodoo Wars", a conflict between humans and the "Others". The Others mainly consist of vampires, werewolves, and demons, though the main conflict occurs between humans and vampires. As a result of this war, "bad spots", or places where black magic thrives, have appeared more frequently.

Rae "Sunshine" Seddon, the pastry-making heroine of the novel, has the misfortune of being caught off-guard at her family's old lake side cabin and is abducted by a gang of vampires. She is confined to the ballroom of an abandoned mansion with Constantine, a vampire shackled there by vampires of a rival gang, led by Constantine's enemy Bo. Bo's intention is to allow Constantine to slowly die of hunger and exposure to sunlight. Rae is brought as bait for him, and the vampires cut her upper chest as temptation. However, Rae not only manages to defy the supposed power that any vampire has over a human, but also uses her all-but-forgotten magical powers of transmutation, taught to her by her grandmother, to effect an escape.

Rae realizes that the magical lineage she has ignored allows her to draw power from the sunlight, ergo transferring her ability through touch to Constantine and allowing him to be under the light of day, so long as contact is maintained. Through this symbiotic relationship, the two of them make an escape.

Despite her best efforts, all does not return to normality once Rae is back home. Her friends and family are shocked by her survival of an encounter with vampires, and over time she both starts to become more affected by the trauma and refuses to tell anyone the circumstances leading to her alliance with a vampire. As it becomes clear that the conflict with Bo and his gang is only beginning, Sunshine begins to embrace her magical ability, is coerced into working with the "Special Other Forces", wonders what kind of tentative partnership can exist between two individuals whose races are bitter enemies, and, finally, works with Constantine to overthrow Bo for good.

== Characters ==
Rae "Sunshine" Seddon: A young woman who works as the baker at a coffee shop called Charlie's Coffeehouse. Born Raven Blaise. Her father, whom her mother left when Sunshine was small, was part of a powerful magic-wielding family.

Sadie, or Mom: Sunshine's mother. She is married to Charlie and also works at the coffeehouse.

Charlie Seddon: Owner of Charlie's Coffeehouse and Sunshine's stepfather.

Constantine: A vampire held in captivity by the same vampires that captured Sunshine. He is somehow different than the other vampires (exactly how is never revealed in the book, although it is clear it has something to do with his eating habits, as the setup with Sunshine is clearly meant to make him drink from and kill her), but he is able to go out in moonlight which most vampires his age cannot.

Mel: The chef at Charlie's and Sunshine's boyfriend. He has a mysterious past about which much is implied, but nothing explained. He is heavily tattooed with wards, which can be dangerous, and used to be part of a motorcycle gang. He and Sunshine have a comfortable "don't ask-don't tell" policy.

Miss Yolande: Sunshine's landlady who turns out to be a talented wardkeeper.

Beauregard ("Bo"): Sunshine and Constantine's mutual enemy. He is a vampire and Constantine's contemporary, and runs a large gang, which is how he captured Sunshine.

Pat: The SOF ("Special Other Forces" or "Sucker Cops") agent to whom Sunshine is closest (several of them are regulars at the coffeehouse). He's 1/4 demon, but keeps this a secret, as it would cost him his job - but the SOF, it's revealed, is riddled with partbloods.

Aimil: librarian, long-time friend of Sunshine's. It is revealed that she's been part-time with the SOF for 20 months. Also a partblood.

== Sequel ==
McKinley, when addressed about the prospect of a sequel to Sunshine, answered: "I'd love to write more about Sunshine — I know quite a bit about what happens to her — but it's not up to me. If you want to nag someone, find the mailing address of the Story Council and nag them to send me the sequel."

In 2008, McKinley said she was planning a novel, tentatively entitled Albion, set in the same universe as Sunshine, but it was never completed.
