= Spindle's End =

2000 retelling of Sleeping Beauty by Robin McKinley

- First edition, 2000
- Author: Robin McKinley
- Cover artist: Daniel Craig
- Language: English
- Series: Folktales
- Genre: Fantasy novel
- Publisher: Putnam Publishing Group
- Publication date: May 2000
- Publication place: United Kingdom
- Media type: Print (Hardcover)
- Pages: 400pp
- ISBN: 0-399-23466-7
- OCLC: 42290485
- LC Class: PZ8.M1793 Sp 2000
- Preceded by: Rose Daughter

Spindle's End is a retelling of Sleeping Beauty by author Robin McKinley, published in 2000.

== Plot summary ==
In McKinley's version of the classic fairy tale, Sleeping Beauty, a wicked fairy named Pernicia appears on the princess' name-day and places a curse on the baby, claiming that the child will, on her 21st birthday, prick her finger on a spindle and fall into deathly sleep. The cursed princess is rescued on her name-day and secretly taken away by a young fairy, Katriona. The two head to Katriona's village, a town called Foggy Bottom, located in the damp and swampy section of the country known as The Gig. There, Katriona and her aunt (affectionately known as Aunt) raise the princess as an ordinary village maiden, naming her Rosie after the last of the princess' twenty-one names.

Throughout the book, Rosie grows from a headstrong, stubborn child into an intelligent and courageous young woman. With the help of a rare talent, beast-speech, a small bit of magic unknowingly passed on from Katriona and the silent encouragement of the town's taciturn blacksmith, Narl, Rosie becomes a talented and well-known horse leech, more inclined to wear breeches and whittle spindle ends than wear dresses and practice embroidery, as her more ladylike friend Peony does. However, when Rosie is 20 years old, Ikor, a mysterious powerful fairy, appears and reveals to Rosie that she is actually the country's hidden princess, and announces a plan to defeat Pernicia: a spell will be cast over Peony and Rosie which switches their identities, but only until Rosie turns 21 and Pernicia's spell is broken.

In addition to the magic that infuses almost every aspect of the book, Spindle's End deals with the importance of family love, especially that between Rosie, Katriona, and Aunt, (and, later, the love between these people and Katriona's husband and children, as the family grows) but also of Rosie's mother, the Queen, who longs for her lost daughter. Peony, Rosie's best friend, has a deep need to be loved and accepted by a family, because her adoptive parents don't care for her in the same way Rosie's adoptive family cares for her.

Animals also play a central role in the book. Animals of various kinds help Katriona get Rosie to The Gig, a journey of about three months, and animals assist in the final defeat of Pernicia.

=== Connection to other works ===
Despite not being a sequel, it is implied that this book is set in the same world as McKinley's Damar books; at one point Damar and the character of Harimad-sol are mentioned as historical events, though from a different country. The events of McKinley's Deerskin are also referenced obliquely, as the Queen, Rosie's mother, is said to come from a country best known for the fleethounds bred by its king and queen.

== Reception ==
F&SF reviewer Charles de Lint praised Spindle's End as "luminescent," characterizing the novel as "one of those rare occasions when the writing is so good, and the novel has so much heart, that the plot almost doesn't matter. That there is a strong storyline only adds to the book's unequivocal success."
