= Edward F. Brewtnall =

English painter (1846–1902)

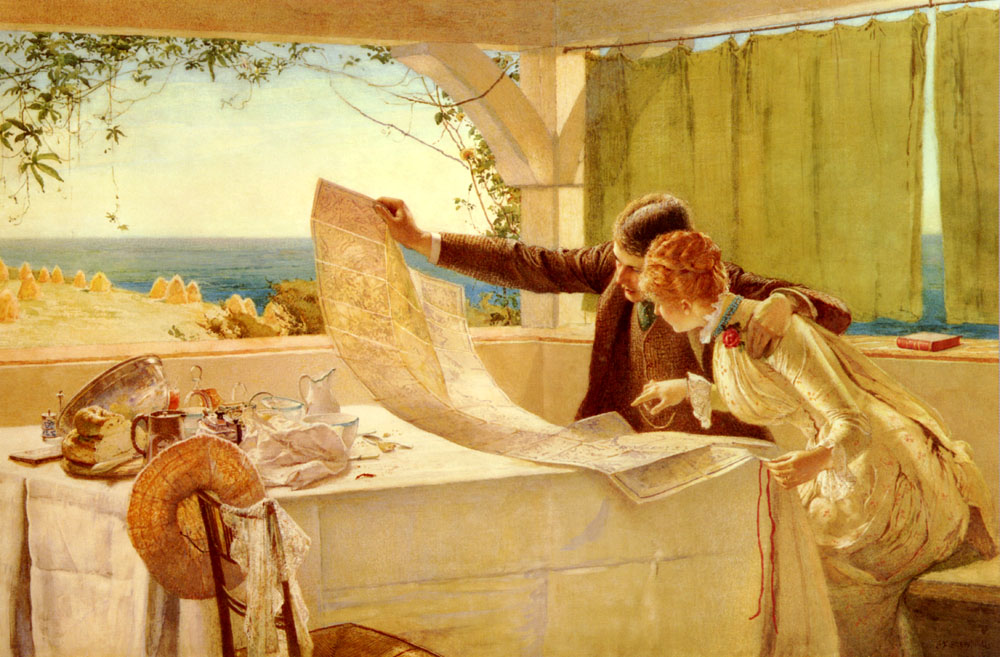
Where next? (1880)

Edward Frederick Brewtnall RWS (London 13 October 1846 – 13 November 1902 London) was a British genre, landscape and figure painter and illustrator.

== Life ==
He was born in London on 13 October 1846. He studied at the Lambeth School of Art.

Based in London, Brewtnall worked in both oil and watercolour, exhibiting, from 1868, at the Royal Academy, Society of British Artists, Grosvenor Gallery and the Royal Watercolour Society (RWS) - he was made a full member of the latter in 1883. He was also a member of the Royal Society of British Artists (RBA) and the Royal Institute of Oil Painters (ROI).

Brewtnall had a particular interest in Folk tales and Ballads which became the subjects of many of his paintings such as "Cinderella", "The Frog Princess" (1880), "Little Red Riding Hood" (1895), "Sleeping Beauty" etc. He provided artwork for The Graphic, Pall Mall Magazine, The Quiver, and English Illustrated Magazine, among other magazines and periodicals, and illustrated books such as Barnard's edition of Bunyan's "Pilgrim's Progress" and others.

== Gallery ==
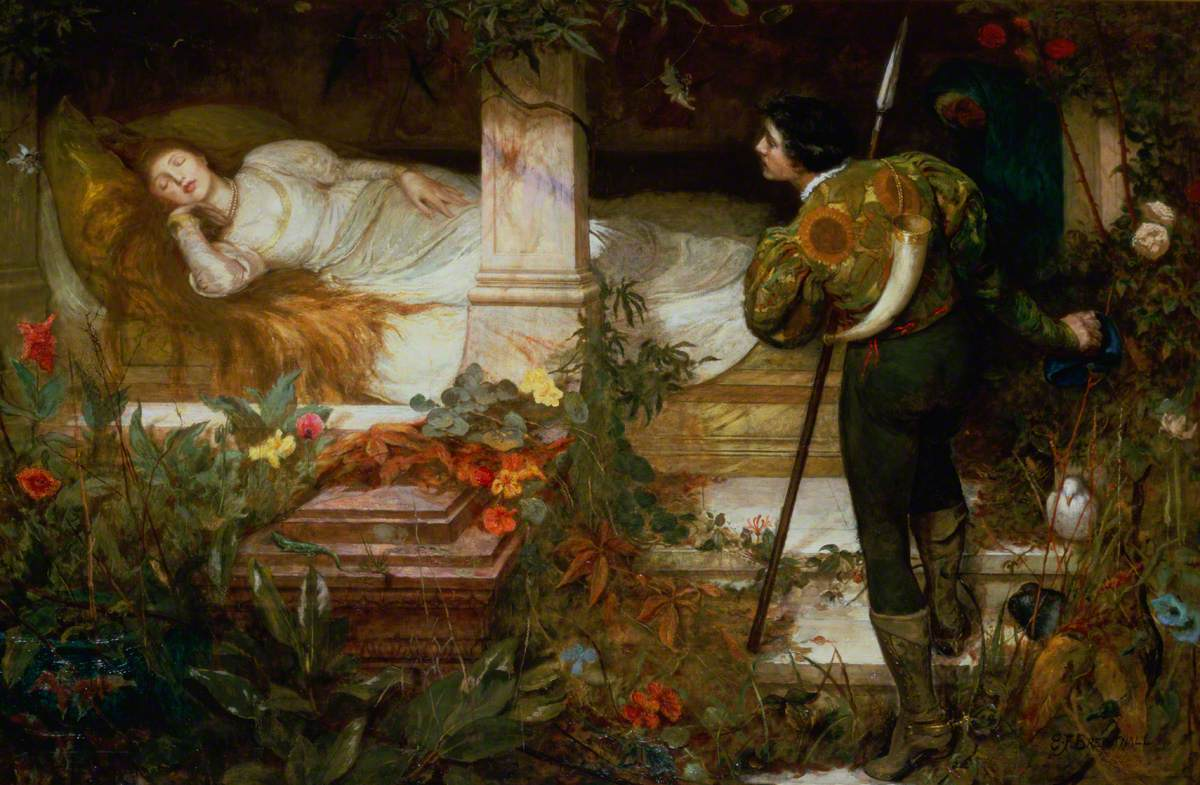
Sleeping Beauty

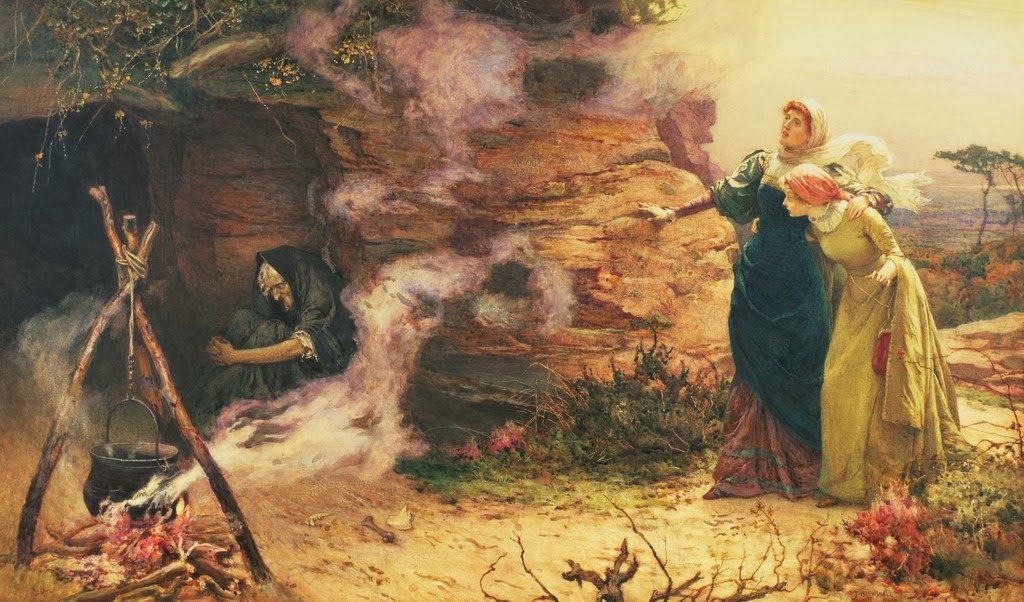
A Visit to the Witch (1882)

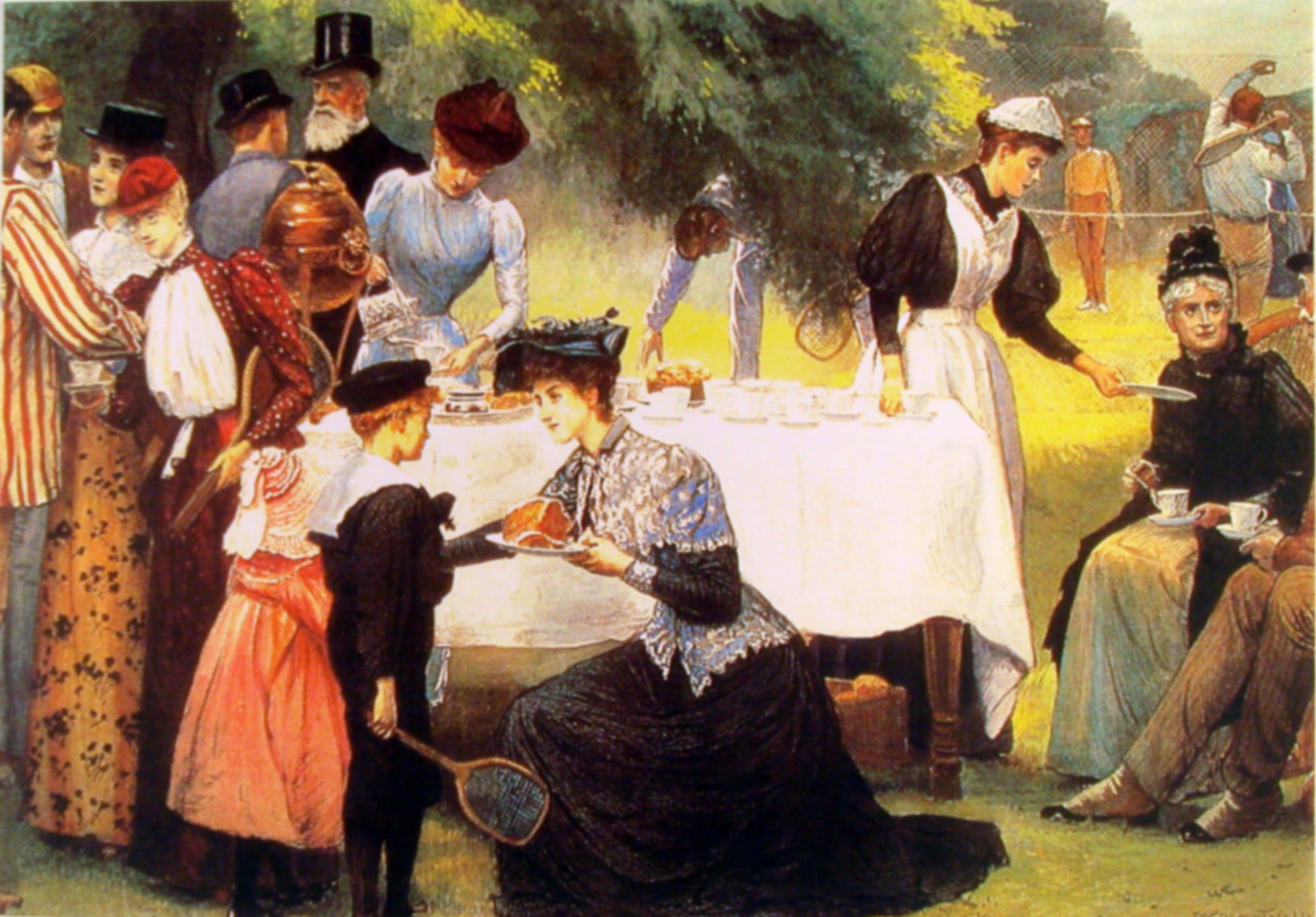
Tea and Tennis (1880)
