= Robin McKinley =

American fantasy writer

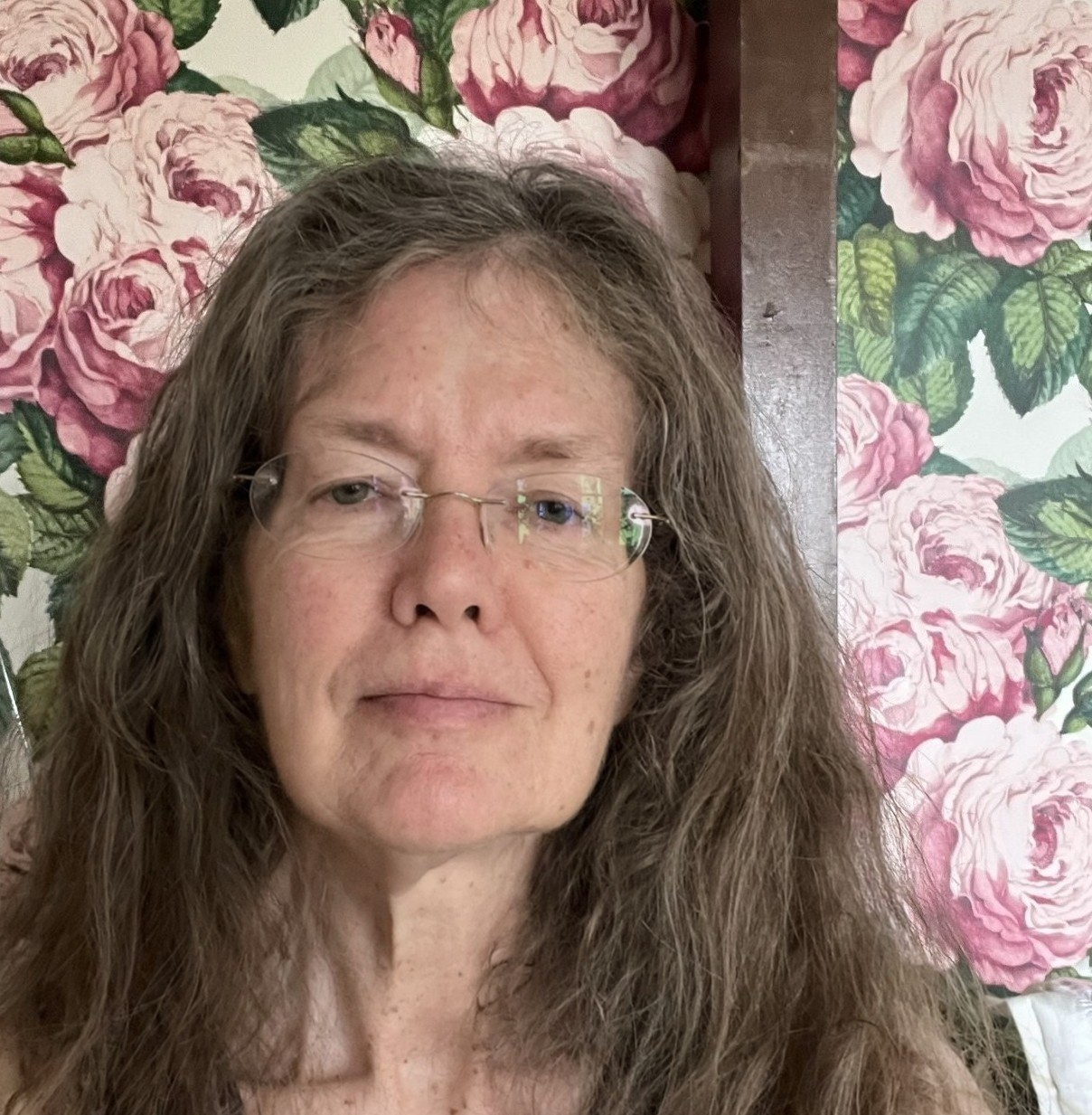
- Robin McKinley
- Born: Jennifer Carolyn Robin McKinley; November 16, 1952 (age 73); Warren, Ohio, U.S.
- Occupation: Writer
- Spouse: Peter Dickinson (m. 1991; died 2015)
- Writing career
- Period: 1978–present
- Genres: Children's fantasy novels, Bildungsroman, fairy tales
- Notable works: The Hero and the Crown; Deerskin; Sunshine; Beauty
- Notable awards: Newbery Medal; 1985; World Fantasy Award; 1986
- Website: robinmckinley.com

Robin McKinley (born November 16, 1952) is an American author best known for her fantasy novels and fairy tale retellings. Her 1984 novel The Hero and the Crown won the Newbery Medal as the year's best new American children's book. In 2022, the Science Fiction and Fantasy Writers Association named her the 39th Damon Knight Memorial Grand Master in recognition of her significant contributions to the literature of science fiction and fantasy.

== Biography ==
Robin McKinley was born as Jennifer Carolyn Robin McKinley on November 16, 1952, in Warren, Ohio. Her father William McKinley was an officer in the United States Navy and her mother Jeanne Turrell McKinley was a teacher. As a result of her father's changing naval posts, McKinley grew up all over the world, including in California, New York, Japan, and Maine. She was educated at Gould Academy, a preparatory school in Bethel, Maine. McKinley went on to attend college, first at Dickinson College in Carlisle, Pennsylvania, in 1970–1972 and later at Bowdoin College in Brunswick, Maine, where she graduated summa cum laude in 1975.

Robin McKinley lives in the United Kingdom. Her husband was author Peter Dickinson; they were married from 1991 until his death in 2015. They had no children, though Dickinson had children from his first marriage.

=== Career ===
After graduating from college, she remained in Maine for several years working as a research assistant and later in a bookstore. During this time, she completed her first book, Beauty: A Retelling of the Story of Beauty and the Beast. It was accepted for publication by the first publisher it was sent to and upon publication immediately pushed McKinley to prominence. The book was named an American Library Association Notable Children's Book and an ALA Best Book for Young Adults.

=== Writing ===
Robin McKinley has written a variety of novels, mostly in the fantasy genre. Several of her novels are her own personal renditions of classic fairy tales with a "feminist twist". These retellings usually feature a strong female protagonist who does not wait to be rescued but instead takes an active role in determining the course of her own life. Beauty and Rose Daughter are both versions of Beauty and the Beast, Spindle's End is the story of Sleeping Beauty, and Deerskin and two of the stories in The Door in the Hedge are based on other folktales. Besides adapting classic fairy tales, McKinley wrote her own rendition of the Robin Hood story in her novel The Outlaws of Sherwood.

McKinley has written two novels set in the imaginary land of Damar, The Blue Sword and The Hero and the Crown. Her contribution to the Imaginary Lands anthology and the stories in A Knot in the Grain are also set there.

Her standalone novels include Sunshine (2003), Dragonhaven (2007), and Shadows (2013).

McKinley says she writes about strong heroines because she feels very strongly about the potential for girls to be "doing things", and she feels that the selection of fantasy literature featuring girls is scarce and unsatisfactory. According to biographer Marilyn H. Karrenbrock, "McKinley's females do not simper; they do not betray their own nature to win a man's approval. But neither do they take love lightly or put their own desires before anything else. In McKinley's books, the romance, like the adventure, is based upon ideals of faithfulness, duty, and honor."

== Awards and honors ==
- 1983 Newbery Honor for The Blue Sword.
- 1985 Newbery Medal for The Hero and the Crown.
- 1986 World Fantasy Award for Best Anthology/Collection for Imaginary Lands, as editor.
- 1998 Phoenix Award Honor Book for Beauty.
- 2004 Mythopoeic Fantasy Award for Adult Literature for Sunshine.
- 2022 Grand Master of the Science Fiction and Fantasy Writers Association

== Works ==
=== Children's picture books ===
- Rowan (1992), Illustrated by Donna Ruff
- My Father Is in the Navy (1992), Illustrated by Martine Gourbalt
- The Stone Fey (1998), Illustrated by John Clapp

=== Adaptations ===
- Black Beauty Storybook Edition (1986), Illustrated by Susan Jeffers. Originally by Anna Sewell (1877)
- The Light Princess (1988), Illustrated by Katie Thamer Treheme. Chapter book. Originally by George MacDonald (1864)
- Tales from the Jungle Book (1985), Illustrated by Jos. A. Smith. Contains versions of "Kaa's Hunting", "Mowgli's Brothers", "Tiger! Tiger!" retold by McKinley and based on the short stories by Rudyard Kipling in The Jungle Book (1894).

=== Standalone novels ===
- Beauty: A Retelling of the Story of Beauty and the Beast (1978)
- The Outlaws of Sherwood (1988)
- Deerskin (1993)
- Rose Daughter (1997)
- Spindle's End (2000)
- Sunshine (2003)
- Dragonhaven (2007)
- Chalice (2008)
- Pegasus (2010)
- Shadows (2013)

=== Novels in series ===
==== Damar ====
- The Blue Sword (1982)
- The Hero and the Crown (1984)

Short stories set in Damar include: "The Healer" (1982), "The Stagman" (1984), "The Stone Fey" (1998), "A Pool in the Desert" (2004)

=== Collections ===
- The Door in the Hedge (1981)
  - "The Stolen Princess"
  - "The Princess and the Frog"
  - "The Hunting of the Hind"
  - "The Twelve Dancing Princesses"
- Imaginary Lands (1986), editor and contributor
  - "Paper Dragons", by James P. Blaylock
  - "The Old Woman and the Storm" by Patricia A. McKillip
  - "The Big Rock Candy Mountain" by Robert Westall
  - "Flight" by Peter Dickinson
  - "Evian Steel" by Jane Yolen
  - "Stranger Blood" by P. C. Hodgell
  - "The Curse of Igamor" by Michael de Larrabeiti
  - "Tam Lin" by Joan D. Vinge
  - "The Stone Fey" by Robin McKinley
- A Knot in the Grain and Other Stories (1994)
  - "The Healer"
  - "The Stagman"
  - "Touk's House"
  - "Buttercups"
  - "A Knot in the Grain"
- Water: Tales of Elemental Spirits (2004), by Peter Dickinson and Robin McKinley
  - Prologue: The Water Sprite by Robin McKinley and Peter Dickinson
  - "The Mermaid Song" by Peter Dickinson
  - "The Sea-King's Son" by Robin McKinley
  - "Sea Serpent" by Peter Dickinson
  - "Water Horse" by Robin McKinley
  - "Kraken" by Peter Dickinson
  - "A Pool in the Desert" by Robin McKinley
- Fire: Tales of Elemental Spirits (2009), by Peter Dickinson and Robin McKinley
  - "Phoenix" by Peter Dickinson
  - "Hellhound" by Robin McKinley
  - "Firework" by Peter Dickinson
  - "Salamander Man" by Peter Dickinson
  - "First Flight" by Robin McKinley

(Note: Earth and Air (2012), the third collection in the Elemental Spirits series, was written entirely by Peter Dickinson.)

=== Other collections to which she has contributed ===
- Elsewhere, Volume II (1982), edited by Terri Windling and Mark Alan Arnold, with "The Healer"
- Elsewhere, Volume III (1984), edited by Terri Windling and Mark Alan Arnold, with "The Stagman"
- Faery! (1985), edited by Terri Windling, with "Touk's House"
- Dragons and Warrior Daughters: Fantasy Stories by Women Writers (1989), edited by Jessica Yates, with "The Healer"
- Masterpieces of Fantasy and Wonder (1989) edited by David G. Hartwell, with "The Princess and the Frog"
- Spells of Enchantment: The Wondrous Fairy Tales of Western Culture (1991), edited by Jack D. Zipes, with "The Princess and the Frog"
- Silver Birch, Blood Moon (The Snow White, Blood Red Anthology Series # 5), 1999, edited by Ellen Datlow and Teri Windling, with "Marsh-Magic"
- The Year's Best Fantasy and Horror: Sixteenth Annual Collection (2003), edited by Ellen Datlow and Terri Windling, with "A Pool in the Desert"
- Lightspeed Magazine, Issue 45 (February 2014), edited by John Joseph Adams, with "Hellhound"

=== Nonfiction ===
==== Book introductions ====
- Imaginary Lands (1986)
- Oz: The Hundredth Anniversary Celebration (2000) by Peter Glassman
- The Phoenix and the Carpet (Five Children # 2; originally published 1904; published with introduction 2012), by E. Nesbit

== Works cited ==
- Crew, Hilary S. (1994). "McKinley, (Jennifer Carolyn) Robin". In Berger, Laura Standley (ed.). Twentieth-Century Young Adult Writers. St. James Press. ISBN 978-1-55-862202-9.
- Hearne, Betsy (2015). "McKinley, Robin". In Zipes, Jack (ed.). The Oxford Companion to Fairy Tales (2nd ed.). Oxford University Press. doi:10.1093/acref/9780199689828.001.0001. ISBN 978-0-19-968982-8.
- Karrenbrock, Marilyn H. (1986). "Robin McKinley". In Estes, Glenn E. (ed.). Dictionary of Literary Biography. Vol. 52. Gale. ISBN 978-0-8103-1730-7.
- Perry, Evelyn M. (2011). Robin McKinley: Girl Reader, Woman Writer. Scarecrow Press. ISBN 978-0-8108-7744-3.
- Sutherland, Zena (1986). "Newbery Medal Books". In Lee, Kingman (ed.). Newbery and Caldecott Medal Books, 1976-1985. The Horn Book. ISBN 978-0-87675-004-9.
- Tchana, Katrin (1995). "McKinley, Robin". In Silvey, Anita (ed.). Children's Books and Their Creators. Houghton Mifflin. ISBN 978-0-395-65380-7.
