= The Glass Coffin =

German fairy tale

Folk tale
- Name: The Glass Coffin
- Aarne–Thompson grouping: ATU 410
- Country: Germany
- Published in: Grimms' Fairy Tales

"The Glass Coffin" is a German fairy tale collected by the Brothers Grimm, tale number 163. Andrew Lang included it in The Green Fairy Book as The Crystal Coffin.

It is Aarne-Thompson type 410, Sleeping Beauty. Another variant is The Young Slave.

== Synopsis ==
A tailor's apprentice became lost in a forest. When night came, he saw a light shining and followed it to a hut. An old man lived there and, after the tailor begged, allowed him to stay for the night. In the morning, the tailor awoke to witness a fight between a great stag and a wild boar. After the stag won, it bounded up to him and carried him off in its antlers. It set him down before a wall of stone and pushed him against a door in it, which then opened. Inside the door, he was told to stand on a stone, which would bring him good fortune. He did so, and it sank down into a great hall, where the voice directed him to look into a glass chest. The chest contained a beautiful maiden, who asked him to open the chest and free her, and he did so.

The maiden told him her story: She was the daughter of a rich count, and after the death of her parents, she had been raised by her brother. One day, a traveler stayed the night and used magic to get to her in the night, to ask her to marry him. She found the use of magic repellent and rejected his proposal. In revenge the magician then turned her brother into the stag, imprisoned her in the glass chest (coffin), and enchanted all the lands around them.

The tailor and the maiden emerged from the enchanted hall and found that the stag had been transformed back into her brother. The wild boar he had killed had been the magician. The tailor and the maiden then married.

== Analysis ==
The Glass Coffin has been compared to Snow White, which shares the motif of the woman inside a glass coffin.

“The Glass Coffin” first appeared in the 1837 collection of the Grimms’ fairy tales. It is not a collected folktale like others in the collection. Instead, the Brothers Grimm adapted it from a section in the 1728 novel Das verwöhnte Mütter-Söhngen by Sylvanus. They considered it to have “some affinity to a genuine saga.”

== See also ==
- The Golden Stag
- The Queen Bee
