= Beauty: A Retelling of the Story of Beauty and the Beast =

1978 novel by Robin McKinley

- First edition
- Author: Robin McKinley
- Language: English
- Genre: Fantasy
- Publication date: 25 October 1978
- Media type: Print
- ISBN: 978-0-06-024149-0
- OCLC: 4037372
- Dewey Decimal: 813/.5/4 398.2
- LC Class: PZ8.M1793 Be 1978

Beauty: A Retelling of the Story of Beauty and the Beast is a 1978 novel written by author Robin McKinley. It was her debut book, retelling the classic French fairy tale La Belle et La Bete. Almost 20 years later, McKinley returned to the same material with her 1997 novel Rose Daughter. Beauty was the 1998 Phoenix Award honor book. It was the 1966 -1988 Best of the Best Books for Young Adults.

An unabridged audio-book recording was released by Recorded Books in 2013, narrated by Charlotte Parry, and is currently available via Audible.com.

== Plot ==
Roderick Huston, a wealthy merchant and widower, has three daughters: Grace, Hope, and Honour. When Honour was a child, she said she preferred the name Beauty. As she grows older, Honour feels the nickname is increasingly ill-fitting, as she remains plain while her sisters become lovelier and more socially adept. When the family's fortunes take a turn for the worse, they are forced to move to the small town of Blue Hill.

A year later, they receive news of one of Huston's ships arriving back into port. Huston leaves the next day, but not before asking his daughters if they want any gifts. Grace and Hope jokingly ask for jewelry and dresses, while Beauty asks for a rose cutting or seeds, as none grow in the countryside.

Huston returns home with a beautiful rose and saddlebags filled with treasure. He explains that on his way home through the forest, he became lost in a storm, and happened across a mysterious castle. Inside, he was given shelter and waited on by invisible servants. As he was leaving the next day, he found a beautiful rose garden and plucked a single rose for Beauty. The owner of the castle, a terrifying beast, appeared, furious that Huston would steal from him after his hospitality. The Beast agreed to let him go on the condition that one of his daughters must return and live in the castle. Despite her family's pleas, Beauty insists that she go.

Beauty comes to enjoy living in the castle. She grows close to the Beast, enjoying walks and talks together and spending time in the castle's enormous library, but cannot bring herself to love him and refuses his marriage proposal every night. She also dreams every night of her family in vivid detail and tries to decipher clues about the Beast's past when she slowly starts to hear the voices of the two invisible maids who wait on her. When Beauty becomes homesick, the Beast shows her a magic mirror that allows her to see her family. Beauty begs to visit her home, promising to return in a week and stay with the Beast forever afterwards. The Beast reluctantly allows her to go.

When Beauty arrives home, her family is overjoyed, but quickly become disheartened when they learn she's leaving again. During the days without the Beast, Beauty begins to recognize how she truly feels about him. At her family's pleading she agrees to stay a while longer, but quickly rushes back to the castle when she has a dream about the Beast dying. Beauty discovers him nearly dead. Realizing her true feelings, she confesses her love and tells him that she will marry him. In an instant the Beast returns to his human form, explaining to Beauty about a curse on his family's lineage and how it could only be broken by someone loving him despite his appearance. He shows Beauty her reflection, revealing how she has blossomed into a true beauty. Beauty is reunited with her family and she and the Beast start their new lives together.

== Review ==
A review in The Guardian said "It's great to have this lovely retelling published in Britain at last."

Jo Walton, writing for Tor, called Beauty "deeply enjoyable" and "a warm, open book where everyone is sympathetic". She compared and contrasted Beauty with Rose Daughter, noting that while Rose Daughter was a more technically proficient novel with superior world-building, she personally preferred Beauty.
