= Robert Holdstock bibliography =

This is a bibliography of fantasy author Robert Holdstock.

== Fiction ==
=== Short stories ===
- Pauper's Plot, 1969
- Microcosm, 1972
- Ash, Ash, 1974 (also published under the title Ashes)
- The Graveyard Cross, 1976
- Magic Man, 1976
- On the Inside, 1976
- The Time Beyond Age, 1976
- Travellers, 1976
- A Small Event, 1977
- The Touch of a Vanished Hand, 1977
- In the Valley of the Statues, 1979
- Earth And Stone, 1980
- Mythago Wood, 1981 (novella)
- Where Time Winds Blow, 1981
- The Phantom of the Valley, 1981
- Manchanged, 1981
- Walking on the Shores of Time, 1981
- Elite: The Dark Wheel, 1984 (A novella based upon the computer game Elite by David Braben and Ian Bell)
- The Boy who Jumped Rapids, 1984
- Thorn, 1986
- Scarrowfell, 1987
- The Shapechanger, 1989
- Time of the Tree, 1989
- The Bone Forest, 1991
- The Ragthorn, 1991 (co-authored with Garry Kilworth)
- The Silvering, 1992
- Infantasm, 1995

=== Novelizations of screenplays ===
- Legend of the Werewolf, 1976 (under pseudonym Robert Black)
- The Satanists, 1977 (not filmed; under pseudonym Robert Black)
- The Emerald Forest, 1985

=== Other novels ===
- Eye Among the Blind, 1976
- Earthwind, 1977
- Where Time Winds Blow, 1982
- In the Valley of the Statues, 1982 (short story collection)
- Ancient Echoes, 1996

=== Berserker series ===
(under pseudonym Chris Carlsen)

- Shadow of the Wolf, 1977
- The Bull Chief, 1979
- The Horned Warrior, 1979

=== Francoise Jeury series ===
- Necromancer, 1978
- The Fetch, 1991 (also published under the title Unknown Regions)

=== Raven series ===
(under the pseudonym Richard Kirk)

- Swordsmistress of Chaos, 1978 (volume one co-authored with Angus Wells)
- A Time of Ghosts, 1978 (volume two)
- Lords of the Shadows, 1979 (volume four)

(Holdstock did not write volume three or five in this series)

=== The Professionals series ===
(under the pseudonym Ken Blake)

- Cry Wolf, 1981
- Operation Susie, 1982
- The Untouchables, 1982
- You'll be All Right, 1982

(Other "Ken Blake" books in the series were written by Ken Bulmer)

=== Night Hunter series ===
(under the pseudonym Robert Faulcon)

- The Stalking, 1983
- The Talisman, 1983
- The Ghost Dance, 1984
- The Shrine, 1984
- The Hexing, 1984
- The Labyrinth, 1988

=== Ryhope Wood series ===
- Mythago Wood, 1984
- Lavondyss, 1988
- The Bone Forest, 1991 (novella and short story collection)
- The Hollowing, 1993
- Merlin's Wood, 1994 (novel and two short stories only published in the UK)
- Gate of Ivory, Gate of Horn, 1997
- Avilion, 2009

=== Merlin Codex series ===
- Celtika, 2001
- The Iron Grail, 2002
- The Broken Kings, 2007

== Non-fiction ==
- Alien Landscapes, 1979 (co-authored with Malcolm Edwards)
- Space Wars: Worlds & Weapons, 1979 (under the pseudonym Steven Eisler)
- Alien World: The Complete Illustrated Guide, (under the pseudonym Steven Eisler)
- Tour of the Universe: The Journey of a Lifetime, 1980 (co-authored with Malcolm Edwards)
- Magician: The Lost Journals of the Magus Geoffrey Carlyle, 1982 (co-authored with Malcolm Edwards)
- Realms of Fantasy, 1983 (co-authored with Malcolm Edwards)
- Lost Realms, 1985 (co-authored with Malcolm Edwards)
- Encyclopedia of Science Fiction, 1978 (Consulting Editor)

== Edited anthologies ==
- Stars of Albion, 1979 (co-edited with Christopher Priest)

=== Other Edens series ===
- Other Edens, 1987 (co-edited with Christopher Evans)
- Other Edens II, 1988 (co-edited with Christopher Evans)
- Other Edens III, 1989 (co-edited with Christopher Evans)
