= The Beginning Place =

1980 novel by Ursula K. Le Guin

- First edition cover
- Author: Ursula K. Le Guin
- Cover artist: Griesbach Kroeber
- Language: English
- Genre: Fantasy
- Publisher: Harper and Row
- Publication date: 1980
- Publication place: United States
- Media type: Print (hardback)
- Pages: 183
- ISBN: 0-06-012573-X
- OCLC: 5605039
- Dewey Decimal: 813/.54 19
- LC Class: PS3562.E42 B4 1980

The Beginning Place is a short novel by American writer Ursula K. Le Guin, written in 1980. It was subsequently published under the title Threshold in 1986. The story's genre is a mixture of realism and fantasy literature. The novel's epigraph "What river is this through which the Ganges flows?" is quoted from Jorge Luis Borges.

== Plot summary ==
The narrative focuses on the journey of the two main characters from adolescence to adulthood in two alternate worlds, the real world and the idyllic Tembreabrezi.

The story is told in alternating chapters from two starkly alternating viewpoints: that of Irene Pannis, and of Hugh Rogers. They live in the suburbs of an unnamed US city, in difficult circumstances and with troubled families. They independently discover a place hidden in a local wood, where time flows much more slowly than in the outside world and it is always evening, a "threshold" between their own world and another; though Hugh finds it first within the story, Irene has already been visiting the other world for some years. She has another life there in the town of Tembreabrezi, an adoptive family of sorts, and has learned the local language. Both Irene and Hugh love the "beginning place", the threshold; they feel a sense of belonging and home there that they lack elsewhere in their lives.

As Hugh stumbles upon the beginning place, Irene discovers that something is wrong in Tembreabrezi; the paths which connect the town with the rest of the country are closed somehow, and no one can reach or leave the town except for her. The closing is not material but emotional; the townsfolk are struck by a desperate fear which will not allow them to move beyond the town limits. Despite her anger with Hugh, and her resentment of his disturbance of her hidden sanctuary, they find that they must work together; she has had increasing trouble in passing through the gateway into the other place, while he cannot always cross back into the 'real' world. By travelling together they can pass back and forth through the gateway at will, and so they return to Tembreabrezi together. Hugh is welcomed in the town as the hero for whom they have waited; Irene is jealous, wanting desperately to win the admiration and respect of the townsfolk and especially the Mayor or Master, Sark, whom she has loved for a long time. Hugh is largely unaware of her feelings, but wants to complete the quest to become worthy of the Lord of the Manor's daughter Allia. In the end, they embark together on a mission to save the town and reopen the roads. Together they track down the monster that brings the fear and Hugh kills it. He is injured in the fight, but Irene helps him to keep going until they can reach the gateway back to their own world. On the other side, the trust and the love they have discovered together opens a different sort of gateway, providing them with a possible future together that avoids the destructive patterns of their own families.

== Characters ==
- Hugh Rogers: a 20-year-old large, heavy-bodied man. He is one of the two protagonists of the story.
- Irene Pannis: a young, small-framed woman. She is one of the two protagonists of the story.
- Hugh's mother: emotionally distant and critical of Hugh. She was abandoned by Hugh's father.
- Donna: a checker at a grocery store where Hugh works. Donna is in her mid 40s and has red hair.
- Patsi Sobotny: a young woman who rents a room to Irene in the real world.
- Rick: Patsi's live-in boyfriend.
- Mary Hanson: Irene's mother, overwhelmed by Irene's younger stepsiblings.
- Victor Hansen: Irene's big, handsome, and abusive stepfather.
- Master Dou Sark: a swarthy older man who functions as the Mayor of Mountain Town.
- Sofir: Palizot's husband and a father figure for Irene in Mountain Town.
- Palizot: a mother figure for Irene in Mountain Town.
- Lord Horn: the leader of Mountain Town in Tembreabrezi. Lord Horn is a thin, old, graying man.
- Allia: Lord Horn's blonde daughter.

== Reception ==
Lee Michaels reviewed The Beginning Place for Pegasus magazine and stated that "Ms. LeGuin is too skilled and subtle a writer to have the story end happily ever after, for this is, after all, a real story, but Hugh and Irene have learned to move and to act in the ain country, and it looks in the end as though they will not forget that ability on their return. It seems likely that this ability will be treasure enough for the two of them."

The novel has been subject to critical studies comparing it to C.S. Lewis' The Chronicles of Narnia, Lewis Carroll's Through the Looking-Glass and William Shakespeare's As You Like It.

Michael Moorcock has observed common elements between The Beginning Place and Robert Holdstock's award-winning fantasy novel Mythago Wood; among other similarities, both novels involve alternate worlds and forest settings.

In 2004, Le Guin was awarded the American Library Association's Margaret Edwards Award for young adult literature in part for The Beginning Place (along with her Earthsea novels and The Left Hand of Darkness).

In 2018, the Finnish translation (by Jyrki Iivonen) was nominated for the 2018 Tähtifantasia Award.

== Sources ==
- Cadden, Mike (2005). Ursula K. Le Guin Beyond Genre: Fiction for Children and Adults (1st ed.). New York, NY: Routledge. ISBN 0-415-99527-2.
- Cummins, Elizabeth (2003). Supernatural Fiction Writers (2nd ed.). Charles Scribner's Sons. ISBN 978-0-684-31251-4.
- Franko, Carol. "Acts of Attention at the Borderlands: Le Guin's The Beginning Place Revisited". Extrapolation. 37 (Winter 1996): 302–315.
- Moorcock, Michael (1987). Wizardry and Wild Romance: A study of epic fantasy (1st ed.). London: Victor Gollancz. ISBN 0-575-04147-1.
- Spivack, Charlotte (1984). Ursula K. Le Guin (1st ed.). Boston: Twayne. ISBN 978-0-8057-7430-6.
