= Night Hunter =

Night Hunter may refer to:

== Film ==
- Night Hunter (1996 film), an American horror film
- Night Hunter (2018 film), a Canadian thriller

== Literature ==
- Night Hunter (novel series), six 1983–1988 novels by Robert Faulcon
- Night Hunter, a 1995 novel by Michael Reaves
- Night Hunters, a 1995 novel by Dave Luckett
- The Night Hunter, a 2014 novel by Caro Ramsay
- The Night Hunters, a 1973 novel by Jack Bickham

== Music ==
- "Night Hunter" (song), from the 2009 Air album Love 2
- "Night Hunter", a 1982 song performed by Picture, a Dutch heavy metal band

== Television ==
- "Night Hunters", a 1989 episode of Nature
- "Nighthunters, a 1988 episode of Natural World
- "The Night Hunters", a 2023 episode of Painting with John

== Other uses ==
- Night Hunter, a 1989 computer game by Ubisoft

== See also ==
- Night Huntress, a series of urban fantasy romance novels by Jeaniene Frost
- Night of the Hunter (disambiguation)
