= Night of the Hunter (disambiguation) =

Night of the Hunter may refer to:

== Arts and entertainment ==
=== Books ===
- The Night of the Hunter (novel), a 1953 thriller novel by Davis Grubb
- Night of the Hunter, a 1989 novel by Jennifer Greene
- Night of the Hunter, a 2014 Forgotten Realms novel by R. A. Salvatore

=== Films ===
- The Night of the Hunter (film), a 1955 adaptation of the Grubb novel by Charles Laughton, starring Robert Mitchum
- Night of the Hunter (1991 film), a television film adaption of the Grubb novel by David Greene, starring Richard Chamberlain

=== Music ===
- "Night of the Hunter" (song), by 30 Seconds to Mars, 2011
- "Night of the Hunter (Remix)", a remixed version of the theme from the 1955 film, by Fantômas from their 2001 album The Director's Cut

=== Television ===
- "Night of the Hunter", an episode of The Baron
- "Night of the Hunter", an episode of World of Quest
- "Night of the Hunters", an episode of Bounty Hamster
- "Night of the Hunters", a two-part episode of DreamWorks Dragons
- "Night of the Hunters", an episode of Jumanji

== See also ==
- "Dark Night of the Hunters", an episode of Scooby-Doo! Mystery Incorporated
- "Knight of the Hunter", an episode of Knight Rider
- "The Night and Day and Night of the Hunter", an episode of Moville Mysteries
- Night Hunter (disambiguation)
- Night of Hunters, a 2011 album by Tori Amos
  - Night of Hunters tour, the concert tour in support of the 2011 album
- "Night of Hunters", an episode of Slasher
- The Night of the Hunted, a 1980 French horror film directed by Jean Rollin
