= Necromancer (disambiguation) =

A necromancer is a person who practices magic involving communication with the dead by summoning their spirits as apparitions or visions for the purpose of divination.

Necromancer or The Necromancer may also refer to:

== Characters ==
- Sauron, a character in J. R. R. Tolkien's legendarium, identified as the "Necromancer" in The Hobbit
- Necromancer (Dungeons & Dragons), a character class in the role-playing game Dungeons & Dragons
- Necromancer, a character class in the video game series Diablo
- The Necromancer, a character in the television series Charmed
- Necromancer, a fictional species in the television series Raised by Wolves

== Comics and literature ==
- The Necromancer, an 1857 novel by George W. M. Reynolds
- The Necromancers, a 1909 novel by Robert Hugh Benson
- Necromancer (novel), a 1962 novel by Gordon R. Dickson
- Necromancer, a 1978 novel by Robert Holdstock
- The Necromancer (comics), a comic book series published by Top Cow
- The Necromancer, a 2003 novel by Douglas Clegg
- The Necromancer: The Secrets of the Immortal Nicholas Flamel, a 2010 novel by Michael Scott
- The Necromancer; or, The Tale of the Black Forest, a 1794 novel by Karl Friedrich Kahlert

== Film and television ==
- Necromancer (1988 film), a 1988 American film
- Necromancer (2005 film), a 2005 Thai film
- Nekromancer (film), a 2018 Australian film
- "Necromancer" (Sleepy Hollow), a 2013 television episode

== Gaming ==
- Jaseiken Necromancer, a 1988 role-playing video game by Hudson Soft for the PC Engine
- Necromancer (board game), a 1983 board game published by Steve Jackson Games
- Necromancer (video game), a 1982 video game by Synapse Software for Atari 8-bit computers and the Commodore 64
- Necromancer Games, an American role-playing game publisher

== Music ==
- "Necromancer", a song by Van der Graaf Generator from the 1969 album The Aerosol Grey Machine
- "Necromancer", a song by Sepultura from the 1996 album The Roots of Sepultura
- "Necromancer", a song by Gnarls Barkley from the 2006 album St. Elsewhere
- "Necromancer", a song by Judas Priest from the 2018 album Firepower
- "The Necromancer", a song by Rush from the 1975 album Caress of Steel

== See also ==
- Necromance, a German gothic metal band
- Necromancy (film), a 1972 American film
- Necromantia, a Greek black metal band
- Necromantic (disambiguation)
