= Merlin's Wood =

1994 short novel by Robert Holdstock

- First edition cover (softcover)
- Author: Robert Holdstock
- Cover artist: Geoff Taylor
- Language: English
- Series: Mythago Wood series
- Genre: Fantasy
- Publisher: HarperCollins
- Publication date: 1994
- Publication place: United Kingdom
- Media type: Print (Paperback)
- Pages: 286 pp
- ISBN: 978-0-00-648001-3
- OCLC: 33837524

Merlin's Wood; or, The Vision of Magic is a short novel by British writer Robert Holdstock, first published in the United Kingdom in 1994. The novel is considered part of the Mythago Wood cycle, but takes place in Brittany, France instead of Herefordshire, England. The work has all new characters and focuses on the mythical birthplace and burial site of Merlin, the magical wood Brocéliande. Brocéliande is a smaller version of Ryhope Wood, where British myth predominates.

In addition to the short novel, Merlin's Wood, the 1994 edition features two tales, "Earth and Stone" and "The Silvering". The 2009 edition contains the tales "Scarrowfell", "Thorn", "Earth and Stone", and the novella "The Bone Forest".

== Conception ==
According to the author the work is influenced by Tennyson's Idylls of the King and Joseph Campbell's The Masks of God. The theme of the novel is 'the stealing of power.' The story provides a locale that ties in with the past experiences of Harry Keeton in Mythago Wood and echoes the story of Arnauld Lacan in The Hollowing.

== Plot ==
The 2009 paperback edition of Merlin's Wood.

The main novel is divided into four distinct parts. In the first part, Martin and Rebecca return to the outskirts of Brocéliande, an enchanted forest in Brittany where they grew up as children approximately 15 years earlier. They have returned for the funeral of their mother. Despite being warned to leave by family and local friends, they stay to settle the estate and take up residence in their childhood home.

Martin and Rebecca share stories of the past, some of which involve playing on the path exiting Brocéliande and dancing inside the ghosts that emerge from the forest. As a child, Rebecca gained the gift of song from an encounter with a ghostly troubadour on the path. She later used this gift of song in Australia to bring back her drowned lover, Flynn, from the dead. Conrad, an old man who lives in the woods, relates to Martin a well-kept secret version of the death of Martin's younger brother as a child. Conrad tells how Rebecca became a possessed half-man/half-wolf who fatally mauled the child.

Despite being wary of Rebecca, Martin becomes romantically involved with her, marries her, and together they parent a beautiful boy named Daniel who is deaf, dumb and blind. As they raise Daniel it becomes apparent that Rebecca is slowly losing her sensory perceptions and faculties while Daniel is gaining them. Rebecca first loses her musical ability, then her vision fades, then her speech becomes simplistic, and finally she loses almost all self-awareness. Meanwhile, Daniel progresses from being deaf and blind to singing, speaking, seeing and finally possessing a supernatural sense of hearing. Unknowingly the family has become entangled in an age-old struggle between Merlin and Vivien, wherein a part of Vivien's spirit inhabits Daniel while a part of Merlin's spirit inhabits Rebecca. Martin physically confronts Daniel, but realizes he is physically outmatched and retreats. He also asks Father Gualzator to perform an exorcism on Rebecca, but his request is refused.

Daniel and Rebecca disappear into the forest and Martin discovers them dead by drowning. In an attempt to save them, Martin travels deeper into the heart of Brocéliande in search of Merlin. After traveling across a mystical lake, Father Gualzator assists Martin in freeing Merlin from his underground tomb. Merlin emerges and animates the corpse of Conrad and, as a revenant, communicates with Martin. Merlin recounts his age old struggle with Vivien while Martin pleads with Merlin to bring his family members back to life.

During their conversations, Merlin describes a Hollowing as an area "of no magic." Merlin also explains the origin of the ghosts on the path - they represent his magical powers, purposely divested to prevent Vivien from stealing them. Merlin recounts the seven essential powers of magic:

1. Song - the oldest power which creates life and landscape
2. "Moving stones by the power of hidden water"
3. "Flying to and from the hinterlands of the Otherworld"
4. "Connecting the parts of the beast, both hard and soft"
5. "Understanding of the human spirit as sustenance for mind and body"
6. "The movement of awareness between the soft and hard forms of life"
7. "To control, to contain, to employ the vision, hearing and dreams of children".

After a number of conversations lasting over a period of days, Merlin refuses to bring Daniel or Rebecca back to life. As a final blow, he takes possession of Martin's body.

== Characters ==
=== Human characters ===
- Albert: Martin's father; he is only mentioned in passing.
- Conrad: An elderly man who has lived in Brocéliande for many years. He was originally an invading soldier, but defected from his foreign troop. He has extraordinarily acute hearing and an intimate knowledge of the woodland.
- Daniel: Daniel is the child born to Martin and Rebecca. He is born deaf and blind, but otherwise healthy.
- Eveline Mathilde la-coeur-forte Laroche: Martin's and Sebastian's biological mother and Rebecca's adoptive mother. Her death sets into motion the events in the story.
- Flynn: The former romantic partner of Rebecca who remains in Australia. He was brought back to life after drowning by Rebecca's magical gift of song.
- Father Gualzator: A priest at the local church who is originally from the Basque country.
- Jacques: Eveline's surviving older brother.
- Martin: Martin is the protagonist of the story who left his family home near Brocéliande for Amsterdam at the age of 16. He is a lean man in his late 20s or early 30s when the story starts.
- Rebecca: Rebecca was orphaned at the age of 13 or 14 and is the adopted sister of Martin. She has been living in Australia and is a rugged lady with auburn hair in her late 20s when the story starts.
- Sebastian: Sebastian, or Seb, is the younger brother of Martin and Rebecca who, as a child, died a violent death in Brocéliande.
- Suzanne: Jacques' wife.
- Yvette Valence: A local herbalist who is from the Basque country.

=== Mythic characters ===
Minor mythagos/ghosts appear on the path exiting Brocéliande including Greek warriors, Napoleonic cavalrymen, and others.

- Merlin: The enchanter whose spirit is trapped in Brocéliande. Part of his spirit also resides in Rebecca.
- Old Provider: A mythic threatening large black dog who supplants Saint Nicholas' role as gift giver in the local region. In addition to delivering presents like Saint Nicholas, Old Provider has a dark and threatening nature.
- The Troubadour: A ghost who appears on the path exiting Brocéliande who imparts the power of song to Rebecca when she is a child.
- Vivien: The enchantress who has trapped Merlin. Part of her spirit resides in Daniel.

== Short stories ==
=== "Earth and Stone" ===
This story first appeared in a 1980 work titled Interfaces, edited by Ursula K. Le Guin and Virginia Kidd. Earth and Stone was subsequently revised for inclusion in Merlin's Wood to take into account archaeological discoveries made in the interim. This short story takes place in Ireland where six-thousand-year-old earthen mounds, or tumuli and monumental carved stones mark various tombs. The specific area is Knowth in the valley of the River Boyne in Ireland.

The protagonist, John Farrel, who is in his late 20s, travels back in time (from a presumed future date when time travel is possible) to the third millennium BC to investigate first-hand the archaeological sites to-be. The story takes place over the period of seventeen days. The story is told in episodic form and switches back and forth from first person narratives (relayed to the future in eight separate transmissions) to third person narratives. Farrel plans to meet a fellow archaeologist, Burton, in the past, but soon learns that Burton is missing or dead from Tig, a lone boy from an abandoned local village. (Holdstock also has used Tig as the name of a mythago who briefly appeared in Mythago Wood and played a prominent role guarding a mausoleum and creating mischief in Lavondyss.) Farrel's conversations with Tig are conducted in an awkward megalithic or Stone Age language. The narrative provides parenthetical translations of the conversations throughout the story. Eventually John is led to a necropolis where the members of the village have been buried in shallow graves, yet remain alive due to highly suppressed metabolisms. Eventually these villagers wake, bathe and take up building the largest of the local tumuli. John discovers Burton buried as well, but determines Tig has murdered him with a sharp femur bone. John fears for his life, but is not murdered by Tig. Rather, he is compelled to be buried himself and comes to grips with being buried alive before it happens. Once buried alive, he absorbs the wisdom of dying gods including Earth, Wind, Water, Fire, Sky, Serpent, etc. Upon waking he has been greatly enlightened and has no intention of returning to the future. He then joins the local villagers in building the tumulus, or temple to the earth.

=== "The Silvering" ===
This short story first appeared in a 1992 work titled Narrow Houses, edited by Peter Crowther. The Silvering is a reference to one of the ten wooden masks Tallis Keeton creates in Lavondyss.

In this story the protagonist, Peterson, is the lone survivor of a bomber crash. Peterson saves himself by parachuting to a small deserted island while his companions crash headlong into the nearby ocean. Peterson lives in a small dwelling which he has built from bits of flotsam and materials brought to him by selkies, a mythic race of creatures who can transform themselves from humans into seals (and back again) by using an external skin as a mechanism for transformation. In "The Silvering: if this does not happen in a timely manner, an inner wood-based self (called a nagig) will destructively shed the humanoid exterior and the creature will take root as a tree. Peterson has been stealing and hiding the skins from selkies as they emerge from the ocean to prevent their return to the ocean. However, he eventually falls in love with one of the selkies who returns to land every year for several years to be with him. Eventually she fails to appear, and Peterson tricks another selkie out of her skin and dons it himself, undergoing a painful transformation in order to become aquatic himself and search the sea for his missing love. It turns out she has morphed into a killer whale and eats him before entering another phase of metamorphosis herself.

== Critical commentary ==
Critical reaction to Merlin's Wood has been mixed. One anthologist asserts that within the fantasy genre of literature, Merlin's Wood has been considered essential reading because "Holdstock is a writer who has traveled deeper into the woods than any other mythic writer." However, another writer states "the overall narrative is flawed, distorted by its weight of undeserved loss and inaccessible healing."

Terri Windling selected Merlin's Wood as one of the best fantasy books of 1994, describing it as "a hauntingly beautiful short novel . . . [containing a] rich mix of myth, history, and anthropological lore."

== Books in the Mythago Cycle ==
- Mythago Wood (1984)
- Lavondyss (1988)
- The Bone Forest (1991), a novella and collection of short stories
- The Hollowing (1993)
- Merlin's Wood (1994), a novel and two short stories
- Gate of Ivory, Gate of Horn (1997)
- Avilion (2009)

Note: Despite being considered part of the overall Mythago Wood cycle, the events in Merlin's Wood have little bearing on the events in Ryhope wood.

== Sources ==
- Clute, John (1997). The Encyclopedia of Fantasy (1st ed.). New York: St. Martin's Press. ISBN 978-0312198695.
- Datlow, Ellen (2002). The Green Man: Tales from the Mythic Forest (1st ed.). New York: Viking Juvenile. ISBN 978-0670035267.
- Langford, David (2003). Supernatural Fiction Writers (2nd ed.). New York: Charles Scribner's Sons. ISBN 978-0684312514.
- Morse, Donald E.; Matolcsy, Kalman (2011). The Mythic Fantasy of Robert Holdstock: Critical Essays on the Fiction (1st ed.). London: McFarland & Company, Inc. ISBN 978-0-7864-4942-2.
- Newman, Kim (1996). St. James Guide to Fantasy Writers (1st ed.). Detroit: St. James Press. ISBN 978-1558622050.
