= Lavondyss =

1988 fantasy novel by Robert Holdstock

- First edition cover
- Author: Robert Holdstock
- Illustrator: Alan Lee
- Language: English
- Series: Mythago Wood series
- Genre: Fantasy
- Publisher: Victor Gollancz Ltd
- Publication date: 1988
- Publication place: United Kingdom
- Media type: Print (Hardback)
- Pages: 367
- ISBN: 0-575-04374-1
- OCLC: 18018373
- Preceded by: Mythago Wood (1984)
- Followed by: The Bone Forest (1991)

Lavondyss also titled Lavondyss: Journey to an Unknown Region is a fantasy novel by British writer Robert Holdstock, the second book in his Mythago Wood series. Lavondyss was originally published in 1988. The name of the novel hints at the real and mythological locales of Avon, Lyonesse, Avalon and Dis; within the novel Lavondyss is the name of the remote, ice-age heart of Ryhope wood.

Despite having a new primary character, Lavondyss is a sequel to Mythago Wood because several characters provide links between the novels; the events in Mythago Wood set into motion events that drive the protagonists' actions in Lavondyss.

Lavondyss has won, or been nominated for, several fantasy literature awards.

== Plot introduction ==
Tallis Keeton, the younger sister of Harry Keeton (from Mythago Wood), is the protagonist of the story. Lavondyss starts with Tallis's grandfather and his efforts to write down some of his encounters with the mythagos from the nearby Ryhope Wood; Tallis is still a baby at this point. The story soon jumps forward a few years to where Tallis and her development are concentrated upon – it is at this point that the story shows her developing relationship with the land around her house and the mythagos emerging from Ryhope Wood. This development continues throughout the book as periods in her life from baby to child to teenager to young woman are shown to the reader. As Tallis' shamanistic powers grow, she undertakes a quest in Ryhope Wood to find her lost brother and undergoes a metamorphosis of her own.

== Plot summary ==
During her formative years, Tallis encounters the British composer Ralph Vaughan Williams (not a mythago, but real flesh and blood). Tallis sings him a song that she thinks she has made up herself, but the composer identifies its tune as that of a folk song he has collected personally in Norfolk. Slowly Tallis's links with the wood intensify. She makes ten chthonic wooden masks, each of which represents one of the ten first legends in Ryhope Wood. Within the context of the story, these masks are talismans that help to engage certain parts of her subconscious and so link her with the characters and landscapes which are forming within the wood. When properly used (especially later in the book), these masks allow Tallis to see things that cannot be seen without them, and they can also be used to create 'Hollowings' — pathways in space and time which allow her to step into far-off places within the wood which would otherwise take days, weeks, or even months to travel to on foot. Tallis makes the masks in the following order:

1. The Hollower — made from elm, this female mask is painted red and white.
2. Gaberlungi — made from oak and painted white, this mask is known as "memory of the land".
3. Skogen — made from hazel and painted green, this mask is known as "shadow of the forest".
4. Lament — made from willow bark, this simple mask is painted gray.
5. Falkenna — the first of three journey masks is painted like a hawk; this mask is known as "the flight of a bird into an unknown region".
6. Silvering — the second of three journey masks is painted in colored circles; this mask is known as "the movement of a salmon into the rivers of an unknown region". The Silvering is also the name of a short story included in Merlin's Wood.
7. Cunhaval — the third of three journey masks is made from elder wood; this mask is known as "the running of a hunting dog through the forest tracks of an unknown region".
8. Moondream — made from beechwood, this mask is painted with moon symbols on its face. This mask plays a prominent role in The Hollowing.
9. Sinisalo — made from wych elm and painted white and azure, this mask is known as "seeing the child in the land".
10. Morndun — this mask appears dead from the front, but alive from behind and is known as "the first journey of a ghost into an unknown region".

Before setting foot in the wood, Tallis has one particular encounter that has major repercussions through the rest of the story: with the 'help' of one of the mythagos, she 'hollows' (creates a Hollowing) and observes Scathach, a young warrior, dying on a battlefield beneath a tree. Tallis' misdirected magic used to help this young warrior changes both her story and Harry Keeton's story in Ryhope wood.

Deep within Ryhope wood Tallis eventually meets up with Edward Wynne-Jones (human, not mythago) who was only mentioned in Mythago Wood. He is now living in the wood as a shaman to a small village of ancient people. Through his understanding of the wood (which he studied with the scientist George Huxley from the first book), Tallis herself gains an understanding of her connections with all that surrounds her; most importantly, she asks him how she might find her lost brother Harry Keeton.

== Human characters ==
A 2004 paperback edition of Lavondyss with cover art by Larry Rostant

Edward Gaunt
An older man who is a gardener and keeper of livestock who tends to the Keeton's farm. He is familiar with Ryhope wood and lives in a nearby cottage.
Harry Keeton
A local ex-RAF pilot whose whereabouts in Rhyhope wood are unknown at the conclusion of Mythago Wood.
James Keeton
Father to Harry and Tallis. James plays a prominent role in The Hollowing, a sequel to Lavondyss.
Margaret Keeton
Tallis' mother and James Keeton's wife.
Owen Keeton
Grandfather to Harry and Tallis. Owen dies when Tallis is an infant, but leaves behind a book with important notes for her.
Tallis Keeton
Younger half sister of Harry Keeton and protagonist of the story. Tallis is precocious and has innate shamanistic powers, even as a child. Tallis was born in 1944 and is named after the early Welsh poet Taliesin.
Ralph Vaughan Williams
The composer appears as himself, aged eighty-four when Tallis is thirteen.
Edward Wynne-Jones
A researcher in historical anthropology who teaches at Oxford University. Wynne-Jones is a diminutive and fussy man who smokes a pipe. He is approximately the same age as George Huxley. Together Wynne-Jones and George Huxley study Ryhope Wood extensively in the 1930s. Wynne-Jones makes scientific equipment designed to interact with the paranormal in Ryhope Wood. Wynne-Jones disappears into Ryhope Wood in April 1942.

== Mythagos ==
Broken Boy
This mythago is a great stag of local legend. Broken Boy always appears in an injured state, being lame due to an arrow inflicted wound.
Scathach
This male mythago is the youngest of three brothers. His older brothers are Mordred and Arthur. This mythago is of romantic interest to Tallis and she intervenes in his mythological role.
Tig
This male mythago appeared briefly in a Neolithic village in Mythago Wood and reappears with a more significant role in Lavondyss. Tig also appears in the tale Earth and Stone, first published in the collection titled The Bone Forest.

== Reception ==
Like most sequels Lavondyss has been compared to its predecessor Mythago Wood, and it differs in many ways. Technically Lavondyss is set in the 1950s and has a third person narrative viewpoint; Mythago Wood is set in the 1940s with the first person narrative viewpoint. In terms of content, Lavondyss has a 'darker tone' than Mythago Wood due to its relentless focus "on the earth, stone, blood, dung, and death that are the necessary roots of the story." John Clute describes Ryhope wood in Lavondyss as a "metamorphic terrain of daunting rigor, an excremental sign-saturated inscape charged with twisting energy." He goes on to call the final chapters "superbly deranging and intense", concluding that "Lavondyss begins to seem like a thing in itself, inexplicable and gravid."

Mythago Wood and Lavondyss have been described as being significant because they are pure fantasy works that take place in an innovative, yet startlingly ordinary realm. Holdstock’s writing in these works has been described as an impressive mixture of poetic style and sensitivity. The Ryhope wood series is considered to be "one of the landmark fantasy series of the late twentieth century."

Mythago Wood and Lavondyss have been described by Michael D. C. Drout as being two of Holdstock’s best works which, as fantasies, have an internally consistent framework of principles. These works are noted as dealing with the traditions of the British Isles with originality and deftness by incorporating its unwritten culture, including the Morris dances, the Green Man, Shamanism, Neolithic tribespeople, and pre-Roman Celtic traditions. Death and mortal remains are also prominent and disturbing parts of these works.

Lavondyss rises above the generic nature of genre fiction and approaches literary fiction in its complexity. John Clute gives the work mixed praise and describes Lavondyss as "half pedantry and proselytizing, half an epiphany of metamorphosis that reads like braille, it is a book whose appalling sincerity puts to shame the Celtic junk it fleetingly resembles."

Lavondyss has won a number of awards including the BSFA Award for Best Novel in 1988.

== Chronology of works in the Mythago Wood cycle ==
The order in which the Mythago cycle works were written/published does not necessarily correspond to the order of events within the realm of the Mythago Wood cycle. For example, Gate of Ivory, Gate of Horn and the novella The Bone Forest are prequels to Mythago Wood even though they were published at a later date. The novel Merlin's Wood (1994) and short stories in The Bone Forest and Merlin's Wood have little bearing on the events in the Ryhope wood. See the table below for a chronology of events within Ryhope wood.

Preceded by:	Chronology of Events in Ryhope Wood:	Followed by:
Avilion	Lavondyss	The Hollowing

== Sources ==
- Clute, John (1997). The Encyclopedia of Fantasy (1st ed.). New York: St. Martin's Press. ISBN 978-0-312-19869-5.
- Clute, John (1995). Look at the Evidence (1st ed.). Liverpool: Liverpool University Press. ISBN 0-85323-830-8.
- Drout, Michael (2006). Of Sorcerers and Men: Tolkien and the Roots of Modern Fantasy Literature (1st ed.). China: Barnes & Noble. ISBN 978-0-7607-8523-2.
- Langford, David (2003). Supernatural Fiction Writers (2nd ed.). New York: Charles Scribner's Sons. ISBN 978-0-684-31251-4.
- Larson, Eugene (2002). Classics of Science Fiction and Fantasy Literature (1st ed.). Pasadena: Salem Press. ISBN 978-1-58765-051-2.
- Mathews, Richard (2002). Fantasy: The Liberation of Imagination (1st ed.). New York: Routledge. ISBN 0-415-93890-2.
- Morse, Donald E.; Matolcsy, Kalman (2011). The Mythic Fantasy of Robert Holdstock: Critical Essays on the Fiction (1st ed.). London: McFarland & Company, Inc. ISBN 978-0-7864-4942-2.
- Newman, Kim (1996). St. James Guide to Fantasy Writers (1st ed.). Detroit: St. James Press. ISBN 978-1-55862-205-0.
