= Necromantic =

Necromantic may refer to:

- Necromancy, the practice of magic involving communication with the dead by summoning their spirits as apparitions or visions for the purpose of divination
- Nekromantik, a 1987 German horror film
  - Nekromantik 2, a 1991 German horror film

== See also ==
- Necromancer (disambiguation)
- Nekromantix, a Danish psychobilly band
