= Aztec Century =

1994 alternate history novel by Christopher Evans

- First edition
- Author: Christopher Evans
- Cover artist: Trevor Scobie and Mark Taylor
- Language: English
- Genre: Science fiction alternative history
- Publisher: Gollancz
- Publication date: 1993
- Publication place: United Kingdom
- Pages: 352
- ISBN: 0-575-05540-5

Aztec Century is a science fiction novel by British writer Christopher Evans. In 1994, Aztec Century won the BSFA Award for Best Novel.

First published in 1993 by Victor Gollancz, it is an alternate history novel, in which the Aztec Empire conquers Britain. In this world, Cortez changed sides at the onset of the Conquistador era in the early 16th century, leading to the repulsion of the Spanish Empire's invasion and colonization of Central America. Due to fortuitously strong central leadership, the Aztec Empire has become a technologically sophisticated great power in this alternate 20th century.

Throughout the novel, hints are dropped as to how the timeline differs from our own, though often from the perspective of Aztec officials with an accompanying spin. The Aztec Empire adopts Christianity in the seventeenth century; an Anglo-French alliance led by Napoleon, the Duke of Wellington and Andrew Jackson temporarily halts Aztec expansion in North America with a victory at New Orleans in 1815. India and South Africa are claimed to have 'welcomed' the Aztecs' takeover of their nations from the hated British Empire; Queen Victoria is mentioned as having been assassinated in 1893, and the Caribbean is stated to have fallen in the early 1900s.

Towards the end, a stalemate with the Russian Empire is broken when, in response to Russian use of an experimental nuclear mine, the Aztecs deploy an orbital laser and destroy the city of Rzhev; by analogy with the atomic bombings of Japan at the end of the Second World War, Russia surrenders in the face of a weapon it cannot counter. Finally the last remaining resistance to the Aztecs' hegemonic rule over the Earth is removed in a war between the Empire and an alliance of North American states, named as New England, Canada and the Sioux Confederacy.
