= Christopher Evans (author) =

Welsh science fiction writer (born 1951)

Christopher D. Evans (born 1951 in Tredegar, Wales) is a British science fiction writer and children's author. His novels include Capella's Golden Eyes (1980); The Insider (1981); Mortal Remains (1995); and Ice Tower (2000). He is the co-editor (with Robert Holdstock) of three original SF anthologies, Other Edens (1987); Other Edens II (1988); and Other Edens III (1989).

Evans won the BSFA award for the 1993 novel Aztec Century, which Iain M. Banks described as '...intelligent, finely written, and towards the end, absolutely nail-biting.'

In addition to his works for younger readers, he wrote the tie-in novelisation of the film Innerspace (1987). Evans published these books using a pseudonym. His book Omega, an alternate history thriller, was released by PS Publishing in 2008. It was his first novel for adults in a decade.

== Selected works ==
=== Series novels ===
Hood's Army (as Nathan Elliott)

The Hood's Army trilogy is a series of young adult science fiction novels by Evans, but written under the pseudonym of "Nathan Elliott." The trilogy was published in 1986. The books that make up the series are entitled Earth Invaded; Slaveworld; and The Liberators. They tell of a near future in which Earth is conquered by an alien race named the K'Thraa, and of the resistance force which battles them.

Star Pirates (also as Nathan Elliott)

- Kidnap in Space, (1987)
- Plague Moon, (1987)
- Treasure Planet, (1987)

=== Novels ===
- Capella's Golden Eyes, (1980)
- The Insider, (1981)
- The Twilight Realm, (1985) (as Christopher Carpenter)
- In Limbo, (1985)
- Innerspace, (1987) (as Nathan Elliott)
- Chimeras, (1992)
- Aztec Century, (1993)
- Mortal Remains; Or, Heirs of the Noosphere, (1995)
- Ice Tower, (2000)
- Omega, (2008)

=== Anthologies ===
Other Edens (with Robert Holdstock)

- Other Edens, (1987)
- Other Edens II, (1988)
- Other Edens III, (1989)

=== Short stories ===
- Fidelity, (1980)
- Rites of Winter, (1983)
- The Hiss of Life, (1993)
- House Call, (1995)
- Jamie's Demon, (1995) (as Nathan Elliott)
- The Dreams of the Computer (with Jackie Wilson)

Daughter- Gwen Evans
