= The Insider (Evans novel) =

1981 novel by Christopher Evans

The Insider is a novel by Christopher Evans published in 1981.

== Plot summary ==
The Insider is a novel in which aging author Blair is controlled by a parasitic alien psychic vampire.

== Reception ==
Dave Langford reviewed The Insider for White Dwarf #43, and stated that "More chilling than any number of lurching, blood-spattered vampires, Evan's low-key tensions and domestic concealments make you feel that this lurking mind – always play-acting for fear of exposing its real personality to an unsympathetic world – could almost be your own. Isn't this play-acting what we all do? The ending is sad but satisfying; The Insider is recommended."

== Reviews ==
- Review by Brian Stableford (1982) in Science Fiction & Fantasy Book Review, #2, March 1982
- Review by Ian Watson (1982) in Foundation, #25 June 1982
- Review by Ken Methold (1982) in Omega Science Digest, July-August 1982
- Review by Joseph Nicholas (1983) in Paperback Inferno, Volume 6, Number 6
