= The Bone Forest =

1991 collection of fantasy short stories by Robert Holdstock

- First edition cover
- Author: Robert Holdstock
- Cover artist: Geoff Taylor
- Language: English
- Series: Mythago Wood series
- Genre: Fantasy
- Publisher: Grafton
- Publication date: May 1991
- Publication place: United Kingdom
- Media type: Print (hardback & paperback)
- Pages: 240
- ISBN: 0-246-13833-5
- OCLC: 60107306
- Preceded by: Lavondyss (1988)
- Followed by: The Hollowing (1993)

The Bone Forest is a collection of fantasy short stories by British writer Robert Holdstock, published in 1991 (UK) and 1992 (US). It opens with a novella of the same name, followed by seven short stories. The novella is a prequel to the entire Mythago Wood cycle. According to the author it was written "to fill in the background and back-story to Mythago Wood" at the request of a screenwriter who was working on a planned movie version of Mythago Wood.

The 1991 and 1992 editions of the book contain seven short stories in addition to the novella The Bone Forest., after which the volume takes its name. The additional stories in The Bone Forest bear little relation with either time or events in the Mythago Wood cycle, yet the short stories are largely influenced by the fantasy realm created as part of the Mythago Wood cycle.

The Bone Forest has both won and been nominated for fantasy literature awards.

== Contents ==
- "The Bone Forest"
- "Thorn"
- "The Shapechanger"
- "The Boy who Jumped the Rapids"
- "Time of the Tree"
- "Magic Man"
- "Scarrowfell"
- "The Time Beyond Age"

== Previous publications ==
The short stories in The Bone Forest previously appeared in a variety of publications between 1976 and 1989.

- "Thorn" first appeared in The Magazine of Fantasy & Science Fiction, 1986.
- "The Shapechanger" first appeared in GM Magazine, 1989.
- "The Boy who Jumped the Rapids" first appeared in Beyond the Lands of Never, 1984.
- Time of the Tree first appeared in Zenith, 1989.
- "Magic Man" first appeared in Frighteners 2, 1976.
- "Scarrowfell" first appeared in Other Edens, 1987.
- "The Time Beyond Age" first appeared in Supernova, 1976.

== Subsequent publications ==
The novella The Bone Forest was published as part of the 2009 Gollanz edition of Merlin's Wood along with the tales Scarrowfell, Thorn and Earth and Stone.

== Novella plot summary ==
The Bone Forest with original U.S. cover art by Tom Canty.

The main narrative expands the back story of tensions in the Huxley family taking place in time before the events in Mythago Wood. In this novella George Huxley must contend with a Doppelgänger mythago of himself, who is physically threatening and interacting with his family in undesirable ways. In particular the relationship between George Huxley and his sons is explored.

The story takes place between January 1935 and the late Summer of 1935. The Huxleys reside in Oak Lodge, on the outskirts of Ryhope Wood. One Winter night they are visited by the "Snow Woman". She is a mythago, but the Huxley boys believe she is a gypsy. The Snow Woman leaves a talisman, a necklet of bone and wood, which Steven keeps. In the Spring, George Huxley and Edward Wynne-Jones undertake explorations in Ryhope wood, become separated and encounter dangerous mythagos spawned by Steven's imagination. In a dramatic encounter taking place at an ancient Horse Shrine, George Huxley physically collides with a mythago stallion; this collision results in the creation of the Gray-Green mythago, an alter ego of George Huxley.

When George Huxley returns to Oak Lodge, he discovers the Gray-Green man is writing in his journal, upsetting his children, and having intimate relations with his wife. Both forms agree they must try to recombine, but disagree on the method. This leads to a climactic final scene in which they race to the Horse Shrine (and back in time). The Gray-Green mythago tries to destroy Ash and hang George Huxley, but fails. George relives the collision with the wild stallion, which results in the Gray-Green mythago being banished to the woods and Wynne-Jones reappearing. The story ends back at Oak Lodge with George realizing that many of the intervening events, but not all, seem to have never happened.

== Novella characters ==
=== Human characters ===
Christian Huxley
A boy as well, Christian is the more rambunctious older brother of Steven Huxley.
George Huxley
George is the protagonist of the story and father of Steven and Christian. George is a 45-year-old, tall and lean man who is a scientist in the field of psychology. He has studied with Carl Jung, researched archaeology and obsessed over various myths. Over the course of his studies of Ryhope wood, George produces a scientific journal in six volumes, a personal diary and a detailed map of Ryhope wood.
Jennifer Huxley
Wife of George and mother of Steven and George.
Steven Huxley
A young boy who has just celebrated his 8th birthday prior to the events of The Bone Forest.
Edward Wynne-Jones
A researcher in historical anthropology who teaches at Oxford University. Wynne-Jones is a diminutive and fussy man who smokes a pipe. He is approximately the same age as George Huxley. Together Wynne-Jones and George Huxley study Ryhope Wood extensively in the 1930s. Wynne-Jones makes scientific equipment designed to interact with the paranormal in Ryhope Wood.

=== Mythagos ===
Many mythagos appear in The Bone Forest. The major mythagos are listed below in detail. Minor mythagos appearing include the recurring Robin Hood or Merry Man, and Green Jacks or Jack o' the Greens. Non-recurring mythagos include "Crow Ghost" (a fast, aggressive male with a painted face), three half-man/half-wolf creatures, and a monkey-faced man (perhaps a Cro-Magnon). The Twigling mythago is mentioned in passing, but plays no part in the narrative.

Ash/The Snow Woman
This powerful woman has copper colored hair and wears white fox furs. She is the composite of an ancient shaman prototype and a character from a child's story housed in Steven's imagination. She possesses deep knowledge of both Ryhope wood and its mystical artifacts. She holds power over untamed horses and can manipulate both time and the seasons within the forest.
The Four Horse Hunters
These four men herd stallions through the woods. Their faces are painted red, green, yellow, and blue.
The Gray-Green Man
This mythago is a Gray-Green version of George Huxley; he moves unnaturally fast and is sinister in nature. He is an archetypal representation of the trickster. He exhibits animal litheness and is in much better physical shape than the human George Huxley.
Urscumug
A male half boar/half human representation of the first hero from earliest myth. The malevolent and ancient Urscumug, a variation on the wodewose, is sought out by George Huxley, but never encountered.

== Short story plot summaries ==
Thorn

Thomas, a mason, is the protagonist of this short story. He is compelled to work at night to finish a secret carving on his village's first Christian stone church. The church is being constructed on Dancing Hill, a site of both pagan and Christian religious significance. His project is to carve a semi-animated stone block depicting Thorn, lord of the wood, also known as the Green Man. Completing the project before similar carvings of the twelve apostles are finished will imbue Thorn with power over the church. This story simultaneously explores tension between Christian and pagan and a growing conflict between Thomas’ conscience and the god Thorn. The story was inspired by William Golding's novel The Spire. The story was also included in The Oxford Book of Fantasy, edited by Tom Shippey.

The Shapechanger

This story takes place in England, AD 731 at a Saxon village adjacent to the Dancing Hill, which holds the ruins of an ancient shrine (the setting of the previous short story, Thorn.) The two main characters are Wolfhead, a wild shaman, and Inkmarker, an orphaned child of 10, who subsequently escapes from a monastery and joins Wolfhead. Wolfhead is summoned by Gilla, the chief of the nearby village, to help rid the village of a demon whose power emanates from a stone-lined well in the center of the village. A weakened stone god at the ruins of the ancient shrine warns Wolfhead and Inkmarker of this outsider demon Mabathagus, god of the earth, and father of Hecate. Inkmarker undertakes ritualistic coming-of-age tasks, but becomes hopelessly entangled with the demon as he confronts it.

The Boy who Jumped the Rapids

This is the story of Caylen, an adolescent boy and member of a forest community in mainland Europe. Caylen is the son of Caswallon, his village's chieftain. Caylen is considered possessed because he is able to see through two illusions, one a sheer cliff wall known as Wolfback, and the other a river which appears as rapids, but is actually calm and placid. This river marks the geographical boundary of Caswallon's lands. North of the river is a changing landscape with ancient stone buildings and a tall metal totem, both constructions beyond the skill of Caswallon's people. One day a red haired warrior of Nordic origin visits the village. The warrior wears a horn-helmet and long black robes that flow and billow. He bears a child's spear, that of Rianna, a girl of honor among his people who was brutally murdered by a mercenary. While Caylen makes friends with a 9-year-old boy named Fergus and avoids the bullying abuses of another boy Domnorix, both from his village, the warrior builds a small wooden shrine to honor Rianna in a glade, Old Stone Hollow. On Caswallon's orders, Glamach, the village druid, ritualistically abuses Caylen to cleanse him of his evil. Caylen flees the village to avoid this abuse just as five warriors from the north appear to hunt and execute the warrior. As Caylen flees, he is faced with a decision to between saving the warrior's sacred spear or his friend Fergus.

Time of the Tree

This is an episodic short story told from the viewpoint of an anthropomorphic land. Each episode chronicles events taking place on the land's surface, or skin. The episodes along with brief summaries are:

  - Tundra – Describes the retreat of ice cover from the land and migration of animals.
  - The Birch Accession – Describes the growth of forests upon the land's skin and how the lifespan of trees is used to measure time.
  - The Coming of the Wildwood – As the land warms, temperate forests and larger animals begin to take hold.
  - The Elm Decline – Trees are being cleared for the first human settlements; their burning of trees feels like pinpricks on the skin of the land.
  - The First Totems – Humans organize into clans that develop religious icons, boats and engage in tribal warfare.
  - The Temple Builders – A temple of circular stones is built by humans and witnessed by travelers from afar.
  - Ritual Sacrifice – A young woman is sacrificed and sunk to the bottom of a lake, becoming part of the earth.
  - Journey to the Underworld – The spirit of the sacrificed woman, embodied in various elements of the natural world, travels throughout the lands.
  - Our Lady of the Chromosomes – The land passes the secret of fire-hardened flints to humans via the spirit woman. Forsaken, the spirit woman is reborn as a disastrous flood, temporarily wiping out the humans.
  - Anger of the Gods – After a long sleep, the land awakens to find itself covered with an urban landscape. This irritation is scraped away, destroying the civilization.

Magic Man

This short story takes place in the North American plains and explores the magical power of ocher cave painting. The story involves a group of Native American tribal hunters living off bison, deer and reindeer. The main character is One Eye, an elderly village shaman/painter who resides in a shrine-cave which overlooks the village and grasslands beyond. “He Who Carries a Red Spear” is the tribal leader whose son frequents One Eye's cave. The tribal leader persistently pressures One Eye to use magical paintings to improve his hunting success, not just those of the overall village. The tribal leader's son has innate cave painting abilities and an interest in bears, one of the few animals that will hunt humans. As tensions mount between One Eye and the tribal leader, the son discovers the power of his own cave paintings.

Scarrowfell

This short story focuses on Ginny, a young girl, and the part she plays in a ritualistic dancing festival. This festival proceeds from one small English town to the next, finally ending at Scarrowfell on Lord's Eve day. Ginny, who is an orphaned child with an adoptive mother and a small group of friends, has nightmares and long bouts of sleep leading up to the arrival of the festival. The climax of the story involves a magical pagan ritual inside a ring of elm trees.

The Time Beyond Age

This is a science fiction short story describing a scientific experiment in which two subjects’ rate of aging is increased in an environment that is devoid of all disease. The subjects live for the equivalent of centuries and evolve into exaggerated archetypes of male and female. Eventually they die, but not before the perpetrator of the experiment self-administers the life-altering treatment.

== Critical commentary and awards ==
Critiquing the tale Scarrowfell in the anthology Other Edens, John Clute remarks that "Scarrowfell...floods the frail tale it ostensibly relates with a jumble of moods, too many characters, too much music, and expiation/initiation too complex to be explained in the pages it takes, and bevies of mummers..."

- The Bone Forest was nominated for the World Fantasy Award in the category of Best Collection in 1992.
- Scarrowfell, Valley of Statues and Other Stories and its translation, published in French, won the Prix d'Imaginales award in the New Fantasy category in 2004.

== Chronology of works in the Mythago Wood cycle ==
The order in which the Mythago cycle works were written/published does not necessarily correspond to the order of events within the realm of the Mythago Wood cycle. For example, Gate of Ivory, Gate of Horn and the novella The Bone Forest are prequels to Mythago Wood even though they were published at a later date. The novel Merlin's Wood (1994) and short stories in The Bone Forest and Merlin's Wood have little bearing on the events in the Ryhope wood. See the table below for a chronology of events within Ryhope wood.

| Preceded by: | Chronology of Events in Ryhope Wood: | Followed by: |
|---|---|---|
| n/a | The Bone Forest | Gate of Ivory, Gate of Horn |

== Sources ==
- Clute, John (1997). The Encyclopedia of Fantasy (1st ed.). New York: St. Martin's Press. ISBN 978-0-312-19869-5.
- Clute, John (1995). Look at the Evidence: Essays & Reviews (1st ed.). Ann Arbor: Liverpool University Press. ISBN 978-0-85323-830-0.
- Langford, David (2003). Supernatural Fiction Writers (2nd ed.). New York: Charles Scribner's Sons. ISBN 978-0-684-31251-4.
- Morse, Donald E.; Matolcsy, Kalman (2011). The Mythic Fantasy of Robert Holdstock: Critical Essays on the Fiction (1st ed.). London: McFarland & Company, Inc. ISBN 978-0-7864-4942-2.
- Newman, Kim (1996). St. James Guide to Fantasy Writers (1st ed.). Detroit: St. James Press. ISBN 978-1-55862-205-0.
