= The Twilight Realm =

The Twilight Realm is a novel by Christopher Carpenter published in 1985.

== Plot summary ==
The Twilight Realm is a novel in which five role-playing game players are brought into a fantasy world and must prevail against an evil wizard.

== Reception ==
Neil Gaiman reviewed The Twilight Realm for Imagine magazine, and stated that "Reads like a choose-your-own-adventure game only without the options."

== Reviews ==
- Review by Chris Morgan (1985) in Fantasy Review, August 1985
