= In Limbo (novel) =

1985 novel by Christopher Evans

- First edition (publ. Panther Books); Cover art by Peter Goodfellow
- Author: Christopher Evans
- Language: English
- Publication date: 1985

In Limbo (ISBN 0-586-06338-2) is a 1985 science fiction novel by Christopher Evans, set in contemporary Britain. The novel explores the experience of protagonist Michael Carpenter who has been detained in a mysterious windowless institution called Limbo by its inmates.

== Plot summary ==
Michael Carpenter awakes in a windowless institution. Although the regime in Limbo is quite liberal, Carpenter is not permitted to leave nor to know its purpose. Carpenter's fellow inmates are introduced: leftist intellectual Wright, corpulent joker Riley, fitness fanatic Treadwell and the nervous Sinnott. The highlights of Carpenter's time are his meetings with the glamorous Dr Dempster.

The inmates' have increasing conflicts with their guards. Through these conflicts, the novel explores flashbacks to Carpenter's earlier life. After leaving university, Carpenter has drifted from one dead-end job to another, and also moved between various unsatisfactory sexual relationships, with the strident feminist Veronica, the kleptomaniac Karen, married colleague Eleanor and the unstable Penny.

The novel ends as the inmates make an escape attempt. The book concludes when Carpenter's first steps back in the outside world.
