= Night Hunter (novel series) =

Novel series by Robert P Faulcon

Night Hunter is a novel series by Robert P Faulcon published beginning in 1983.

== Plot summary ==
Night Hunter is a novel series in which the main character seeks to free his family from evil cultists.

== Series ==
The series consists of the following novels:

- The Stalking, 1983
- The Talisman, 1983
- The Ghost Dance, 1984
- The Shrine, 1984
- The Hexing, 1984
- The Labyrinth, 1988

== Reception ==
Dave Pringle reviewed The Stalking and The Talisman for Imagine magazine, and stated that "The author is a known British SF writer, here lurking under his umpteenth pseudonym. Updated Dennis Wheatley, they move along quite adequately, with dollops of gore and sex to keep you in a fun frame of mind."

Dave Langford reviewed Night Hunter for White Dwarf #46, and stated that "Horror fans could do worse than these books."
