= Other Edens =

1987 anthology edited by Christopher Evans and Robert Holdstock

Other Edens is an anthology edited by Christopher Evans and Robert Holdstock published in 1987.

== Plot summary ==
Other Edens is a collection containing 14 science fiction and fantasy stories by British authors.

== Reception ==
Dave Langford reviewed Other Edens for White Dwarf #93, and stated that "excellent stuff by nifty authors from Aldiss to Watson."

== Reviews ==
- Review by David V. Barrett (1987) in Vector 139
- Review by Faren Miller (1987) in Locus, #322 November 1987
- Review by Amy Thomson (1987) in Locus, #322 November 1987
- Review by Andy Robertson (1987) in Interzone, #22 Winter 1987
- Review by John Clute (1987) in Foundation, #40 Summer 1987
