= Night of the Hunter (song) =

Promotional single by Thirty Seconds to Mars

from the album This Is War
- Released: April 8, 2011
- Recorded: 2008–2009; The International Centre for the Advancement of the Arts and Sciences of Sound; (Los Angeles, California)
- Genre: Industrial rock; progressive rock; space rock
- Length: 5:41
- Label: Virgin; EMI
- Songwriter: Jared Leto
- Producers: Flood; Steve Lillywhite; Thirty Seconds to Mars

"Night of the Hunter" is a song by American rock band Thirty Seconds to Mars, featured on their third studio album This Is War (2009). Written by lead vocalist Jared Leto, the song was released as the fifth and final single from the album in 2011. The track was produced by Flood, Steve Lillywhite and 30 Seconds to Mars, and was inspired by Jared and his brother Shannon's youth in Louisiana.

== Background and recording ==
The song was written by Jared Leto, with him playing lead guitar, Tomo Milicevic playing the bass guitar, and Shannon Leto on drums. Jared Leto said the following to MTV News:

My brother and I were born in Louisiana, we had a single mom... who, at the time, was a high school dropout living in the South, [so we] really didn't have very much in terms of materialistic things. And although we moved out of the South when we were kids — you know, we joke we kind of climbed out of the muddy banks of the Mississippi River with food stamps in one hand and our instruments in the other — our mother helped carve a new life for us. And I think that song has some spirit of the South in it; some kind of American Gothic feel.

Lead guitarist Tomo Milicevic said the following about the song to Music Radar:

This is a very special song for me because I think it's one of the most unique-sounding songs on the record, and it's one which gives our listeners a hint at where the band will be going in the future. I also think it's a great example of Flood at his absolute best. He pushed us to take chances and go from a whisper to a scream here, meaning that dynamically we start out with almost nothing and wind up with the most massive production you can imagine. It's a real experience, definitely one designed for good headphones.

== Music video ==
In an interview with MTV, Jared Leto said the following about a potential video:

I would love to make a video for 'Night of the Hunter,' because I think it's one of the most cinematic songs on the record; when we play it live onstage, it always evokes imagery to me.

However, he also said the following:

I would love to make another video. But I think if we did make another video, it would probably kill me, because I've been making videos for the past 18-20 months. I may have to go and check myself in for some time away if I do another video.

== Release ==
In an interview with MTV, Jared Leto said the following about the release of the song:

We never thought this would happen, but we think it's going to be our next single in the States. There's always a song that fans latch onto, that the real music-lovers and the listeners [latch onto]. Fans always mention this, but people didn't quite think that this was the one at the time — some of the people at the record company or at radio stations — but they've warmed up to it, and now it's really fun to have a song that's eclectic and different to be a single.

The song impacted radio on May 17, 2011. On September 18, 2012, a remix of "Night of the Hunter" by the band's drummer Shannon Leto was released as a digital single. Speaking about the remix, he said: "'Night of the Hunter' is one of my favorite songs to play live with my band and I really wanted to reinvent it, to shed a different light on it by bringing a dance element to it."

== Charts ==
Chart (2011)	Peak position
US Hot Rock Songs (Billboard)	50

== Credits and personnel ==
Credits adapted from This Is War liner notes.

- Performed by 30 Seconds to Mars
- Written by Jared Leto
- Published by Apocraphex Music (ASCAP)/Universal Music - Z Tunes, LLC (ASCAP)
- Produced by Flood, Steve Lillywhite, 30 Seconds to Mars
- Recorded by Ryan Williams, Matt Radosevich at The International Centre for the Advancement of the Arts and Sciences of Sound, Los Angeles, CA
- Additional engineering by Tom Biller, Rob Kirwan, Jamie Schefman, Sonny Diperri
- Mixed by Ryan Williams at Pulse Recording Studios, Los Angeles, CA
- Additional strings orchestrated and recorded by Michael Einziger at Harvard University, Cambridge, MA
- Mastered by Stephen Marcussen at Marcussen Mastering, Hollywood, CA
