= Mythago Wood =

1984 fantasy novel by Robert Holdstock

- First edition cover
- Author: Robert Holdstock
- Cover artist: Eddi Gornall
- Language: English
- Series: Mythago Wood series
- Genre: Fantasy
- Publisher: Victor Gollancz Ltd
- Publication date: 1984
- Publication place: United Kingdom
- Media type: Print (hardback)
- Pages: 252
- ISBN: 0-575-03496-3
- Followed by: Lavondyss (1988)

Mythago Wood is a fantasy novel by British writer Robert Holdstock, published in the United Kingdom in 1984. Mythago Wood is set in Herefordshire, England, in and around a stand of ancient woodland, known as Ryhope Wood. The story involves the internally estranged members of the Huxley family, particularly Stephen Huxley, and his experiences with the enigmatic forest and its magical inhabitants. The conception began as a short story written for the 1979 Milford Writer's Workshop; a novella of the same name appeared in the September 1981 edition of The Magazine of Fantasy & Science Fiction.

It won the World Fantasy Award for Best Novel in 1985. It belongs to a type of fantasy literature known as mythic fiction. It has received critical acclaim for the quality of its prose, its forest setting, and its exploration of philosophical, spiritual and psychological themes. It served as the first in a series of novels known as the Mythago Wood or Ryhope Wood cycle.

== Setting ==
The novels and novellas in the cycle all take place around and within Ryhope Wood, with the exception of Merlin's Wood, which takes place in the similarly magical "sister wood" of Brocéliande in Brittany.

Ryhope Wood is an ancient woodland that has been undisturbed since the Last Glacial Period and appears no more than three square miles in area from the outside. But the wood is much, much bigger on the inside than on the outside. Once penetrated, it grows larger, older and more unbearable as one approaches the heart of the wood. Lavondyss is the name of the remote ice-age heart of Ryhope Wood.

The forest is referred to by John Clute as an "abyssal chthonic resonator" because it creates and is home to myth-images, or mythagos, who are creatures (including animals, monsters and humans) generated from the ancient memories and myths within the subconscious of nearby human minds. The book itself defines a mythago as a "myth imago, the image of the idealized form of a myth creature". Mythagos are dangerously real, but if any of them stray too far from the wood they slowly deteriorate and die. As they are formed from human myths, they vary in appearance and character depending on the human memories from which they formed. For example, there may be, over a period, many different forms of King Arthur, Robin Hood, Herne the Hunter and others, all looking and acting differently, yet all with the same basic functions and all acting by the rules set by their defining myths. The area around Ryhope Wood being sparsely populated, there are few mythagos in the woodland, but because of his interest in the wood and his deliberate experiments in the 1930s, George Huxley created more mythagos than would normally be present in the wood at any one time, causing a greater than usual diversity within the wood. It is revealed in The Hollowing, a sequel, that mythagos can be created by conscious thought and are drawn to their creators.

Besides creating mythagos of living, breathing creatures, the wood can also generate ancient archetypal places, from castles to battlefields to ancient villages. These are referred to in the sequel, Lavondyss, as Geistzones.

The wood contains four tracks that lead to the heart of the wood and travellers who do not follow these tracks have extreme difficulty penetrating the wood. In addition to the four tracks Ryhope Wood contains "Hollowings", described as an "absence of magic" or pathways under the world. Hollowings function as wormholes by transporting mythagos and real human beings through space and time within the forest. Time travel occurs when travellers pass through Hollowings. Ryhope Wood magically repels outsiders by various means, including disorientation and physical defences such as thick, impenetrable scrub, huge lakes and raging rivers. There are also airborne defences to prevent aircraft from getting too close, such as vortices of air or air elementals that throw an aircraft off course.

The wood has a slower rate of time than the outside world. For example, a day may pass in normal time, yet a traveller within the wood may have been there for weeks or longer. In addition, "Time Slows", areas subjected to extraordinarily slow passage of time, are revealed in The Hollowing.

== Plot summary ==
The events of Mythago Wood occur between 1946 and 1948. Stephen Huxley returns from service (after recuperating from his war wounds) to see his elder brother Christian, who now lives alone in their childhood home, Oak Lodge, just on the edge of Ryhope Wood. Their father, George, has died recently (their mother, Jennifer, died some years earlier). Christian is disturbed but intrigued by his encounters with one of the mythagos, while Stephen is confused and disbelieving when Christian explains the enigma of the wood. Both had seen mythagos as children, but their father explained them away as travelling Gypsies. Christian returns to the wood for longer and longer periods, eventually assuming a mythical role himself. In the meantime Stephen reads about his father's and Edward Wynne-Jones's studies of the wood. Part of his research on the wood causes him to contact Wynne-Jones's daughter, Anne Hayden. Stephen also meets a local man named Harry Keeton, a burn-scarred ex-RAF pilot, who encountered a similar wood when he was shot down over France and has since been trying to find a city that he saw there. Stephen and Harry try to survey and photograph Ryhope Wood from the air, but their small plane is buffeted back by inexplicable winds each time they try to fly over the trees. Stephen soon has his own encounters with the woodland mythagos (and an older Christian) and eventually, to save both his brother and a mythago girl named Guiwenneth (also referred to as Gwyneth or Gwyn), he ventures deep into the wood, accompanied by Harry.

== Characters ==
=== Human ===
- Stephen Huxley: The protagonist, born in 1927 or 1928.
- Anne Hayden: Edward Wynne-Jones's daughter, who is in her mid-thirties during the main events.
- Christian Huxley: Older brother of Stephen Huxley, who enters Ryhope Wood as an "Outsider" and plays havoc in the woodland.
- George Huxley: The father of both Stephen and Christian. George died while in his mid-50s from a deteriorating lung disease. It is revealed in The Hollowing and The Bone Forest that George was a tall lean man, a psychologist who studied with Carl Jung. He also studied archaeology and became obsessed with myths. Over the course of his studies of Ryhope Wood he produced a scientific journal in six volumes, a personal diary and a detailed map of the wood.
- Jennifer Huxley: Wife of George, and mother of Stephen and Christian. She is mentioned in Mythago Wood, but her suicide becomes a major issue in Gate of Ivory, Gate of Horn.
- Harry Keeton: An ex-RAF pilot who accompanies Stephen into Ryhope Wood.
- Edward Wynne-Jones: A researcher in historical anthropology who teaches at the University of Oxford. Wynne-Jones is a diminutive and fussy man who smokes a pipe. He is about the same age as George Huxley. Together Wynne-Jones and George Huxley study Ryhope Wood extensively during the 1930s. Wynne-Jones makes scientific equipment designed to interact with the paranormal in Ryhope Wood. Wynne-Jones disappears into Ryhope Wood in April 1942.

=== Mythagos ===
- Cúchulainn: A hunter with a large hunting dog who encounters Stephen outside Oak Lodge. Cuchulainn's dog leads Stephen to the buried corpse of an early incarnation of the Guiwenneth mythago.
- The Fenlander: A skilled warrior who commands a group of mythago warriors known as Hawks. The Fenlander and the Hawks serve as Christian's personal bodyguards as he travels to the heart of Ryhope Wood.
- Guiwenneth of the Green (also Gwyneth): She is usually evoked as an older teenager, is from the Bronze Age and appears in various incarnations throughout time, including proto-myth, a girl from Roman Britain, a manifestation of the Earth goddess, a young Celtic warrior princess and Guinevere. Gwyneth's incarnations have varied personalities, some dangerous and others alluring, and differing relations with the members of the Huxley family and Harry Keeton.
- Sorthalen: A shaman or necromancer who can create and control mythagos, including sylphs, or air elementals. He is also known by the name Freya, meaning "friend".
- Twigling: He has red hair and a crown of twigs. He lingers near the edge of Ryhope Wood. The English definition of "twigling" is "child" or "children" which is the same in both its plural and singular form.
- Urscumug: A giant man-boar male mythago who is a representation of the first hero from earliest myth. The Urscumug was generated on purpose by George Huxley and is a malevolent and ancient variation on the woodwose.

== Literary significance and criticism ==
Within the fantasy genre Mythago Wood has drawn critical attention for a variety of reasons over a span of years. Orson Scott Card described it as "for readers who are willing to take the time and effort to let a writer evoke a whole and believable world, peopled with living characters".

Richard Mathews, a literary scholar, states that the Ryhope Wood series is considered to be "one of the landmark fantasy series of the late twentieth century". Another scholar asserts that Holdstock's work stands apart from “genre fantasy” and that “The sequence as a whole is a central contribution to late-20th-century fantasy”.

In one study of Tolkien's work Holdstock is placed in a quartet of noteworthy fantasy authors, alongside Ursula K. Le Guin, John Crowley and Marion Zimmer Bradley, for writing fantasy books that almost have Tolkien's breadth and depth of imagination, and "in some respects surpass Tolkien". Another Tolkien scholar, Michael D. C. Drout, also asserts that Holdstock's fantasy is significant in the fantasy literature genre because in the Mythago Wood cycle Holdstock has created literary works containing the power and aesthetic standards of Tolkien's fantasy without being either a "close imitation of" or a "reaction against" Tolkien.

Dave Langford reviewed Mythago Wood for White Dwarf #58, and stated that "Powerful, impressive and magical, it deserved all manner of awards."

=== Prose style ===
A second type of critical praise and analysis focuses on the quality of the writing. Richard Mathews expresses the opinion that Holdstock's writing is an impressive mixture of poetic style and sensitivity. John Howe, a modern fantasy illustrator, wrote that "Mythago Wood is a wonderful book written with great style, insight and individuality". A decade after Mythago Wood was published Brian Aldiss stated that Holdstock's books were full of ancient power, unrivalled throughout the 1980s. Mythago Wood is also noted for its pairing of sexuality and violence, and has been called “an earthy, tactile, deeply mythological tale set in an English wood.” In Horror: The 100 Best Books Michael Moorcock asserts that "Holdstock avoids sentimentality ... by offering us tougher questions, moral dilemmas, an imagined world far more complex than anything found in the wood's precursors".

=== Philosophical and psychological elements ===
The philosophical and psychological elements of the Mythago Wood cycle have also attracted commentary. The mechanism of mythagos being created from the subconscious ties in with Carl Jung’s understanding of the psyche. The mythagos embody Jungian archetypes since they are dependent on the subconscious, not on distinct memory. Kim Newman notes that the series offers “mind-stretching meditation on the nature of collective imagination". Nicholas Riddick states that "Robert Holdstock's Mythago Wood can be read as a journey into the heartland of the psyche." The story is also considered an "inward spiral" in which the protagonists undergo cruel and devastating metamorphoses in a difficult setting. Brian Aldiss has written that "Ryhope Wood [is] that terrifying metaphor for our mental labyrinths" in which "phylogeny presides over ontogeny" with regard to an individual's history and destiny.

Freudian psychology also appears in the narrative when Stephen and Christian encounter the Urscumug, who displays characteristics of their father.

=== Spiritual elements ===
The interior of Ryhope wood is a pre-Christian British setting in which pagan and shamanistic rituals are common, and one scholar notes that death and mortal remains are prominent and disturbing part of these works. Along the same lines, it is noted that Mythago Wood might convey a more disturbing side of shamanism than other fantasy.

One critical study examines the pagan spiritual aspect of Mythago Wood, in particular how "elements of the series' thesis resonate with pagan worldviews". This is not because Mythago Wood is specifically written for pagans, but because the mechanisms of Ryhope Wood defy science and allow for events that are readily recognizable to pagans.

=== Subject and setting ===
The setting of a myth-rich magical Celtic wood itself, along with its existence side by side with the modern everyday world, are characteristics of particular interest to critics. For example, in a recent study of the fantasy genre Mythago Wood and Lavondyss have been described as works of pure fantasy that take place in an innovative and startlingly ordinary realm. According to one modern Tolkien scholar, Mythago Wood and Lavondyss have an internally consistent framework of principles, and deal with the traditions of the British Isles with originality and deftness by incorporating its unwritten culture. These elements of culture include Morris dances, the Green Man, shamanism, Neolithic tribespeople and pre-Roman Celtic traditions. Michael Moorcock finds Mythago Wood notable for focusing on the subject of unity, including both the unity of the landscape and its inhabitants as well as the unity of dreams and the environment. Moorcock notes Mythago Wood is influenced by The Golden Bough, modern anthropology and the writer Arthur Machen. Moorcock also observes common elements in Mythago Wood, Ursula K. Le Guin's "low fantasy" novel The Beginning Place and George Meredith's poem The Woods of Westermain.

== Awards ==
- The novella Mythago Wood won the BSFA Award for Best Short in 1981.
- The full-length novel Mythago Wood won the BSFA Award for Best Novel in 1984.
- The full-length novel Mythago Wood won the World Fantasy Award for Best Novel in 1985.
- La Forêt des Mythagos, i.e. the Mythago Wood collection, won the Grand Prix de l'Imaginaire in the category of Prix spécial in 2003.
- Mythago Wood was published as part of the Masterpieces of Fantasy series by Easton Press, who describe themselves as releasing 'works of lasting meaning, beauty and importance.'

== Chronology of works in the Mythago Wood cycle ==
The order in which the Mythago cycle works were written and published does not correspond to the order of events within the realm of the cycle. For example, Gate of Ivory, Gate of Horn and the novella The Bone Forest are prequels to Mythago Wood, but were published at a later date. The novel Merlin's Wood (1994) and short stories in The Bone Forest and Merlin's Wood have little bearing on events in Ryhope Wood. See the table below for a chronology of events within Ryhope Wood.

Preceded by:	Chronology of Events in Ryhope Wood:	Followed by:
Gate of Ivory, Gate of Horn	Mythago Wood	Avilion

== See also ==
- Enchanted forest
- Mythopoeia

== Sources ==
- Aldiss, Brian (1995). Modes of the Fantastic: Selected Essays from the Twelfth International Conference on the Fantastic in the Arts (Contributions to the Study of Science Fiction and Fantasy) (1st ed.). Greenport, CT: Greenwood Press.
- Clute, John (1997). The Encyclopedia of Fantasy (1st ed.). New York: St. Martin's Press. ISBN 978-0-312-19869-5.
- Clute, John (1995). Look at the Evidence (1st ed.). Liverpool: Liverpool University Press. ISBN 0-85323-830-8.
- Curry, Patrick (2004). Defending Middle Earth" Tolkien" Myth and Modernity (1st ed.). New York: Houghton Mifflin. ISBN 978-0-618-47885-9.
- Datlow, Ellen (2002). The Green Man: Tales from the Mythic Forest (1st ed.). New York: Viking Juvenile. ISBN 978-0-670-03526-7.
- Datlow, Ellen (2002). Sirens and Other Daemon Lovers: Magical Tales of Love and Seduction (1st ed.). New York: Eos. ISBN 0-06-105782-7.
- Drout, Michael (2006). Of Sorcerers and Men: Tolkien and the Roots of Modern Fantasy Literature (1st ed.). China: Barnes & Noble. ISBN 978-0-7607-8523-2.
- Graham, Harvey (2002). Shamanism: A Reader (1st ed.). London: Routledge. ISBN 978-0-415-25329-1.
- Graham, Harvey (2006). Popular Spiritualities: The Politics of Contemporary Enchantment (1st ed.). Burlington, VT: Ashgate Publishing. ISBN 978-0-7546-3999-2.
- Jones, Stephen (1998). Horror: The 100 Best Books (2nd ed.). New York: Carroll & Graf. ISBN 0-7867-0552-3.
- Jude, Dick (1999). Fantasy Art Masters: The Best Fantasy and Science Fiction Artists Show How They Work (1st ed.). London: HarperCollins. ISBN 0-8230-1636-6.
- Langford, David (2003). Supernatural Fiction Writers (2nd ed.). New York: Charles Scribner's Sons. ISBN 978-0-684-31251-4.
- Larson, Eugene (2002). Classics of Science Fiction and Fantasy Literature (1st ed.). Pasadena: Salem Press. ISBN 978-1-58765-051-2.
- Mathews, Richard (2002). Fantasy: The Liberation of Imagination (1st ed.). New York: Routledge. ISBN 0-415-93890-2.
- Mendlesohn, Farah (2008). Rhetorics of Fantasy (1st ed.). Middletown, CT: Wesleyan University Press. ISBN 978-0-8195-6867-0.
- Mendlesohn, Farah; James, Edward (2009). A Short History of Fantasy (1st ed.). London: Middlesex University Press. ISBN 978-1-904750-68-0.
- Moorcock, Michael (1987). Wizardry and Wild Romance: A study of epic fantasy (1st ed.). London: Victor Gollancz. ISBN 0-575-04147-1.
- Morse, Donald E.; Matolcsy, Kalman (2011). The Mythic Fantasy of Robert Holdstock: Critical Essays on the Fiction (1st ed.). London: McFarland & Company, Inc. ISBN 978-0-7864-4942-2.
- Newman, Kim (1996). St. James Guide to Fantasy Writers (1st ed.). Detroit: St. James Press. ISBN 978-1-55862-205-0.
- Pringle, David (1988). Modern fantasy: the hundred best novels: an English language selection, 1946-1987 (1st ed.). London: Grafton Books. ISBN 0-87226-219-7.
- Ruddick, Nicholas (1992). State of the Fantastic: Studies in the Theory and Practice of Fantastic Literature and Film (Contributions to the Study of Science Fiction and Fantasy) (1st ed.). Westport, CT: Greenwood Press. ISBN 978-0-313-27853-2.
