= The Hollowing =

1993 fantasy novel by British writer Robert Holdstock

- First edition cover
- Author: Robert Holdstock
- Cover artist: Geoff Taylor
- Language: English
- Series: Mythago Wood series
- Genre: Fantasy
- Publisher: HarperCollins
- Publication date: 1993
- Publication place: United Kingdom
- Media type: Print (Hardback)
- Pages: 314
- ISBN: 978-0-246-13834-7
- Preceded by: The Bone Forest (1991)
- Followed by: Gate of Ivory, Gate of Horn (1997)

The Hollowing is a fantasy novel by British writer Robert Holdstock, the third in the Mythago Wood series written. It was originally published in 1993. The title refers to a magical pathway, or hollowing, an archaic English term for a sunken lane or hollow-way. The Hollowing was inspired by the story Sir Gawain and the Green Knight.

Despite primarily featuring new characters, The Hollowing is a sequel to Lavondyss because a handful of characters provide a link between the two novels. The events in the previous novel set into motion the events that drive the actions of the protagonist in The Hollowing.

== Plot ==
The Hollowing shares the third person narrative viewpoint as does its predecessor, Lavondyss. The narrative begins in the 1950s, merely one year after the events that take place in Lavondyss, but the majority of the story takes place in 1968. Inside Ryhope Wood, Tallis Keeton's young friend, Alex Bradley, remains an adolescent when he would otherwise be twenty years old. This is possible because the rate of time inside the wood is not synchronized with the rate of time outside the wood. The story's protagonist is Alex's father, Richard Bradley. Richard is on a quest to locate his lost son in the wood, a very dangerous task because Alex's overactive imagination generates mythagos dangerous to both himself and others.

The day Tallis Keeton disappears into Ryhope Wood in Lavondyss, her father, James Keeton, disappears into the wood to locate her. While he spends only four days in Ryhope Wood, over one year of time passes in the outside world. When he turns up, he is clutching Moondream, one of Tallis’ masks, and is placed in a mental hospital. He is kept close company by Alex Bradley, a young playmate of Tallis’, who alone can calm James. James Keeton has a number of episodes in which he appears to communicate with Tallis through the mask. In a dramatic scene, Richard Bradley sees James Keeton collapse and die. At the same time, his son Alex is physically traumatized by a mythic force. This compromises Alex's mental faculties and he is confined to the same mental hospital. Alex escapes the mental hospital and his highly decayed remains are subsequently found, so he is presumed dead.

After six years Alex's father, Richard Bradley, receives evidence that Alex may yet be alive in Ryhope Wood. Richard joins a scientific expedition to locate his son in the wood, rendered all the more dangerous by the mythagos feeding off Alex's imagination.

During his quest in the wood, Richard Bradley develops a romantic relationship with Helen Silverlock, a Native American. In addition to introducing Native American culture into Ryhope Wood, mythagos about Jack (as in Jack and the Beanstalk), the Tower of Babel and Jason and the Argonauts appear, the last two of which involve variations on myths that are uncharacteristically non-English in origin.

== Characters ==
=== Human ===
- Alex Bradley - The son of Richard Bradley and childhood friend of Tallis Keeton, the protagonist of Lavondyss.
- Alice Bradley - Alex Bradley's mother and the wife of Richard Bradley.
- Richard Bradley - Main character of the story.
- Elizabeth Haylock - A specialist in first millennium European history. She is partnered with Alan Wakeman.
- Ilmari Heikonen - A male Finnish scientist partnered with Pirkko Sinisalo.
- Dan Jacobi - Helen's Silverlock's partner and fellow scientist who has disappeared in Ryhope wood.
- Arnauld Lacan - A tall Frenchman and excellent cook who is one of the scientists exploring Ryhope wood. Arnauld has had traumatic experiences with mythagos in Brocéliande, a forest similar to Ryhope wood, but situated in Brittany. Brocéliande is the location of the events in Merlin's Wood.
- Alexander Lytton -A Scottish scientist who possesses George Huxley's map of Ryhope wood and one of Huxley's two journals. He perceives Alex Bradley's effect on Ryhope wood as a threat to Huxley's nuanced and beautiful vision.
- McCarthy- A small Irishman and specialist who is exploring Ryhope wood. He has a special power to mentally probe the wood.
- Helen Silverlock - A Lakota Sioux woman from Nebraska, she is one of the scientists exploring Ryhope wood.
- Pirkko Sinisalo - A female Finnish scientist partnered with Ilmari Heikonen.
- Alan Wakeman - A paleolinguist and expert in glyphs and Bronze Age culture. He is partnered with Elizabeth Haylock.

=== Mythagos ===
Many mythagos, some minor, appear in The Hollowing. The major mythagos are listed below.

- Giggler - An evil variant on Gawain from the story Sir Gawain and the Green Knight.
- The Green Knight - A good variant on the Green Knight from the story Sir Gawain and the Green Knight.
- Hollyjack - A daurog or mythical variant on a Green Jack, whose bodily form is holly branches and leaves. She has tusks and gives birth to birds. She communicates by chirping and has been sent by the Green Knight to care for Alex Bradley.
- Jack - A dangerous shapechanging variant on Jack from Jack and the Beanstalk. This trickster also manifests himself as a canine foe of Helen Silverlock.
- Jason - The tricky and travel-weary hero from Jason and the Argonauts.
- The Long Man - A benevolent mythago who can create hollowings as needed.
- Sarinpushtam - An abused captive of Jason, "Sarin" is a middle eastern woman who alone survived the collapse of the Tower of Babel. She understands all languages, past, present and future.
- Taaj - A kind boy from a Mesolithic society who befriends Richard.

== Reception ==
The Hollowing was nominated for the Mythopoeic Fantasy Award for Adult Literature in the category of Best Novel in 1995.

== Chronology of works in the Mythago Wood cycle ==
The order in which the Mythago cycle works were written/published does not necessarily correspond to the order of events within the realm of the Mythago Wood cycle. For example, Gate of Ivory, Gate of Horn and the novella The Bone Forest are prequels to Mythago Wood even though they were published at a later date. The novel Merlin's Wood (1994) and short stories in The Bone Forest and Merlin's Wood have little bearing on the events in the Ryhope wood.

== Bibliography ==
- Clute, John (1997). The Encyclopedia of Fantasy (1st ed.). New York: St. Martin's Press. ISBN 978-0-312-19869-5.
- Langford, David (2003). Supernatural Fiction Writers (2nd ed.). New York: Charles Scribner's Sons. ISBN 978-0-684-31251-4.
- Larson, Eugene (2002). Classics of Science Fiction and Fantasy Literature (1st ed.). Pasadena: Salem Press. ISBN 978-1-58765-051-2.
- Morse, Donald E.; Matolcsy, Kalman (2011). The Mythic Fantasy of Robert Holdstock: Critical Essays on the Fiction (1st ed.). London: McFarland & Company, Inc. ISBN 978-0-7864-4942-2.
- Newman, Kim (1996). St. James Guide to Fantasy Writers (1st ed.). Detroit: St. James Press. ISBN 978-1-55862-205-0.
