= Gate of Ivory, Gate of Horn =

1997 fantasy novel by Robert Holdstock

- First edition cover
- Author: Robert Holdstock
- Cover artist: Ron Walotsky
- Language: English
- Series: Mythago Wood series
- Genre: Fantasy
- Publisher: Roc Books
- Publication date: 1997
- Publication place: United States
- Media type: Print (Hardback)
- Pages: 308
- ISBN: 978-0-451-45570-3
- OCLC: 37024785
- Dewey Decimal: 823/.914 21
- LC Class: PR6058.O442 G37 1997
- Preceded by: The Hollowing (1993)
- Followed by: Avilion (2009)

Gate of Ivory, Gate of Horn is a fantasy novel by British author Robert Holdstock. It was originally published in the United States in 1997 (and in the United Kingdom under the title Gate of Ivory in 1998.) The story is a prequel to Mythago Wood and explores Christian Huxley's quest into Ryhope Wood and the apparent suicide of his mother, Jennifer Huxley. The title of the book refers to the gates of horn and ivory described in both Homer's Odyssey and Virgil's Aeneid.

== Conception ==
The tale The Cattle Raid of Cooley was an inspiration according to the author. David Langford, an author, editor and literary critic, points out that the multitude of impossible tasks placed before one of the main characters is based on the Mabinogion's incomplete tale of Culhwch and Olwen.

== Plot summary ==
Original UK cover by Larry Rostant

Christian Huxley enters Ryhope wood on a search for the compelling mythago Guiwenneth and for a better understanding of his mother's suicide. Inside the wood he joins a small group of mythago companions who, in turn, join a vast army of mythagos, numbering in the thousands. This army includes many mythic archetypes including shaman, shapeshifters, and warriors. Among these mythagos are those whose creation is influenced by King Arthur and the Welsh tales of the Mabinogion, specifically the tale of Culhwch and Olwen. Echoing the tales of Culhwch and Olwen, Christian is assigned with completing many impossible tasks. Holdstock uses the story within a story device to have Kylhuk retell a tale involving himself, Olwen and Pwyll, among others.

This army, known as a legion, is pursued by the angry dead on its search for the gates to the underworld. As Christian nears the end of his quest in the wood, he has an opportunity to enter the underworld (like Orpheus) and grapple with the suicide of his mother which has two very different manifestations, one true and one false. While in the underworld he is also faced with a difficult choice of rescuing only one of two loved ones from death.

== Human Characters ==
Christian Huxley
Main character of the story and older brother of Stephen Huxley.
George Huxley
Father of Stephen and Christian and husband to Jennifer. George is a tall man lean man who is a scientist in the field of psychology who has studied with Carl Jung. He has also researched archaeology and obsesses over myths. Over the course of his studies of Ryhope wood, George produces a scientific journal in six volumes, a personal diary and a detailed map of Ryhope wood.
Jennifer Huxley
Wife of George and mother of Stephen and Christian. Her suicide is a central issue in Gate of Ivory, Gate of Horn.
Stephen Huxley
Christian's younger brother.

== Mythagos ==
Abandagora
A male Saracen who is brought back to life and is a member of Legion's advanced scouting group, "Forlorn Hope."
Eletherion
The oldest warrior son of Kyrdu. Eletherion is Kylhuk's foe.
Elidyr
A boatman who is a mythical combination of Bran and Charon, this 10-foot-tall (3.0 m) man takes the dead through the twin gates to the land of the dead. The boatman has the ability to travel through space and time and bring the dead back to life, but only before they pass through the twin gates.
Guiwenneth of the Green (also Gwyneth)
This female mythago (usually evoked as an older teenager) hearkens from the Bronze Age and appears in various incarnations throughout time, including protomyth, a girl from Roman Britain, a manifestation of the Earth goddess, young Celtic warrior princess and Guinevere. Each of Gwyneth's incarnations has a varied personality, some dangerous and other alluring, and differing relations with the members of the Huxley family.
Gwyr
The leader Forlorn Hope. Elidyr brings Gwyr back to life from the ashes. Gwyr is an interpreter of languages and sounder of the war horn.
Issabeau
A female member of Forlorn hope who is a Sorceress and Shapeshifter who served as an apprentice to Merlin. Issabeau has fair skin and long black hair. She shares the same primary myth as Someone.
Jarag
A male member of Forlorn Hope who is gray-haired Mesolithic hunter.
Kylhuk (Kilhwch)
The heavy-set leader of the 4000-person army known as Legion.
Mabon
A man who is bound to guard the entrance to the underworld. Mabon has the power to show true memory to others.
Manandoun
A tall man with white hair who is Guiwenneth's guardian.
Olwen
The woman whose hand in marriage is sought by Kylhuk.
Someone
Someone son of Somebody is a Celt also known as Ironjacket. His father died before naming him so he has no name. Someone wears an iron studded leather jacket and has an orange moustache. He shares the same primary myth as Issabeau.

== Awards ==
Gate of Ivory was a nominee for the British Fantasy Society's Best Novel award in 1998.

== Chronology of works in the Mythago Wood cycle ==
The order in which the Mythago cycle works were written/published does not necessarily correspond to the order of events within the realm of the Mythago Wood cycle. For example, Gate of Ivory, Gate of Horn and the novella The Bone Forest are prequels to Mythago Wood even though they were published at a later date. The novel Merlin's Wood (1994) and short stories in The Bone Forest and Merlin's Wood have little bearing on the events in the Ryhope wood. See the table below for a chronology of events within Ryhope wood.

Preceded by:	Chronology of Events in Ryhope Wood:	Followed by:
The Bone Forest	Gate of Ivory, Gate of Horn	Mythago Wood

== Sources ==
- Langford, David (2003). Supernatural Fiction Writers (2nd ed.). New York: Charles Scribner's Sons. ISBN 978-0-684-31251-4.
- Morse, Donald E.; Matolcsy, Kalman (2011). The Mythic Fantasy of Robert Holdstock: Critical Essays on the Fiction (1st ed.). London: McFarland & Company, Inc. ISBN 978-0-7864-4942-2.
