= Avilion =

2009 novel by Robert Holdstock

- First edition cover
- Author: Robert Holdstock
- Language: English
- Series: Mythago Wood
- Genre: Fantasy
- Publisher: Victor Gollancz Ltd
- Publication date: July 16, 2009
- Publication place: United Kingdom
- Media type: Print (Hardcover)
- Pages: 384
- ISBN: 978-0-575-08299-1
- OCLC: 316002569
- Preceded by: Gate of Ivory, Gate of Horn (1997)

Avilion is a fantasy novel by British author Robert Holdstock. It was published in the United Kingdom on July 16, 2009. It is his first Ryhope wood novel since Gate of Ivory, Gate of Horn was published in 1997. Avilion is Tennyson's term for Avalon in Idylls of the King. Avilion is described by Tennyson as an island valley with ideal weather and fertile land.

The novel Mythago Wood introduces tropes, terminology and a backstory that are built upon in Avilion.

== Plot summary ==
Avilion takes place after the events in Mythago Wood. Steven Huxley and the mythago Guiwenneth have been living in Ryhope wood where they are raising their two children, each half-human, half-mythago. The older boy, Jack, wishes to know about the outside world while the younger girl, Yssobel, dreams about her uncle Christian, who vanished into Lavondyss at the end of Mythago Wood. Despite being comfortably settled and living an idyllic agrarian lifestyle, events at hand will change the family's future.

== Reception ==
Reviews have been very complimentary, with The Times Online saying "This is a wonderful, grown-up fantasy about growing up and moving on, and going home." and The Guardian commenting "Mythago Wood was a seminal expression of British fantasy, and Avilion, though lacking its predecessor's narrative drive and intensity, is an enthralling reworking of myth and a haunting vision of love and loss unmatched in contemporary fantasy."

Avilion was a finalist for a 2010 Mythopoeic Fantasy Award in the Adult Literature Category. It won the 2010 Best Fantasy and Horror Award from the Czech Akademie of Science Fiction.

== Chronology of works in the Mythago Wood cycle ==
The order in which the Mythago cycle works were written/published does not necessarily correspond to the order of events within the realm of the Mythago Wood cycle. For example, Gate of Ivory, Gate of Horn and the novella The Bone Forest are prequels to Mythago Wood even though they were published at a later date. The novel Merlin's Wood (1994) and short stories in The Bone Forest and Merlin's Wood have little bearing on the events in the Ryhope wood. See the table below for a chronology of events within Ryhope wood.

Preceded by:	Chronology of Events in Ryhope Wood:	Followed by:
Gate of Ivory, Gate of Horn	Mythago Wood	Avilion

== Sources ==
- Morse, Donald E.; Matolcsy, Kalman (2011). The Mythic Fantasy of Robert Holdstock: Critical Essays on the Fiction (1st ed.). London: McFarland & Company, Inc. ISBN 978-0-7864-4942-2.
