= Robert Holdstock =

British fantasy and science fiction author (1948–2009)

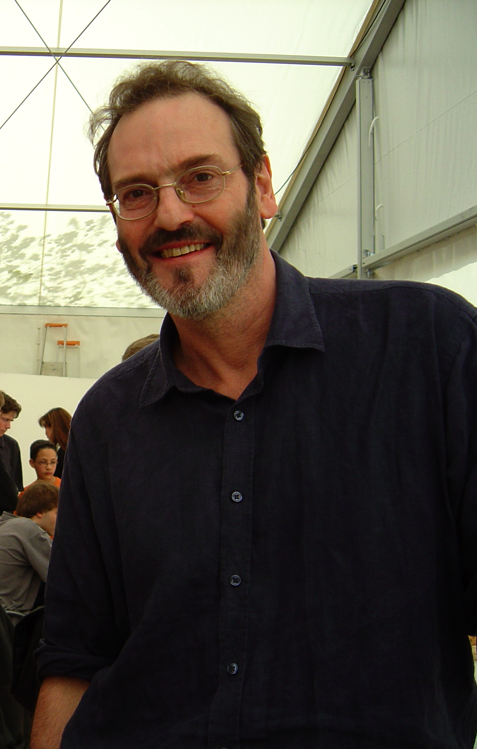
- Holdstock in Épinal, 2004
- Born: 2 August 1948; Hythe, Kent, England
- Died: 29 November 2009 (aged 61)
- Occupation: Novelist
- Writing career
- Period: 1968–2009
- Genres: Fantasy, Science fiction, Horror
- Notable work: Mythago Wood
- Website: robertholdstock.com

Robert Paul Holdstock (2 August 1948 – 29 November 2009) was an English novelist and author best known for his works of Celtic, Nordic, Gothic and Pictish fantasy literature, predominantly in the fantasy subgenre of mythic fiction.

Holdstock broke into print in 1968. His science fiction and fantasy works explore philosophical, psychological, anthropological, spiritual and woodland themes. He received three BSFA awards and won the World Fantasy Award in the category of Best Novel of 1985.

== Early life ==
Robert Holdstock, the eldest of five children, was born in Hythe, Kent. His father, Robert Frank Holdstock, was a police officer and his mother, Kathleen Madeline Holdstock, was a nurse. At the age of seven he started attending Gillingham Grammar School in the Medway Towns. He recalled that as a young adult he had jobs including banana boatman, construction worker and slate miner.

Holdstock earned a Bachelor of Science from University College of North Wales, Bangor, with honours in applied Zoology (1967–1970). He continued his education, earning a Master of Science in Medical Zoology at the London School of Hygiene & Tropical Medicine in 1971. He conducted research at the Medical Research Council in London from 1971 to 1974, while also doing part-time writing and producing a science fiction fanzine. He became a full-time writer during 1976 and lived out the rest of his life in North London.

== Career ==
Holdstock's fantasy novel Lavondyss with cover art by Alan Lee.

Holdstock's first published story, "Pauper's Plot", appeared in the magazine New Worlds in 1968. His first novel was a science fiction work, Eye Among the Blind, published in 1976.

During the late 1970s and throughout the 1980s Holdstock wrote many fantasy and science fiction novels along with a number of short stories, most of which were published under a pseudonym. Robert Holdstock's pseudonyms included Robert Faulcon, Chris Carlsen, Richard Kirk, Robert Black, Ken Blake, and Steven Eisler. These included some adaptions of television scripts for novelisations of television series including The Professionals. During this same period he wrote the text for Space Wars, Worlds and Weapons, a large format book in which he provided essays concerning the tropes of science fiction (and, in one chapter, sword and sorcery), accompanied by colour reproductions of related artwork.

In 1980 Holdstock wrote Tour of the Universe with Malcolm Edwards. The rights were subsequently sold for a space shuttle simulation ride at the CN Tower, also called the Tour of the Universe.

Holdstock wrote The Dark Wheel, the first novella to be included for distribution with a video game, Elite, in 1984. He wrote an adaptation of The Emerald Forest, a film directed by John Boorman, and novelised episodes of the Granada Television series Bulman.

Holdstock's breakthrough novel Mythago Wood was published in 1984. It began the Ryhope Wood series, which continued until the appearance of Avilion in 2009.

Holdstock was guest of honour at the annual Novacon in 1984, and a limited-edition chapbook featuring his fantasy story 'Thorn' was presented to the first 500 attendees.

Between 2001 and 2007 Holdstock produced a trilogy of fantasy novels, the Merlin Codex, consisting of Celtika, The Iron Grail and The Broken Kings.

Holdstock wrote, edited or contributed to a number of nonfiction works, including Alien Landscapes, Tour of the Universe, Horror: 100 Best Novels and Encyclopedia of Science Fiction (a different publication than The Encyclopedia of Science Fiction published in 1979, edited by Peter Nicholls).

== Death ==
Holdstock died in hospital on 29 November 2009 at the age of 61, having been in intensive care since his collapse with an E. coli infection on 18 November 2009.

In 2013 a joint volume of poetry with Garry Kilworth (with whom he collaborated on the award-winning novella "The Ragthorn") was published by PS Publishing, Poems, Peoms and Other Atrocities.

== Critical reception ==
David Pringle described Eye Among the Blind, Holdstock's first science fiction novel, as a "dogged, detailed, somewhat slow-moving planetary mystery". Ursula K. Le Guin called the same novel "As strong a treatment of a central theme of science fiction – alienness, and the relation of the human and the alien – as any I have read."

According to Michael D. C. Drout, Holdstock's Ryhope Wood series is a significant part of the fantasy genre, displaying the power and aesthetic standards of Tolkien's fantasy without being either a "close imitation of" or a "reaction against" Tolkien. Drout considers Holdstock, along with Ursula K. Le Guin, a worthy inheritor of the fantasy tradition created by Tolkien. Patrick Curry placed Holdstock in a quartet of noteworthy fantasy authors, alongside Le Guin, John Crowley and Marion Zimmer Bradley, for writing fantasy books that come close to Tolkien's breadth and depth of imagination, and "in some respects surpass Tolkien".

David Langford offers praise for most of Holdstock's work, but regarded Merlin's Wood less highly: "the overall narrative is flawed, distorted by its weight of undeserved loss and inaccessible healing".

== Book covers ==
The covers of Holdstock's books were produced by a variety of illustrators. The original UK and US covers of Mythago Wood were illustrated by Eddi Gornall and Christopher Zacharow, respectively; Geoff Taylor illustrated the original UK covers for the Mythago Wood sequels Lavondyss, The Bone Forest, The Hollowing and Merlin's Wood. Illustrators of subsequent covers and editions include Jim Burns, Tom Canty, John Howe, Alan Lee, John Jude Palencar, Larry Rostant and Ron Walotsky. John Howe stated: "Holdstock is to me one of the best Celtic fantasy authors alive today."

== Awards ==
- The novel Mythago Wood won the BSFA Award for Best Novel in 1984 along with the World Fantasy Award for Best Novel in 1985. Mythago Wood was published as part of the Masterpieces of Fantasy series by Easton Press, who describe themselves as releasing 'works of lasting meaning, beauty and importance.'
- Lavondyss won the BSFA Award for Best Novel in 1988.
- The Bone Forest was nominated for the World Fantasy Award in the category of Best Collection in 1992.
- The Ragthorn, coauthored with Garry Kilworth, won the World Fantasy Award in the category of Best Novella in 1992 and was nominated for the BSFA Award for Best Novel in 1994.
- The Fetch won the HOMer Award for horror novel in 1992.
- The Iron Grail won the Czech Academy of Science Fiction Fantasy and Horror Award in the category of Best Novel in 2002.
- La Forêt des Mythagos, i.e. the Mythago Wood collection, won the Grand Prix de l'Imaginaire in the category of Prix spécial in 2003.
- The short story "Scarrowfell" in Dans la vallée des statues & autres récits (Denoël, 2004), translated into French by Philippe Gindre, won the Imaginales award (Prix Imaginales) in the Short Story category in 2004.
- Celtika won the Grand Prix de l'Imaginaire in the Foreign Language Novel category in 2004.

== Select bibliography ==
Ryhope Wood series

- Mythago Wood
- Lavondyss
- The Bone Forest, a novella and short story collection
- The Hollowing
- Merlin's Wood, a novel and two short stories (only published in the UK)
- Gate of Ivory, Gate of Horn
- Avilion

Merlin Codex series

- Celtika
- The Iron Grail
- The Broken Kings

Night Hunter series (as Robert Faulcon)

- The Stalking
- The Talisman
- The Ghost Dance
- The Shrine
- The Hexing
- The Labyrinth

Other novels

- Eye Among the Blind
- Earthwind
- Necromancer
- Where Time Winds Blow
- In the Valley of the Statues (short story collection)
- The Emerald Forest (film novelisation)
- The Fetch (also published under the title Unknown Regions)
- Ancient Echoes
- The Dark Wheel computer game novella included in Elite

== Sources ==
- Clute, John (1997). The Encyclopedia of Fantasy (1st ed.). New York: St. Martin's Press. ISBN 978-0-312-19869-5.
- Curry, Patrick (2004). Defending Middle Earth" Tolkien" Myth and Modernity (1st ed.). New York: Houghton Mifflin. ISBN 978-0-618-47885-9.
- Drout, Michael (2006). Of Sorcerers and Men: Tolkien and the Roots of Modern Fantasy Literature (1st ed.). China: Barnes & Noble. ISBN 978-0-7607-8523-2.
- Holdstock, Robert (1976). Eye Among the Blind (1st ed.). New York: Doubleday & Company. ISBN 978-0-385-12681-6.
- Holdstock, Robert (1984). Mythago Wood (1st ed.). London: Victor Gollancz. ISBN 0-575-03496-3.
- Holdstock, Robert (1988). Lavondyss (1st ed.). London: Victor Gollancz. ISBN 0-575-04374-1.
- Holdstock, Robert (1991). The Bone Forest (1st ed.). London: Grafton. ISBN 978-0-246-13833-0.
- Holdstock, Robert (1993). The Hollowing (1st ed.). London: Harper Collins. ISBN 0-00-224201-X.
- Holdstock, Robert (1994). Merlin's Wood (1st ed.). London: Harper Collins. ISBN 0-00-224603-1.
- Holdstock, Robert (1997). Gate of Ivory, Gate of Horn (1st ed.). United States: Roc Books. ISBN 978-0-451-45570-3.
- Jones, Stephen (1998). Horror: The 100 Best Books (2nd ed.). New York: Carroll & Graf. ISBN 978-0-7867-0552-8.
- Jude, Dick (1999). Fantasy Art Masters: The Best Fantasy and Science Fiction Artists Show How They Work (1st ed.). London: HarperCollins. ISBN 0-8230-1636-6.
- Langford, David (2003). Supernatural Fiction Writers (2nd ed.). Charles Scribner's Sons. ISBN 978-0-684-31251-4.
- Morse, Donald E.; Matolcsy, Kalman (2011). The Mythic Fantasy of Robert Holdstock: Critical Essays on the Fiction (1st ed.). London: McFarland & Company, Inc. ISBN 978-0-7864-4942-2.
- Newman, Kim (1996). St. James Guide to Fantasy Writers (1st ed.). Detroit: St. James Press. ISBN 978-1-55862-205-0.
- Pringle, David (1990). The Ultimate Guide to Science Fiction (1st ed.). London: Grafton Books. ISBN 978-0-88687-536-7.
