= Timestream =

Concept in science fiction

The timestream or time stream is a metaphorical conception of time as a stream, a flowing body of water. In Brave New Words: The Oxford Dictionary of Science Fiction, the term is more narrowly defined as: "the series of all events from past to future, especially when conceived of as one of many such series". Timestream is the normal passage or flow of time and its historical developments, within a given dimension of reality. The concept of the time stream, and the ability to travel within and around it, are the fundamentals of a genre of science fiction.

This conception has been widely used in mythology and in fiction.

This analogy is useful in several ways:

- Streams flow only one way. Time moves only forward.
- Streams flow constantly. Time never stops.
- People can stand in a stream, but will be pulled along by it. People exist within time, but move with it.
- Some physicists and science fiction writers have speculated that time is branching—it branches into alternate universes (see many-worlds interpretation). Streams can converge and also diverge.

Science fiction scholar Andrew Sawyer writes, "The paradoxes of time—do we move in time, or does it move by us? Does it exist or is it merely an illusion of our limited perception?—are puzzles that exercise both physicists and philosophers..."

== History ==
Brian Stableford writes of the historical and philosophical concepts of time (and using the terminology of "flow"):

Like space, it is a basic aspect of experience; early philosophical treatments of the idea hesitated in a similar fashion over the question of whether time could be said to exist apart from the objects manifesting its effects. The manner of time's experience is, however, markedly different from that of space; time appears to 'flow' unidirectionally from the past into the future, bearing all existence with it, encapsulated in the momentary present.
The controversy as to whether time's flow is the very essence of reality or a mere allusion was already sharp in Classical times, Heraclitus holding to the former view while Parmenides and Zeno were convinced of the latter.

The ancient Greek philosopher Heraclitus was famous for a statement that has been translated in many ways, most commonly as "No man ever steps in the same river twice," which is often called his "flux [flow] doctrine." An essayist for the Stanford Encyclopedia of Philosophy explained it in this manner: "Everything is in flux (in the sense that 'everything is always flowing in some respects'...) ..."

== Fiction ==
In fiction, an alternate continuity is sometimes called an alternate timestream.

=== Science fiction ===
The Time Stream, a 1946 science fiction novel by author John Taine (pseudonym of Eric Temple Bell), is the first novel to see time as a flowing stream. It was originally serialized in Wonder Stories, in four parts, from December, 1931, to March, 1932. Science fiction scholar E. F. Bleiler described how Taine employed the metaphor:

The basic concept is that time is a circular stream that runs eternally, with far past blending into far future. It is possible for certain individuals to enter this stream mentally and move in either direction, although this is a dangerous venture, for they may be carried away erratically by the stream. ... In San Francisco nine associates, who have been troubled by occasional memories of [the planet] Eos, band together to explore the time stream. They live out crisis moments in both times.

Another mid-century novel which employed the term in its title was The Ship That Sailed the Time Stream (1965) by G. C. Edmondson (pseudonym of José Mario Garry Ordoñez Edmondson y Cotton). John Clute writes that this "and its sequel, To Sail the Century Sea (1981), are amusingly and graphically told Fantastic-Voyage tales involving a US ship and its inadvertent Time Travels. They remain his most successful books."

Other fiction titles with the term include J. Robert King's 1999 novel Time Streams (ISBN 0-7869-1344-4), Michael Moorcock's 1993 collection A Nomad of the Time Streams (ISBN 1-85798-034-4), and Charles M. Saplak's short story "Backwater by the Time Stream" (Manifest Destiny #1, Winter 1993).

Discussing the theme of parallel universes, in an encyclopedia article which can usefully be applied to the concept of timestreams, Brian Stableford and David Langford write,

"A parallel world is another universe situated 'alongside' our own, displaced from it along a spatial fourth Dimension (parallel worlds are often referred to in sf as 'other dimensions'). Although whole universes may lie parallel in this sense, most stories focus on parallel Earths. The parallel-world idea forms a useful framework for the notion of Alternate History, and is often used in this way...
The idea that other worlds lie parallel to our own and occasionally connect with it is one of the oldest speculative ideas in literature and legend; examples range from Fairyland to the 'astral plane' of Spiritualists and mystics. There are two basic folkloristic themes connected with the notion; in one, an ordinary human is translocated into a fantasy land where s/he undergoes adventures and may find the love and fulfilment that remain beyond reach on Earth; in the other, a communication or visitation from the other world affects the life of an individual within this world, often injuring or destroying that person. Both patterns are very evident in modern imaginative fiction, shaping whole subgenres...
A common variant of the theme is that of a multiplicity of almost-identical worlds existing in parallel: alternate worlds in which there has been no significant change."

=== Fantasy ===
Rick Sutcliffe provides a definition in a brief essay on his own fiction: "The timestream is an alternate history device used in Rick Sutcliffe's fiction. It is the medium in which the various alternate earths exist, or, if one prefers, it provides the connections among them, in the manner of C. S. Lewis' wood between the worlds -- a place between."

While not discussing the timestream per se, scholar John Grant discusses a related topic, that of the time slip: "Generally protagonists [return] to their starting points but a frequent device is that, after repeated timeslips, the 'traveler' chooses to remain in the other period. Generally there is an emotional or psychological connection of some kind between the character and the earlier time — most often love... Unsurprisingly, timeslips are a staple of the subgenre of romance fiction called the Paranormal Romance, exemplified by Diana Gabaldson's Outlander (1991) and its sequels."

== Examples ==
Examples of the usage of timestream:

- In DC Comics, the timestream is an invisible current that flows through the DC Universe. It is used as a way for heroes like the Linear Men, and especially Waverider, to travel and correct time fluctuations from time traveling supervillains who seek to alter the correct reality. The timestream was mainly used by Waverider during Armageddon 2001, The Death of Superman, and Zero Hour: Crisis in Time! events. The timestream is connected to the Speed Force, so speedsters are able to tap into certain points in it in order to time travel. It is possible Per Degaton, Chronos, Vandal Savage, Hourman, Max Mercury, Savitar and Epoch, has also used the same type of time stream for time travel.
- In the Legacy of Kain game series, the timestream's nature (as to whether or not it can be changed) plays a vital role throughout the story.
- Similarly, in Three Days to Never by Tim Powers, various individuals and groups try to find and control a time machine, hoping to travel back in time, make changes to events, and thereby enter a parallel universe in which they might find themselves experiencing a happier life. Powers also explicitly links time travel with rivers in his 1983 novel The Anubis Gates.
- In Terra Nova, the Terra Nova settlement exists in a different timestream, so that it does not affect the future of 2149, from where the settlers arrive. To decide upon where (and when) to start the settlement, a timeprobe is sent out from 2149 and, when it cannot be traced back anywhere on Earth, they sense that it reached a different timestream and begin the settlement in that timestream.
- David R. Slavitt's Walloomsac begins with a description of a river and the stones which it flows over; the narrator is philosophical: "What would be the subject? The water rushing by, looking the same but always different?" Later in the narrative, many lives and changes are discussed.
