= William Ashbless =

Fictional poet

William Ashbless is a fictional poet, invented by fantasy writers James Blaylock and Tim Powers.

== Invention ==
Ashbless was invented by Powers and Blaylock when they were students at California State University, Fullerton, in the early 1970s, originally as a reaction to the low quality of the poetry being published in the school magazine. They invented nonsensical free verse poetry and submitted it to the paper in Ashbless's name, where it was reportedly enthusiastically accepted.

The college paper printed poetry, and it was close enough to the '60s that the poetry was all just horrible free verse about children and flowers and rainbows. So we figured we could write poetry that would sound very portentous but be, in fact, meaningless. ... We needed a name for our poet and [came up with] "Ashbless". The paper published them, so we wrote another lot that was dumber, and they published that. ... We said [Ashbless] was hideously deformed and couldn't attend any readings or meetings, but he had given us these poems to read in his stead. ... Blaylock and I would often break out laughing in the middle of reading them, which people thought was very insensitive of us, to be laughing at the poetical efforts of our deformed friend.

— Tim Powers on William Ashbless

== As a character ==
Ashbless is, however, best known in his incarnation as a 19th-century poet, in which guise he appears in Powers's The Anubis Gates (1983) and as a lesser character in Blaylock's The Digging Leviathan (1984). Neither author was aware that the other's novel contained a William Ashbless until the coincidence was noticed by the editor responsible for both books, who suggested that the two consult one another so that their references would be consistent. Ashbless also features (as Sir William Ashbless) in Powers's 1979 novel The Drawing of the Dark, credited with a brief quote before the book's prologue:

If but we Christians have our beer, Nothing's to fear.

In his 1992 novel Last Call (ISBN 0-688-10732-X), Tim Powers includes a poem attributed to William Ashbless in the introduction to Book One. The poem is "from" a later time period, as it mentions airplanes, cars, and blue jeans.

Powers's novel On Stranger Tides opens with an excerpt from a poem by William Ashbless, implying that the novel's name is in reference to the poem:

...And unmoor'd souls may drift on stranger tides

Than those men know of, and be overthrown

By winds that would not even stir a hair...

== As a supposed writer ==
In 1985, Powers and Blaylock produced Offering the Bicentennial Edition of the Complete Twelve Hours of the Night: 1785–1985, a prospectus for a non-existent collection of Ashbless poetry, published by Cheap Street Press. ("The Twelve Hours of the Night" had been mentioned in The Anubis Gates as Ashbless's most famous work.) The prospectus included a sample poem and a replica of Ashbless's signature (the "William" was signed by one, and the "Ashbless" by the other, of the authors). This was followed in 2001 by On Pirates (ISBN 1-931081-22-0)—supposedly written by Ashbless, with an introduction by Powers, an afterword by Blaylock, and illustrations by Gahan Wilson—and in 2002 by The William Ashbless Memorial Cookbook.

== Blog ==
In 2017, Big Hit Entertainment, the label behind K-Pop group BTS, created a blog post on Naver that mentions Ashbless as a character. The blog post tells the fictional story of Ashbless as a 16th-century poet and playing card enthusiast who created a special card known as The Flower. The blog adds details to Ashbless's life in order to flesh out the narrative surrounding some of BTS's concepts. The post was deleted and then re-uploaded in 2018 to further support themes of time travel in BTS's fictional universe.

== See also ==
- Ern Malley, another invented poet, intended to satirise the allegedly low quality of free verse.
