= Lord Kelvin's Machine =

1992 novel by James Blaylock

- Dust-jacket illustration by Jeffrey K. Potter for Lord Kelvin's Machine
- Author: James P. Blaylock
- Illustrator: Jeffrey K. Potter
- Cover artist: Jeffrey K. Potter
- Language: English
- Genre: Science fiction, Steampunk
- Publisher: Arkham House
- Publication date: 1992
- Publication place: United States
- Media type: Print (Hardback)
- Pages: vii, 262
- ISBN: 0-87054-163-3
- OCLC: 23693399
- Dewey Decimal: 813/.54 20
- LC Class: PS3552.L3966 L6 1992
- Preceded by: Homunculus

Lord Kelvin's Machine is a science fiction novel by American writer James P. Blaylock. It was released in 1992 by Arkham House in an edition of 4,015 copies. The author's first book published by Arkham House, the novel is the third in Blaylock's Steampunk series, following The Digging Leviathan (1984) and Homunculus (1986). The first part of the book was formed of an earlier novelette of the same name, which first appeared in the Mid-December 1985 issue of Isaac Asimov's Science Fiction Magazine.

== Plot summary ==
In Victorian London, Alice, the wife of scientist-explorer Langdon St. Ives, is murdered by his nemesis, the hunchback Dr. Ignacio Narbondo. St. Ives and his valet, Hasbro, pursue Narbondo across Norway, contesting Narbondo's plot to destroy the earth and, later, efforts to revivify Narbondo's apparently frozen corpse. In the process St. Ives gains access to a powerful device created by Lord Kelvin, which allows St. Ives to travel through time.

== See also ==
- List of steampunk works

== Sources ==
- Chalker, Jack L.; Mark Owings (1998). The Science-Fantasy Publishers: A Bibliographic History, 1923-1998. Westminster, MD and Baltimore: Mirage Press, Ltd. p. 58.
- Joshi, S.T. (1999). Sixty Years of Arkham House: A History and Bibliography. Sauk City, WI: Arkham House. p. 163. ISBN 0-87054-176-5.
- Nielsen, Leon (2004). Arkham House Books: A Collector's Guide. Jefferson, NC and London: McFarland & Company, Inc. pp. 137–138. ISBN 0-7864-1785-4.
