= The Stone Giant =

1989 novel by James Blaylock

- Author: James Blaylock
- Cover artist: Darrell K. Sweet
- Language: English
- Genre: Fantasy
- Publisher: Ace Books
- Publication date: June 1989
- Publication place: United States
- Media type: Print (Paperback)
- Pages: 264
- ISBN: 0-441-28702-6
- OCLC: 19892130
- LC Class: CPB Box no. 1752 vol. 15
- Preceded by: The Disappearing Dwarf

The Stone Giant (1989) is a fantasy novel by American writer James Blaylock, a prequel to his first published book, The Elfin Ship, and thus the end (as of 2008) of a loose trilogy of comic fantasy novels including The Disappearing Dwarf.

Although written some years after the other two novels, the setting once again features a mix of fantasy and steampunk elements but unlike the others, the protagonist in The Stone Giant is the roguish Theophile Escargot. Few of the characters from the previous novels appear but the antagonist is once again the evil sorcerer Selznak (although referred to as "Uncle Abner" in the story). The book was first published as an Ace paperback by Berkley Books.

The story, a parody of the heroic quest, is set in a world where human beings live alongside elves, goblins, witches, wizards, and other fantastic beings. There Theophile Escargot, a Rip Van Winkle-like malcontent, has series of comic misadventures while attempting both to impress a pretty barmaid and to revenge himself on an evil dwarf who cheated him out of a bag of marbles.

== Plot summary ==
In a fit of pique Escargot eats a pie that his wife had been withholding to bribe him into attending a revival meeting. Unfortunately Stover, the revivalist, is also the local judge and has designs on Escargot's wealthy wife; Escargot winds up homeless and indigent. He becomes infatuated with Leta, Stover's barmaid, and is introduced to a dwarf he believes to be her uncle. Escargot had purchased a bag of odd marbles from a bunjo man (a kind of gypsy/hobo); the dwarf first swindles them from the hapless divorcé, then humiliates and terrifies him for laughs.

After obtaining a settlement from his ex-wife, Escargot leaves for the coastal town of Seaside where he hopes to find Leta at the annual Harvest Festival. A series of misadventures leads him to the submarine of a piratical elf; winding up in sole possession of the vessel Escargot travels through an undersea passage into the land of Balumnia, a sort of siamese-twin world. Escargot's fortunes do not seem to improve as he is rapidly cheated out of money and goods, but he has a surprise encounter with the dwarf and resolves to pursue him. The dwarf attempts to eliminate Escargot but through a combination of persistence and improvisation Escargot survives and learns the dwarf's evil plan: sacrifice Leta and use the marbles to revive the stone giants, ancient enemies of the elves. With the assistance of an eccentric crew of sky-faring elves, Escargot seeks an opportunity to rescue Leta and redeem his many foibles.

== Sources ==
- Great Science-Fiction & Fantasy Works:Light-Hearted Science-Fiction & Fantasy Books
- Science-Fiction and Fantasy Books by James Blaylock
- Of Steam and Stuff: A Conversation with James P. Blaylock
