= The Disappearing Dwarf =

1983 novel by James Blaylock

- Fourth edition cover
- Author: James Blaylock
- Cover artist: Darrell K. Sweet
- Language: English
- Genre: Fantasy
- Publisher: Del Rey
- Publication date: February 1983
- Publication place: United States
- Media type: Print (paperback)
- Pages: 275
- ISBN: 0-345-33089-7
- Preceded by: The Elfin Ship
- Followed by: The Stone Giant

The Disappearing Dwarf (1983) is a fantasy novel by American writer James Blaylock, his second published book and the second of the trilogy that started with The Elfin Ship. The characters are mostly drawn from the first book, while the plot revolves around another encounter with the villain Selznak. As before, the world has magic as well as pseudo-science, and scientific explanation depends on tongue-in-cheek scientific concepts.

The story is set in a world in which human beings live alongside elves, dwarves, goblins, and other fanciful beings including linkmen, a kind of gnome.

== Plot summary ==
Professor Wurzle, a know-it-all scientist, inveigles Jonathan, the master cheeseman of the High Valley, into accompanying him on a trip downriver. Wurzle's real plan is to revisit Hightower Castle, from which the heroes routed Selznak in the previous novel. There the pair discover a treasure map and encounter Miles the Magician, a travelling wizard, in a nearby inn. Miles alerts them that the Squire, a linkman they befriended in the previous novel, has disappeared. Learning that Selznak was seen nearby at the time they fear the worst.

The trio travel to the Territory, ruled by the Squire's father. There they once again encounter linkmen poets Bufo and Gump, as well as Twickenham the elf, who flies the mysterious elfin airship. Twickenham and Miles determine that the Squire has accidentally activated the Lumbog Globe, a magical paperweight allowing travel into the land of Balumnia. Balumnia can also be reached through magical doors, using one Jonathan, Ahab, the Professor, Miles, Bufo, and Gump enter Balumnia.

The group has adventures as they make their way to Landsend, a major port and subject of the treasure map. The dark presence of Selznak and an omnipresent, sinister witch is mitigated by light encounters with an inept stage magician, and an extraordinarily extended panegyric to the virtues of coffee. In Landsend the adventurers encounter the natural fool Dooly with his grandfather Theophile Escargot, who trades in Balumnia using his marvellous submarine. After searching for the treasure, the group splits and Jonathan, Ahab, and the Professor find themselves once again menaced by the evil Selznak, who is plotting to use the Lumbog Globe to terrorize the High Valley. As in the previous novel, however, unexpected allies such as the Strawberry Baron and Cap'n Binky of the magical blend prove crucial in resolving the plot.
