= A Woman of the Sea =

1926 film by Josef von Sternberg

- Directed by: Josef von Sternberg
- Written by: Josef von Sternberg
- Produced by: Charlie Chaplin
- Starring: Edna Purviance; Raymond Bloomer; Charles French; Eve Southern; Gayne Whitman
- Cinematography: Paul Ivano; Edward Gheller
- Distributed by: United Artists
- Running time: 75 minutes
- Country: United States
- Languages: Silent film English intertitles
- Budget: $90,000

A Woman of the Sea, also known by its working title Sea Gulls, is an unreleased silent film produced in 1926 by the Chaplin Film Company. It is one of only two lost Charlie Chaplin films (the other being Her Friend the Bandit), having been destroyed by Chaplin himself as a tax writeoff.

The now lost film starred Edna Purviance, Raymond Bloomer, Eve Southern and Charles French, and was directed by Josef von Sternberg.

== Plot ==
Joan (Purviance) and Magdalen (Southern) are the daughters of a fisherman in Monterey. Magdalen is engaged to Peter (Bloomer), a lowly fisher, until a writer (Whitman) comes to town. Both Joan and Magdalen fancy the writer, but Magdalen wins him over in the end and he takes her back to the big city. Joan and Peter then marry and stay in Monterey. Many years later, Magdalen returns and attempts to break up her sister's marriage, only to fail.

== Cast and crew ==
=== Cast ===
- Edna Purviance as Joan
- Eve Southern as Magdalen
- Raymond Bloomer as Peter
- Gayne Whitman as the Writer
- Charles French as the Father

The Pacific Ocean was also credited by Josef von Sternberg since it was so heavily featured in the film.

=== Crew ===
- Director: Josef von Sternberg
- Producer: Charlie Chaplin
- Directors of Photography: Paul Ivano and Eddie Gheller
- Camera Operator: Mark Marlatt
- Set Decoration: Charles D. "Danny" Hall

Assistant Directors: Charles Hammond, George Sims (Peter Ruric) and Riza Royce

== Production and Release ==
The film was in production for about six months, mainly in the Los Angeles area, including indoor scenes at Chaplin's studio. During a twelve-day period, outdoor scenes were filmed on location in the Monterey and Carmel coastal area in California. Principal photography began in January and concluded on June 2, 1926. Post-production lasted for three weeks, with the final film being seven reels long with 160 intertitles. The entire production cost $90,000 to make.

Chaplin produced the film as a starring vehicle for his former leading lady Purviance, and to help establish Von Sternberg, whose 1924 experimental film The Salvation Hunters had greatly impressed Chaplin. This was the only time Chaplin produced a film in which he neither starred nor directed. His involvement in the production was minimal, as he was concurrently working on his problem-plagued film The Circus (released 1928). This was Purviance's final American film, followed by a French feature film, Education of a Prince (1927), after which she retired from movies.

Von Sternberg held a preview in Beverly Hills in early July 1926 against Chaplin's wishes. The general impression from the few that saw it was that it was a beautiful film, but with little substance. John Grierson called the film "extraordinarily beautiful- but empty." Von Sternberg's secret screening, the lack of a plot and Purviance's poor performance caused Chaplin to decline to release it. It went untouched until the U.S. Internal Revenue Service took an interest in Chaplin's finances. The negatives were burned on June 21, 1933 in front of five witnesses as a total loss for tax purposes. Some evidence suggests that a copy of the film survived at the Chaplin studio until at least late 1946, but no copy exists in the current Chaplin film archives.

== Preservation ==
A Woman of the Sea is currently presumed lost. In February of 2021, the film was cited by the National Film Preservation Board on their Lost U.S. Silent Feature Films list.

In 2005, over 50 previously unknown production stills were discovered in the private collection of Purviance's relatives. Except for a few images in print and a few words in books over the years, nearly nothing has been known about the film. The working title for A Woman of the Sea was Sea Gulls, as written in the shooting schedule that still survives. The original title list also has survived from the film. The information from the shooting schedule and title list has been combined with the production stills, and was published in 2008.

== References in other media ==
The film, and Chaplin himself, figure prominently in Tim Powers' fantasy novel Three Days to Never (Morrow, 2006). Though rooted in established facts, the fictionalized Chaplin is attributed motives—and the film attributed traits—that are largely invented by Powers.
