= Earthquake Weather (novel) =

1997 novel by Tim Powers

- First edition (UK)
- Author: Tim Powers
- Cover artist: Paul Campion
- Language: English
- Series: Fault Lines series
- Genre: Fantasy
- Publisher: Legend
- Publication date: 1997
- Publication place: United States
- Media type: Print (hardback & paperback)
- Pages: 565 pp
- Award: Locus Award for Best Fantasy Novel (1998)
- ISBN: 0-688-10732-X
- OCLC: 24468483
- Dewey Decimal: 813/.54 20
- LC Class: PS3566.O95 L37 1992
- Preceded by: Expiration Date

Earthquake Weather is a contemporary fantasy novel by American writer Tim Powers, published in 1997. It is the third in his Fault Lines series, and the sequel to his earlier novels Last Call and Expiration Date. It involves characters from both previous novels, two fugitives from a psychiatric hospital, the magical nature of multiple personality disorder, and the secret history of wine production in California. Parts of the novel are set in the Winchester Mystery House.

It was a nominee for the BSFA Award and Bram Stoker Award in 1997, and won the Locus Award in 1998. Tor Books commissioned Michael Koelsch to illustrate a new cover art for the republishing of the book, as well as for Powers' previous novel, Expiration Date.
