= Her Friend the Bandit =

1914 film

- Directed by: Charlie Chaplin; Mabel Normand
- Produced by: Mack Sennett
- Starring: Charlie Chaplin; Mabel Normand; Charles Murray
- Cinematography: Frank D. Williams
- Production company: Keystone Studios
- Distributed by: Mutual Film
- Release date: June 4, 1914
- Running time: 18 minutes (One-reel)
- Country: United States
- Languages: Silent film English intertitles

Her Friend the Bandit is a 1914 American short silent comedy film made by Keystone Studios starring Charlie Chaplin and Mabel Normand, both of whom co-directed the movie. It is considered lost.

== Plot ==
Charlie plays an elegant bandit with whom Miss De Rock has a flirtation. Mrs. Rock hosts a party. Charlie attends as a French count (Count de Beans). Charlie's uncouth behavior shocks the other party guests. The Keystone Cops eventually are summoned and remove Charlie from the party.

== Cast ==
- Charlie Chaplin as Bandit
- Mabel Normand as Miss De Rock
- Charles Murray as Count de Beans

== Reviews ==
From the Lexington Herald in Lexington, Kentucky (June 7, 1914): "'Her Friend, the Bandit', Keystone. One of the funniest and most hilarious comedies in a decade, with a conglomeration of mirth-provoking scenes."

From The Oregonian in Portland, Oregon (June 14, 1914): "The Keystone players will offer 'Her Friend, the Bandit', one of those rough and ready farces that make everybody laugh."

== Chaplin's lost films ==
Her Friend the Bandit and A Woman of the Sea are Chaplin's lost films, as no copies are known to exist. As more and more supposedly 'lost' silent films emerge, there is some hope that a copy of Her Friend the Bandit will surface in a private collection somewhere. As late as 1965, five of Chaplin's early comedies for Keystone were considered forever lost. Copies of four of them have surfaced in the intervening decades. Her Friend the Bandit is still considered Chaplin's only 'lost' Keystone film.

== See also ==
- List of American films of 1914
- List of lost films
- The Professor - a 1919 film by Chaplin that was never released.
- A Woman of the Sea - a 1926 film by Chaplin that was never released, and destroyed by Chaplin himself in the 1930s as a tax writeoff.
