= Dinner at Deviant's Palace =

Novel by Tim Powers

Dinner at Deviant's Palace is a novel by Tim Powers published in 1985.

== Plot summary ==
Dinner at Deviant's Palace is a novel in which Rivas rescues members from a cult in the remains of America after a holocaust.

== Reception ==
Baird Searles for Isaac Asimov's Science Fiction Magazine said that "even if this isn't super-powers, there's enough style and originality here to show that he's still an author to keep very much in mind for the future."

Doc Kennedy for Rod Serling's The Twilight Zone Magazine said that "This is a book that works extremely well on its own terms, and it's probably going to get a few prize nominations as well."

Tom Easton for Analog Science Fiction/Science Fact said that "Powers has assembled a basket of strange delights, cast new light on a traditional theme, and spun a very fine yarn".

Robert Coulson for Amazing Stories said that "Powers has all of Heinlein's ability to fill in the background without disturbing the action, coupled with the complexity of van Vogt, and an ability to tie up loose ends."

Science Fiction Chronicle reviewed the book, saying "What might have been a fairly standard plot is embellished wonderfully with so much fine detail that even the most familiar, worn plot devices acquire freshness. This is not quite up to The Anubis Gate, but it isn't far behind, and certainly gets the new year off to a promising start."

Algis Budrys for The Magazine of Fantasy & Science Fiction said that "Powers is one of our better new ones in any event, and that, for now, suffices sufficiently well."

Roland J. Green for Far Frontiers described the novel as "a first-class adventure story, with a nice balance of realism and romanticism. With this book. Powers became the first two-time winner of the Philip K. Dick Award, and I wasn't particularly surprised."

Dave Langford reviewed Dinner at Deviant's Palace for White Dwarf #92, and stated that "Sizzling entertainment: but the sudden triumph over alien omnipotence doesn't quite convince."

== Reviews ==
- Review by Faren Miller (1984) in Locus, #286 November 1984
- Review by Pascal J. Thomas (1985) in Fantasy Review, March 1985
- Review by Martyn Taylor (1986) in Vector 132
