= Expiration Date (Powers novel) =

1996 novel by Tim Powers

- First edition
- Author: Tim Powers
- Cover artist: David O'Connor
- Language: English
- Series: Fault Lines series
- Genre: Fantasy
- Publisher: Tor Books
- Publication date: 1996
- Publication place: United States
- Media type: Print (Paperback)
- Pages: 534 pp
- ISBN: 0-8125-5517-1
- OCLC: 35908254
- Preceded by: Last Call
- Followed by: Earthquake Weather

Expiration Date is a 1996 fantasy novel by American writer Tim Powers. It was nominated for both the Nebula and World Fantasy awards in 1996. Tor Books commissioned Michael Koelsch to illustrate a new cover art for the republishing of the book, as well as for Tim Powers' next novel Earthquake Weather.

== Plot summary ==
The protagonists are Koot Hoomie "Kootie" Parganas, an eleven-year-old boy, and Pete "Teet" Sullivan, a man in his early forties. The novel takes place mostly in Los Angeles in the year 1992, and there are references to the United States presidential election.

The main antagonists are Sherman Oaks and Loretta deLarava. As in Last Call, the previous novel of Tim Powers' Fault Line series, a prominent theme is the quest for immortality. Oaks' age is unknown, deLarava is seventy-six years old (but she often appears to be younger); both have been prolonging their lives by ingesting ghosts. There is a magical system surrounding these ghosts. In their digestible state, they are known as "smokes" or "cigars".

Koot Hoomie Parganas has unwittingly ingested the ghost of Thomas Edison. However, because Kootie has not yet reached puberty, he is not able to digest it. In its undigested state, the ghost of Edison functions as a helper to Kootie. Because of Edison's powerful personality, this ghost is particularly sought after by both antagonists who wish to ingest it themselves. In addition, Loretta deLarava is pursuing the ghost of Pete Sullivan's father, who would help her to locate Pete Sullivan's father's ghost, Arthur Patrick "Apie" Sullivan. Pete Sullivan has his own helper, a former psychiatrist named Angelica Anthem Elizalde.

Loretta deLarava also pursues Solomon Shadroe. Shadroe is the former Nicky Bradshaw. Shadroe/Bradshaw is also the godson of Arthur Patrick "Apie" Sullivan. Shadroe/Bradshaw played "Spooky" in a situation comedy called "Ghost of a Chance".
