= The Man in the Moon (novel) =

- First edition cover
- Author: James Blaylock
- Cover artist: Phil Parks
- Language: English
- Genre: Fantasy novel
- Publisher: Subterranean Press
- Publication date: 2002
- Publication place: United States
- Media type: Print (Hardcover)
- Pages: 268
- ISBN: 1-931081-56-5
- OCLC: 51459959

The Man in the Moon was James Blaylock’s first completed novel, however it remained unpublished for decades (having been rewritten and published long before as The Elfin Ship). It was meant to be the first of fantasy series about a world peopled by elves, dwarves, goblins, and normal people, as well as a smattering of wizards, witches, and other fanciful beings.

Written and submitted about 1978, it was rewritten and the second half expanded following the comments accompanying the rejection by editor Lester Del Rey. Del Rey published the reworked version. According to Blaylock, The Man in the Moon was influenced almost entirely by Kenneth Grahame’s 1908 children's book The Wind in the Willows, along with Mark Twain's Adventures of Huckleberry Finn, The Brownies and the Goblins, and illustrations by Arthur Rackham.

== Plot summary ==
The story centers on a long river trip organized when trading ships with Christmas items inexplicably fail to arrive. Unknown to the heroes, their route downriver to a seaside trading center will take them through areas under siege from evil forces including crazed goblins and malevolent witches.

Professor Wurzle provides somewhat misguided explanations and histories for events as they arise. The youngest character, Dooly, is given to wild fantasies and stories. This frequently leaves the inexperienced adventurer, cheesemaker Jonathan Bing, with competing and implausible explanations as to what is actually going on.

Downstream, they encounter Miles the Magician, the carefree link men, and the elves at running the mysterious elfin ship, seen at inexplicable moments. (Here, the plot diverges significantly from the rewrite, The Elfin Ship. Editor Del Rey described the plot as having gone "haywire".)

The heroes from the downriver trip are taken in an elfin airship to the Moon. There, amid lush valleys, the elves have a kingdom. They begin to look into the activities of Dooly’s mysterious grandfather, but before significant conclusions are reached, they decide to test the curious object carried by the Professor. Discovered in an elfin ship, and believed by him to be a weapon, it is actually a treasure-hunting device. Following minor misadventures, a treasure is found, and the heroes return home to distribute their shares of the treasure to the townspeople.
