= Declare =

2000 supernatural spy novel by Tim Powers

- First edition
- Author: Tim Powers
- Cover artist: J. K. Potter
- Language: English
- Genre: Fantasy, Spy novel
- Publisher: Subterranean Press
- Publication date: June 2000
- Media type: Print (Paperback, Hardcover)
- Pages: 544
- ISBN: 1-892284-79-0
- OCLC: 50031363

Declare (2000) is a supernatural spy novel by American author Tim Powers. The novel presents a secret history of the Cold War, and earned several major fantasy fiction awards.

== Plot summary ==
The non-linear plot, shifting back and forth in time from the 1940s to the 1960s, mainly concerns Andrew Hale, a scholar and occasional operative for a secret British spy organization. Early in World War II, Hale is recruited as part of Operation Declare, an investigation of the true nature of several mysterious beings living on Mount Ararat, and how the Soviet Union has attempted to harness their vast supernatural powers. In this effort he is opposed by real-life communist traitor Kim Philby, a supporting character in the novel, who did travel extensively in the region. The novel proposes that the Great Game, the prolonged geopolitical conflict between the British and Russian empires in the 19th century over domination of Central Asia, was actually part of Operation Declare. The Okhrana, or Tsarist secret police, are cast as the Russian counterpart to Operation Declare.

A sub-plot concerns Hale's on-off romance with Spaniard Elena Teresa Ceniza-Bendiga. A devoted Comintern agent and lapsed Catholic when she first meets Hale, Ceniza-Bendiga eventually rejects communism. While imprisoned in Moscow's notorious Lubyanka prison, she returns to her faith upon discovering the horrible motivation behind the deliberate mass starvation and violent political purges of Stalinist Russia: the placation of an entity called Zat al-Dawahi ("Mistress of Misfortunes") or Machikha Nash ("our stepmother"), a demonic being who demanded human sacrifice in exchange for protecting the nation from foreign invasion.

== Writing ==
In a brief afterword, Powers discusses some of his sources and writing methods. Philby's father, St. John Philby, was a noted Arabist whose book The Empty Quarter (on the desert region Rub' al Khali) was extensively used as source material for the novel. Rudyard Kipling's 1901 novel Kim, about the Great Game, also supplied inspiration and epigraphs. Powers's self-imposed rules prohibited him from disregarding established historical facts and time-lines, instead finding alternate explanations for events (e.g., a real-life 1883 earthquake near Mount Ararat is part of the novel's backstory; and a peripheral comment attributed to British Army officer T. E. Lawrence by playwright George Bernard Shaw is interpreted as proof of Lawrence's involvement in Operation Declare.)

== Reception ==
In 2001 Declare won both the World Fantasy Award for Best Novel and the International Horror Guild Award for Best Novel, and was nominated for a Locus Award. It also appeared on the final ballot for the Nebula Award, however it was later determined to be ineligible because of the limited edition that appeared the year prior to the trade edition. It was published in the UK for the first time in 2010 and subsequently shortlisted for the 2011 Arthur C. Clarke Award for best science fiction novel.
