= Homunculus (novel) =

1986 novel by James P. Blaylock

- First edition
- Author: James P. Blaylock
- Cover artist: James Warhola
- Language: English
- Genre: Science fiction
- Publisher: Ace Books
- Publication date: 1986
- Publication place: United States
- Media type: Print (Paperback)
- Pages: 247
- ISBN: 0-441-34258-2
- Preceded by: The Digging Leviathan
- Followed by: Lord Kelvin's Machine

Homunculus is a comic science fiction novel by American writer James P. Blaylock. It was published in 1986. It was the second book in Blaylock's loose steampunk trilogy, following The Digging Leviathan (1984) and preceding Lord Kelvin's Machine (1992). The book was originally published as an Ace paperback by the Berkeley Publishing Group and is included in the Adventures of Langon St. Ives collection.

Blaylock used the book London Labour and the London Poor by Henry Mayhew to research the period setting.

== Plot summary ==
A dirigible with a dead pilot has been passing over Victorian London in a decaying orbit for some years, arousing the interest of the Royal Society, as well as scientist-explorer Langdon St. Ives and the evangelist/counterfeiter Shiloh. Shiloh is convinced that the dirigible carries his father, a tiny space alien, but withholds this knowledge from vivisectionist Dr. Ignacio Narbondo, who he is paying to reanimate Shiloh's dead mother, none other than Joanna Southcott. Narbondo and the evil millionaire Kelso Drake have their own interest in the alien; Drake possesses its spacecraft, which he uses for perverse purposes in one of his chain of stop-and-go brothels.

St. Ives and his friends of the Trismegistus Club are more concerned with the inheritance of Jack Owlesby, a fine young fellow affianced to Dorothy, the beautiful daughter of toymaker/inventor William Keeble, who builds jolly boxes for space aliens, oxygenators, and gigantic emeralds. Jack's late father bequeathed him just such a gem, but also left behind dark knowledge developed in association with the evil Narbondo. St. Ives and the heroic tobacconist Theophilus Godal suspect that Narbondo and his assistant, the pimply Willis Pule, are using this knowledge to raise the dead, possibly for nefarious purposes. When poor Bill Kraken steals what everyone assumes to be Owlesby's emerald in a fit of alien-induced delirium tremens, the ambitions of Shiloh, Narbondo, Drake, and Pule collide with the heroism of St Ives and Godal and the scientific greed of Parsons of the Royal Academy as Hampstead Heath turns into a carnival of flying skulls, crumbling ghouls, crashing spaceships, and the sparking perversity of the dreadful Marseilles Pinkle.

== Awards ==
Homunculus was awarded the Philip K. Dick Award in 1988.

== See also ==
- List of steampunk works

== Sources ==
- Chalker, Jack L.; Mark Owings (1998). The Science-Fantasy Publishers: A Bibliographic History, 1923-1998. Westminster, MD and Baltimore: Mirage Press, Ltd. p. 58.
