= The Elfin Ship =

1982 novel by James Blaylock

- First edition cover
- Author: James Blaylock
- Cover artist: Darrell K. Sweet
- Language: English
- Genre: Fantasy
- Publisher: Del Rey
- Publication date: August, 1982 (older manuscript version published as The Man in the Moon, 2002)
- Publication place: United States
- Media type: Print (paperback)
- Pages: 338
- ISBN: 0-345-29491-2
- OCLC: 8283411
- Followed by: The Disappearing Dwarf

The Elfin Ship (1982) is a fantasy novel by American writer James Blaylock, his first published book. It is the first of three fantasies by Blaylock about a world peopled by elves, dwarves, goblins, and humans, as well as a smattering of wizards, witches, and other beings. The world has magic as well as pseudo-science. Scientific explanation depends on such tongue-in-cheek concepts as The Five Standard Shapes, The Three Major Urges, and The Six Links of Bestial Sciences. Many of the characters use hyper-polite, conciliatory language.

== Plot summary ==
The story centers on a river trip organized when trading ships with Christmas items inexplicably fail to arrive. Unknown to the heroes, their route downriver to a seaside trading center will take them through areas under siege from evil forces including crazed goblins, malevolent witches, and the sinister dwarf Selznak.

Professor Wurzle provides somewhat misguided explanations and histories for events as they arise. The youngest character, Dooly, is given to wild fantasies and stories. This frequently leaves the inexperienced adventurer, cheesemaker Jonathan Bing, with competing and implausible explanations as to what is actually going on. As the story progresses, it becomes evident that many of Dooly's apparently wilder statements are true.

Downstream, they encounter Miles the Magician, the carefree link men, and the elves at Seaside running the mysterious elfin ship, which is seen at rare, inexplicable moments. These friends are needed to thwart Selznak's plans, which are entwined in their own in ways that only slowly become evident. Dooly's piratical grandfather is hunted down at his fantastic submarine, and forced to reveal his role in assisting Selznak. They decide how to deal with the various threats, Bing, Wurzle, Dooly and Dooly's grandfather heading back upriver to confront Selznak in his castle lair.

== Literary precedents ==
Written and submitted as The Man in the Moon about 1978, it was rewritten, and the second half expanded following the comments accompanying the rejection by editor Lester Del Rey. Del Rey published the reworked version as The Elfin Ship, in 1982. (The Man in the Moon was Blaylock's first novel written to completion.) According to Blaylock, The Man in the Moon was influenced almost entirely by Kenneth Grahame's 1908 children's book The Wind in the Willows, along with Mark Twain's Adventures of Huckleberry Finn, The Brownies and the Goblins, and illustrations by Arthur Rackham.

== Contrasts with the original version ==
The manuscript text for The Man in the Moon, with additional commentaries, was published in 2002 at the suggestion of Subterranean Press in limited editions signed by Blaylock and Tim Powers. The Man in the Moon has about 60 pages of material not incorporated in The Elfin Ship. On the other hand, The Elfin Ship novel deletes nearly all the events in The Man in the Moon's concluding 60 pages, replacing them with 200 pages taking the plot in a different direction. (Some sentences from the original appear in a reworked context in The Elfin Ship.)

The plot diverges where the heroes approach the ocean. In The Man in the Moon, they are taken by elfin airship to the Moon, and discover a treasure. There is no confrontation with Selznak. Blaylock intended The Man in the Moon to have a sequel, as the story reads, "What happened in the following months to the people of the high valley and to the elves and dwarves and link men is another tale and deserves, I think, a story of its own."
