= The Anubis Gates =

1983 time travel fantasy novel by Tim Powers

- Cover of first edition (paperback)
- Author: Tim Powers
- Language: English
- Genre: Time travel, fantasy
- Publisher: Ace Books
- Publication date: 1983
- Publication place: United States
- Media type: Print (hardback & paperback)
- Pages: 387
- ISBN: 0-441-02380-0
- OCLC: 10259963
- LC Class: CPB Box no. 2876 vol. 9

The Anubis Gates is a 1983 time travel fantasy novel by American writer Tim Powers. It won the 1983 Philip K. Dick Award and 1984 Science Fiction Chronicle Award. The plot concerns an English professor who participates in a time travel experiment and ends up trapped in the 19th century. The novel was influenced by Mayhew's London Labour and the London Poor and, to a lesser degree, the works of Charles Dickens.

== Plot summary ==
In 1801 the British have risen to power in Egypt and suppress the worship of the old Egyptian gods. A cabal of magicians plan to drive the British out of Egypt by bringing the gods forward in time from an age when they were still powerful and unleashing them on London, thereby destroying the British Empire. In 1802, a failed attempt by the magicians to summon Anubis opens magical gates in a predictable pattern across time and space.

In 1983, ailing millionaire J. Cochran Darrow has discovered the gates and found that they make time travel possible. Darrow organizes a trip to the past for fellow millionaires to attend a lecture by Samuel Taylor Coleridge in 1810. He hires Professor Brendan Doyle to attend and give expert commentary. One of the magicians, Doctor Romany, happens to spy the time travelers and kidnaps Doyle before he can return. Doyle manages to escape torture and flees back to London, now trapped in the 19th century.

Doyle joins a beggars' guild and meets a beggar named Jacky. He plans to meet and befriend William Ashbless, a wealthy poet who Doyle has studied profusely, in order to gain a benefactor. Doctor Romany scours the city for Doyle with his legion of murderous beggars, led by the clown-magician Horrabin. At the same time, Doyle discovers that Darrow has remained in the 19th century to search for Dog-Face Joe, a body-swapping werewolf, in hopes of bribing Joe into granting him a healthy new body. Doyle himself becomes targeted by Joe, receiving the poisoned body of Darrow's former bodyguard, but manages to cure himself of the poison.

In his new body, Doyle realizes that he himself is the historical Ashbless. He copies down Ashbless's poetry from memory and deduces his own future from his study of Ashbless's life. Using this knowledge, he continues to thwart the magicians' plans. After Romany discovers a gate to 1684, Doyle follows him through and stops his attempt to change the past. Meanwhile, Darrow successfully contacts Dog-Face Joe and organizes a deal in which Joe will provide Darrow with healthy bodies and allow him to live forever.

Doyle eventually returns to 1810, but is kidnapped and taken to Muhammad Ali's Egypt, where the magicians' Master tempts him with resurrecting his dead wife if he will tell them the secrets of the time-gates. Doyle resists and kills the Master. Meanwhile, Jacky discovers Darrow's secret and kills him along with Dog-Face Joe. Doyle returns to London, where the last magician, Romanelli, kidnaps him, Jacky, and Coleridge. In a drugged stupor, Coleridge frees Horrabin's twisted menagerie of monsters, allowing him and Jacky to escape. Romanelli escapes with Doyle to the underworld, but is eaten by Apep while Doyle is rejuvenated on board the sunboat of the god Ra. Doyle meets back up with Jacky and discovers that not only is Jacky secretly a woman, she is his future wife.

Decades later, after living out Ashbless's entire life and becoming a widower, Doyle goes out to meet his historic date with death. Doyle discovers that his intended murderer is a duplicate of himself that the Master had made in Egypt decades before. Doyle kills the duplicate, thereby supplying the corpse for his death, and boats away into an unknown future.

== Major characters ==
- Brendan Doyle: An English professor at California State University, Fullerton, Doyle is still haunted by the motorcycle accident that killed his wife Rebecca. He is a short and non-athletic man who is having difficulty getting published. He is fascinated by the enigmatic poet William Ashbless.
- J. Cochran Darrow: A famous tycoon, suffering from terminal cancer, who has discovered the secret of time travel.
- The Master: The oldest and most powerful magician in the world, now somewhat feeble-minded, the Master plots to rejuvenate magic and restore Egypt by crushing Britain.
- Amenophis Fikee: a powerful magician, Fikee is the Master's agent in Britain. After a magical ritual misfires, his mind snaps and he becomes Dog-Face Joe.
- Doctor Romanelli: a powerful magician, Romanelli is the Master's agent in Turkey and leads a clan of gypsies to do his bidding.
- Doctor Romany: a "ka", or magical duplicate, of Romanelli created to help Fikee in London, Romany takes up Fikee's duties in his absence.
- Jacky: apparently a moustachioed young beggar, Jacky is actually a woman from a noble family who has taken a new identity to search for Dog-Face Joe, who switched bodies with her fiancé and caused her to kill him.
- Horrabin: an evil clown who leads a pack of murderous beggars, Horrabin magically maims some of his minions to be more profitable.

== Reception ==
The Anubis Gates was chosen for Gollancz's Fantasy Masterworks (appearing as #47). Cheryl Morgan lists the novel among "12 Classic Steampunk Books."

Chris Henderson reviewed the book favorably in the December 1983 issue of Dragon, calling it "one of the best books to appear on the shelves this year". Noting it is "one of those rare books—a solid mainstream fantasy novel", Henderson recommended it.

In Issue 29 of Abyss, Eric Olson called this "the best fantasy/sf novel written in the 1980s ... demonstrating a depth of imagination and characterization which are enviable."

Colin Greenland reviewed The Anubis Gates for Imagine magazine, and stated that "Power's manic, macabre imagination paints London as a lurid carnival of sinister gypsies, vicious clowns, beggar tyrants, werewolves, ghouls and eyeless things that scuttle in the sewers."

Dave Langford reviewed The Anubis Gates for White Dwarf #80, and stated that "Profound it isn't but The Anubis Gates offer terrific entertainment and much stealable scenario background for Call of Cockburn or whatever that game is called."

Algis Budrys declared that Powers "supplies the one thing the reader has to have—and never more needfully than in a time-travel story. He supplies room for the reader to participate; to delve into each clearly delineated wonder, to turn it over in his or her own mind with full confidence that the author has honestly drawn the lineaments of the whole scene being presented. He invites the reader to interplay."

A 2006 review at SFReviews.net gives the novel 4.5 out of 5 stars and says, "Tim Powers' masterpiece remains, over 20 years after its first publication, one of modern fantasy's most dazzling acts of the imagination. There have been other novels in the genre about time travel, but none with The Anubis Gates' unique slant on the material, nor its bottomless well of inventiveness. It's literally in a class by itself, a model for others to follow... Powers draws from everywhere: speculative quantum physics, ancient Egyptian mythology, Romany lore, history and classical literature. Then he mixes it all together with the carefree exuberance of a kid with his first chemistry set. The result, of course, blows up the room—but in the best possible way." A guardian.co.uk reviewer called it "a torrential adventure which ranged from 19th-century poets to the gods of ancient Egypt... a thrilling, riproaring, wonderfully inventive adventure." Reviewer Steven Wu rated it 8 out of 10, saying that the book "falls just short of being a truly great science-fiction novel." He wrote, "The main virtue of the book is its unique and imaginative setting, a 19th-century London filled with deformed clowns, organized beggar societies, insane homunculi, and magic," but found the plot "difficult to understand... especially in the completely baffling climactic sequence."

Reviewer Jonathan McCalmont praised the book's tone: "Despite a cast of grotesque supporting characters and more pulpy fantastical elements than you can shake a vorpal sword at, Powers manages to keep the tone of The Anubis Gates darkly atmospheric... The more colourful aspects of the book are anchored in the real and serve only to make the setting more engaging and bizarre... Powers' Regency London never seems camp or farcical, it simply seems utterly alien and forbidding, even to a Londoner such as myself. Every page of this book drips with delicious weirdness. Despite being over 20 years old, it feels as fresh and as powerful as any contemporary fantasy novel you're likely to find. It is Powers' talent for the strange that keeps you turning the pages—which is fortunate as the plotting is far from simple."

Reviewer Shaun Farrell wrote, "With exotic characters and settings, including England of the late 1600s and sunny Egypt, The Anubis Gates is a time travel story that stacks up with the best of them and is sure to [stand] the test of time. It is pure imagination and fun, full of character driven action and humor. A novel that transcends genre limitations, this book will please lovers of all fiction alike."

== Recognition ==
- Philip K. Dick Award winner, 1983
- Locus Award nominee for Best Fantasy Novel, 1984
- British Science Fiction Award nominee, 1985
- SF Chronicle Award, 1984

== Stage adaptation ==
The novel was adapted for the stage and directed by Ruth Pe Palileo, and the stage-play premiered on August 16, 2014, at the ExCel Exhibition Center in London, England.

The original cast featured Johnny Miles as Brendan Doyle, Ariana Helaine as Jacky Snapp, Timothy Cummings as J. Cochrane Darrow and Dr. Romany, Jake Taylor as Amenophis Fikee, Horrabin the Clown, and Lord Byron, and Geo Nikols as Steerforth Benner.

== In popular culture ==
Javier Olivares has stated that the novel was one of the main inspirations for the Spanish television show El Ministerio del Tiempo, which he co-created.

Andy Lane has stated his Doctor Who novel, All-Consuming Fire, was "[his] attempt to emulate" Powers' Anubis Gates.

== See also ==
- Punch and Judy
- Egyptian mythology
- Fictional representations of Roma
- Romani language
- Steampunk
