= The Drawing of the Dark =

1979 novel by Tim Powers

- First edition
- Author: Tim Powers
- Cover artist: Doug Beekman
- Language: English
- Genre: Historical fantasy
- Publisher: Del Rey Books (US); Del Rey Books (US); Grafton (UK)
- Publication date: 1979
- Publication place: United States
- Media type: Print (Paperback)
- Pages: 336 pp
- ISBN: 0-345-43081-6
- OCLC: 43080316
- Dewey Decimal: 813/.54 21
- LC Class: PS3566.O95 D73 1999

The Drawing of the Dark is a historical fantasy novel by Tim Powers published in 1979 by Del Rey Books.

== Plot summary ==
In 1529, Brian Duffy, a world-weary Irish mercenary soldier, is hired in Venice by the mysterious Aurelianus to work as a bouncer at the Zimmerman Inn, former monastery located in Vienna, and current brewery of the famous Herzwesten beer.

Meanwhile, the Ottoman Turkish army under Sultan Suleiman I has achieved its most advanced position yet in their march into Europe, and is prepared to undertake the siege of Vienna. With the Turkish army travels the Grand Vizier Ibrahim, a magician who intends to use horrific spells as part of the siege.

Years earlier, Duffy had spent time in Vienna, and as he returns, he is haunted by memories of past events and finds himself having visions of mythical creatures and ambushed by shadowy people and demonic monsters.

Upon arriving, Duffy reconnects with Epiphany Vogel, a former girlfriend, and her father Gustav, who is working on a painting he calls "The Death of St. Michael the Archangel". It seems the painting is never quite complete, and the elder Vogel is continuously adding additional detail to the work, causing it to gradually become more and more obscure.

Then Duffy finds himself not only drafted into the city's defensive army, but also led by Aurelianus down mystical paths from the surprisingly old brewery to even more ancient caves beneath the city, in search of defenses against the approaching army and clues to Duffy's real nature.

As it turns out, Aurelianus knows more about Duffy and his past than Duffy himself knows, and his real purpose in hiring him is to protect the hidden Fisher King, secret spiritual leader of the western world, and to defend him and the West against the Turkish advance. And the real reason that Vienna must not be captured by the Turks is that it is the site of the Herzwesten brewery. Its light and bock beers are famous throughout Europe, but the dark beer, produced only every seven hundred years, has supernatural properties and must not be allowed to fall into enemy hands.

Meanwhile, others are drawn to Vienna in anticipation of significant events. The so-called "dark birds", magically sensitive individuals from far flung corners of the world, arrive in the city hoping for a sip of the Herzwesten dark, and a small group of middle-aged Vikings have improbably sailed their ship down the Danube River to Vienna, having sensed that the prophesied final battle of Ragnarok will take place there.

== Reception ==
The SF Site called it a "jewel". Black Gate noted that it is "full of the sort of inventive oddness common to Powers’s works", and praised both the characterization and the sudden tone shift (from "autumnal" to "positively wintry" ) halfway through.

James Nicoll has described it as feeling like "a rough draft of a Powers novel", but emphasized that this is not meant as criticism; rather, "later Powers novels were even better". At Pornokitsch, Amal El-Mohtar similarly found it to be a "proto-Powers work", containing "the seeds of future writing that (she) absolutely loved", but faulted it for excessive Orientalism, and for not portraying the viewpoints of any of the non-Western characters.

== Used myths and historical persons ==
- King Arthur/Sigmund (Brian Duffy)
- Merlin (Aurelius Ambrosius).
- Fisher King – The secret king of the west, whose health is tied to that of the land and must be protected or else the western world will suffer.
- Roman god Bacchus
- Charon – ferryman
- Gambrinus – brewer
- Antoku Ten-no (the Emperor Antoku)
- Ghost of Finn Mac Cool
- Lady of the Lake, Morgan le Fay
- John Zápolya (loosely based on the real John Zápolya)
- The Morrígan
