= Last Call (novel) =

1992 novel by Tim Powers

- Author: Tim Powers
- Cover artist: Rick Lovell
- Language: English
- Series: Fault Lines series
- Genre: Fantasy
- Publisher: William Morrow & Co
- Publication date: 1992
- Publication place: United States
- Media type: Print (hardback & paperback)
- Pages: 479
- Award: Locus Award for Best Fantasy Novel (1993)
- ISBN: 0-688-10732-X
- OCLC: 24468483
- Dewey Decimal: 813/.54 20
- LC Class: PS3566.O95 L37 1992
- Followed by: Expiration Date

Last Call is a fantasy novel by American writer Tim Powers. It was published by William Morrow & Co in 1992. It is the first book in a trilogy called Fault Lines. The second book, Expiration Date (1996), is loosely related to Last Call, and the third book, Earthquake Weather (1997), acts as a sequel to both of the first two.

== Plot summary ==
The novel focuses on Scott Crane, a professional gambler and grieving middle-aged widower who is the son of Georges Leon, a powerful occultist and mobster. Decades earlier, Leon killed Bugsy Siegel to take over the latter's rackets and assume the mantle of the Fisher King. Leon also uses a system of Tarot card sorcery to transfer his consciousness into other people's bodies in an attempt to attain immortality, at the cost of turning the person into a mindless automaton. Leon began this magical rite with young Scott before the act was interrupted by Scott's mother who shot and wounded Leon and hid Scott under an assumed identity.

As an adult Scott realizes the events of his youth are unresolved and impacting his current life. He reconnects with his estranged foster father Ozzie and foster sister Diana to confront Leon. Last Call is set mostly in and around Los Angeles, California and Las Vegas, Nevada.

Like many of Powers' novels, Last Call features a detailed magic system, here based on divinatory tarot, and draws on mythical or historical events and characters. Powers uses details of real-life mobster Bugsy Siegel's life, and the development of Las Vegas casinos as well as the legend of the Fisher King. Powers also makes use of T. S. Eliot's poem The Waste Land throughout, which also features the Fisher King legend.

Powers doesn't disregard any established historical facts and timelines, but finds alternate supernatural explanations for real-world events, a genre known as a "secret history".

== Awards ==
Last Call won the World Fantasy Award for Best Novel and the Locus Award for Best Fantasy Novel in 1993.
