= Three Days to Never =

2006 fantasy novel by Tim Powers

- First edition
- Author: Tim Powers
- Language: English
- Genre: Fantasy
- Publisher: Subterranean Press
- Publication date: July 2006
- Media type: Hardcover
- Pages: 344
- ISBN: 1-59606-049-2
- OCLC: 63122894
- Dewey Decimal: 813/.54 22
- LC Class: PS3566.O95 T48 2006

Three Days to Never is a 2006 fantasy novel by Tim Powers. As with most of Powers' novels, it proposes a secret history in which real events have supernatural causes and prominent historical figures have been involved in supernatural or occult activities. The novel was shortlisted for the Locus Fantasy Award in 2007 as well as the Mythopoeic Fantasy Award for Adult Literature in the same year.

== Plot ==
The action mostly takes place in Southern California, in a few days during August 1987. Professor of English Frank Marrity is visiting his recently deceased grandmother's house in order to get her affairs in order. To keep his 12-year-old daughter Daphne occupied, he puts her in front of a television set with a VHS videotape of what he thinks is Pee-wee's Big Adventure. When Daphne watches it, she unexpectedly sees a lost and suppressed film created by Charlie Chaplin (A Woman of the Sea, a 1926 film which the real-life Chaplin ordered destroyed for tax purposes). The film activates Daphne's latent psychic abilities. She strikes out pyrokinetically, burning both the tape and her teddy bear in her bedroom upstairs.

This psychic action attracts the attention of foreign agents who know much more about the Marrity family's lives than they do. The agents know Frank's grandmother was Lieserl Maric, the daughter of Albert Einstein, and that she was friends with Chaplin. Einstein, Maric and Chaplin had created a time machine, which Lieserl had kept in a small outbuilding called the Kaleidoscope Shed. A Woman of the Sea was suppressed by Chaplin because it tapped into the same powerful energy as the time machine.

Frank and Daphne meet an old man who introduces himself to Frank as Frank's missing father. In reality, he is an older Frank, from the year 2006, who intends to use the time machine to restore his earlier, happier life.

Old Frank warns young Frank and Daphne not to eat in an Italian restaurant, but they disregard this and go to lunch at Alfredo's. Daphne chokes on a bite of food and Frank performs an emergency tracheotomy, saving her life. When she is hospitalized, they are visited by Oren Lepidopt, a Mossad katsa. While there, he sees a dybbuk appear on the hospital room television and attempt to possess Daphne, but Lepidopt rescues them. Believing his statements, Frank and Daphne join the Mossad team.

Another team, The Vespers, co-opts Frank's brother-in-law, Bennett, to deliver the Marritys to the Vespers for $50,000. Bennett leads them to Grammar's house, but then changes his mind and saves Frank and Daphne from assassination. Frank contacts Lepidopt and tells him how to find the time machine. By a matter of minutes, Lepidopt's team fetches the machine before the Vespers and old Frank can get to it. The Mossad team bring the time machine components to the Wigwam Motel in San Bernardino, California.

Daphne, captured and tied up by the Vespers, uses her mental powers to set their headquarters on fire. They tranquilize her and flee, but Frank's telepathic link has alerted him to what she did. The Mossad agents imprison Frank and Charlotte in the back of their van and head for Palm Springs.

Both teams, using different magical abilities, gradually converge upon each other. The novel climaxes with a shootout at the El Mirador Medical Plaza in Palm Springs. Lepidopt finally gets up the nerve to "jump" but travels back only two minutes in time; still, this is enough for him to change the time-line and save the Marritys, though he dies.

== Characters ==
=== The Marrity Family ===
- Lieserl Maric (1902-1987) - The daughter of Albert Einstein, she renamed herself from the Serbian "Lieserl Maric" to the Irish-sounding "Lisa Marrity." Mother of Derek Marrity, grand mother of Frank and Moira Marrity, and great-grandmother of Daphne Marrity.
- (Young) Frank Marrity (b. 1952) - The 35-year-old protagonist, he is an English professor and is devoted to his daughter, with whom he sometimes has telepathic contact. He falls in love with Charlotte Sinclair, despite the fact that she was commissioned to kill him.
- Daphne Marrity (b. 1975) - Frank's precocious 12-year-old daughter, she has the occasional power of pyrokinesis and is called a poltergeist by some characters.
- (Old) Frank Marrity (b. 1952) - Having time-traveled from 2006 to 1987, his goal is to save his younger self from a life of misery.
- Moira Marrity Bradley - Frank's younger sister, married to Bennett Bradley.
- Bennett Bradley - A movie location scout, he is a bit money-hungry and resentful of Frank, but eventually sides with Frank and Daphne against the Vespers.
- Derek Marrity - Murdered by the Vespers in 1955, he was thought by his children to have abandoned them. His mummified head travels with the Vespers in their bus and can answer certain questions by whispering or via a Ouija board.

=== The Mossad team ===
- Oren Lepidopt - A 40-year-old katsa of the Mossad, his goal is to get the time machine in order to fix certain events in the Six-Day War of 1967.
- Ernie Bozzaris - A 28-year-old member of the Mossad; he is shot to death by Paul Golze.
- Bert Malk - Another Mossad agent.
- Sam Glatzer - A "remote viewer," that is, a psychic who can eavesdrop on conversations many miles away.
- Aryeh Mishal - An elderly agent.

=== The Vespers ===
- Denis Rascasse - A Frenchman, he is leader of the team hunting for the time machine in the United States. He is able to astrally project.
- Paul Golze - A lieutenant to Rascasse, he deals with Old Frank, promising him a deal in return for an explanation of how to find and use the time machine.
- Charlotte Sinclair - Blinded by an accident at the age of 19, she is able, psychically, to see through the eyes of anyone near her.
- Roger Canino - Vespers security chief at their compound in Amboy, California.

== Critical reception ==
Science fiction author James K. Morrow, reviewing the novel for The Washington Post, admired Powers's "brio, bravado and a salutary measure of lunacy" in writing the book, and called it "a beguiling genre omelet, a mélange of forms ranging from alternate history to science fiction, urban fantasy to occult cliffhanger, espionage adventure to Ross Macdonald-style Southern California hardboiled detective thriller."

John Clute writes that the novel is a somewhat farcical "12-step to daylight" in which, happily, "Life is a game which can be played": "In this sounding house of story, a typical Tim Powers plot unfolds. As usual, there is no simple way to do synopsis: Not only are there two opposing Covert Forces attempting to gain control of the Grail-like MacGuffin, which does in the end change the world a few times before evaporating, but the central premise involves time travel, which can never be explained, not really. ... A certain proportion of Three Days is spent perplexing lay readers with exegeses of the theological and practical implications of Einstein's discovery, the time travel maschinchen he concealed after the 1933 disaster..." Clute says that the novel is not exactly clear, yet "the book ends in peace and closure, and it gives joy."

Andrew Santella wrote for The New York Times, "Powers's latest genre-blending thriller (call it an occult/fantasy/espionage/existential adventure with elements of paranoid rant) concerns shadowy groups of international intriguers racing to locate a lost discovery of Albert Einstein's that could quite literally change history. ... Frank Marrity, an English professor, and his 12-year-old daughter, Daphne, stumble on Einstein's secret and scramble to figure out what it means and how to keep it and themselves out of the hands of the mysterious groups—Mossad? the N.S.A.? Evil cabalists?—who are chasing them. Their predicament is about as dire as can be imagined, but it gives Powers's heroes the opportunity to confront their own pasts. You might finish this overstuffed novel still unsure about the connection between Einstein and astral projection, but if you give in to Powers's imaginative leaps and relentless pacing you may find that a mere quibble."

Adam B. Vary of Entertainment Weekly, in a mini-review, gave the novel a B+ grade: "In 1987, a widower dad and his young daughter are thrust into international metaphysical intrigue involving time travel, Jewish mysticism, and Albert Einstein. ... Deeply weird—Charlie Chaplin plays a key role—but it all somehow works in Powers' wily storytelling logic."

Comparing parts of the novel to C. S. Lewis's That Hideous Strength, Madeleine L'Engle's A Wrinkle in Time, and the writings of John le Carré, Graham Greene and Len Deighton, science fiction author John Shirley wrote, "The ride we take in this marvelous novel is glorious and gripping. And if we have a mind-bending panoply of the fantastic to absorb, we feel privileged to pay the price of entry—we accept it all as being part of the 'physics of the metaphysics' of the grimly glorious Powers universe."

Thomas M. Wagner of SFReviews.net, praising "Powers' creative brilliance," wrote, "Powers ingeniously imagines a world in which the most cutting-edge discoveries of physics walk hand in hand with paranormal phenomena, Kabbalist mysticism, and enough weirdness for any five seasons of The X-Files. ... If one were to glean a message from this story, it could be that, as much as we might dream of going back and changing events in our past that have hurt us to one degree or another, the point of life is to move forward through the pain, and not linger on it, tormenting ourselves by never learning lessons or growing as people. A lot of time travel thrillers would root themselves in the gizmo or the gimmick; Three Days to Never is that rare kind of thriller that never loses sight of the humanity beneath the surface."

== Trivia ==
Grammar Marrity's house is located at 204 Batsford Street in Pasadena. Tim Powers's wife Serena's maiden name was Batsford.
