= The Digging Leviathan =

1984 novel by James P. Blaylock

- Cover of the first edition
- Author: James P. Blaylock
- Cover artist: Jim Gurney
- Language: English
- Genre: Science fiction
- Publisher: Ace Books
- Publication date: August 1984
- Publication place: United States
- Media type: Print (Paperback)
- Pages: 276
- ISBN: 0-441-14800-X
- OCLC: 11223486
- Followed by: Homunculus

The Digging Leviathan is a science fiction novel by American writer James P. Blaylock. It was first published in 1984 by Ace Books. The source was Blaylock's first novel The Chinese Circus, which was never finished.

== Plot summary ==
The story is set in 1964 in and around Los Angeles, California. Jim Hastings is a young boy who lives with his uncle, Edward St. Ives; Jim's father suffered a nervous breakdown upon his wife's death and has been institutionalized ever since. Jim is increasingly puzzled by a series of strange events that seem to happen around his friend Giles "Gill" Peach who, like his father and forefathers before him, has gills. The boys are fascinated by pulp science fiction, and Gill begins building a device inspired by the "subterranean prospector" described in Edgar Rice Burroughs' novel At the Earth's Core.

Jim's father William, who periodically escapes the psychiatric facility run by Hilario Frosticos, is convinced that Gill is being manipulated by unscrupulous adventurers allied with Frosticos: a Hollow Earth conspiracy. This is discounted as paranoia by St. Ives, Russell Latzarel, Roycroft Squires, and William Ashbless, all members of the Newtonian Society, an alternative science-oriented social club. However, as events unfold it appears that William's worst fears have a bizarre truth behind them, and the ideas described in Gill's diaries are more than weird tales.

Clues found by William lead St. Ives and Latzarel to sewers connected to an underground river, mermen, bizarre technology, and a longevity serum based on carp. Together with Jim, the four men try to outmaneuver Frosticos in the race to reach a not-quite unimaginable goal.

== Conception ==
Blaylock said about the novel:

By the time I was out of college a year I had a hundred thousand words of it, and it was evident that it could never be finished, because the plot funneled outward for the entire length of the book. A few years later a guy in Long Beach (up the coast) tied a bunch of helium balloons to an armchair and flew into the stratosphere (seriously) [see Lawnchair Larry flight for details on this 1982 incident] and the event was so inspirational that it seemed to me to suggest a focus for my long-abandoned book. I launched it again, immediately forgot about the guy with the balloons, and it turned into The Digging Leviathan.
