= James Blaylock =

American fantasy author

- Born: James Paul Blaylock; September 20, 1950 (age 75); Long Beach, California, U.S.
- Education: California State University, Fullerton (MA)
- Occupation: Writer
- Writing career
- Genres: Fantasy, Science fiction
- Literary movement: Steampunk
- Website: sybertooth.com/blaylock

James Paul Blaylock (born September 20, 1950) is an American fantasy author. He is noted for a distinctive, humorous style, as well as being one of the pioneers of the steampunk genre of science fiction. Blaylock has cited Jules Verne, H. G. Wells, Robert Louis Stevenson, Arthur Conan Doyle and Charles Dickens as his inspirations.

He was born in Long Beach, California; studied English at California State University, Fullerton, receiving an M.A. in 1974; and lives in Orange, California, teaching creative writing at Chapman University. He taught at the Orange County School of the arts until 2013. Many of his books are set in Orange County, California, and can more specifically be termed "fabulism" – that is, fantastic things happen in our present-day world, rather than in high fantasy, where the setting is often some other world. His works have also been categorized as magic realism.

He and his friends Tim Powers and K. W. Jeter were mentored by Philip K. Dick. Along with Powers, Blaylock invented the poet William Ashbless. Blaylock and Powers have often collaborated with each other on writing stories, including "The Better Boy", "On Pirates", and "The William Ashbless Memorial Cookbook".

Blaylock previously served as director of the Creative Writing Conservatory at the Orange County High School of the Arts until 2013, where Powers has also been Writer in Residence.

He has been married to his wife, Viki Blaylock, for more than 40 years. They have two sons.

== Awards ==
Blaylock's short story "Thirteen Phantasms" won the 1997 World Fantasy Award for best Short Fiction. "Paper Dragons" won the award in 1986. Homunculus won the Philip K. Dick award in 1987.

== Bibliography ==
=== The "Balumnia" Trilogy ===
Whimsical fantasy inspired, according to the author, by The Wind in the Willows and The Hobbit.

1. The Elfin Ship (1982)
  - The Man in the Moon (2002) – The original manuscript, initially rejected, from which The Elfin Ship was reworked, with commentary and an additional short story.
2. The Disappearing Dwarf (1983)
3. The Stone Giant (1989)

=== The "Narbondo / St. Ives Universe" Series ===
==== Novels ====
Sharing the character of villain Ignacio Narbondo; The Digging Leviathan and its sequel Zeuglodon are contemporary fantasies set in 1960s California, while the remainder are steampunk novels set in Victorian England.

- Ignacio Narbondo
  - The Digging Leviathan (1984)
  - Zeuglodon (2012; sequel to The Digging Leviathan)
- Langdon St. Ives
  1. Homunculus (1986)
  2. Lord Kelvin's Machine (1992) – Expansion of the eponymous 1985 novelette.
    - "Lord Kelvin's Machine" (1985, novellete) – Expanded into a novel in 1992.
  3. The Ebb Tide (2009)
  4. The Affair of the Chalk Cliffs (2011)
  5. The Aylesford Skull (2013)
  6. Beneath London (2015)
  7. River's Edge (2017, novella)
  8. The Gobblin' Society (2020, novella) (ISBN 978-1-59606-948-0)

==== Short fiction and novellas ====
- "The Ape-Box Affair" (1978)
- "The Idol's Eye" (1984)
- "Two Views of a Cave Painting" (1987)
- "The Hole in Space" (2002)
- The Adventure of the Ring of Stones (2014, novella)
- "Earthbound Things" (2016)
- "The Here-and-Thereians" (2016)

==== Collections ====
All short fiction (except for the novelette Lord Kelvin's Machine) and two novels have appeared in two collections by Subterranean Press:

- The Adventures of Langdon St. Ives (2008) – Omnibus of Homunculus, Lord Kelvin's Machine, and the stories "The Ape-Box Affair", "The Idol's Eye", "Two Views of a Cave Painting", "The Hole in Space".
- The Further Adventures of Langdon St. Ives (2016) – Omnibus of The Ebb Tide, The Affair of the Chalk Cliffs, The Adventure of the Ring of Stones, and the new stories "The Here-and-Thereians" and "Earthbound Things".

=== The Land of Dreams Series ===
- Paper Dragons (1985, novelette)
- Land of Dreams (1987)

=== The "Christian" Trilogy ===
Present-day fantasy using Christian elements, such as the Holy Grail and the thirty pieces of silver paid to Judas.

- The Last Coin (1988)
- The Paper Grail (1991)
- All the Bells on Earth (1995)

=== The "Ghosts" Trilogy ===
Present-day Californian ghost stories.

- Night Relics (1994)
- Winter Tides (1997)
- The Rainy Season (1999)

=== Other novels ===
- The Magic Spectacles (1991) – Young adult book.
- The Knights of the Cornerstone (2008) (ISBN 9780441016532)
- Pennies from Heaven (2022)

=== Collections ===
- 13 Phantasms (2000) – Short story collection.
- On Pirates (2001) – Short story collection with Tim Powers.
- In for a Penny (2003) – Short story collection.
- The Devils in the Details (2003) – Short story collection with Tim Powers.
- Metamorphosis (2009)
- The Shadow on the Doorstep (2009) – Short story collection.

=== Other publications ===
- The Complete Twelve Hours of the Night (1986) – Joke pamphlet co-written by Tim Powers and published by Cheap Street Press.
- "Home Sweet Home" and "Postscript to Home Sweet Home" (2012) – Nonfiction essays included in A Comprehensive Dual Bibliography of James P. Blaylock & Tim Powers (ISBN 9780976748601).

=== Critical studies and reviews of Blaylock's work ===
- "Review: The Ring of Stones" – Heck, Peter (February 2015). "On Books". Asimov's Science Fiction. 39 (2): 108.
