= Tim Powers =

American science fiction and fantasy author (born 1952)

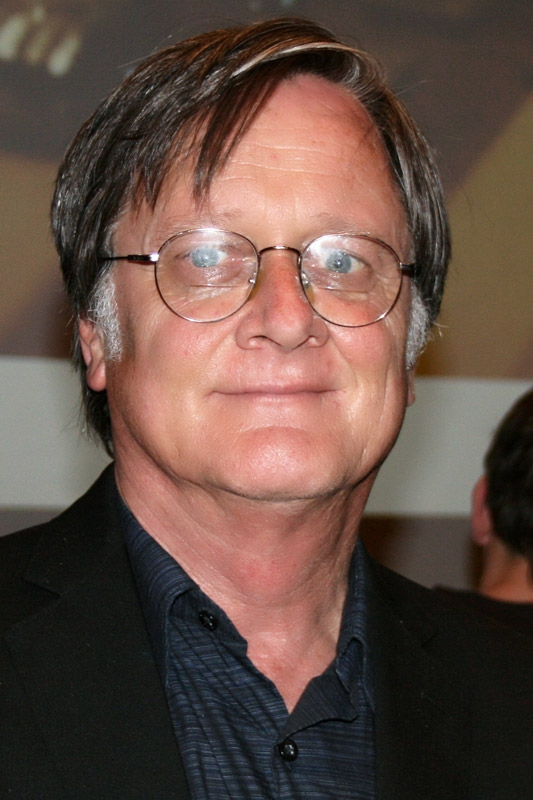
- Powers celebrating his 61st birthday in 2013
- Born: February 29, 1952 (age 74); Buffalo, New York, U.S.
- Education: California State University, Fullerton
- Occupation: Writer
- Spouse: Serena Batsford
- Writing career
- Pen name: William Ashbless (joint)
- Period: 1976–present
- Genres: Adventure fiction, speculative fiction
- Movement: Steampunk
- Website: www.facebook.com/AuthorTimPowers/

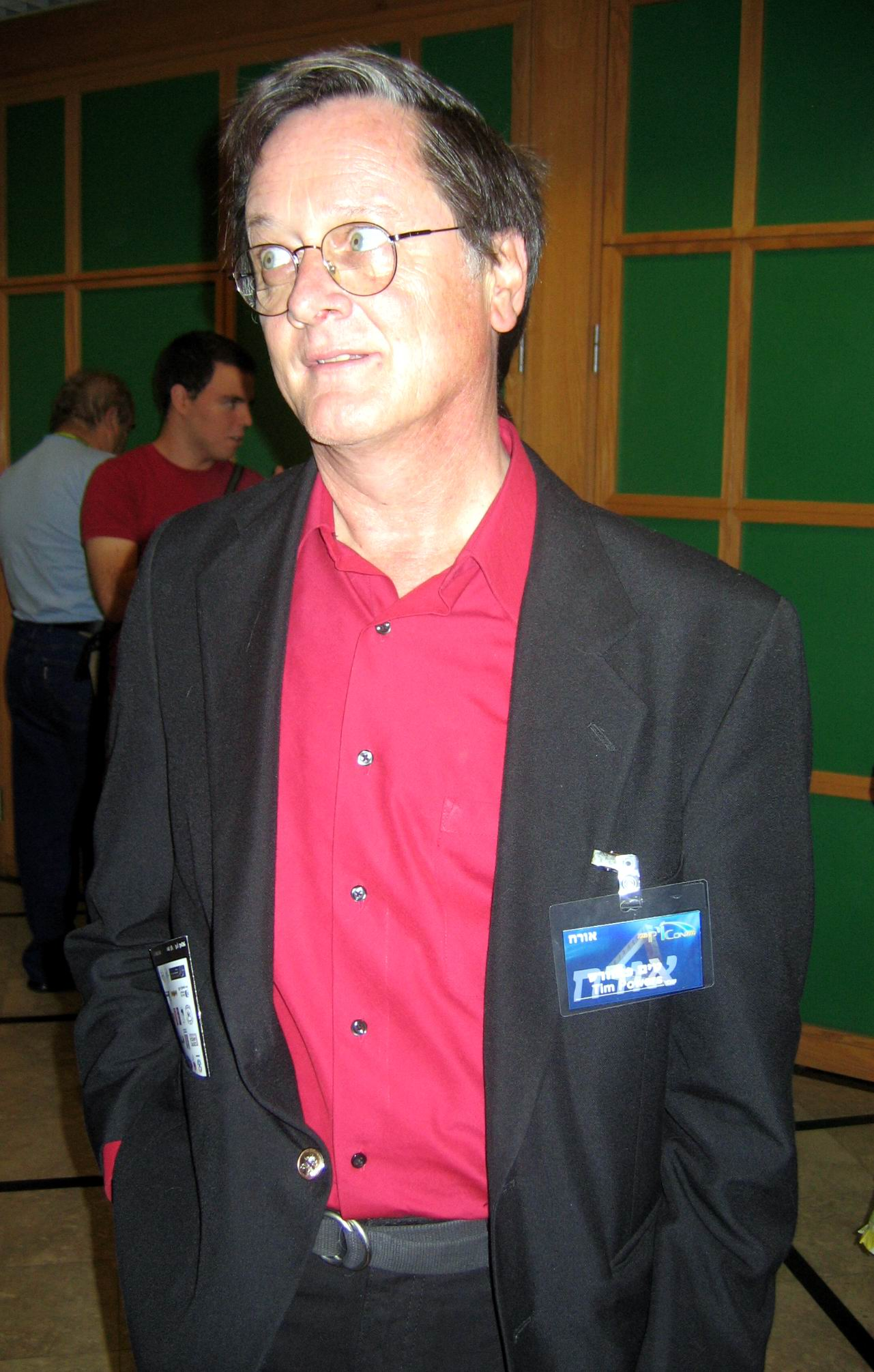
Powers at the annual ICon festival, a fan convention in Israel, October 2005

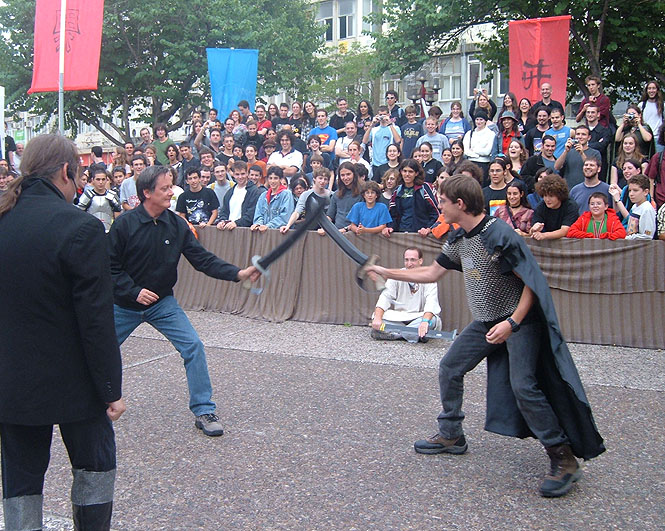
Powers in the "Koloseum" at ICon 2005

Timothy Thomas Powers (born February 29, 1952) is an American science fiction and fantasy author. His first major novel was The Drawing of the Dark (1979), but the novel that earned him wide praise was The Anubis Gates (1983), which won the Philip K. Dick Award, and has since been published in many other languages. His other written work include Dinner at Deviant's Palace (1985), Last Call (1992), Expiration Date (1996), Earthquake Weather (1997), Declare (2000), and Three Days to Never (2006). Powers has won the World Fantasy Award twice for his critically acclaimed novels Last Call and Declare. His 1987 novel On Stranger Tides served as inspiration for the Monkey Island franchise of video games and was partly adapted into the fourth Pirates of the Caribbean film.

Several of Powers's novels depict historical events being influenced by occult or supernatural factors. Regarding his 2001 novel Declare, Powers stated, "I made it an ironclad rule that I could not change or disregard any of the recorded facts, nor rearrange any days of the calendar – and then I tried to figure out what momentous but unrecorded fact could explain them all."

== Life and career ==
Powers was born in Buffalo, New York, but has lived in California since 1959. Powers has described himself as a practicing Catholic. He studied English Literature at Cal State Fullerton, and earned his B.A. in 1976. It was there that he first met James Blaylock and K. W. Jeter, both of whom remained close friends and occasional collaborators; the trio have half-seriously referred to themselves as "steampunks" in contrast to the prevailing cyberpunk genre of the 1980s. Powers and Blaylock invented the poet William Ashbless while they were at Cal State Fullerton.

Another friend Powers first met during this period was noted science fiction writer Philip K. Dick; the character named "David" in Dick's novel Valis is based on Powers. When Do Androids Dream of Electric Sheep? was retitled Blade Runner to tie-in with the movie based on the novel, Dick dedicated it to Tim and Serena Powers.

Powers's first major novel was The Drawing of the Dark (1979), but the novel that earned him wide praise was The Anubis Gates, which won the Philip K. Dick Award, and has since been published in many other languages.

Powers also teaches part-time in his role as Writer in Residence for the Orange County High School of the Arts and California School of the Arts in San Gabriel Valley in the Creative Writing Conservatory, as well as Chapman University, where Blaylock taught. He also taught part-time at the University of Redlands. In 2024, Powers would be a recipient of the Inkpot Award at the annual San Diego Comic Con.

Powers and his wife, Serena Batsford Powers, currently live in Muscoy, California. He has frequently served as a mentor author as part of the Clarion science fiction/fantasy writer's workshop.

== Bibliography ==
=== Novels ===
- The Skies Discrowned (1976), published by Laser Books, ISBN 0373720289. Revised and republished in 1986 as Forsake the Sky by Tom Doherty Associates, ISBN 0812549732.
- An Epitaph in Rust (1976)
- The Drawing of the Dark (1979)
- The Anubis Gates (1983): Philip K. Dick Award winner, 1983; Locus Fantasy Award nominee, 1984; BSFA nominee, 1985
- Dinner at Deviant's Palace (1985): Philip K. Dick Award winner, and Nebula Award nominee, 1985. Dave Langford's review for White Dwarf #92 stated "Sizzling entertainment: but the sudden triumph over alien omnipotence doesn't quite convince."
- On Stranger Tides (1987): Locus Fantasy and World Fantasy Awards nominee, 1988 Disney incorporated elements of the novel into the fourth Pirates of the Caribbean film.
- The Stress of Her Regard (1989): Locus Fantasy and World Fantasy Awards nominee, 1990 and winner of the 1990 Mythopoeic Fantasy Award.
- Fault Lines series

- Last Call (1992): Locus Fantasy and World Fantasy Awards winner, 1993
- Expiration Date (1996): World Fantasy Award nominee, 1996; 1996 Nebula Award nominee
- Earthquake Weather (1997): BSFA Award nominee, 1997; Locus Fantasy Award winner, 1998

- Declare (2001): World Fantasy Award winner and Locus Fantasy nominee, 2001; 2001 Nebula Award nominee
- Powers of Two (2004): Re-release of The Skies Discrowned and Epitaph in Rust.
- Three Days to Never (2006): Locus Fantasy Award nominee, 2007
- Hide Me Among the Graves (2012)
- Medusa's Web (2016)
- Vickery and Castine series

- Alternate Routes (August 2018)
- Forced Perspectives (March 2020)
- Stolen Skies (January 2022)

- My Brother's Keeper (2023)
- The Mills of the Gods (2025)

=== Short story collections ===
- Night Moves and Other Stories (2000)
- On Pirates, by James P. Blaylock and Powers as William Ashbless (2001)
- The Devils in the Details (with James Blaylock) (2003)
- Strange Itineraries: 2005, published by Tachyon Publications of San Francisco, California (includes all six stories from Night Moves plus both stories by Powers from Devils)
- The Bible Repairman and Other Stories: 2011, published by Tachyon Publications
- Down and Out in Purgatory: The Collected Stories of Tim Powers: 2017, published in hardcover and ebook editions by Baen Books in November 2017. Becky Spratford in Booklist called the book "a treat for fans and newbies alike; hand it to readers who enjoy genre-blending authors as varied as Jim Butcher, Dean Koontz and China Miéville."

=== Other ===
- The Complete Twelve Hours of the Night (1986): A joke pamphlet by Blaylock and Powers as William Ashbless, published by Cheap Street Press; features in The Anubis Gates
- A Short Poem by William Ashbless (1987): A joke chapbook written by Phil Garland, with permission of Blaylock and Powers as Ashbless. Published by The Folly Press.
- The William Ashbless Memorial Cookbook (2002): A cookbook by Blaylock and Powers as Ashbless. Published by Subterranean Press.
- The Bible Repairman (2005): A chapbook containing an original short story. Published by Subterranean Press.
- Nine Sonnets by Francis Thomas Marrity (2006): A chapbook containing nine sonnets "written" by one of the main characters in Three Days to Never. Published by Subterranean Press and given away with the collectors' edition of Three Days To Never.
- A Soul in a Bottle (2007): A ghost story about a poet largely based on American poet Edna St Vincent Millay. This novella was published by Subterranean Press.
- Three Sonnets by Cheyenne Fleming (2007): Printed loose and inserted into the collectors' edition of A Soul in a Bottle.
- Death of a Citizen (2012): A short nonfiction essay included in A Comprehensive Dual Bibliography of James P. Blaylock & Tim Powers by Silver Smith. Published by Argent Leaf Press.
- Salvage and Demolition (2013): Time-travel novella. Published by Subterranean Press.
- Nobody's Home (2014): novella set in the world of The Anubis Gates.
- Appointment at Sunset (2014): Published by Charnel House
- Down and Out in Purgatory (2016): A ghost story about posthumous revenge. This novella was published by Subterranean Press.
- More Walls Broken (February 2019): novella published by Subterranean Press.
- After Many a Summer (2023): novella published by Subterranean Press.

=== Critical studies and reviews of Powers's work ===
Salvage and Demolition

- Di Filippo, Paul (August 2013). "On Books". Asimov's Science Fiction. 37 (8): 107–111.
