= Heir of Sea and Fire =

1977 novel by Patricia A. McKillip

- First edition cover
- Author: Patricia A. McKillip
- Cover artist: Michael Mariano
- Language: English
- Series: The Riddle Master Trilogy
- Genre: Fantasy
- Publisher: Atheneum Books
- Publication date: July 1977
- Publication place: United States
- Media type: Print (Hardback & Paperback)
- Pages: 204
- ISBN: 0-689-30606-7
- OCLC: 2874466
- LC Class: PZ7.M19864 He
- Preceded by: The Riddle-Master of Hed
- Followed by: Harpist in the Wind

Heir of Sea and Fire is a 1977 fantasy novel by American writer Patricia A. McKillip, the second book of the Riddle Master trilogy.

== Plot summary ==
The focus shifts from the previous protagonist of Morgon of Hed to Raederle of An. Raederle, the titular heir of sea and fire, was promised by her father to the man who won a riddle game with a ghost. In the previous book, this was revealed to be Morgon. As the book opens, Morgon has been missing for a year; he is presumed dead, as the land-rule he possessed over the land of Hed has passed on to his heir.

Raederle sets out for Erlenstar Mountain, which Morgon was trying to reach when he disappeared. Along the way, she is assisted by Lyra, the Morgul of Herun's heir, and by Morgon's sister. Along the way, Raederle grows to understand her own significant powers as a descendant of both shapechangers and witches. Her ancestry makes her related to Morgon's enemies. Midway through the story, Reaerle discovers that Morgon is alive, with both shapechangers and Ghisteslwchlohm, an ancient, traitorous and extremely powerful wizard, pursuing him.

Sensing a powerful force pursuing her, Raederle uses her abilities to confound it, thinking she is protecting Morgon; but discovers that the force she thought was Ghisteslwchlohm is Morgon himself, who had stolen much of Ghisteslwchlohm's power during his long captivity, while the helpless man he pursued was Deth, who had betrayed him. Confronted with this, and realizing how he appears, Morgon forsakes his revenge and allows Deth to escape.
