= Mdivani =

Georgian family

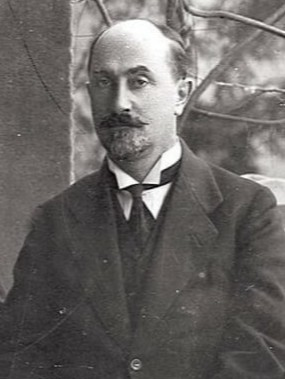
Simon Mdivani, politician and Georgian ambassador to the Ottoman Empire

The Mdivani family (Georgian: მდივანი) is a Georgian noble family with the rank of aznauri (untitled nobility). Outside of Georgia, the family is best known for the five children of General Zakhari Mdivani, who became known as the "Marrying Mdivanis" after fleeing the Soviet invasion of Georgia and marrying into wealth and fame.

== History ==
Outside of Georgia, the best known bearers of this name were the children of General Zakhari Mdivani (1867–1933), who served as the aide-de-camp to the Tsar of Russia, and his Georgian-Polish wife, Elizabeth Viktorovna Sabalewska (1884–1922), a socialite and close friend of Rasputin. The five siblings fled penniless to France and the US after the Soviet invasion of Georgia in 1921, and became known as the "Marrying Mdivanis", as they all married into wealth and fame. They were a media staple of their time and are often regarded as pioneers of the modern concept of the "lifestyle celebrity." Their phenomenon was analyzed by Dale Carnegie in his landmark book How to Win Friends and Influence People, with some calling it the "Mdivani Spell". F. Scott Fitzgerald, author of The Great Gatsby, referenced the Mdivani as a symbol of celebrity at the time; food dishes and fashion styles were named after them; and they even came up in a U.S. congressional hearing in 1935. British biographer Ralph Hewins, known for his works on J. Paul Getty, had planned to publish a biography of the Mdivani family based on decades of research, but family events ultimately halted the project.

The Mdivani siblings were:

Denis Conan Doyle and Nina Mdivani

- Nina Mdivani (1901–1987), was married to Charles Henry Huberich, a professor and lawyer, from 15 July 1925 until their divorce on 19 May 1936. On 18 August 1936, she married Denis Conan Doyle, a son of Sir Arthur Conan Doyle, the creator of Sherlock Holmes. Together with the Conan-Doyle family, she helped manage the Sherlock Holmes estate until Denis's death in India on 9 March 1955, during a hunting trip at the invitation of the Maharaja of Mysore. She then married Harvard educated poet Anthony 'Tony' Harwood, who later served as a secretary to Denis Conan Doyle. Tony was homosexual and served as a mentor (and possibly more) to the English artist and film maker Derek Jarman. Together, they would dress in drag and drape each other in Nina's many and fabulous jewels. Later, Nina Mdivani and Harwood acquired the Sherlock Holmes estate through an elaborate scheme and ran it until Harwood's death in 1976. Nina had numerous stories and articles published throughout her life, including a series of Georgian folk tales (Le Matin, 1924), the highly acclaimed piece 'There is No Age' in Queen Magazine, and 'Tribute to Womanhood', which was praised by newspapers as "one of the truest tributes to womanhood in modern English literature." Nina was close friends with Toto Koopman; Duchess of Bedford, who admired Nina's most beautiful collection of turquoise in the world; Barbara Cartland who said Nina 'is the last of the fabulous personalities in a world of mediocre nonentities'; and Helena Rubinstein, who characterised Nina as 'the salt of the earth!’. The great designers of her era created dresses for her, with her favorite being Balenciaga, who always personally sent her red roses. Nina had an orchid named after her in 1948 (Rhyncholaeliocattleya Princess Nina Mdivani), made appearances in Vogue and posed for Andy Warhol's iconic Polaroid series in 1973. She died on 19 February 1987 in London.
- Serge Mdivani (1903–1936), together with brother David were sent to the prestigious Phillips Academy in Andover, Massachusetts, with the support of their father's close friend Marshall Crane of the Crane Currency paper empire. By 1923, the brothers worked in the Oklahoma oil fields owned by Edward L. Doheny. Serge later moved to Los Angeles where he met and married Hollywood's original 'femme fatale', actress Pola Negri, in 1927. Pola famously stated, "I did love my first husband Count Domski, I adored Rudolph Valentino, and I grew very fond of Charlie Chaplin. But Serge means more to me than them all". After relocating to France to start a family away from Hollywood, Pola suffered a miscarriage. The added stress of losing her fortune in the Wall Street crash of 1929 and her desire to return to acting led to the couple's separation. Although they briefly reconciled, they ultimately went through a highly publicized divorce, after which Serge quickly married the world-famous soprano Mary McCormic. She notably remarked – "American men do not comprehend leisure because they are not versed, like the Mdivanis, in ways of spending it. Neither do they understand the art of spending in the grand manner...and in love-making, their technique was certainly unrivaled by any of the bloods of Southampton or Sands Point." Regarding the next development, American journalist and author Alice-Leone Moats once observed: 'Though nothing the Mdivanis could do would have surprised me, this seemed such an outlandish development that I put it down to some columnist's overheated imagination.'. After divorcing Mary, in 1936 Serge married his former sister-in-law Louise Astor Van Alen Mdivani. Tragedy struck just five weeks after the wedding when he died in a freak polo accident in Delray Beach, Florida. He is buried in the churchyard of St. Columba's Episcopal Chapel in Middletown, Rhode Island under a massive marble tombstone.
- David Mdivani (1904–1984), was the first Mdivani to marry a Hollywood star. He came to the U.S. with his brother Serge to study at the Phillips Academy in Andover and later moved to New York where he was working for a radio repair shop owned by a fellow Georgian refugee Mr Loladze on Vesey Street in New York City. David also dabbled in acting, appearing in 1927 short film A Small Town Princess alongside Billy Bevan. In 1926 David married Hollywood superstar and pioneering female producer Mae Murray with Rudolph Valentino as his best man. Mae hailed David as "the most fascinating man in Hollywood". They had a son, Koran David (1926–2018), whose existence remained a secret until Jim Mitchell of the Los Angeles Examiner received a tip from a friend. Rumours circulated about Koran's biological parents, as Mae was never seen pregnant in public. The couple divorced in 1933 in a highly publicized trial, mirroring the marital developments of his brother. He was subsequently involved in a series of high-profile relationships, including with actress Rose Davies, sister of Marion Davies, Argentine film actress Mona Maris, socialite Muriel (Johnson) "Honey" Berlin, and others. He had a long affair with French actress Arletty, who was rumored to have been pregnant by David in 1939. David finally married Sinclair Oil heiress Virginia Sinclair (daughter of Harry Ford Sinclair) in 1944, and they had a son, Michael (1945–1990). They divorced after David accused Virginia of having a lesbian affair with Virginia Kent Catherwood, a wealthy divorcée and former lover of novelist Patricia Highsmith. Akin to Rubirosa and his infamous association with a large pepper mill, David was similarly reputed, with descriptions likening him to something as monumental as the Empire State Building. David was the founder and president of the Pacific Shore Oil Company with many Hollywood film celebrities as shareholders. David died of a heart attack on 5 August 1984 and was buried in Los Angeles.
- Isabelle Roussadana Mdivani (1906–1938), aka Roussie or Roussy. An accomplished sculptor, she was famous for making busts of celebrities, including US President Calvin Coolidge, Prince Henry of the Netherlands, ballet legend Serge Lifar, philanthropist William E. Harmon, Hollywood matinée idol Sessue Hayakawa, US Secretary of State Charles Evans Hughes, American actress Kay Francis, Noe Zhordania and many others. She had three items accepted at the most important art event in Europe, the Spring Salon of the Académie des Beaux-Arts in Paris at the age of 17 and designed the Lafayette Escadrille aviation trophy. In 1928, she married the Spanish painter Josep Maria Sert, who was known as the 'Tiepolo of the Ritz,' and would go to produce the famed large-scale works at Waldorf-Astoria and the Rockefeller Center. At the time of their first meeting, Josep was married to the 'Queen of Paris' and arts patron Misia Sert. The three of them were said to live together in a ménage à trois, causing a sensation across Paris. This affair inspired Jean Cocteau's 1940 play Les Monstres sacrés, Alfred Savoir's play Maria and Chanel's fashion style 'Trio'. Roussy was known for her eccentricities, often accompanied by a monkey dressed in Oriental attire and dressing in a hippie-style (long before hippies existed), though an elegant "Chanel version" of it. She was labelled as one of the 'three reigning beauties in Paris' at the time and was photographed by Man Ray, Cecil Beaton, Horst P. Horst, André Durst, George Hoyningen-Huene, François Kollar with appearances in Vogue and Harper's Bazaar. Roussy was a close friend of French author Colette, Schiaparelli associate Bettina Bergery, Coco Chanel, who found in Roussy 'her ideal model in the tall, elegant girl who wore clothes with such nonchalant distinction' and Salvador Dalí, who said that Roussy was one of the most interesting women he'd ever met. Roussy never recovered from the death of her brother Alexis and spent her final years sailing the Mediterranean with her husband and friends aboard her yacht, St. Alexis, named in his memory. She died in a clinic in Lausanne at the age of thirty-three. The haute couture collectible doll Mdvanii, created by artist and Andy Warhol muse BillyBoy*, was inspired by Roussy, who appeared to him in a dream. Chanel's lip colour 426 Roussy is named after Roussy Mdivani.
- Alexis Mdivani (1908–1935) aka Alec, the youngest of the siblings, received a private education in England with the support of his sister Nina. His first reputed sexual encounter was with French superstar Mistinguett at the age of fourteen, followed by affairs with American actress Kay Francis, African-American dancer Louise Cook (known as "Snake Hips"), socialite Evelyn Clark, and a romance-turned-friendship with bi-racial, bi-sexual Vogue cover model and later spy Toto Koopman. His greatest love was Silvia Rodriguez de Rivas, daughter of the Spanish Count of Castilleja de Guzmán. Their plans to marry were thwarted by her father, who set her up with Count Henri de Castellane in what was described as an arranged marriage. Upon hearing news of the impending wedding, Alexis married his best friend Jimmy Van Alen's sister Louise Astor Van Alen (a member of the Astor and Vanderbilt families).They divorced a year later after she allegedly caught Alexis and her close friend, Woolworth heiress Barbara Hutton, in a romantic encounter at Roussy's estate in Costa Brava, Spain (rumored to have been orchestrated by Roussy herself). Alexis married Barbara Hutton in 1933, one of the world's richest women at the time in what was described as the most publicized and photographed weddings in modern times. Like his brothers before him, the couple sparked a media frenzy with scandalization of their lavish lifestyle including their palazzo Abbazia di San Gregorio in Venice, yacht Ali Baba (named from the combination of their names), extravagant jewelry (Mdivani-Hutton jadetite necklace later sold for record breaking $27.4mn at Sothebys) and parties. The hospitality pioneer Marie-Louise Ritz stated that Mdivani party was one of the greatest triumphs in the history of the Ritz. After their divorce in 1935, Alexis was romantically linked to numerous women including Maharani of Cooch-Behar, reputedly the richest woman in India, American actress Kay Francis and 23-year-old German Baroness Maud Thyssen, whom he planned to marry after her divorce from industrialist and art collector Heinrich Thyssen. Alexis was an accomplished polo player who led the successful team Les Diables, known for numerous international victories, and owned a stable of 30 polo ponies. He left a legacy of having had done much to encourage polo in France. He was deeply involved in Georgia related charitable causes, sponsoring numerous initiatives worldwide, and was even considered to lead the Georgian and White émigré movement aimed at toppling the communist regime in the Soviet Union He died at the age of 27 in Albons, Catalonia, Spain, while speeding in his Rolls-Royce during a trip with Baroness Maud Thyssen.

In late feudal Georgian the word "mdivani" meant "an official" such as one who attends court and participates in the consideration of a case.

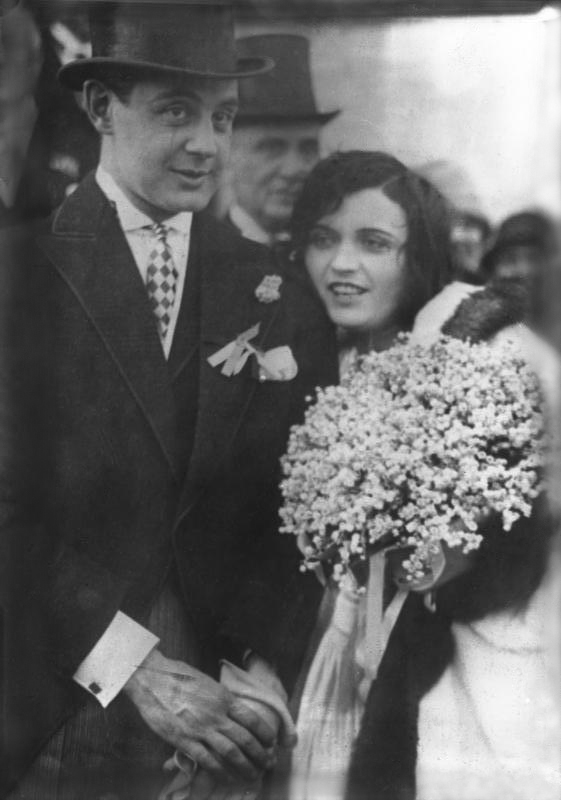
Serge Mdivani and Pola Negri in May 1927

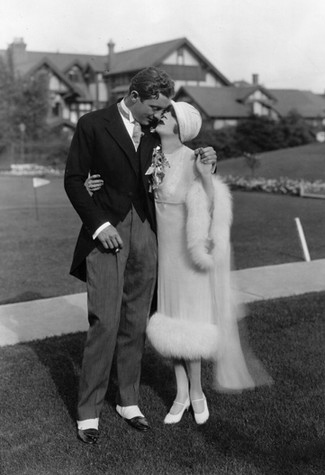
David Mdivani and Mae Murray in 1926

== Notable members ==
- Marina Mdivani, Soviet and Canadian virtuoso pianist of Georgian descent
- Polikarp Mdivani, Georgian Bolshevik and Soviet government official
