= 12th Congress of the Russian Communist Party (Bolsheviks) =

1923 meeting in Moscow

The 12th Congress of the Russian Communist Party (Bolsheviks) was held during 17–25 April 1923 in Moscow. The congress elected the 12th Central Committee. It was attended by 408 delegates with deciding votes and 417 with consultative votes, representing 386,000 party members. This was the last congress of the Russian Communist Party (Bolsheviks) (RCP(b) during Vladimir Lenin's leadership, though Lenin was unable to attend due to illness.

== Agenda ==
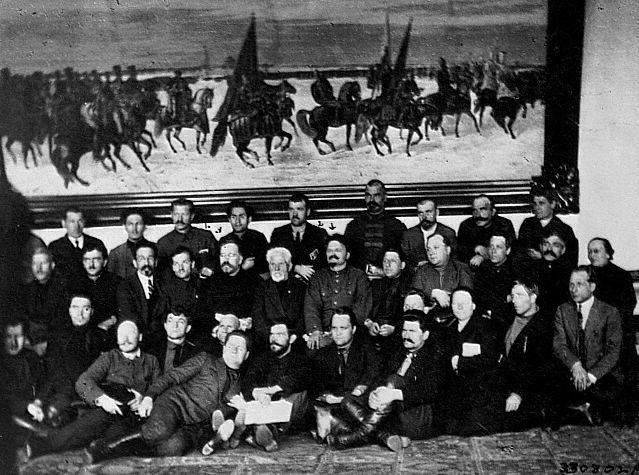
L.Kamenev and L.Trotsky with delegates of the Congress

- The Central Committee political report (Grigory Zinoviev)
- The Central Committee organizational report (Joseph Stalin)
- Report of the Auditing Commission (Viktor Nogin)
- Report of the Central Control Commission (Matvei Shkiryatov)
- Report of the Russian representation in the Comintern Executive Committee (Nikolai Bukharin)
- About industry (Leon Trotsky)
- National (ethnic-based) issues in party and state development (Stalin)
- Tax policy in rural areas (Lev Kamenev, Mikhail Kalinin, Grigory Sokolnikov)
- About establishment of districts (raions) (Alexei Rykov)
- Elections of the Party's central offices

== Brief overview ==
Much of this Congress was taken up with Joseph Stalin's struggle against the Georgian Bolshevists. Stalin dominated the Congress with Sergo Ordzhonikidze and Mamia Orakhelashvili, moving against the Old Bolsheviks Polikarp Mdivani and Filipp Makharadze. Stalin accused the latter of the following:

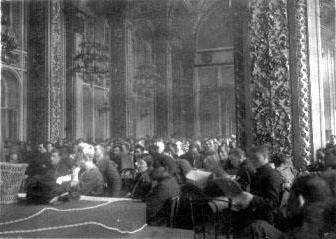
Meeting hall during the last day of the Congress

- "violation of party discipline", namely contact Lenin directly not through party channels;
- "disobeying decisions of the Central Committee of the RCP(b)";
- "demanding special economic concessions for Georgia";
- "local chauvinism" and "imperialism" as they were accused of oppressing smaller nations such as the Ossetians and Abkhazians, and,
- "the desire to obtain privileged positions for Georgians".

Ordzhonikidze went further:

- "collaboration with Mensheviks during 1918–1920";
- "retaining class enemies (landlords) in the Georgian Communist Party";
- "granting political amnesty to Mensheviks", and,
- "leftism" and "adventurism".

== Aftermath ==
Mirsäyet Soltanğäliev attended this Congress, but he was subject to attack immediately afterwards in the Tartar newspaper Eshche and arrested during May 1923. He was roundly condemned by Stalin at the Fourth Conference of the Central Committee of the Russian Communist Party (b) with the Workers of the National Republics of the Regions, held 9–12 June 1923.

At this Congress, the RCP(b) redefined the problems of nationalism identifying local chauvinism as the main problem rather than Great Russian chauvinism. The Congress was the beginning of the so-called policy of Korenizatsiya. The main idea was to grow national cadres for every nationality so that the party line could be pursued everywhere by representatives of the local nationality and the national proletariat could be raised against its own exploiters.
