= Shalva Eliava =

Georgian Old Bolshevik and Soviet official

Shalva Zurabovich Eliava
- შალვა ელიავა
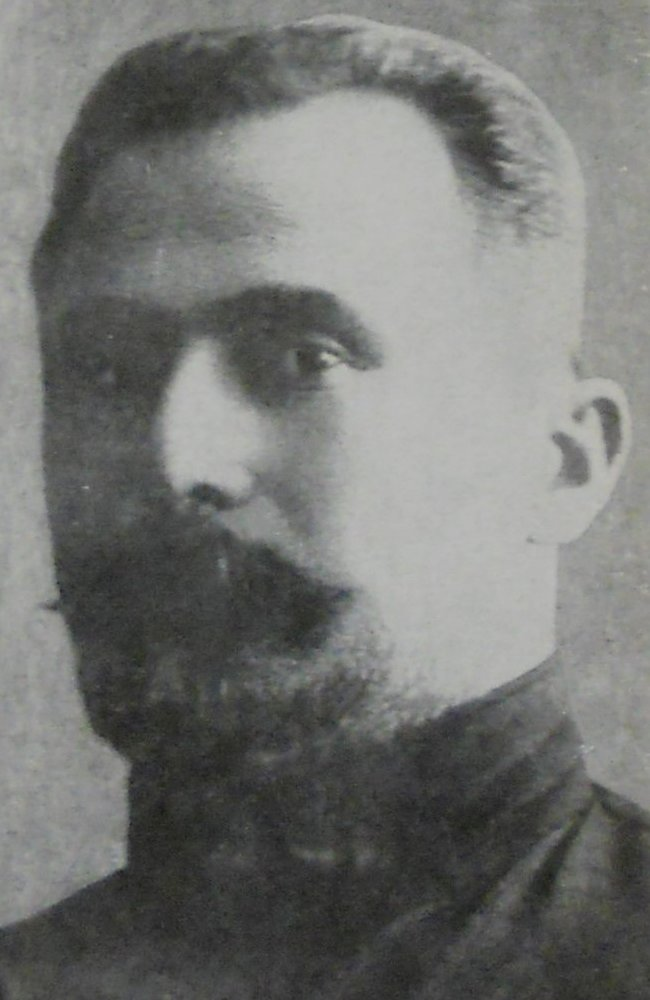
- Shalva Eliava in 1923
- Born: September 30, 1883
- Died: December 3, 1937 (aged 54)
- Education: Kutaisi classical gymnasium

Shalva Zurabovich Eliava (Georgian: შალვა ელიავა; Russian: Ша́лва Зура́бович Элиа́ва, Shalva Zurabovich Eliava) (September 30, 1883 in Ganiri – December 3, 1937) was a Georgian Old Bolshevik and Soviet official who contributed to the Sovietization of Central Asia and Caucasus but fell victim to Joseph Stalin’s Great Purge.

== Early years ==
Eliava was born into an impoverished noble family from western Georgia. At the age of eight he was sent to the Kutaisi classical gymnasium. According to Eliava himself, it was in the gymnasium and under the influence of his older brother Niko that he became involved with revolutionary ideas:

In the senior classes of the gymnasium, I became interested in social issues. The Kutaisi gymnasium was notable for the abundance of all kinds of circles, including the Marxist one. I was directly influenced by my older brother, then a student at Moscow University, and by those revolutionaries whom I happened to meet through my brother. These revolutionaries included... Mikha Tskhakaya and the late Alexander Tsulukidze, who was already a serious Marxist theorist then. I entered the university already infected with revolutionary ideas, though not yet fully formed. From the autobiography of Shalva Eliava

After graduating from high school in 1903, he entered the law faculty of Saint Petersburg Imperial University, where in his first year of study he met many members of the Russian Social Democratic Labour Party and assisted the party by storing illegal literature. In February 1904 he took part in a student demonstration. In the summer of 1904 he went home for the holidays.

== Revolutionary career ==
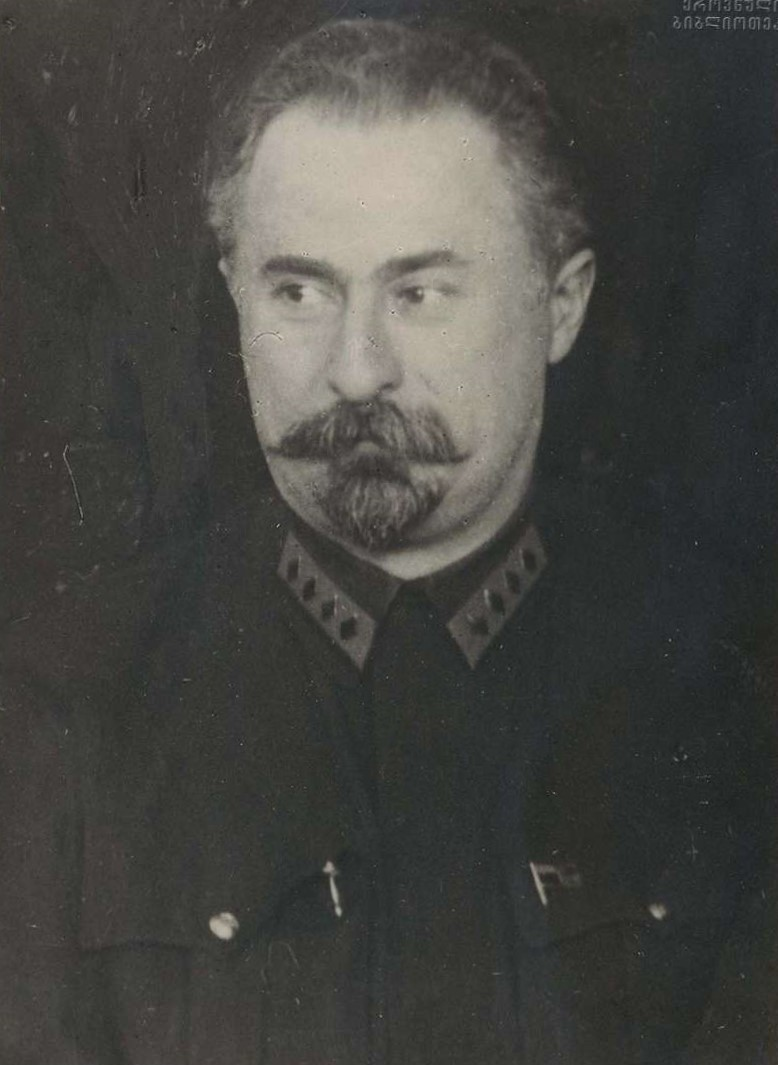
Eliava

Eliava did not return to the university that fall. At the end of 1904 he joined the Bolshevik wing of the Russian Social Democratic Labour Party. In January 1905, he was arrested on the eve of a strike in Tiflis. However, he was quickly released and went to the Kutaisi province, where he was engaged in agitation and propaganda activities until August 1905. In August he returned to Tiflis and took an active part in the October strike of 1905, being a member of the strike committee from the Bolshevik faction. After the suppression of the December uprising in Moscow and the liquidation of the second strike in the Caucasus, he was again arrested and released only at the end of February 1906. In April 1906 he was again arrested and released in the autumn of 1906. After that, he decided to resume his studies at Saint Petersburg University.

At the university he continued to engage in revolutionary activities and participated in student strikes. In September 1906, he first met Vladimir Lenin. After participating in a student strike in 1908, he went underground. In 1909, on the eve of the demonstration planned for May 1, the tsarist police destroyed the Bolshevik printing house where Eliava worked and arrested him along with his associates.

A month and a half later, he was released, but in June 1909 he was again arrested and soon expelled from the capital. With great difficulty in the fall of 1909, Eliava managed to obtain permission to travel to Saint Petersburg to take state exams. However, he failed to pass the exams, because in November he was subjected to another arrest.

On November 11, 1910, he was one of the organizers of a major political demonstration on the day of Leo Tolstoy's funeral. For this, the very next day he was arrested and placed in a pre-trial detention center for four months. After that, he was sent into exile for three years to the Olonets Governorate.

In 1912, due to illness, he was transferred to the town of Chyorny Yar in Astrakhan Governorate. Here he resumed his revolutionary activities, contacting the local Social Democrats, participating in the work of the provincial Bolshevik organization, maintaining contact with the center and Transcaucasia, and receiving illegal literature, including the newspaper Pravda.

At the end of his exile in March 1913, he returned to Saint Petersburg in order to raise funds for Pravda. Then he moved to Kutaisi for four months, where he conducted agitation and propaganda work, and in November 1913 he moved to Tiflis. However, in Tiflis he was attacked by gendarmes and a week later he was forced to move to the Kutaisi Governorate. After staying in Kutaisi for several months, he returned to St. Petersburg. At the beginning of 1914, he was sent by the party organization to work in the sickness fund at the Triangle factory, whose secretary he remained until April 1915. In addition, at the same time he was an employee of Pravda. In the fall of 1914, he was arrested and after four months in prison was sentenced to deportation to the Yenisei Governorate. However, due to illness, he was sent to the Astrakhan province, and in December 1915 he moved under police supervision to Vologda, where he worked in the cooperative association Severo-Soyuz, while meeting with local and exiled leftists and with railway workers.

== Revolution and Civil War ==
After the February Revolution, Eliava decided to stay in Vologda and took a direct part in the establishment of the Vologda Provincial Council of Workers' and Soldiers' Deputies. On March 15, 1917, at the first meeting of the council, he was elected its chairman, despite the fact that it was dominated by representatives of the Mensheviks and Socialist Revolutionary Party. The Council under his leadership cooperated with the provisional authorities in Vologda, and Eliava himself supported defencism and pacifism. However, according to his memoirs, after the July crisis and the Kornilov revolt, he lost faith in defencism, characterizing it as "worthless and harmful illusions".

On November 7 and 8, 1917 Eliava participated in the work of the Second All-Russian Congress of Soviets of Workers' and Soldiers' Deputies, at which the historically important first decrees of Soviet power were approved. After returning to Vologda on November 26, 1917, he was again delegated to the Vologda Provincial Council of Workers' and Soldiers' Deputies, and at the council itself was elected chairman of the Vologda Provincial Executive Committee of the Council. On December 18, 1917, he participated in the provincial congress of the RSDLP, at which the creation of a Bolshevik organization in the Vologda province was formalized.

After the unification of the Soviet of Workers' and Soldiers' Deputies with the Soviet of Peasants' Deputies, the chairman of the provincial executive committee of the united council was elected and, on his behalf, on January 23, 1918, proclaimed the establishment of Soviet power in the Vologda province. In January–April 1918, he was the chairman of the Vologda Ispolkom ("executive committee").

In March 1918, Eliava participated in the work of the Fourth Extraordinary All-Russian Congress of Soviets, at which the Treaty of Brest-Litovsk was approved.

In April 1918, after the First Vologda Provincial Congress of Soviets of Workers', Soldiers' and Peasants' Deputies, he became provincial commissar for food and headed the food authorities of the Vologda province. In this position, he actually introduced a military regime in the field of food procurement, organized food detachments and pursued an active policy of requisitioning surplus grain, which often caused widespread discontent among the local population. He remained at the post of commissar of the regional food committee until December 1918. Eliava moved to Moscow in December 1918 to serve as a member of the board of the People's Commissariat of Trade and Industry, headed by Leonid Krasin.

On February 12, 1919, a special (temporary) commission of the Council of People's Commissars for the affairs of Turkestan was created. Eliava was appointed chairman of the Turkocommission. However, Turkestan at that time was cut off from Central Russia by the Civil War, and the roads there were under the control of the White Guards of Alexander Kolchak. Therefore, the commission first stopped in Samara, then in Orenburg. In addition, because of Kolchak's offensive, the activities of the Turkocommission were temporarily curtailed, and Eliava himself was temporarily forced to engage in propaganda work among the population of the Volga and Ural cities.

In October 1919, after the success of the Red Army in Turkestan, he focused his activities on the chairmanship of the Turkocommission, which was entrusted with the party leadership in Turkestan. In January 1920, the Turkocommission took a direct part in the creation of the Communist Party of Turkestan (CPT). In August 1920, the Turkocommission was disbanded, and its activities as a party body were continued by the Turkestan Bureau of the Central Committee of the RCP(b). Eliava also became a member of that body.

Soon he was appointed a member of the Revolutionary Military Council of the First Army, then became a member of the Revolutionary Military Council of the Southern Army Group of the Red Army Eastern Front, commanded by Mikhail Frunze. In this position, he was involved in both the direct planning and command of military operations, and the mobilization of the population.

== Leadership in Soviet Georgia and the Caucusus ==
During the war with the Democratic Republic of Georgia early in 1921, he was a member of the Caucasus bureau of the Russian Communist Party as well as a member of the Military Revolutionary Council for the 11th Red Army, which spearheaded the Soviet conquest of Georgia. On February 25, 1921, the combined forces of the Red Army and the Revolutionary Committee of Georgia, which was created to legitimize the occupation of independent Georgia, captured Tiflis and proclaimed the formation of the Georgian Soviet Socialist Republic.

After the overthrow of the Democratic Republic of Georgia, Eliava was the deputy chairman of the Georgian Revcom. As long as Revcom chairman Filipp Makharadze was not in Georgia, Eliava actually performed the duties of the chairman.

In 1921–1923 he was the People's Commissar of Military and Naval Affairs of the Georgian SSR, and in 1922–1923 he held the same position in the Transcaucasian SSR. From January 1923 to June 1927, he was a head of the Soviet Georgian government as chairman of the Council of People's Commissars of the Georgian Soviet Socialist Republic.

He was one of the initiators of the unification of the Transcaucasian republics, which took place on December 10–13, 1922 at the first Transcaucasian Congress of Soviets. At the congress, it was decided to unite the Georgian, Armenian and Azerbaijan SSRs into the Transcaucasian Soviet Federative Socialist Republic. Eliava supported the aggressive efforts to integrate Georgia and the other Caucasus republics into the Soviet Union that led to the Georgian Affair, in which Joseph Stalin and Sergo Ordzhonikidze overcame the opposition of the moderate Georgian leadership, as well as Lenin and Leon Trotsky.

In Georgia itself Eliava pursued a policy of liquidating the remnants of the "anti-Soviet" parties. In addition, a purge of the state apparatus was organized, including the bodies of the Cheka, the police and the prosecutor's office. Starting in the autumn of 1924, he openly criticized Trotsky and, within the Georgian Communist Party, fought against "Trotskyism". At the Fifth Congress of the Communist Party of Transcaucasia in 1927 Eliava and his supporters managed to finally oust the inner-party opposition. In March 1932 the Central Executive Committee of the TSFSR awarded Eliava the Order of the Red Banner of Labor for "strengthening Soviet power in Transcaucasia".

After the 14th Congress of the All-Union Communist Party (Bolsheviks), which was called the "Congress of Industrialization", Eliava actively supported the development of industry and industrialization of Georgia. During 1927 to 1930, when he served as the chairman of the Council of People's Commissars of the TSFSR and chairman of the Supreme Economic Council of the republic, the Zemo-Avchalskaya, Shovskaya, Onskaya, Abashskaya and Nukhinskaya hydroelectric power stations were built and the construction of the Rionskaya, Dzoragetskaya and Verkhne-Zurnabadskaya hydroelectric power stations began. Eliava also supported the cooperative movement and the construction of schools, technical schools, institutes, cultural, educational and medical institutions.

In the field of agrarian policy, Eliava was a supporter of the creation of large collective farms in Transcaucasia and specialization in certain crops, and he wanted to turn the region itself into the largest Soviet center for animal husbandry and fruit growing.

And if we use electrical energy in our country, if we irrigate the vast steppes of Azerbaijan, which can give about 1,100 hectares for cotton as a result of irrigation work, if we drain our wetlands in the humid subtropical region in Georgia, which can give over 200 hectares for subtropical crops, for medicinal plants, if agriculture is armed with appropriate mechanical means, then Transcaucasia can move at a much faster pace than other regions of our union ... Transcaucasia should turn into Soviet socialist Florida and California along the line of fruit growing ... We have, comrades, the possibility of developing animal husbandry and along the line of pig breeding, and along the line of wool sheep breeding, and along the line of large dairy cattle, in which Transcaucasia at one time occupied first place in Russia and second place in Europe.

From the speech of Sh.Z. Eliava at the 16th Congress of the CPSU(b).

== Sovietization of Central Asia ==
In May and August 1922, Eliava traveled to Turkestan, where he participated in the Sovietization of Central Asia, propaganda among the local population, elimination of the Basmachism and restoration of the national economy. Subsequently, for his activities in Turkestan, he was awarded two Orders of the Red Banner: in 1928, on the proposal of the Central Executive Committee of the Turkmen Soviet Socialist Republic, and in 1932, on the proposal of the Central Executive Committee of the Uzbek Soviet Socialist Republic.

== Foreign affairs ==
In 1920, he served as Soviet Russia’s plenipotentiary in Turkey and Northern Persia. He was unable to actually travel to Turkey because of a serious bout of typhus, but nonetheless participated in negotiations with Atatürk's movement on behalf of Soviet Russia. He also established personal contacts with representatives of workers and communists and with state and military figures of Turkey and Persia and spoke to the parliament in Tehran. As a plenipotentiary, on September 1, 1920, he took part in the Congress of the Peoples of the East, held in Baku.

In 1921, together with Alexander Svanidze, he signed the Treaty of Kars, which ceded the Artvin region to Turkey while retaining the Batumi and Adjara regions, subject to a promise to maintain local autonomy for the largely Muslim population there.

In 1931 he was appointed Deputy People's Commissar for Foreign Trade of the USSR. Eliava took an active part in meetings, receptions, and negotiations with other nations that began to establish diplomatic relations with the USSR and conclude trade agreements with it. During these years the country's active trade balance was positive for three years in a row (1933, 1934, 1935).

== All-Union activities ==
On May 13, 1925, he was a member of the Presidium at the Third All-Union Congress of Soviets. He took part in the 12th through 17th Congresses of the Communist Party of the Soviet Union and was elected as a candidate member of the Central Committee of the CPSU(b) at the 15th, 16th and 17th Congresses. In addition, he was elected to the Central Executive Committee of the USSR.

In 1936–37 he was the Deputy People's Commissar of Light Industry. In this position, he paid special attention to the development of new technology and the recruitment of light industry workers. The same years saw the Stakhanovite movement in light industry.

== Arrest, execution and rehabilitation ==
On May 17–19, 1937, at the Plenum of the Central Committee, he, along with Mamia Orakhelashvili, was accused of knowing about "the counter-revolutionary work of the Georgian Trotskyist center, but hiding it from the Central Committee" and was expelled from the Central Committee of the party. He was arrested shortly thereafter. During the investigation, he was accused of participating in the creation of a "counter-revolutionary group of the right" in Georgia in 1928, which was allegedly organized by the directive of Alexei Rykov and Nikolai Bukharin.

The organization worked to knock together counter-revolutionary personnel for sabotage, espionage, sabotage and maintained contact with Bukharin, Rykov and the Ukrainian center of the right, with which it was agreed on a simultaneous armed uprising in Ukraine and in the republics of Transcaucasia at the time of the outbreak of war ... In 1935, under the directive Rykov, transmitted through Eliava, the republican centers established contacts for a joint struggle against the party and the Soviet government with all the counter-revolutionary groups and organizations in Transcaucasia – Trotskyists, Mensheviks in Georgia, Dashnaks in Armenia and Musavatists in Azerbaijan ... In fact, a united front of struggle against the party and Soviet power from all anti-Soviet forces inside Georgia and Transcaucasia ... All this bastardy was a monstrous interweaving of spies, traitors, wreckers, saboteurs, persons with the most diverse counter-revolutionary views and convictions, but united by bestial hatred for the leadership of the CPSU(b) and vile desire to overthrow the Soviet power.

From a note by L.P. Beria to I.V. Stalin about “counter-revolutionary” groups in Georgia.

The defendants in the case were also accused of establishing ties with England, France and Nazi Germany, and also trying to use terror against the leadership of the CPSU(b) and the government both in the center and in the field. During the interrogation, Eliava confessed that he was an agent of the French, British and German intelligence services and one of the leading employees of the counter-revolutionary terrorist-sabotage organization of the right in Georgia.

In Moscow, he kept in touch with Bukharin, who gave him a directive to organize terrorist acts against Comrade Stalin, Molotov, Voroshilov, Kaganovich. Eliava also maintained a close relationship with Gamarnik and Tukhachevsky, knew about the composition of the Ph.D. center of military organization, its work. At the suggestion of Tukhachevsky, Eliava agreed to transfer to the German General Staff all espionage information of interest to him about the state of the Georgian units of the Red Army, about the situation in Georgia and other materials received by him for this purpose from G. Mgaloblishvili and Sh. Matikashvili.

From a note by L.P. Beria to I.V. Stalin about the “counter-revolutionary” groups in Georgia

On December 3, 1937, Sh. Z. Eliava was shot. Until the 20th Congress of the CPSU, his name was not mentioned at all in Soviet publications[1]. He was rehabilitated by the Soviet Communist Party in 1956.

== Honors ==
Knight of the Order of the Red Banner and the Red Banner of Labour.

== Literature ==
- (in Russian) Шалва Зурабович Элиава. The Great Soviet Encyclopedia entry on Shalva Eliava.
- Suny, Ronald Grigor (1994), The Making of the Georgian Nation, pp. 214, 235, 251–2, 276, 380, 388. Indiana University Press, ISBN 0-253-20915-3.
