= Hewins (surname) =

Hewins is a surname, and may refer to:

- Amasa Hewins (1795–1855), American portrait, genre and landscape painter
- Caroline Hewins (1846–1926), American librarian
- Mark Hewins (born 1955), British jazz guitarist
- Mary Hewins (1914–1986), British working woman whose oral history was the subject of a history from below biography
- Ralph Hewins (1909–1984), British biographer
- Rob Hewins (born 1958), British drummer for Showaddywaddy and formerly Martin Turner's Wishbone Ash
- William Hewins (1865–1931), British economist and Conservative politician
