= Polikarp Mdivani =

Georgian government official

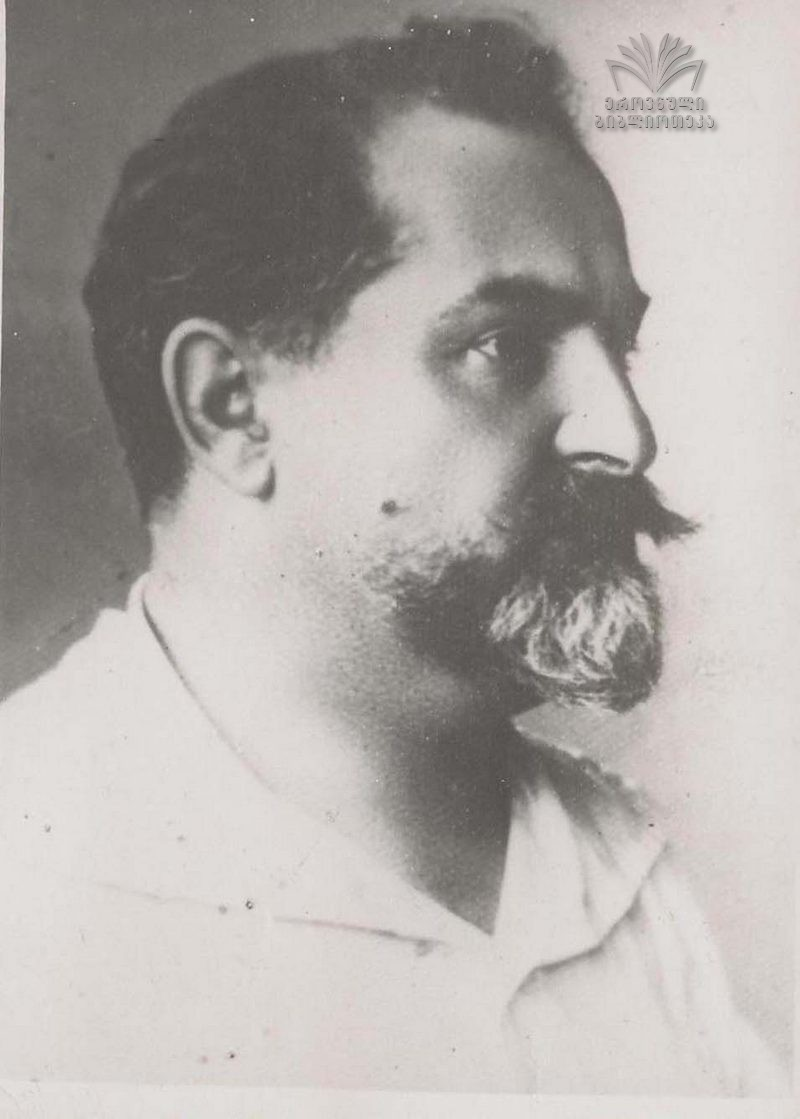

Polikarp "Budu" Gurgenovich Mdivani (Georgian: პოლიკარპე [ბუდუ] მდივანი; Russian: Поликарп Гургенович [Буду] Мдивани, Polikarp Gurgenovich [Budu] Mdivani; 1877 – 19 July 1937) was a veteran Georgian Bolshevik and Soviet government official energetically involved in the Russian Revolutions and the Civil War. In the 1920s, he played an important role in the Sovietization of the Caucasus, but later led Georgian Communist opposition to Joseph Stalin's centralizing policy during the Georgian Affair of 1922. He was executed during the Great Purge.

== Early life ==
He was born in to an Aznauri (untitled noble) family in the Kutaisi Governorate. He was brother of Simon Mdivani. Polikarp enrolled in the Imperial Moscow University but was later expelled from the university for his participation in the student riots of 1899.

== Revolution and Civil War ==
Mdivani joined the Bolshevik faction of the Russian Social Democratic Labour Party in 1903 and engaged in revolutionary activities in Tbilisi, Baku, Batumi, and other industrial centers of the Caucasus. A close associate of Joseph Stalin, he quickly emerged as one of the leading Bolsheviks in the region and gained a reputation of a brilliant orator.

During the Russian Civil War, that followed the Russian Revolution of 1917, he was commissioned to the Caucasus Front where he worked for the Caucasian Bureau of the Central Committee of the Bolshevik Party and served as a member of the Revolutionary Military Council of the 11th Army. In 1920, he was instrumental in the occupation of the Democratic Republic of Azerbaijan. Later that year, he was sent as a special envoy to Turkey in an effort to mediate a peace deal between the Turkish government and the Democratic Republic of Armenia.

Early in 1921, Mdivani, along with Stalin and Sergo Ordzhonikidze, played an important role in engineering the Red Army invasion of Georgia which toppled down the local Menshevik-dominated government in favor of the Bolshevik regime. However, with the establishment of the Georgian SSR, Mdivani emerged as one of the leading proponents of the republic's sovereignty from Moscow. He protested against a series of territorial rearrangements in Transcaucasia that dispossessed Georgia of several of its former districts and advocated more tolerance towards political opposition to ensure the survival of the highly unpopular Bolshevik government.

== The Georgian Affair ==
On 7 July 1921 Filipp Makharadze, a moderate Georgian Communist leader, was removed from his position of the chairman of the Georgian Revolutionary Committee (Revkom) and replaced with Mdivani. During his tenure, Mdivani entered in a bitter conflict with Stalin and Ordzhonikidze who pursued hardliner, centralizing policy towards Georgia. This dispute known as the Georgian Affair peaked in 1922, when Mdivani and his comrades – Makharadze, Mikhail Okudzhava, Sergey Kavtaradze, and Shalva Eliava – were denounced by Stalin as "national deviationists". The Mdivani group, in their turn, accused their opponents of "Great Russian chauvinism" and tried to secure Lenin’s support. Although this was not immediately successful, over the course of 1922 and 1923, Lenin grew more supportive of the Georgian group and repeatedly denounced Great Russian chauvinism, criticizing the "imperialist attitude" among his colleagues. In early March 1923, he wrote a letter to Mdivani and Makharadze in support of their case. However, mere days later, Lenin was incapacitated by a series of strokes.

The "deviationists"’ failure to prevent the Georgian SSR from being amalgamated with the Armenian and Azerbaijan republics into the Transcaucasian SFSR resulted in the final victory of the Stalin-Ordzhonikidze line and the removal of Mdivani from his post in January 1923.

The "national deviationists" were not actively persecuted until the late 1920s, however. After the incapacitation and subsequent death of Lenin, Stalin used his increasing power to remove Mdivani and other oppositionists to diplomatic posts. Mdivani served as the Soviet trade representative to France from 1924 until being excluded, in 1928, from the Communist Party of the Soviet Union during Stalin's crackdown on the Left Opposition. Reinstated three years later, he worked in various government positions, including as chairman of the Supreme Sovnarkhoz, People's Commissar of Light Industry and first deputy chairman of the Georgian Council of People's Commissars between 1931 and 1936. He remained an outspoken critic of Stalin's Transcaucasian enterprise and was famous for his sarcastic comments on the Soviet leader. According to the modern historian Ami Knight, Mdivani liked to tell a joke about how Georgian workers urged Lavrentiy Beria to set up an armed guard around the house of Stalin's mother, Ekaterina Geladze, in Tbilisi so that she would not give birth to another Stalin.

== Repression ==
Stalin could not forgive Mdivani for his defiance and Mdivani became one of the first victims of the Great Purges. He was removed from his post and excluded from the party in late 1936. In May 1937, Mdivani was accused by Beria of having founded the "Trotskyite Centre for Espionage, Sabotage and Terrorism" with the aim to kill Beria and bring down the Soviet government. In July he was arrested and tried by the NKVD troika. During the interrogations at the Metekhi prison in Tbilisi, Mdivani repeatedly refused to "confess". He is quoted to have said to the troika members:

"Being shot is not enough punishment for me; I need to be quartered! It was me who brought the 11th Army here [in Tbilisi]; I betrayed my people and helped Stalin and Beria, these degenerates, enslave Georgia and bring Lenin’s party to its knees."

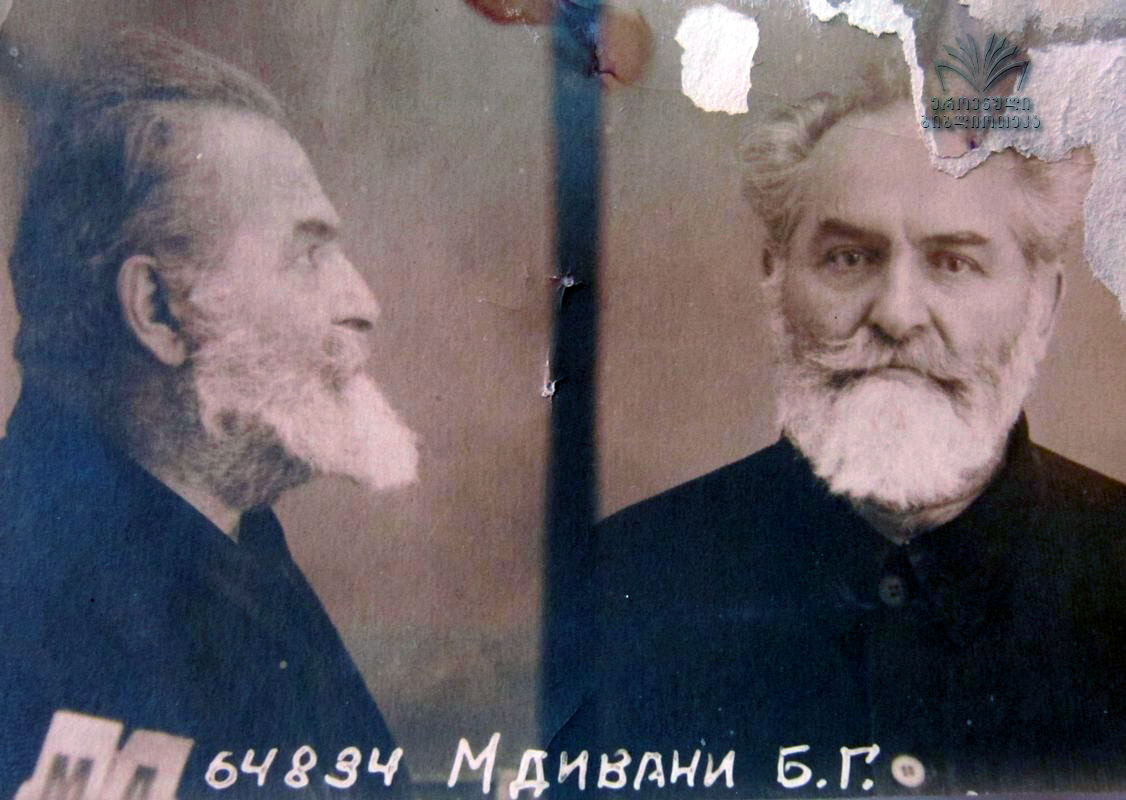
Budu Mdivani in 1937

On 11 July 1937 the Soviet newspaper Zaria Vostoka, with the headline of "Death to Enemies of the People", announced that the Georgian Supreme Court found Mdivani, Okudzhava and several of their colleagues guilty of treason and other counterrevolutionary crimes all categorized under Article 58 of the Criminal Code. On 19 July Mdivani was executed in Tbilisi. His wife and sons, including the notable tennis player Archil Mdivani (1911–1937), and daughter Meri (Mary) were also shot. Meri left a newborn son, David Kobakhidze, with the neighbor when she was taken away for questioning. Before being executed she had a chance to write a letter to him that was the only object he had from his mother. [source?]
