= Georgian affair =

1922 Soviet leadership conflict

The Georgian affair of 1922 (Russian: Грузинское дело, romanized: gruzinskoye delo) was a political conflict within the Soviet leadership about the way in which social and political transformation was to be achieved in the Georgian SSR. The dispute over Georgia, which arose shortly after the forcible Sovietization of the country and peaked in the latter part of 1922, involved local Georgian Bolshevik leaders, led by Filipp Makharadze and Budu Mdivani, on one hand, and their de facto superiors from the Russian SFSR, particularly Joseph Stalin and Grigol Ordzhonikidze, on the other hand. The content of this dispute was complex, involving the Georgians' desire to preserve autonomy from Moscow and the differing interpretations of Bolshevik nationality policies, and especially those specific to Georgia. One of the main points at issue was Moscow's decision to amalgamate Georgia, Armenia and Azerbaijan into Transcaucasian SFSR, a move that was staunchly opposed by the Georgian leaders who urged for their republic a full-member status within the Soviet Union.

The affair was a critical episode in the power struggle surrounding the sick Vladimir Lenin, whose support Georgians sought to obtain. The dispute ended with the victory of the Stalin-Ordzhonikidze line and resulted in the fall of the Georgian moderate Communist government. According to historian Jeremy Smith, it also contributed to a final break between Lenin and Stalin, and inspired Lenin's last major writings.

== Background ==
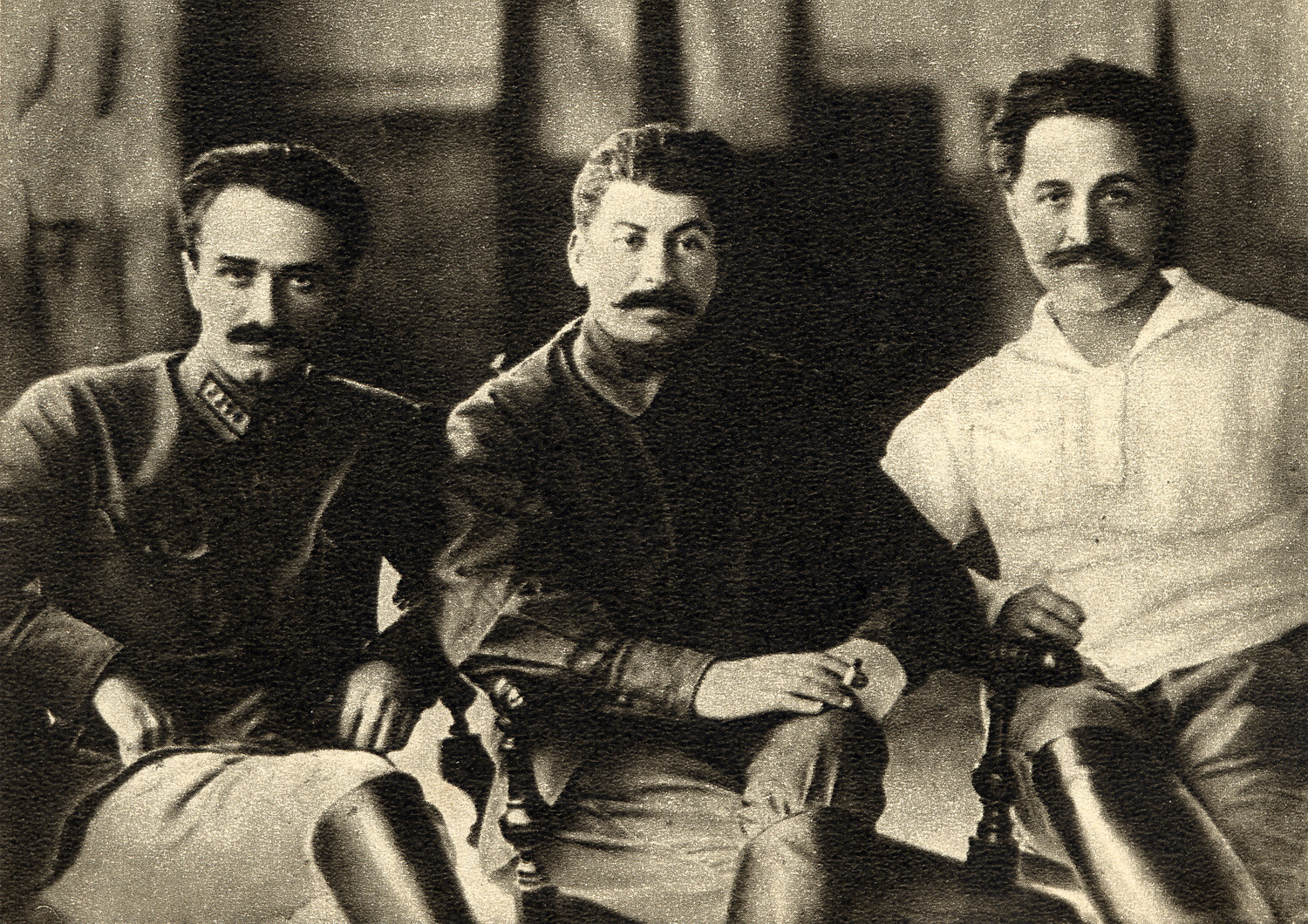
Anastas Mikoyan, Joseph Stalin and Grigol Ordzhonikidze in Tiflis (now Tbilisi), in 1925.

=== Marxism and the "National Question" ===
In 1848, Karl Marx wrote in The Communist Manifesto that "the working men have no country," and over the next several decades Marxist thinkers such as Rosa Luxemburg, Karl Kautsky, Otto Bauer, Vladimir Lenin, and Joseph Stalin would continue to engage with the question of how to relate a class-based worldview to the existence of nations and nationalism, reaching sometimes starkly different conclusions.

These questions began to take on an increasingly urgent political character in the aftermath of the overthrow of the government of Tsar Nicholas II and its replacement with the new Soviet government.

==== Stalin's views on the National Question ====
In his earliest school years in Georgia, Stalin (born Ioseb Jughashvili) had felt a connection to emerging Georgian nationalism, in part as a reaction against a policy of imperial Russification present in the seminary he attended while studying for the orthodox priesthood.

By 1904, however, influenced by Marxist writings, Stalin had moved toward repudiation of independent Georgian nationalism, as he outlined in his essay The Social-Democratic View on the National Question.

Stalin developed his views further in his 1913 pamphlet Marxism and the National Question. The essay describes nationalism as an important force to be reckoned with that historically had arisen in tandem with the rise of capitalism and had gained a great deal of momentum in Russian border regions (including Georgia) following the fall of the tsarist autocracy, and attempted to strike a balance between a right of national self-determination as a legitimate response to oppressor chauvinism while also recognizing the potentially exploitative uses of nationalism as a means to divide the working class, to engage in actual oppression, or to cling to what Stalin viewed as outmoded cultural totems (derisively citing "such 'national peculiarities' of the Georgians as the vendetta!" as an example); similarly, it attempted to strike a balance between adherence to principles and the need to temporize according to particular circumstances.

In the same essay, Stalin specifically describes problems related to "cultural-national" autonomy in the Caucasus region, including Georgia, referring to the possible organization both within and beyond that territory of ethnically defined institutions, objecting in part that such a project would be bound to failure by the region's kaleidoscopic ethnic diversity and also that it might lead to power-grabs by what he viewed as "reactionary" religious leaders.

By 1917, partly as a result of these efforts, Stalin became the recognized expert within the Russia Bolshevik Party on the National Question, and had risen to position of Commissar of Nationalities in the new Soviet government.

=== Diplomatic backdrop ===
The establishment of the new RSFSR in 1917 (and, especially, the conclusion of the Polish–Soviet War) touched off a flurry of diplomatic activity. Initially, relations between the Russian SFSR and other Soviet Socialist Republics were governed by a series of bilateral treaties, a state of affairs that the top Bolshevik leadership regarded as undesirable and unsustainable over a long period of time.

Shortly before the 10th Party Congress in March 1921, Stalin published theses emphasizing his view of the non-viability of bilateral treaties as a long-term solution, writing "Not one Soviet republic taken separately can consider itself safe from economic exhaustion and military defeat by world imperialism. Therefore, the isolated existence of separate Soviet republics has no firm basis in view of the threats to their existence from the capitalist states....The national Soviet republics that have freed themselves from their own and from the foreign bourgeoisie will be able to defend their existence and conquer the united forces of imperialism only by joining in a close political union."

The terms under which different SSRs might be incorporated into some larger body with the RSFSR was, however, the subject of much debate.

=== Bolshevik takeover of Georgia ===
Soviet rule in Georgia was established by the Soviet Red Army during the February–March 1921 military campaign that was largely engineered by the two influential Georgian-born Soviet officials, Joseph Stalin, then People's Commissar for Nationalities for the RSFSR, and Grigol Ordzhonikidze, head of the Transcaucasian Regional Committee (Zaikkraikom) of the Russian Communist Party. Disagreements among the Bolsheviks about the fate of Georgia preceded the Red Army invasion. While Stalin and Ordzhonikidze urged the immediate Sovietization of independent Georgia led by the Menshevik-dominated government, Trotsky favored "a certain preparatory period of work inside Georgia, in order to develop the uprising and later come to its aid". Lenin was unsure about the outcome of the Georgian campaign, fearful of the international consequences and the possible crisis with Kemalist Turkey. Lenin finally gave his consent, on February 14, 1921, to the intervention in Georgia, but later repeatedly complained about the lack of precise and consistent information from the Caucasus. Well aware of widespread opposition to the newly established Soviet rule, Lenin favored a reconciliatory policy with Georgian intelligentsia and peasants who remained hostile to the militarily imposed regime. However, many Communists found it difficult to abandon the methods used against their opposition during the Russian Civil War and make adjustment to the more flexible policy. For moderates like Filipp Makharadze, Lenin's approach was a reasonable way to secure for Soviet power a broad base of support. They advocated tolerance toward the Menshevik opposition, greater democracy within the party, gradual land reform and, above all, respect for national sensitivities and Georgia's sovereignty from Moscow. Communists like Ordzhonikidze and Stalin pursued a more hard-line policy: they sought to eliminate political opposition and centralize party control over the newly Sovietized republics.

Conflict soon broke out between the moderate and hard-line Georgian Bolshevik leaders. The dispute was preceded by Stalin's ban on formation of the national Red Army of Georgia, and subordination of all local workers' organizations and trade unions to the Bolshevik party committees. Dissatisfied by the Soviet Georgian government's moderate treatment of the political opposition and its desire to retain sovereignty from Moscow, Stalin arrived in Tbilisi, capital of Georgia, in early July 1921. After summoning a workers' assembly, Stalin delivered a speech outlining a program aimed at elimination of local nationalism, but was booed by the crowd and received hostile silence from his colleagues. Within the days that followed, Stalin removed the Georgian Revolutionary committee chief Makharadze for inadequate firmness and replaced him with Polikarp Mdivani, ordering local leaders to "crush the hydra of nationalism". Makharadze's supporters, including the Georgian Cheka chief Kote Tsintsadze and his lieutenants, were also sacked and replaced with more ruthless officers Kvantaliani, Atarbekov, and Lavrentiy Beria.

== Conflict over confederation ==
Within less than a year, however, Stalin was in open conflict with Mdivani and his associates. One of the most important points at issue was the question of Georgia's status in the projected union of Soviet republics. Over the objections of other Georgian Bolsheviks, Grigol Ordzhonikidze in late 1921 had set in motion the formation of a union of all three Transcaucasian republics—Armenia, Azerbaijan, and Georgia—as a means of resolving simmering territorial and ethnic disputes, and with Stalin's strong backing insisted that this federation join the Soviet Union together as one federative republic. The Georgian Central Executive Committee, particularly Mdivani, vehemently disagreed with this proposal, desiring their country to retain a stronger individual identity and enter the union as a full member rather than as part of a single Transcaucasian SFSR. (Ordzhonikidze's proposal, however, was passed at a Georgian Party Congress with support of rank-and-file delegates.) Stalin and his aides accused the Georgian Central Executive Committee of selfish nationalism and labeled them as "national deviationists". On their part, the Georgian Central Executive Committee responded with charges of "Great Russian chauvinism". On October 21, 1922, Mdivani contacted Moscow to berate Ordzhonikidze in harsh terms. The same day, Lenin sent a telegram rebuking Mdivani, upholding Stalin's position, and expressing his strong support for the political and economic integration of the Transcaucasian republics, informing the Georgian leaders that he rejected their criticism of Moscow's bullying tactics.

The conflict peaked in November 1922, when Ordzhonikidze resorted to physical violence with a member of the Mdivani group and struck him during a verbal confrontation. The Georgian leaders complained to Lenin and presented a long list of abuses, including the notorious incident involving Ordzhonikidze.

== Lenin's involvement ==
In late November 1922, Lenin dispatched the VeCheka chief Dzerzhinsky to Tiflis to investigate the matter. Dzerzhinsky sympathized with Stalin and Ordzhonikidze and, hence, tried to give Lenin a significantly smoothened picture of their activities in his report. However, Lenin's doubts about the conduct of Stalin and his allies around the Georgian question mounted. He was also afraid of negative outcry that might ensue abroad and in other Soviet republics. In late December 1922, Lenin accepted that both Ordzhonikidze and Stalin were guilty of the imposition of Great Russian nationalism upon non-Russian nationalities.

Nevertheless, Lenin's misgivings over the Georgian problem were not fundamental and, as his health deteriorated, the Georgian leaders were left without any major ally, watching Georgia being pressed into the Transcaucasian federation that signed a treaty with the Russian SFSR, Ukraine and Belarus, joining them all in a new Soviet Union on December 30, 1922.

The Politburo decision of January 25, 1923 concerning the removal of Mdivani and his associates from their posts represented a conclusive victory for Ordzhonikidze and his backers.

== Conflicting accounts of Lenin's reaction ==
Lenin's reaction following Ordzhonikidze's takeover is a matter of dispute revolving around attribution of three letters and one Pravda article.

In one telling, on March 5, 1923, Lenin broke off personal relations with Stalin. He attempted to enlist Leon Trotsky to take over the Georgian problem, and began preparing three notes and a speech, where he would announce to the Party Congress that Stalin would be removed as General Secretary. However, on March 9, 1923, Lenin suffered a third stroke, which would eventually lead to his death. Trotsky declined to confront Stalin on the issue with some speculating it was due to his long-held prejudice against Georgia as a Menshevik stronghold or out of concern of being politically isolated without Lenin's support. At the 12th Party Congress in April 1923, the Georgian Communists found themselves isolated. With Lenin's notes suppressed, every word uttered from the platform against Georgian or Ukrainian nationalism was greeted with stormy applause, while the mildest allusion to Great Russian chauvinism was received in stony silence.

Thus Lenin's illness, Stalin's increasing influence in the party and his ascent toward full power, and the sidelining of Leon Trotsky led to the marginalization of the decentralist forces within the Georgian Communist Party.

Historian Stephen Kotkin, however, has challenged the authenticity of the source materials involved in reaching this conclusion. Conversely, most historians consider Lenin's major writings during this period the document to be an accurate reflection of his views.

Over December 15–16, 1922, Lenin's condition had worsened, which left him unable to write ever again, and he relied instead on dictation. Two days later, the Central Committee voted to restrict contact between Lenin and other Soviet leaders; six days after that, it voted to restrict the time Lenin would be allowed to spend each day on dictation to 5–10 minutes, adding that "this cannot have the character of correspondence, and [Lenin] may not expect to receive any answers." These restrictions were aimed at helping Lenin to recuperate, but they became instead a source of deep distress.

According to Kotkin, Trotsky claimed to have received a cordial letter from Lenin dated December 21, but the original has never been found.

On January 25, 1923, the Central Committee met to hear the findings of the Dzerzhinsky report, and voted to endorse them. In accordance with the restrictions they had earlier approved, Lenin was not present and was forbidden from receiving this report.

Distressed by this state of affairs, Lenin had requested the previous day that a copy of the report be obtained so that his personal secretariat could study it. Around this time, Stalin, who had been voted in charge of official access to Lenin, had a sharp dispute over the telephone with Lenin's wife, Nadezhda Krupskaya, over his refusal to turn over the materials.

The dispute left Krupskaya livid with Stalin and both sides began to feel concern about intrigue.

Krupskaya would eventually obtain the dossier and a report would be prepared for Lenin. According to pro-Stalin writers, Krupskaya omitted details that made the harsh reaction to the Georgian Central Executive Committee appear more reasonable.

On March 6, a telegram signed by Lenin addressed to Mdivani and Makharadze offered them his strong support against the "conniving" of Stalin and Dzerzhinsky. On the same day, however, Lenin's physicians recorded that "When he awoke, he summoned a nurse, but he could almost not converse with her, he wanted the nurse to summon Nadezhda Konstantinova [Krupskaya, Lenin's wife], but he could not say her name.... [Lenin] is agitated, he tries to speak, but cannot find the words..."

An article supposedly written by Lenin—despite his by then having lost nearly all communicative faculty according to Stalin—appeared in an April issue of Pravda, appearing to support Trotsky's position on Georgia at the expense of Stalin.

According to pro-Stalin historian Valentin Sakharov, who is cited heavily by Kotkin, the authorship of the friendly letter to Trotsky, the conciliatory telegram to Makharov and Mdivani, the counter-dossier, and the Pravda article, may have all been fabricated in part or whole by Krupskaya, possibly as a result of a falling out between her and Stalin.

== Aftermath ==
The affair held back the careers of the Georgian Old Bolsheviks, but Ordzhonikidze's reputation also suffered and he was soon recalled from the Caucasus. Mdivani and his associates were removed to minor posts, but they were not actively attacked until the late 1920s. Most of them were later executed during the Great Purge of the 1930s. Another major consequence of the defeat of Georgian "national deviationists" was the intensification of political repressions in Georgia, leading to an armed rebellion in August 1924 and the ensuing Red Terror, which took several thousands of lives.
