= Ghoresha =

Ghoresha ღორეშა
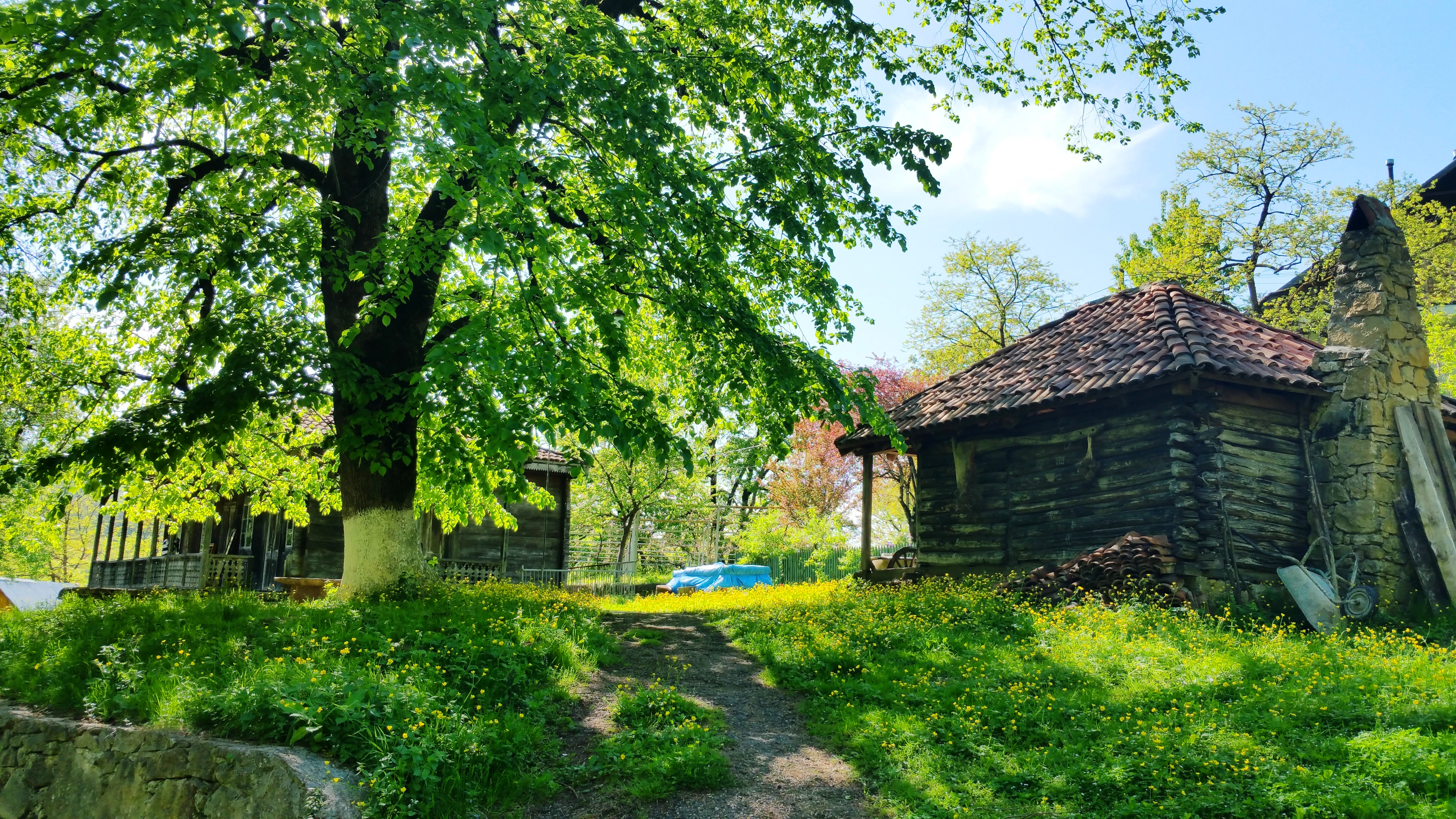
- Museum and house of Sergo Ordzhonikidze in Ghoresha

- Location within Imereti Location within Georgia
- Coordinates: 42°04′40″N 43°16′03″E
- Country: Georgia
- Mkhare: Imereti
- Municipality: Kharagauli
- Elevation: 440 m (1,440 ft)

Population (2014)
  - Total: 767
- Time zone: UTC+4 (Georgian Time)

Ghoresha (Georgian: ღორეშა) is a village in the Kharagauli district of Imereti region in western Georgia. It is known for being the birthplace of Sergo Ordzhonikidze, a leading Bolshevik and close ally of Joseph Stalin.
