= Fourth Conference of the Central Committee of the Russian Communist Party (b) with the Workers of the National Republics of the Regions =

The Fourth Conference of the Central Committee of the Russian Communist Party (b) with the Workers of the National Republics of the Regions was held on Joseph Stalin's initiative in Moscow between June 9–12, 1923.

It was attended by members and candidate members of the Central Committee of the R.C.P.(B.) and 58 representatives of various national republics and regions. Stalin presented his report on Practical Measures for Implementing the Resolution on the National Question Adopted by the Twelfth Party Congress while twenty Party organisations of the national republics and regions gave reports from their own localities. The Control Commission also gave its report on Mirsaid Sultan-Galiev, who was denounced for "anti-party" and "anti-Soviet" activity.
