= Charles Henry Huberich =

American lawyer and scholar of international law

Charles Henry Huberich (February 18, 1877 – June 18, 1945) was an American lawyer and scholar of international law. In 1906, he served as the acting executive head of Stanford Law School.

== Life and education ==
Charles Henry Huberich was born on February 18, 1877, in Toledo, Ohio, to Emma (Richers) Huberich and Conrad Huberich. He received a bachelor of laws from the University of Texas in 1897, a doctorate of civil law from Yale Law School in 1899, a doctorate of both laws (JUD) from Heidelberg University in 1905, (Note: It is not clear whether the university in question is Heidelberg University in Heidelberg, or Heidelberg University in Tiffin, Ohio.) and a doctorate of laws from the University of Melbourne in 1907.

He married Nina Mdivani, of the Georgian Mdivani family of socialites, on October 14, 1925. They divorced in May 1936.

Huberich died on June 18, 1945, in Cambridge, Massachusetts.

== Legal career ==
In 1907, Huberich spent three months researching commercial law in Australia and Polynesia. He taught at Stanford Law School from 1907 to 1912. Between 1919 and 1938, he practiced in London, The Hague, Berlin, and Paris.

== Scholarship ==
In 1915, Huberich wrote two monographs on prize law in two languages: one on English prize law in German; and another on German prize law in English, in collaboration with Richard King.

Huberich's The Law Relating to Trade with the Enemy (1918) is an account of the legal issues involved in administering various trading with the enemy acts in the United Kingdom and United States, with a particular focus on the American Trading with the Enemy Act of 1917.

The Political and Legislative History of Liberia, published posthumously in 1947, is a detailed two-volume survey of the legal development of Liberia from its founding onwards. Although it largely focuses on legal history, the work also describes everyday life. It argues that Liberia was always an independent state and never a colony.
