= Simon Mdivani =

Georgian politician

Simon Mdivani სიმონ მდივანი
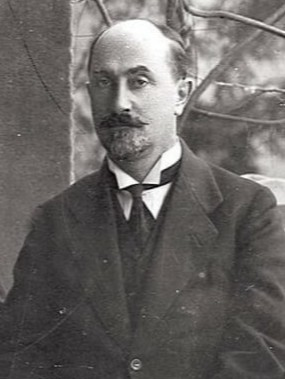
- Simon Mdivani in 1918
- Born: 20 October 1876; Khoni, Russian Empire
- Died: 13 December 1937 (aged 61); Sceaux, France
- Occupations: Politician, diplomat
- Political party: Georgian Socialist-Federalist Revolutionary Party
- Spouse: Princess Nelly (Elene) Nakashidze

Simon Mdivani (Note: The French-language transcription of Georgian surnames was stable until the end of XXth century : the rules constituted by the intermediation of the Russian language, confirmed by the Legation of the Democratic Republic of Georgia in France (1921-1933) and close to the pronunciation in the Georgian language, were used without exception; they are still used today by the French Ministry of Foreign Affairs and by most French academics interested in Georgia. The usage gradually changed with the intermediation of the English language and the definition of a Latin transliteration close to the English transcription (2002). Thus სიმონ მდივანი gives Simon Mdivani in French transcription, and the same spelling in English transcription (and in Latin transliteration).) (Georgian: სიმონ მდივანი; October 20, 1876 – December 13, 1937), was a Georgian politician member of the Georgian Socialist-Federalist Revolutionary Party, exiled in Turkey, then in France following the invasion of his country by the Red Army, and died on December 13, 1937, in Sceaux.

He was a member of the National Council and of the Georgian Constituent Assembly, of which he assumed the vice-presidency, then Ambassador of the Democratic Republic of Georgia to Turkey.

== Biography ==
=== Youth ===
Simon (Svimon) was born in the family of Gurgen Mdivani, heiress of a local Georgian nobility with the rank of aznauri, on October 20, 1876, in Khoni. (Note: The word mdivani means secretary in the Georgian language, and seems to indicate a role in the political administration of the country) He continued his studies in turn at primary school, at the Lyceum of Kutaisi, at the Faculty of Natural Sciences of the University of Odesa, in Ukraine. After obtaining his higher education diploma, he found a job as a chemist in the administration of the city of Odesa and became politically committed against tsarism.

=== 1905 to 1917, Batumi ===
He joined the Georgian Socialist-Federalist Revolutionary Party in Batumi and participated in the popular movement that shook the Russian Empire. He was editor of the daily Chernomorskoe Echo, was prosecuted on December 14, 1906, for an article, was convicted and forced to close the newspaper. He was elected president of the local section, then a member of the central committee of the Georgian Socialist-Federalist Revolutionary Party. At the same time, he chaired a mutual bank.

=== 1918 to 1921, the Democratic Republic of Georgia ===
Signatory of the act of return to the independence of Georgia on May 26, 1918, member of the Georgian National Council, then of the Georgian Constituent Assembly, he was elected vice-president on March 12, 1919, under the social-federalists who obtained 8 deputies in the legislative elections. He sat as Chairman of the Foreign Affairs Committee, Secretary of the Military Committee and the Budget Committee.

On December 27, 1920, he was appointed ambassador to Turkey, in Ankara, with a diplomatic representation made up of General Eristavi, soldiers Emkhvari and Chalikachvili, diplomats Aristo Tchumbadze and Meliton Kartivadze. Simon Mdivani is the first foreign ambassador to recognize the Kemalist regime poised to overthrow the power of Sultan Mehmed VI and the Ottoman Empire.

=== 1921 to 1928, temporary exile in Turkey ===
After the entry of the Red Army into Georgian territory, he emigrated to Constantinople; his brother Polycarpe Mdivani (1877–1937), known as Budu, represented Soviet Georgia in Turkey. In 1926, he participated in the Prometheus movement initiated in Poland by Józef Piłsudski in order to weaken Soviet Russia, and as such was a member of a Council of a Caucasus Confederation in exile (Georgia, Azerbaijan, North Caucasus and Ukraine ). In 1928, he was expelled from Turkey, and joined France.

=== 1928 to 1937, the definitive exile in France ===
He continued to fight for the liberation of Georgia from Soviet occupation. He prepared in particular the days devoted to Shota Rustaveli, at the University of the Sorbonne, but died before them : he died on December 13, 1937, in Sceaux. He rests in the Georgian square of the Leuville-sur-Orge cemetery.
