= Sergo Ordzhonikidze =

Soviet politician (1886–1937)

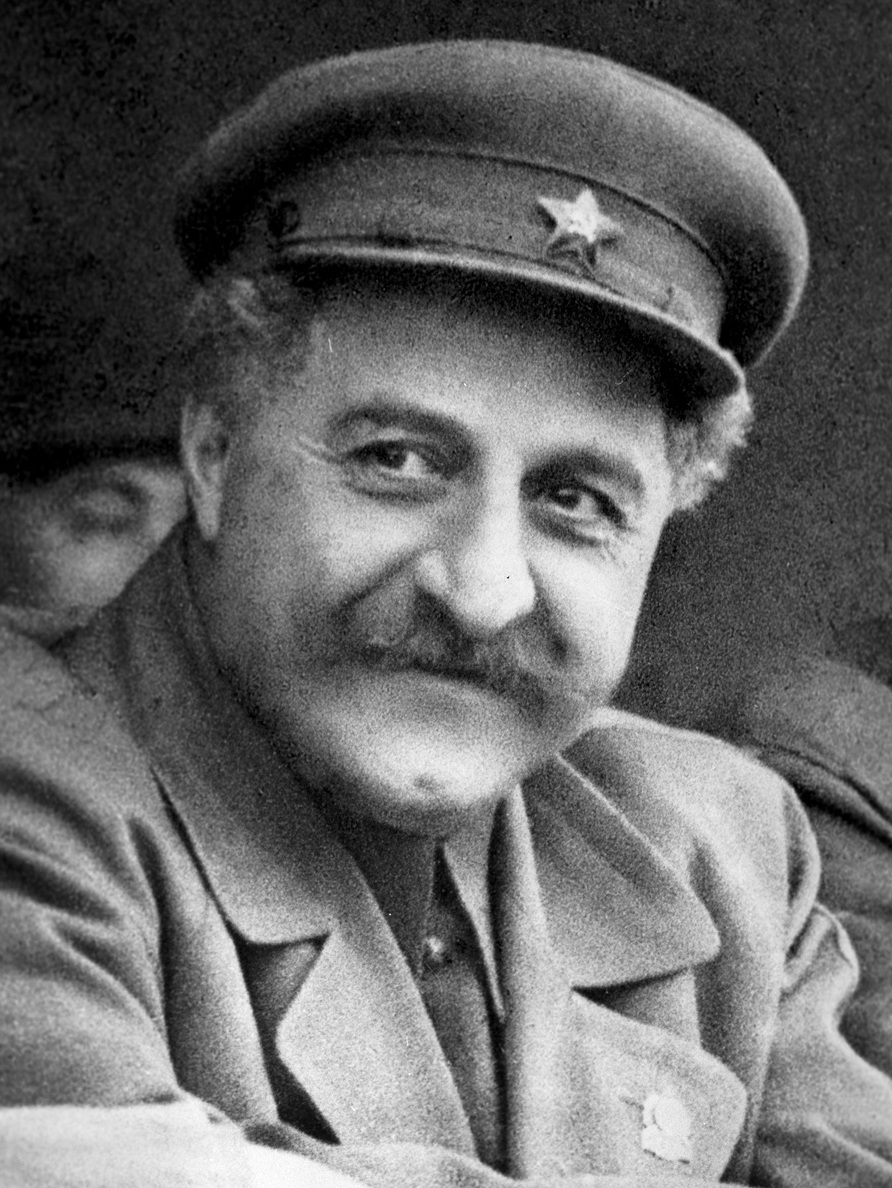
- Ordzhonikidze in 1937

People's Commissar of Heavy Industry
- In office 5 January 1932 – 18 February 1937
- Preceded by: Position established; Himself as Chairman of the Supreme Soviet of the National Economy
- Succeeded by: Valery Mezhlauk

Chairman of the Supreme Soviet of the National Economy
- In office 10 November 1930 – 5 January 1932
- Preceded by: Valerian Kuybyshev
- Succeeded by: Position abolished; Himself as People's Commissar of Heavy Industry

People's Commissar of the Workers' and Peasants' Inspectorate
- In office 5 November 1926 – 10 November 1930
- Preceded by: Valerian Kuybyshev
- Succeeded by: Andrey Andreyev

Full member of the 16th and 17th Politburo
- In office 21 December 1930 – 18 February 1937

Candidate member of the 14th Politburo
- In office 23 July 1926 – 3 November 1926

Personal details
- Born: Grigol Konstantines dze Ordzhonikidze; 24 October [O.S. 12 October] 1886 Ghoresha, Russian Empire
- Died: 18 February 1937 (aged 50) Moscow, Soviet Union
- Resting place: Kremlin Wall Necropolis
- Party: RSDLP (Bolsheviks) (1903–1918); Communist Party of the Soviet Union (1918–1937)

Sergo Konstantinovich Ordzhonikidze (Note: In this name that follows East Slavic naming customs, the patronymic is Konstantinovich and the family name is Ordzhonikidze.) (Note: Russian: Серго Константинович Орджоникидзе; Georgian: სერგო კონსტანტინეს ძე ორჯონიკიძე, romanized: Sergo Konstantines dze Orjonikidze.) (born Grigol Konstantines dze Orjonikidze; (Note: Georgian: გრიგოლ კონსტანტინეს ძე ორჯონიკიძე; Russian: Григорий Константинович Орджоникидзе, romanized: Grigoriy Konstantinovich Ordzhonikidze.) 24 October [O.S. 12 October] 1886 – 18 February 1937) was an Old Bolshevik and a Soviet statesman.

Born and raised in Georgia, in the Russian Empire, Ordzhonikidze joined the Bolsheviks at an early age and quickly rose within the ranks to become an important figure within the group. Arrested and imprisoned several times by the Russian police, he was in Siberian exile when the February Revolution began in 1917. Returning from exile, Ordzhonikidze took part in the October Revolution that brought the Bolsheviks to power. During the subsequent Civil War he played an active role as the leading Bolshevik in the Caucasus, overseeing the invasions of Azerbaijan, Armenia, and Georgia. He backed their union into the Transcaucasian Socialist Federative Soviet Republic (TSFSR), which helped form the Soviet Union, in 1922 and served as the First Secretary of the TSFSR until 1926.

Promoted to lead the Workers' and Peasants' Inspectorate (Rabkrin), Ordzhonikidze moved to Moscow and joined the inner circle of top Bolsheviks. Tasked with overseeing Soviet economic production, Ordzhonikidze led a massive overhaul of Rabkrin and its associated bodies, noting inefficiencies within the Supreme Soviet of the National Economy (Vesenkha). In 1930 he was transferred to lead Vesenkha, which was re-formed as the People's Commissariat of Heavy Industry (NKTP) in 1932. While there, Ordzhonikidze oversaw the implementation of the five-year plans for economic development and helped create the Stakhanovite movement of model Soviet workers. At the same time, he was named to the Politburo, the leading political body in the Soviet Union.

Ordzhonikidze was reluctant to take part in the campaigns against so-called wreckers and saboteurs that began in the early 1930s, causing friction between himself and his longtime friend Joseph Stalin, whom he helped during his rise to power. Realizing the need for people experienced in their fields, Ordzhonikidze refused to purge older workers or disassociate himself from individuals deemed anti-Bolshevik. According to some theories, his relationship with Stalin deteriorated and, on the eve of a 1937 meeting where he was expected to denounce workers, Ordzhonikidze shot himself and died at his home, though this has been contested.

== Early life ==
=== Youth ===
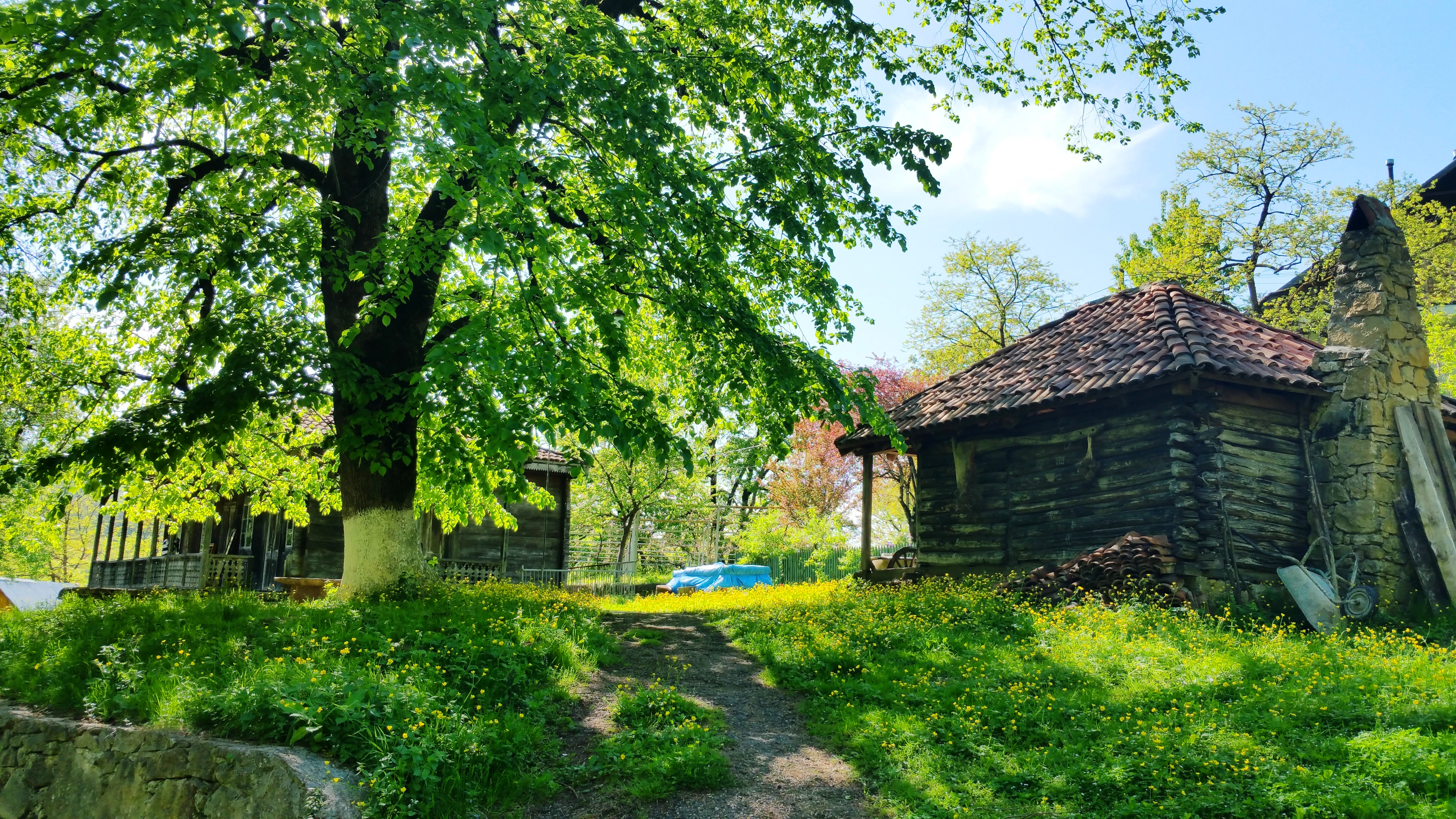
The house where Ordzhonikidze was born in Ghoresha, Georgia.

Grigol Ordzhonikidze (Note: He adopted the name Sergo as a revolutionary.) was born in 1886 in Ghoresha, a village in the Kutais Governorate of the Russian Empire (now in the Imereti region of Georgia). Named after his maternal grandfather, he was the second child of Konstantine Ordzhonikidze and Eupraxia Tavarashvili; he had an older brother, Papulia. Ordzhonikidze's father Konstantine was a member of an impoverished Georgian noble family, while Eupraxia was a peasant.

Six weeks after Grigol's birth, his mother died. Konstantine worked the family farm growing grains but this was not enough to live on. Konstantine began working in Chiatura, a mining community, and drove manganese to Zestaponi, where it was refined.

Unable to take care of his son, Konstantine sent Grigol to live with his uncle and aunt, David and Eka Ordzhonikidze, who also lived in Ghoresha. Konstantine would later marry Despine Gamtsemlidze and have three more children. (Note: Ivan (1889), Yulia (1890), and Konstantine (1896).) Grigol grew up in the household of David and Eka, but as they lived close to his father, Grigol would frequently visit him. The elder Konstantine died when Ordzhonikidze was 10 years old, leaving him with David and Eka. He completed school, had medical training to become an orderly, and worked briefly as a medical assistant.

=== Bolsheviks ===
Ordzhonikidze joined the Russian Social Democratic Labour Party (RSDLP) in 1903 when he was 17 and worked for them in an underground printshop distributing leaflets for the Bolshevik faction of the party. By 1905 a revolution began in Russia, and he was given more dangerous assignments. He was arrested for the first time in December 1905 for transporting arms and spent several months in prison. Granted bail, he fled briefly to Germany to avoid trial, though he soon returned to work in Baku, where he had previously been working. There he helped organize the 1907 May Day parade and was arrested again. He may also have been involved in the assassination of the prominent Georgian writer Ilia Chavchavadze on 12 September 1907.

Imprisoned for a third time in October 1907, Ordzhonikidze shared a cell with a fellow Georgian revolutionary, Iosif Dzhugashvili, who would later adopt the name Joseph Stalin. The two became close friends and spent their time playing backgammon and discussing politics. After his fourth arrest, in November 1907, Ordzhonikidze was exiled to Siberia, though he fled after several months and came back to work in Baku. The Bolsheviks reassigned him to Persia to help with the revolutionary movement that was launched there in 1910. The Bolsheviks were unable to gain sufficient support in Persia and Ordzhonikidze returned to Baku.

In 1911, Ordzhonikidze traveled to Paris where he met Vladimir Lenin, the leader of the Bolsheviks. He attended classes at the Longjumeau Party School, which had been set up to train Bolsheviks, though he left after a short time because of party in-fighting. He was sent back to Russia to help prepare the Sixth RSDLP Conference, which was held in Prague, Austria-Hungary in January 1912. At this meeting the Bolsheviks, the majority faction within the RSDLP, confirmed themselves to be a distinct party and established themselves as a separate party; while they had split from the RSDLP back in 1903 and ceased to work with it, they formally remained part of it until the Prague Conference. Ordzhonikidze was elected to the Central Committee of the Bolshevik Party, the leadership body of the party, and sent back to Russia to inform other Bolsheviks of the results of the Conference. He also visited Stalin, exiled in Vologda, and the two traveled back to the Caucasus, then to Saint Petersburg, where Ordzhonikidze was arrested once again in April 1912.

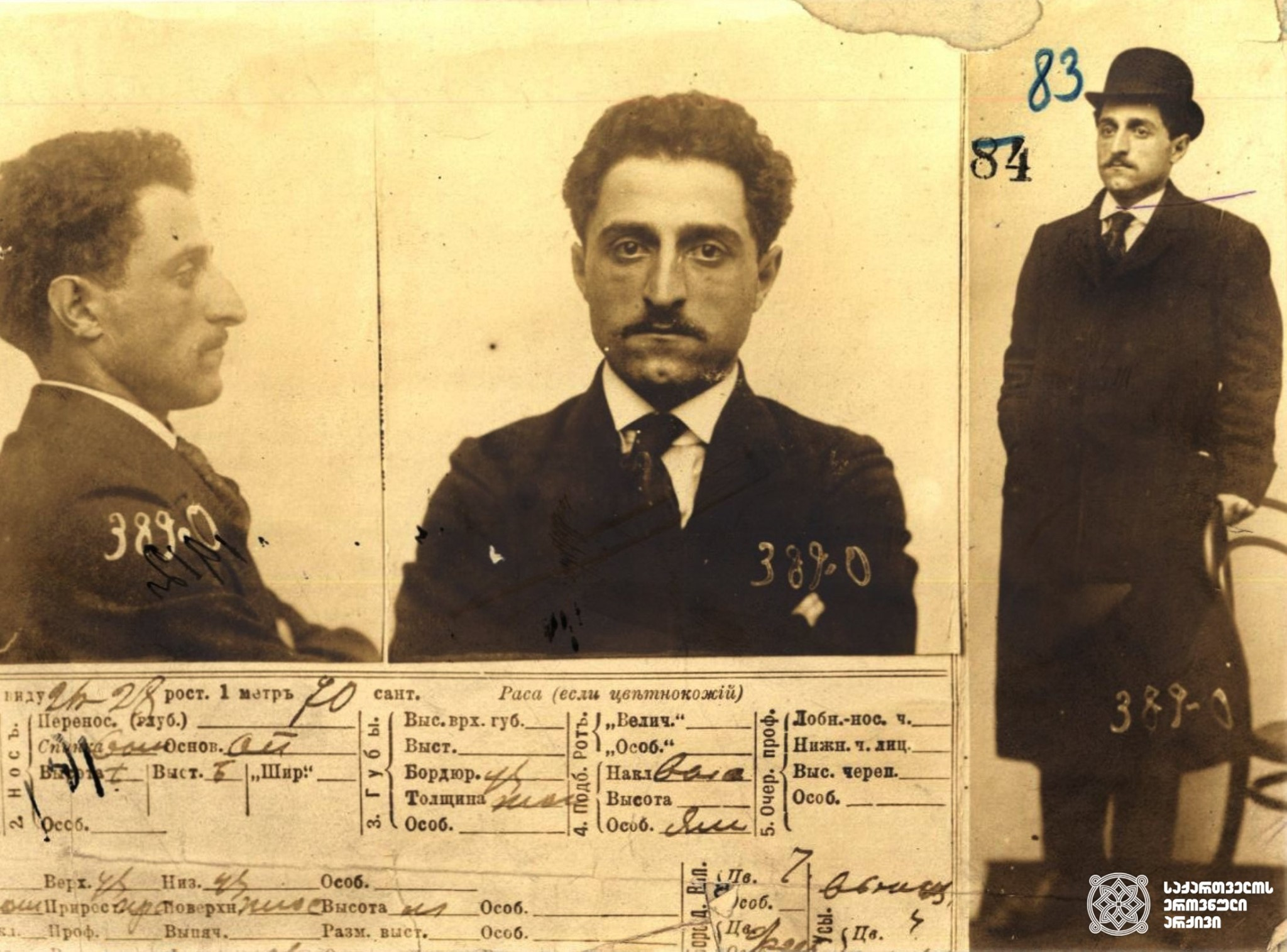
Ordzhonikidze's Okhrana mugshot, 1912

Recognized by the authorities as a revolutionary, Ordzhonikidze was sentenced to three years at the Shlisselburg Fortress prison. Late in 1915 he was sentenced to permanent exile in the eastern Siberian town of Yakutsk, where he met his future wife Zinaida in September 1916. They were married in 1917 and would adopt a daughter, Eteri (born 1923).

In exile, Ordzhonikidze mainly spent his time reading; his favourites were Georgian classics as well as authors like Jack London, Lord Byron, and Fyodor Dostoevsky. He also was interested in statistics relating to the Russian economy, especially details regarding the production of food and agriculture, as well as the works of Karl Marx and Friedrich Engels.

Ordzhonikidze was still in Yakutsk when news of the 1917 February Revolution reached him. He briefly worked with the Yakutsk soviet (council) before quickly leaving for Petrograd (as Saint Petersburg had been named since 1914), reaching there by the end of May. Once in the city, Ordzhonikidze took on an active role in the revolution. He became a member of the Petrograd Bolshevik Committee and would frequently address rallies and visit large factories to conduct party work. In doing this Ordzhonikidze became closely associated with both Lenin and Stalin. He returned briefly to Georgia for a visit but was back in Petrograd by October and was there for the October Revolution when the Bolsheviks seized power.

== Russian Civil War ==
=== North Caucasus ===
The outbreak of the Russian Civil War in 1917 saw Ordzhonikidze appointed as the Bolsheviks' Commissar of Ukraine, South Russia, and the North Caucasus. In this role he saw action at the Battle of Tsaritsyn and the Western Front in Ukraine, but it was in the Caucasus that he was most active. Sent to Vladikavkaz in the North Caucasus in July 1918, Ordzhonikidze and other Bolsheviks had to flee to the mountains in August as the city was occupied by Cossacks.

While in hiding Ordzhonikidze led attempts to convince Cossack soldiers to abandon their officers and join the Bolsheviks, but was not successful. Ordzhonikidze also organized meetings with the local Chechen and Ingush population and urged them to join, arguing that the soviet system was similar to the Islamic system the Chechens favored. This proved successful, and with Ingush help the Bolsheviks re-conquered Vladikavkaz in mid-August.

By late 1918 Ordzhonikidze effectively controlled every Bolshevik body within the North Caucasus and surrounding region: "the Crimea, Don, Kuban, Terek, Dagestan Oblasts, Stavropol, and Black Sea Gubernias, and the Black Sea Fleet", as historian Stephen Blank has noted, were subordinate to him. Ordzhonikidze earned a reputation as a brutal leader and ordered the arrest or execution of many opponents associated with the Mensheviks, Socialist Revolutionaries, or any other group fighting the Bolsheviks.

To help co-ordinate control over the region, the Central Committee in Petrograd authorized the formation of the Caucasian Bureau (Kavbiuro) on 8 April 1920. It was tasked with establishing Bolshevik rule over the Caucasus (both the North, which was under Bolshevik control, and the South Caucasus), and assisting other revolutionary movements in the region. Ordzhonikidze was named the chairman of the Kavbiuro, while Sergei Kirov was made vice-chairman. Ordzhonikidze was also given a position on the Revolutionary Military Council of the Caucasian Front and named Chairman of the North Caucasus Revolutionary Committee.

=== South Caucasus ===
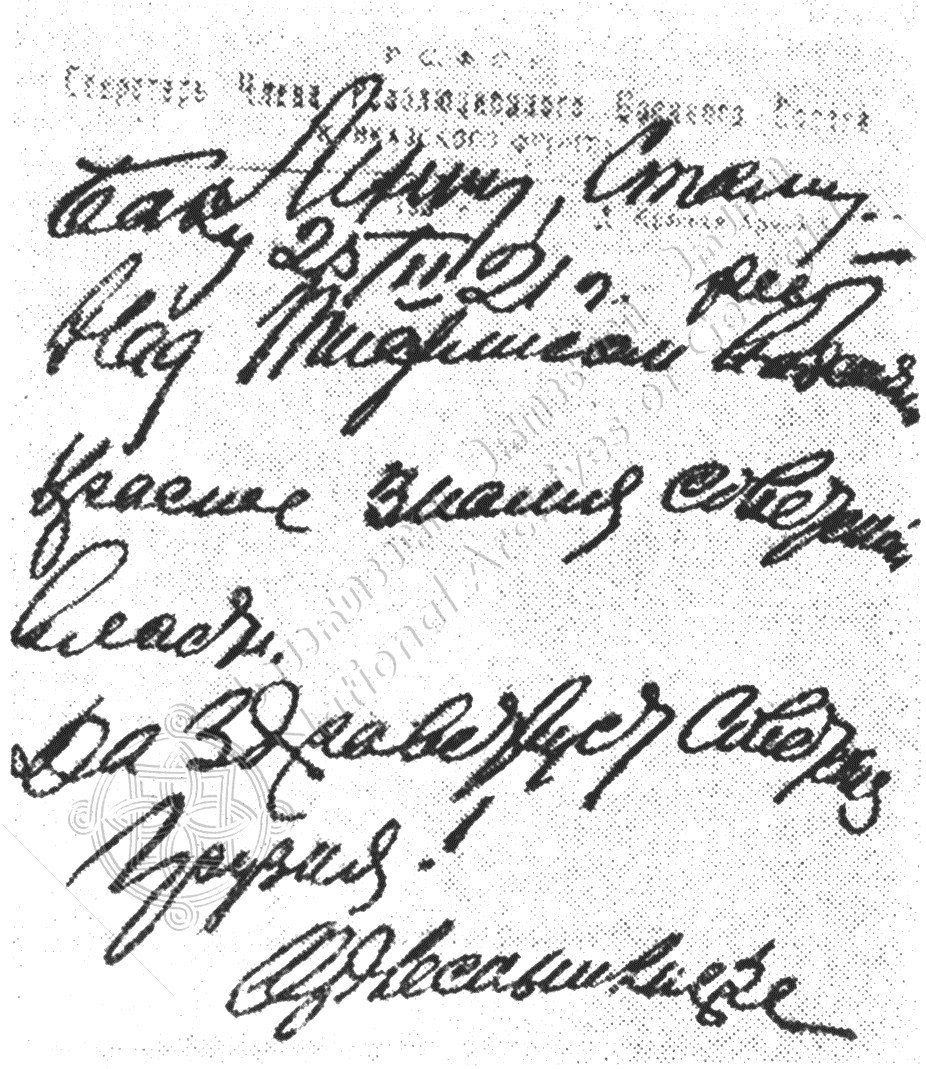
Orjonikidze's telegram to Lenin and Stalin: "The Red Flag of Soviet power flies over Tiflis..." This marked the consolidation of Bolshevik control in the South Caucasus.

In the aftermath of the Russian Revolution of 1917, the South Caucasus had broken away from Russia and by mid-1918 comprised three independent states: Armenia, Azerbaijan, and Georgia. Bolshevik activity in the region was limited; only the city of Baku was under control of a small group of local allies at that point. With vast deposits of oil in the region around Baku, it was of vital importance to the Bolsheviks that they control the area. After Ordzhonikidze consolidated control in the North Caucasus, Lenin issued an order to him on 17 March 1920 to prepare for an invasion of Azerbaijan.

Using the pretext of a local Bolshevik uprising in Azerbaijan, Ordzhonikidze ordered the Eleventh Army to invade on 27 April 1920; with most of the Azerbaijani army fighting Armenia in Nagorno-Karabakh, Baku was occupied by the Bolsheviks by 23:00 that night. The ease with which Azerbaijan was occupied emboldened Ordzhonikidze, and he began making preparations to launch similar invasions of Armenia and Georgia and supported a failed coup attempt in Georgia on 2–3 May. It was not until 27 November that he was given approval from both Lenin and Stalin to prepare the Eleventh Army to invade Armenia, which he did the next day. Already weakened from earlier regional conflicts, Armenia was unable to put up any resistance and surrendered on 2 December.

There was serious discussion among the Bolshevik leadership on how to best approach Georgia, the remaining state outside of their control. While Ordzhonikidze wanted to repeat his earlier actions and invade, he was opposed by the rest of the Central Committee, Lenin in particular favouring a more peaceful approach.

By early February 1921 Lenin had relented somewhat and consented to Ordzhonikidze leading the Eleventh Army into Georgia to support a local Bolshevik uprising. Concerned about gaining the support of the Georgian populace, Lenin sent Ordzhonikidze a telegram outlining a policy to be implemented, which included seeking a compromise with the Menshevik leadership.

The invasion of Georgia began on 15 February. The Georgians put up a strong fight but were unable to stop the Bolsheviks, and on 25 February the Bolshevik forces occupied the capital Tiflis (now Tbilisi). Ordzhonikidze sent a telegram to Lenin and Stalin with the news, stating, "The proletarian flag flies over Tiflis!" In recognition of his work in the Caucasus, Ordzhonikidze was awarded the Order of the Red Banner, and the Order of Red Banner of the Azerbaijani SSR in 1921.

=== Georgian affair ===
After the occupation of the South Caucasus, Ordzhonikidze took an active role in establishing Bolshevik authority over the region, Georgia in particular requiring considerable work due to the strong opposition to the Bolsheviks there. As the head of the Kavbiuro, Ordzhonikdze was the nominal leader of the Bolsheviks in Georgia but had to work with the local leadership, which was split between Filipp Makharadze and Budu Mdivani. Owing to his years of service as an organizer and theorist Makharadze was well-respected among the Georgian Bolsheviks, while Mdivani was a strong proponent of Georgian national sentiment, which was not as popular with local Bolsheviks. This led to a clash between Ordzhonikidze and the Georgian Bolsheviks, especially as Ordzhonikidze would ignore the advice of the Georgians who were familiar with the situation within the country.

Ordzhonikidze and Stalin, both natives of Georgia, were concerned about the nationalism displayed by the remaining Georgian Mensheviks (most had left in 1921), who were initially allowed to work with the Bolsheviks. They considered Georgian nationalism as serious a threat as Great Russian chauvinism, in that both variants dominated ethnic minorities within their regions (Georgia over the Abkhazians and Ossetians, Russia over several ethnic groups). They wanted to bring Georgia into a union with the Russian Soviet Republic as soon as possible to eliminate any nationalist tendencies, but Lenin was also concerned about moving too quickly: independent Georgia had started to gain support among European states, and with the weak international position of the Bolsheviks, the possibility of an uprising or civil war was a serious threat.

Not wanting to allow this dispute to become public, the Central Committee largely stood behind Ordzhonikidze and allowed him to implement policies as he saw fit. This involved uniting the three states of the South Caucasus into one federation, which he argued was the best option both militarily and economically, especially as it would make union with Russia simpler. In April 1921 the railways, post and telegraph, and foreign trade of Armenia, Azerbaijan, and Georgia were merged; further economic ties, notably the removal of customs barriers, were made throughout May and June, which caused resentment among the Georgian Bolsheviks.

Tensions remained high until November, when the Kavbiuro announced that the three states would be united into the Transcaucasian Socialist Federative Soviet Republic (TSFSR). This caused an uproar among the Georgians, who protested that such a move was premature; their arguments delayed the formation of the federation until March 1922. This dispute, which later became known as the Georgian affair, delayed the creation of the Soviet Union, which was not proclaimed until December 1922.

The conflict peaked in November 1922, when Ordzhonikidze resorted to physical violence with a member of the Mdivani group and struck him during a verbal confrontation. This resulted in complaints to Lenin. In late December 1922, Lenin accepted that both Ordzhonikidze and Stalin were guilty of the imposition of Great Russian nationalism upon non-Russian nationalities, which was reflected in his last major writings known as Lenin's Testament. In early March 1923, he also wrote a letter to Mdivani and Makharadze in support of their case. However, Lenin’s health subsequently deteriorated and he was unable to deal with the case any further. In January 25, 1923, the Politburo decided to remove Mdivani and his associates from their posts, which represented a conclusive victory for Ordzhonikidze and his backers.

Ordzhonikidze retained his leadership role in the Caucasus, assuming the title of First Secretary, and remained there until 1926.

== Rabkrin economic agency and Party Control Commission ==
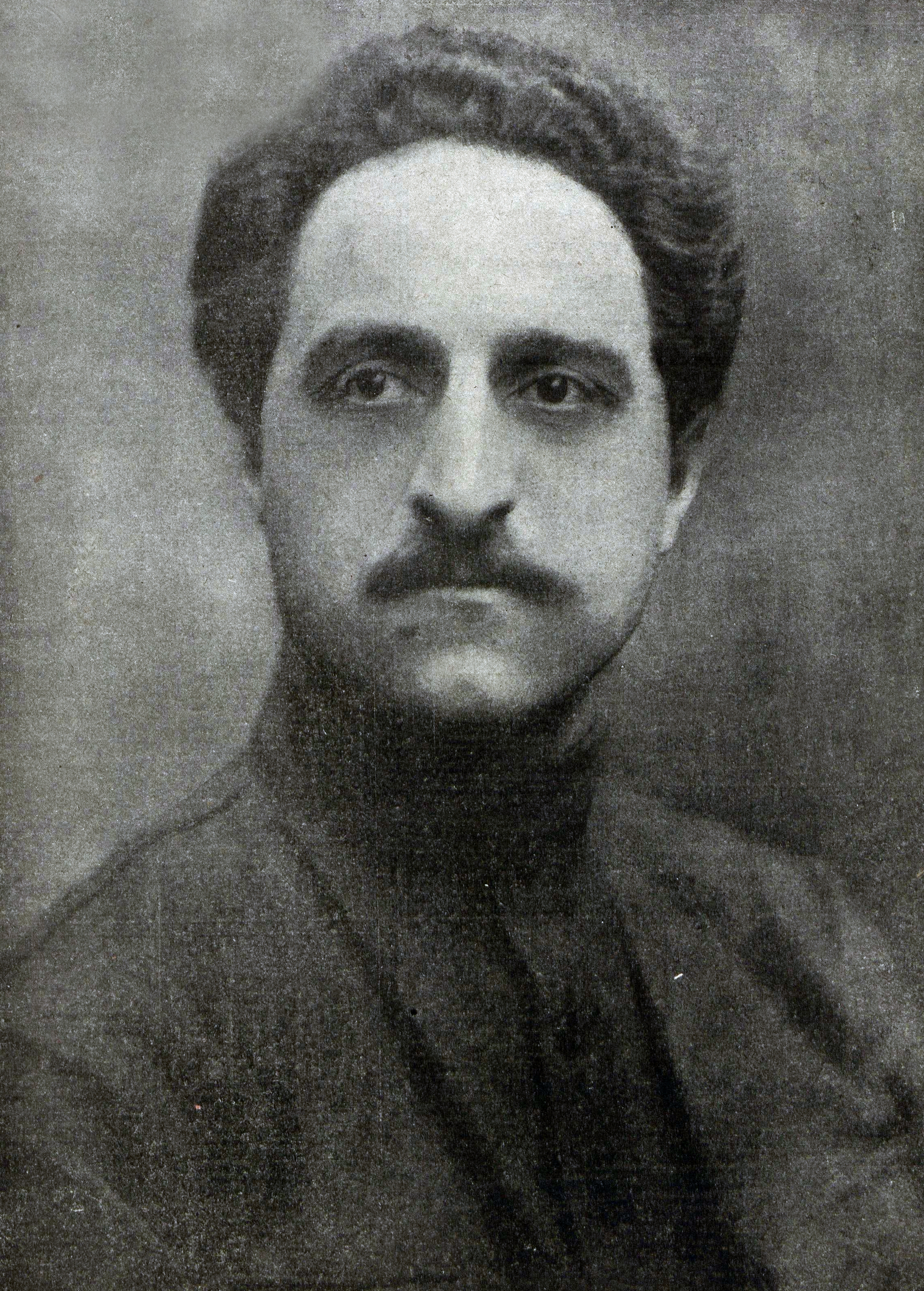
Ordzhonikidze in 1926

In 1926 Ordzhonikidze was named the head of the Central Control Commission of the Communist Party, the body responsible for party discipline, and of the Workers' and Peasants' Inspectorate (known by its Russian acronym Rabkrin), an agency created to oversee implementation of Soviet economic policy at every level. Though initially reluctant to take up the positions, as it meant a move to Moscow, Ordzhonikidze was forced to do so by Stalin, who told him to either accept the post or become First Secretary of the North Caucasus, which would have been a downgrade in status and prestige. Historian Oleg Khlevniuk speculated that Ordzhonikidze was not interested in taking over Rabkrin as it meant leaving the quiet of a low-key post in the Caucasus and getting intimately involved in the drama and politics at the highest levels.

As the head of Rabkrin, Ordzhonikidze replaced Valerian Kuybyshev, who took over the Supreme Soviet of the National Economy (known as Vesenka, after its Russian acronym, VSNKh). At the same time as this appointment, Ordzhonikidze was named a candidate member of the Politburo, the executive committee of the Communist Party, though technically his position as head of the Central Control Commission should have precluded that, as there was supposed to be a separation between the two offices. He served as a candidate member of the Politburo from 23 July to 3 November 1926, when he was removed.

The purpose of Rabkrin was meant to ensure the Soviet economy worked properly, in that it oversaw planning and implementation, budgetary considerations, and administrative policies. Under Kuybyshev, Rabkrin had become rather ineffective and was primarily focused on administrative theory rather than firm action, in part because the economic situation of the Soviet Union had improved by 1926. Initially unfamiliar with the field, Ordzhonikidze quickly educated himself on the best means to use Rabkrin and re-oriented its focus towards industry, specifically overseeing the workings of Vesenka. In a speech he gave to Rabkrin officials shortly after taking over, Ordzhonikidze stated they had two main duties: to fight bureaucratization of the state and economic apparatus and to "review the whole complex of the state system".

Between 1927 and 1930, Rabkrin launched hundreds of investigations into the workings of the Soviet economy. Historian Sheila Fitzpatrick has noted that during this period it looked at "the oil industry, the chemical industry (twice), precious metals, capital construction in industry, repair and re-equipment of industry, planning in industry, delivery of imported equipment, use of foreign experts, the design bureau of the metallurgical industry, diesels, coal, steel, textiles and most of Vesenkha's major industrial trusts, in addition to drafting a radical reform of the structure of industrial administration". Reports would be presented to the highest authorities, and frequently included the Politburo and Central Committee. At the other end Ordzhonikidze was sought out by factory managers, who would present grievances and petitions in hopes of getting help from Rabkrin.

Ordzhonikidze revitalized Rabkrin; it became a powerful tool within the Soviet Union, and by the end of the 1920s was the centre of state industrial policymaking, usurping that role from Vesenka. This role became more prominent during the first five-year plan, an economic development plan that began in 1929. While Vesenka was tasked with implementing the high targets of the plan, Rabkrin oversaw everything and ensured that industrial production was increased while keeping costs down.

This caused friction between the two bodies, Vesenka complaining that they could not work with such interference, made worse by Rabkrin investigations of alleged wreckers and counter-revolutionaries. (Note: Wreckers and counter-revolutionaries were terms used to describe individuals accused of stopping economic progress or outright damaging the state. See Fitzpatrick 1985, pp. 156–157.) These disputes reached a peak at the 16th Party Congress in June 1930, where Ordzhonikidze gave a speech outlining Kuybyshev and Vesenka's failures in industry.

== Vesenka (Supreme Soviet of the National Economy) ==
Likely in response to his critique of Kuybyshev, Ordzhonikidze was made the new head of Vesenka on 13 November 1930, and Kuybyshev was moved to the State Planning Committee (Gosplan). Shortly after his new appointment, on 21 December 1930, Ordzhonikidze was also named as a full member of the Politburo, as he had also been removed from his post at the Central Control Commission.

On his arrival at Vesenka Ordzhonikidze was mandated to improve the quality of workers. Khlevniuk has also argued that by putting a close ally in charge of Vesenka, Stalin was aiming to strengthen his own position in a field previously neglected. Replacing Ordzhonikidze at Rabkrin was Andrey Andreyev; with Stalin firmly in control of the Soviet Union, Rabkrin had lost its importance, and it was eventually made subordinate to the Central Committee.

Much like when he started at Rabkrin, Ordzhonikidze was not an expert on the work of Vesenka, but immediately began to familiarize himself with it. Though he was not educated, Ordzhonikidze compensated by being energetic and assertive in his tasks and worked to deliver results. Devoted to his workers, he brought many of the senior staff from Rabkrin with him: by 1931 nine of eighteen sector heads in Vesenka were either from Rabkrin or the Control Commission.

Tasked with finding wreckers within Vesenka, Ordzhonikidze initially followed Stalin's view and took a harsh stance on the matter, eagerly trying to clean up the organization. Within a few months, his position had softened, and he came to defend the branch; Fitzpatrick suggested this change was due to the realization that there was a shortage of trained workers and low morale stemming from the purges.

It was around this time that Ordzhonikidze's relationship with Stalin began to change; while quite close previously, Ordzhonikidze's favourable opinion of his workers was not in line with what Stalin wanted to see. Despite calls by Stalin to remove senior workers, Ordzhonikidze relied on them as they had the technical experience required. He would downplay their previous political affiliations and back them up. While new engineers were being trained within the Soviet Union at this time, Ordzhonikidze felt they were not yet ready to take on senior positions yet, thus the need to keep the older workers.

== Heavy Industry ==
In 1932 Vesenka was re-organized as the People's Commissariat of Heavy Industry (known by the Russian acronym NKTP); Ordzhonikidze remained as the head of the new commissariat. As head of the NKTP, Ordzhonikidze played an important role in directing the Soviet economy and oversaw the main aspects of defence production; thus, the needs of the NKTP were considered before nearly every other commissariat.

This was made more apparent with the launch of the second five-year plan in 1933, which Ordzhonikidze took a leading role in drafting. He argued against Stalin regarding growth targets: Stalin wanted to set unrealistic targets, while Ordzhonikidze eventually got Stalin to agree on a yearly industrial growth of 13–14%, which, while high, was attainable. In this Ordzhonikidze was heavily dependent on the technical skills and knowledge of his deputy, Georgy Pyatakov, who led the program.

While visiting Lavrentiy Beria, the First Secretary of the TSFSR, in Tbilisi on 7 November 1934, Ordzhonikidze began to have severe stomach pains and internal bleeding. Four days later, on 11 November, he had a major heart attack, aggravated by food poisoning. On doctor's orders, Ordzhonikidze remained in Georgia until 26 November and then was limited in what he could do.

As a result of this, Ordzhonikidze was unable to travel to Leningrad for the funeral of Sergei Kirov, who had been assassinated on 1 December. This had a profound effect on Ordzhonikidze, who had been a close friend of Kirov. In recognition of this relationship Ordzhonikidze was chosen to place Kirov's urn into the Kremlin Wall, in which other leading Bolsheviks were interred.

=== Stakhanovite movement ===
Ordzhonikidze's concerns about the low productivity within the NKTP and the Soviet economy as a whole led to the launch of the Stakhanovite movement in 1935. Concerned about productivity in two key sectors, metallurgy and coal mining, which had both seen consistent shortages, despite efforts to increase output, Ordzhonikidze took an active role in improving performance.

While metallurgical production was starting to improve, coal mining was not. Ordzhonikidze looked for ways to solve the issue, paying particular attention to the Donbas, a region of Ukraine that was the main centre of Soviet coal production.

Based on Ordzhonikidze's goal of improving coal output, in late August 1935 the Central Irmino mine, which had been producing below its quota, decided to have one miner overachieve his quota as a means to encourage all workers. To ensure things went smoothly, the selected miner would secretly be given assistance, though for appearances he would seem to work alone. Alexei Stakhanov was chosen for the task, and on the night of 30–31 August he mined a reported 102 tons of coal, 14 times his quota (though with the assistance of two helpers it worked out to just over five times his regular output).

Stakhanov's achievement, a Union record for a single night of mining, was reported as a small news item in the 2 September edition of Pravda, the official paper of the Party. It was there that Ordzhonikidze first learned of it and decided to make Stakhanov a symbol of a new program. On 6 September Stakhanov's record was made a front-page story in Pravda, alongside fellow miners who had also set new records in the meantime. Ordzhonikidze praised the work of Stakhanov and encouraged other workers, not just miners, to follow his example and exceed their expected quotas.

Though the Stakhanovite movement led to increased production and enthusiasm both at the official and worker level, results fell short of expectations. To prove themselves, workers and managers falsified quotas, and the increased speed led to a significant increase in workplace accidents. Indeed, coal production in the Donbas actually declined in 1936, leading to an official acknowledgement in a 7 June 1936 Pravda article that the Stakhanovite movement had not worked out. Despite this setback, Ordzhonikidze was recognized for his efforts at the NKTP with the Order of Lenin and Order of the Red Banner of Labour.

== Purges and downfall ==
From the beginning of Ordzhonikidze's time as the head of Vesenka and then the NKTP, there had been efforts to remove so-called wreckers and saboteurs from positions of influence. Ordzhonikidze had long tried to protect those working under him, a characteristic he retained throughout his time in Rabkrin, Vesenka, and the NKTP. This policy was tested throughout the 1930s, as those close to Ordzhonikidze were purged from their positions, forced out as they were perceived to challenge Stalin's authority.

This led to friction between Ordzhonikidze and Stalin. Ordzhonikidze argued against police interference in factory affairs and was successful enough in this to have the Politburo agree to ban prosecutors from investigating factories or even entering them, a policy that Stalin would later regret approving.

=== Lominadze and Pyatakov ===
Early in Ordzhonikidze's tenure at the NKTP, he witnessed the purging of Vissarion Lominadze. Lominadze, a fellow Georgian and an ally of Ordzhonikidze, had been expelled from the Party previously for his role in the Syrtsov-Lominadze Affair, where along with Sergey Syrtsov, he had been accused of "factionalism" in 1930, when the two had opposed collectivization of agriculture.

After returning to Georgia, Lominadze was brought back into a leadership role by Ordzhonikidze, who helped him become the Party Secretary in Magnitogorsk. A wave of arrests of wreckers in January 1935 made Lominadze realize he would soon be targeted; to avoid this, he shot himself on 18 January, and died the next day.

Though Stalin did not bring up the incident initially, in December 1936 he attacked Ordzhonikidze for having secretly corresponded with Lominadze before his suicide and then failing to disclose this to the Politburo. Stalin was also angry that Ordzhonikidze had been sending a pension to Lominadze's wife and son (who was named Sergo in his honour).

Georgy Pyatakov, Ordzhonikidze's deputy at the NKTP, also found himself in trouble. Back in 1921, Ordzhonikidze and Pyatakov had been political enemies, but they soon resolved their differences and established a strong working relationship. Pyatakov followed Ordzhonikidze to Vesenka in 1930 and remained his top deputy when it became the NKTP. As Khlevniuk notes, Ordzhonikidze valued Pyatakov for his "intelligence and organizational abilities" and "well understood ... that his own success as commissar of heavy industry owed much to his first deputy commissar".

Earlier in his career, Pyatakov had worked with Leon Trotsky, Stalin's main rival for leadership of the Bolsheviks throughout the 1920s. Though Pyatakov had been rehabilitated, by 1936 the NKVD, the Soviet secret police, was collecting materials on him.

Pyatakov was arrested on 12 September 1936 and charged with being part of a conspiracy to overthrow the Soviet government. Pyatakov gave forced confessions to the charges. While Ordzhonikidze never gave a statement on the matter, Khlevniuk noted that their long association together likely gave Ordzhonikidze "substantial grounds" to doubt their veracity. Pyatakov was executed in January 1937.

=== Papulia ===
Ordzhonikidze's older brother, Papulia (Russified as Pavel), had also been an active revolutionary and Bolshevik. Ordzhonikidze was instrumental in finding Papulia a position with the Transcaucasus Railway. Papulia was frequently criticized for his work, and in 1932 this criticism was made public, forcing him to take up another position. In November 1936, Papulia was arrested on unspecified charges. Sergo Ordzhonikidze learned of the arrest during a party for his 50th birthday and was so upset at the news that he refused to attend the celebration.

Ordzhonikidze reached out to Beria and asked for his help in freeing Papulia. Beria had been a former protege of Ordzhonikidze, and the two had worked together for years: Ordzhonikidze shielded Beria from attacks from other Bolsheviks, and in return Beria kept him updated on events throughout the Caucasus. Beria had named his son "Sergo" in honour of Ordzhonikidze. Their relationship had changed in the 1930s as Beria rose to become the First Secretary of the Transcaucasus; he grew to resent being treated as a subordinate to Ordzhonikidze and wanted to be respected as an equal.

Beria offered to look into Papulia's arrest, though as he was the dominant figure in the region it is unlikely the arrest was made without his consent; whether Beria ordered the arrest or did so at the behest of Stalin is unknown. Khlevniuk suspected that Beria would not have turned on Ordzhonikidze without Stalin's instruction. The stress of his brother's arrest had a serious effect on Ordzhonikidze's already frail health, leading to heart failure. He reached out to Stalin for help but was refused. Stalin's refusal to help further damaged the relationship between the two.

== Death ==
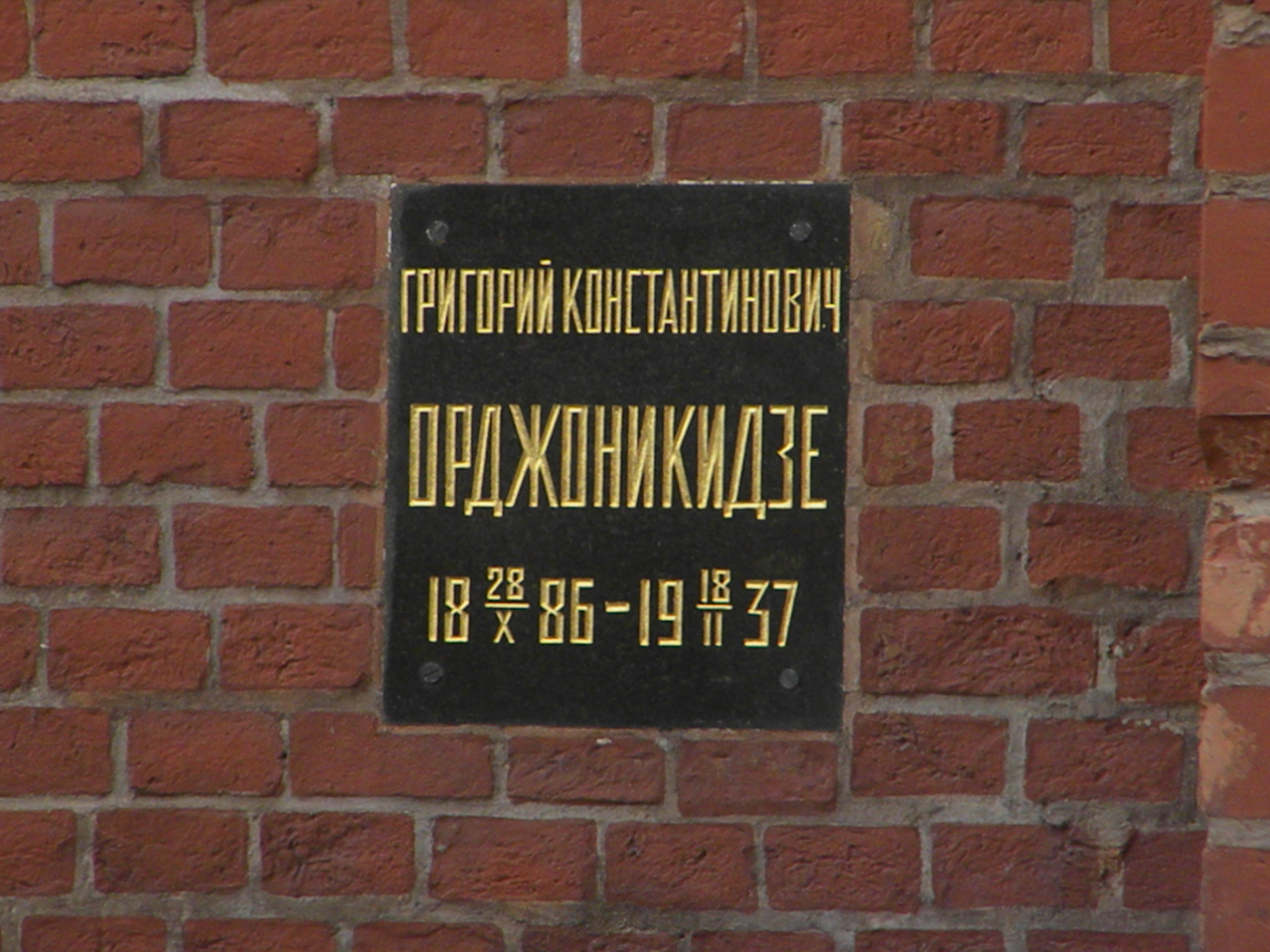
Plaque indicating Ordzhonikidze's interment in the Kremlin Wall

External videos
- In Memory of Sergo Ordzhonikidze a film directed by Dziga Vertov

Throughout the end of 1936 and into 1937, there were further efforts to remove so-called wreckers and saboteurs. Ordzhonikidze was now unable to protect those from the NKTP, which was heavily targeted at this time. He was expected to address wrecking and sabotage within the NKTP at a Central Committee plenum that was scheduled to start 20 February 1937.

On 17 February Ordzhonikidze spoke to Stalin privately on the phone. Ordzhonikidze then left for the Kremlin to see Vyacheslav Molotov and attend a subsequent Politburo meeting. At the meeting he again repeated his belief that charges of wrecking within his Commissariat were exaggerated and was ordered by Stalin to leave after making these remarks; despite Ordzhonokidze being forced to leave, Khlevniuk has noted that the meeting was not unusual in its discussion. After Ordzhonikidze left, he visited Lazar Kaganovich and Alexander Poskrebyshev, and was home that night by 19:00, though he left for his Commissariat office at 21:30. He met a deputy there and was home again by 00:20, following a routine schedule.

The details of the last few hours of Ordzhonikidze's life are unclear. What is known is that upon arriving back home he discovered the NKVD had searched his house, so he phoned Stalin to complain about this intrusion. The two talked angrily, switching between Russian and Georgian, Stalin explaining that the NKVD had the power to search anyone's residence, even his own. Ordzhonikidze was then invited to visit Stalin and did so for about 90 minutes.

The following day, 18 February, Ordzhonikidze stayed at home in bed for most of the day. In the evening Zinaida heard a gunshot from Ordzhonikidze's room, and found him dead, apparently from a self-inflicted gunshot.

Stalin and other leaders arrived quickly at Ordzhonikidze's apartment, where it was decided to announce the cause of death as heart failure. An official bulletin was released the following day; it detailed Ordzhonikidze's troubled health history, and concluded by stating that "[o]n the morning of 18 February Ordzhonikidze made no complaint about his health, but at 17:30, while he was having his afternoon rest, he suddenly fell ill and a few minutes later died of paralysis of the heart".

The announcement of Ordzhonikidze's death came as a surprise to the public. Seen as the driving force behind the industrialization of the Soviet Union, he was held in high esteem. His body lay in state in the House of the Unions on 19 February, and over 250,000 people visited the memorial. The funeral was held on 20 February, and his body was subsequently cremated and the ashes interred within the Kremlin Wall.

=== Cause of death ===
Immediately after Ordzhonikidze's death was announced, the cause of death was disputed. Exiled Mensheviks publicized the idea that Stalin was the reason behind the death, either directly ordering Ordzhonikidze's death, or forcing him to kill himself. The recent arrests of figures within the NKTP also gave credence to these rumours, suggesting Ordzhonikidze would be targeted next.

Some Old Bolsheviks insisted he was killed, though details from Zinaida and others refuted any plausible explanation for a murder. Khlevniuk has suggested that Ordzhonikidze was reluctant to openly challenge Stalin regarding wrecking in the NKTP, and instead only wanted to change his mind on the subject, and that instances of wreckers were highly exaggerated. Even to do that would take a massive toll on Ordzhonikidze's health, which was already in a weakened state. That several other Bolsheviks had committed suicide over political affairs previously also gave credence to the idea that Ordzhonikidze killed himself.

Details of Ordzhonikidze's death were not widely discussed within the Soviet Union until Nikita Khrushchev gave his "Secret Speech" criticizing Stalinism in 1956, and this helped keep rumours of a targeted killing alive. In the speech, Khrushchev suggested Ordzhonikidze shot himself because of the stress from Stalin's persecutions.

=== Aftermath ===
After Ordzhonikidze's death, both his family and those associated with him in the NKTP were targeted for reprisals; Khlevniuk suggests that this was because Stalin was not happy with Ordzhonikidze's criticism of the hunt for alleged wreckers. Papulia was tortured and eventually shot in November 1937, while Papulia's wife Nina was arrested and sentenced to ten years imprisonment on 29 March 1938, and re-sentenced to death on 14 June.

Ordzhonikidze's other brother, Konstantine, was also arrested and sent to the Gulag before being executed, along with his nephew Giorgi Gvakharia, while Zinaida was sentenced to ten years in the camps. Zinaida was released in 1956 and lived a relatively quiet life afterwards. She published a memoir of Ordzhonikidze's life that was first released in 1956, and died in 1960.

== Personality ==
=== Leadership ===
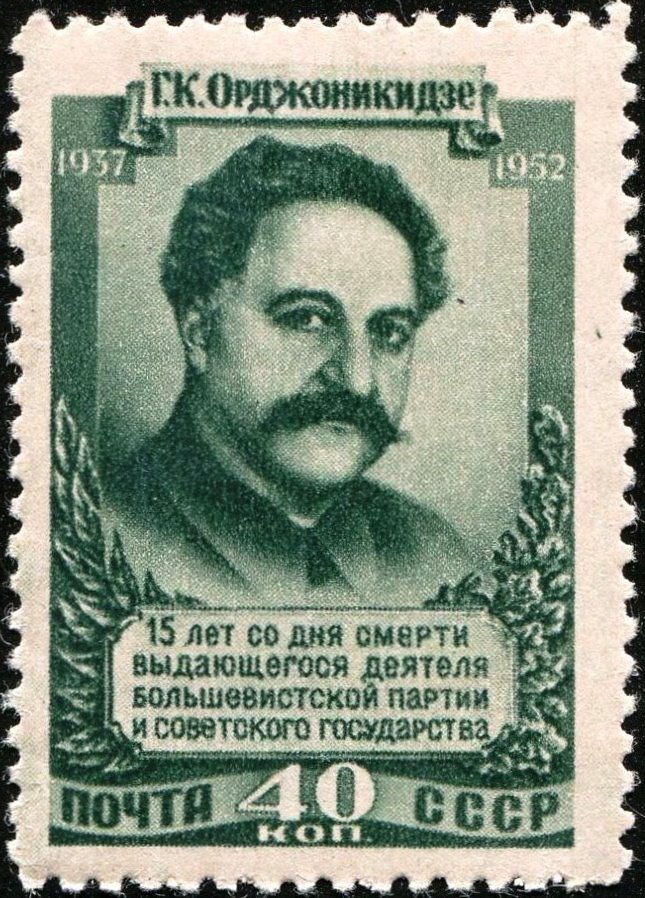
Ordzhonikidze on a 1952 Soviet Union postage stamp

Throughout his time in the Caucasus, Ordzhonikidze was known as a difficult man to work with. He was controversial within the regional Bolshevik leadership for being authoritarian and having a preference to promote fellow ethnic Georgians rather than qualified candidates. Near the end of 1920, a Cheka (secret police) representative had asked for Ordzhonikidze to be replaced, accusing him of policy errors, specifically his appointing nationalists to positions of authority, which went against Bolshevik policy that frowned upon nationalism.

At the Tenth Party Congress, held in March 1921, there were calls for Ordzhonikidze not to be re-elected; delegates from the North Caucasus stated that Ordzhonikidze, who was unable to attend due to the invasion of Georgia, "yells at everyone, orders everyone around him, ignores the opinions of loyal party members". He was defended by Lenin and Stalin: the former revealed that Ordzhonikidze was deaf in one ear and so had to shout, even at Lenin himself, to hear himself. With this backing, the critiques of Ordzhonikidze's leadership style were downplayed, and he was re-elected as a delegate.

During the invasions of Azerbaijan, Armenia, and Georgia, Ordzhonikidze also tended to act independently. He would often ignore any advice, including from the leadership in Moscow, and would only listen to those close to him. During the invasion of Georgia, he would make demands of Moscow, rather than ask for assistance, and ignored calls to work with local Georgian Bolsheviks, which caused tension between them and Ordzhonikidze.

=== Health ===
Throughout his adult life, Ordzhonikidze suffered from severe ill-health. After his death, a medical bulletin reported he had sclerosis and had tuberculosis earlier in his life, which led to the removal of his left kidney in 1929. He had also dealt with stenocardia and cardiac asthma for two years before his death, with a serious bout of asthma in November 1936. In 1928 he had spent several weeks in Germany for unspecified medical treatments. Due to his poor health, in January 1936, the Politburo had forced Ordzhonikidze to limit his schedule and take more time off from his duties.

== Legacy ==
Several towns and districts in the Soviet Union were renamed after Ordzhonikidze; the largest city was Vladikavkaz, the capital of North Ossetia, which became Ordzhonikidze in 1931. Throughout the 1930s many factories and plants also asked to take on his name, which is something Fitzpatrick notes may have annoyed Stalin. After Ordzhonikidze's death the process was reversed, so by 1942 nearly every town had changed names again. The only exception was Vladikavkaz: it took on Dzaudzhikau, the Ossetian variant of the name, from 1944 to 1954, before returning to Ordzhonikidze until 1990, when it returned to the original name.

Two ships (Ordzhonikidze, a Sverdlov-class cruiser and MS Grigoriy Ordzhonikidze, an ocean liner) were named after Ordzhonikidze. In addition, the Baltic Shipyard was named after him for a time, and the Sevastopol Shipyard in Crimea currently bears his name.

== See also ==
- Outline of the Russian Revolution and Civil War
- Bibliography of the Russian Revolution and Civil War
- Bibliography of Stalinism and the Soviet Union
- Index of Old Bolsheviks
- Index of articles related to the Russian Revolution and Civil War

== Bibliography ==
- Altstadt, Audrey L. (1992), The Azerbaijani Turks: Power and Identity under Russian Rule, Stanford, California: Hoover Institution Press, ISBN 0-8179-9182-4
- Bailes, Kendall E. (1978), Technology and Society under Lenin and Stalin: Origins of the Soviet Technical Intelligentsia, 1917–1941, Princeton, New Jersey: Princeton University Press, ISBN 0-691-05265-4
- Benvenuti, Francesco (1995), "A Stalinist Victim of Stalinism: 'Sergo' Ordzhonikidze'", in Cooper, Julian; Perrie, Maureen; Rees, E.A. (eds.), Soviet History, 1917–51: Essays in Honour of R.W. Davies, New York City: St. Martin's Press, pp. 134–157, ISBN 978-0-312-12615-5
- Blank, Stephen (1994), The Sorcerer as Apprentice: Stalin as Commissar of Nationalities, 1917–1924, Westport, Connecticut: Greenwood Press, ISBN 0-313-28683-3
- Bursa, G. R. F. (April 1985), "Political Changes of Names in Soviet Towns", The Slavonic and East European Review, 63 (2): 161–193, JSTOR 4209080
- Conquest, Robert (1990), The Great Terror: A Reassessment, New York City: Oxford University Press, ISBN 0-19-505580-2
- Dubinskiy-Mukhadze, I. (1963), Орджоникидзе [Ordzhonikidze] (in Russian), Moscow: Moloday Gvardiya
- Elwood, Carter (2011), The Non-Geometric Lenin: Essays on the Development of the Bolshevik Party 1910–1914, London: Anthem Press, ISBN 978-0-85728-778-6
- Fitzpatrick, Sheila (2015), On Stalin's Team: The Years of Living Dangerously in Soviet Politics, Princeton, New Jersey: Princeton University Press, ISBN 978-0-691-14533-4
- Fitzpatrick, Sheila (April 1985), "Ordzhonikidze's Takeover of Vesenkha: A Case Study in Soviet Bureaucratic Politics", Soviet Studies, 37 (2): 153–172, doi:10.1080/09668138508411576
- Fitzpatrick, Sheila (September 1979), "Stalin and the Making of a New Elite, 1928–1939", Slavic Review, 38 (3): 377–402, doi:10.2307/2496711, JSTOR 2496711, S2CID 197767739
- Kazemzadeh, Firuz (1951), The Struggle for Transcaucasia (1917–1921), New York City: Philosophical Library, OCLC 459737452
- Knight, Amy W. (1993), Beria: Stalin's First Lieutenant, Princeton, New Jersey: Princeton University Press, ISBN 0-691-03257-2
- Khlevniuk, Oleg V. (1995), In Stalin's Shadow: The Career of "Sergo" Ordzhonikidze, translated by Nordlander, David J., Aramonk, New York: M. E. Sharpe, ISBN 1-56324-563-9
- Khlevniuk, Oleg V. (2009), Master of the House: Stalin and His Inner Circle, translated by Seligman Favorov, Nora, New Haven, Connecticut: Yale University Press, ISBN 978-0-300-11066-1
- Khlevniuk, O. (1997), "The People's Commissariat of Heavy Industry", in Rees, E. A. (ed.), Decision Making in the Stalinist Command Economy, 1932–1937, Houndmills, Hampshire: Macmillan Press, pp. 94–123, ISBN 0-333-67757-9
- Kotkin, Stephen (2014), Stalin, Volume I: Paradoxes of Power, 1878–1928, New York City: Penguin Press, ISBN 978-1-59420-379-4
- Kotkin, Stephen (2017), Stalin, Volume II: Waiting for Hitler, 1929–1941, New York City: Penguin Press, ISBN 978-1-59420-380-0
- Kvashonkin, Aleksandr V. (January–June 1997), "Советизация Закавказья в переписке большевистского руководства 1920–1922 гг" [Sovietization of Transcaucasia in the correspondence of the Bolshevik leadership of 1920–1922], Cahiers du Monde russe (in Russian), 38 (1/2): 163–194, doi:10.3406/cmr.1997.2487
- Löwenhardt, John; Ozinga, James R.; van Ree, Erik (1992), The Rise and Fall of the Soviet Polutburo, New York City: St. Martin's Press, ISBN 0-312-04784-3
- Marshall, Alex (2010), The Caucasus Under Soviet Rule, Abington, Oxfordshire: Routledge, ISBN 978-0-415-62542-5
- Martin, Terry (2001), The Affirmative Action Empire: Nations and Nationalism in the Soviet Union, 1923–1939, Ithaca, New York: Cornell University Press, ISBN 978-0-80-143813-4
- Montefiore, Simon Sebag (2007), Young Stalin, London: Phoenix, ISBN 978-0-297-85068-7
- Murray, John (2000), Politics and Place-Names: Changing Names in the Late Soviet Period, Birmingham: Department of Russian, University of Birmingham, ISBN 978-0-704-42180-6
- Ordzhonikidze, Z. (1967) [1957], Путь большевика: Страницы из жизни Г.К. Орджоникидзе [The Path of a Bolshevik: Pages from the Life of G. K. Ordzhonikidze] (in Russian), Moscow: Izdatel'stvo Politichekoi Literatury
- Pipes, Richard (1964), The Formation of the Soviet Union: Communism and Nationalism, 1917–1923 (Revised ed.), Cambridge, Massachusetts: Harvard University Press, LCCN 64021284
- Rayfield, Donald (2012), Edge of Empires: A History of Georgia, London: Reaktion Books, ISBN 978-1-78023-030-6
- Rees, E. A. (1987), State Control in Soviet Russia: The Rise and Fall of the Workers' and Peasants' Inspectorate, 1920–1934, New York City: St. Martin's Press, ISBN 0-312-00767-1
- Rieber, Alfred J. (2015), Stalin and the Struggle for Supremacy in Eurasia, Cambridge, Cambridgeshire: Cambridge University Press, ISBN 978-1-107-42644-3
- Schlögel, Karl (2012), Moscow 1937, translated by Livingstone, Rodney, Cambridge, Cambridgeshire: Polity, ISBN 978-0-7456-5076-0
- Scott, Erik R. (2016), Familiar Strangers The Georgian Diaspora and the Evolution of Soviet Empire, Oxford: Oxford University Press, ISBN 978-0-19-939637-5
- Siegelbaum, Lewis H. (1988), Stakhanovism and the Politics of Productivity in the USSR, 1935–1941, Cambridge, Cambridgeshire: Cambridge University Press, ISBN 0-521-34548-0
- Shearer, David R. (1996), Industry, State, and Society in Stalin's Russia, 1926–1934, Ithaca, New York: Cornell University Press, ISBN 0-8014-3207-3
- Smith, Jeremy (May 1998), "The Georgian Affair of 1922. Policy Failure, Personality Clash or Power Struggle?", Europe-Asia Studies, 50 (3): 519–544, doi:10.1080/09668139808412550
- Suny, Ronald Grigor (1994), The Making of the Georgian Nation (Second ed.), Bloomington, Indiana: Indiana University Press, ISBN 978-0-253-20915-3
- Swietochowski, Tadeusz (1985), Russian Azerbaijan, 1905–1920: The Shaping of National Identity in a Muslim Community, Cambridge, Cambridgeshire: Cambridge University Press, ISBN 0-521-26310-7
- Zenkovich, Nikolai (2005), Самые секретные родственники [The Most Secret Families] (in Russian), Moscow: OLMA-Press, ISBN 5-94850-408-5
