= Ralph Hewins =

British biographer

Ralph Hewins (1909 – 1984) was a British biographer. Amongst his most famous works are Count Folke Bernadotte: his Life and Work (1949), The Richest American: J. Paul Getty (1960) and the Vidkun Quisling biography Quisling: Prophet without Honour (1965), which was translated into Norwegian (titled Quisling: profet uten ære). The biography of Quisling stirred much controversy in Norway, owing to its apologetic and revisionist portrayal of the Nazi collaborationist Quisling.
