= Filipp Makharadze =

Soviet Georgian revolutionary and government official (1868–1941)

- ფილიპე მახარაძე
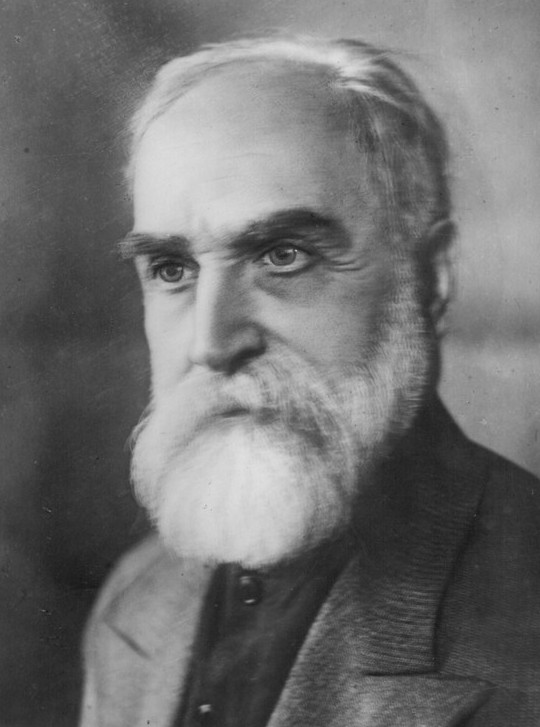
- Makharadze in 1938

Chairman of the Council of People's Commissars of the Georgian SSR
- In office 1929–1931
- Preceded by: Lavrenty Kartvelishvili
- Succeeded by: Vladimir Sukhishivili

Chairman of the Presidium of the Supreme Soviet of the Georgian SSR
- In office 10 July 1938 – 10 December 1941
- Preceded by: Position established
- Succeeded by: Georgy Sturua

Personal details
- Born: 9 March 1868 Kutais Governorate, Caucasus Viceroyalty, Russian Empire
- Died: 10 December 1941 (aged 73) Tbilisi, Georgian Soviet Socialist Republic, Soviet Union
- Resting place: Mtatsminda Pantheon
- Party: RSDLP (Bolsheviks) (1903–1918); All-Union Communist Party (b) (1918–1941)
- Other political affiliations: Communist Party of Georgia
- Education: Tbilisi Spiritual Seminary
- Awards: Order of Lenin

Filipp Yeseyevich Makharadze (Georgian: ფილიპე მახარაძე, Russian: Фили́пп Иесе́евич Махара́дзе; 9 March 1868 – 10 December 1941) was a Georgian Bolshevik revolutionary and government official.

== Life ==
Born in the village of Shemokmedi (Guria, Georgia), Makharadze studied at the Theological Seminary in Tbilisi and later graduated from the Veterinary Institute of Warsaw (Poland).

He joined the Social Democratic movement in 1891 and participated in activities in Georgia and Azerbaijan. In 1903, he joined the Caucasian Joint Committee of the Russian Social Democratic Labour Party and played an active role in the 1905 Revolution in the Caucasus; he was allegedly involved in the assassination of the prominent Georgian public figure Ilia Chavchavadze in 1907.

In 1907–1915, he led various Bolshevik groups in Transcaucasia and, after the February Revolution, he co-founded the Tbilisi Soviet of Workers' Deputies. In April 1917, he was elected as a delegate to the 7th RSDRP(B) Conference and served in the Bolshevik Caucasian Region Committee. In 1919–1920, he led Bolshevik groups resisting the Menshevik government of independent Georgia. After the Soviet takeover of Georgia, he became chairman of the Georgian Revolutionary Committee in February 1921 and then directed the Georgian Central Executive Committee. In 1922, Makharadze was involved in the Georgian Affair alongside Polikarp Mdivani and others; their group opposed Sergo Ordzhonikidze's designs with respect to Georgia.

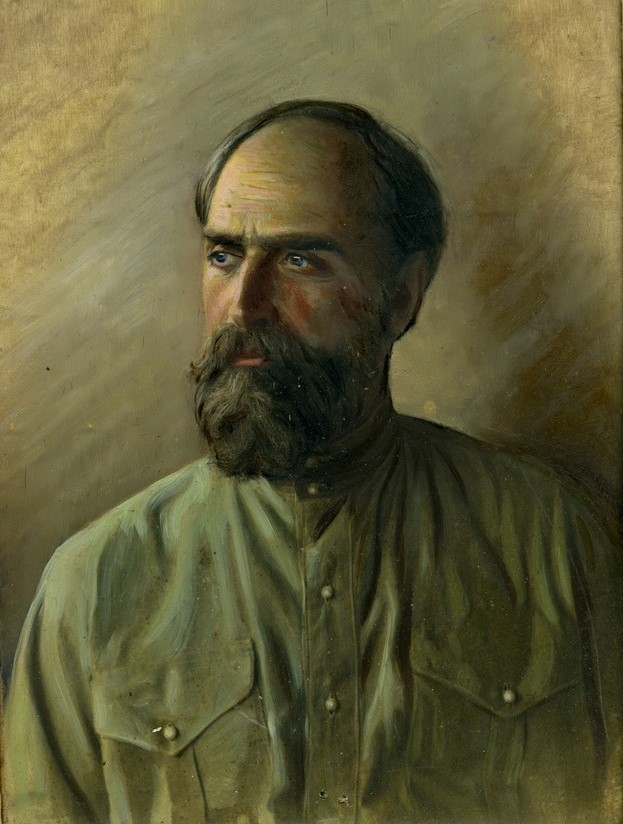
Portrait of Filip Makharadze

Over the next decade, Makharadze headed the Transcaucasian SFSR Gosplan, the Georgian Council of People's Commissars and the Transcaucasian SFSR Central Executive Committee. In 1938, he became the Chairman of the Presidium of Supreme Soviet of the Georgian SSR and later rose to the position of deputy presidium chairman of the USSR Supreme Soviet. He attended the 12th through 18th Congresses of the Communist Party and directed the Institute of Marxism–Leninism.

During his political career, Makharadze also authored a number of works, including monographs on Alexander Pushkin and Maxim Gorky, and books on the history of the Bolshevik revolutionary movement in Transcaucasia (1927), on the Soviets and the struggle for Soviet power in Georgia (1928), on the history of Georgia in the 19th century (1932), and the history of the workers' and peasants' movement in Georgia (1932).

== Awards ==
- Order of Lenin (February 24, 1941)
- Order of the Red Banner of Labour of the Transcaucasian Soviet Federative Socialist Republic

== See also ==
- Georgian Affair
- Polikarp Mdivani
