= All the Seas of the World =

2022 novel by Guy Gavriel Kay

- Author: Guy Gavriel Kay
- Language: English
- Genre: Fantasy
- Publisher: Viking Press
- Publication date: 2022
- Publication place: Canada
- Pages: 528
- ISBN: 9780735244719

All the Seas of the World is a historical fantasy novel by Canadian writer Guy Gavriel Kay published May 17, 2022 by Viking Press. It is inspired by Renaissance Italy, the Mediterranean, and North Africa.

It is a pseudo-sequel, occurring five years after the events in A Brightness Long Ago, but readable as a stand-alone novel. All the Seas of the World uses events based on the Barbary Coast slave trade and the expulsion of Jews from Spain to explore the themes of power, vengeance, trauma, recovery, and belonging through the two protagonists: Rafel ben Natan and Nadia bint Dhiyan (Lenia Serrano).

The dust jacket cover art of the Canadian and US editions was created by Lisa Jager.

== Plot ==
This novel takes place in the same world as The Lions of Al-Rassan, The Sarantine Mosaic, The Last Light of the Sun, Children of Earth and Sky, A Brightness Long Ago, and Written on the Dark. As in the other novels, the three main religions of the Jaddites, Kindath and Asharites presented based on Christianity, Judaism, and Islam, respectively. This story take place five years after the fall of Sarantium.

The story centers on Rafel ben Natan, a Kindath merchant, and occasional corsair, and his partner, Nadia bint Dhiyan, later Lenia Serrano, a former slave escaped from Osmanli captivity. Rafel and Nadia are contracted by Zariq and Ziyar ibn Tihon, khalifs of neighbouring Tarouz, based on historical brothers Hayreddin Barbarossa and Aruj Barbarossa to undertake the assassination the Khalif of Abeneven, Kay's parallel to Algiers.

While the assassination does not go according to plan, Rafel and Nadia, find themselves wealthy as a result of the contract and no longer on the periphery of events, but rather at the centre of them. Rafel and Nadia eventually join forces with Folco Cino d'Acorsi, one of the central figures of A Brightness Long Ago, and undertake to finance the construction a warship.

Rafel and Nadia's journey eventually brings them into contact with Guidanio Cerra, another central character from A Brightness Long Ago.

== Reception ==
Robert J. Wiersema, writing for the Toronto Star, describes the books as "a thrilling and exciting reading experience, and one which will more than satisfy fans of Kay's fiction." Wiersema notes that this a book informed by loss; the book is dedicated to Kay's mother, and All the Seas of the World "has an elegiac quality, an aching awareness of the temporary nature of lives, empires, worlds".

Wiersema acknowledges that "it's not quite the third book in a trilogy, it's much closer to that than it is to a stand-alone" and reading this book on its own "would rob the reader of the complexity of Kay's vision and the interrelatedness of the world he has created."

Writing for Locus, Gary K. Wolfe stated that "the catalog of these characters offered at the beginning of the novel at first might seem intimidating... the on-the-ground tale is a model of clarity and focus" and that All the Seas of the World "is as rich a tapestry as we've come to expect from Kay – perhaps one of the richest."

Noah Fram, writing for Bookpage, described Kay as "a master of telling small stories in a big world".

Bill Capossere described Kay as "A master working at the top of his craft" and that All the Seas of the World was "meticulously crafted in structure, pace, language, dialogue." Capossere stated that this book embodied the hallmark "joy mingled with sorrow", for which Kay is so well known: "the joy of first anticipating and then experiencing it. The sorrow of turning that last page."

Capossere praised Kay's ability to craft strong female characters which remained grounded, as there was no "hand-waving away of the true circumstances of a woman's life in this time in these places."

== Awards ==
All the Seas of the World was nominated for the 2023 Aurora Award for Best Novel, finishing second.
