= Written on the Dark =

2025 novel by Guy Gavriel Kay

- Author: Guy Gavriel Kay
- Language: English
- Genre: Fantasy
- Publisher: Viking Press
- Publication date: 2025
- Publication place: Canada
- Pages: 320
- ISBN: 9781037800504

Written on the Dark is a historical fantasy novel by Canadian writer Guy Gavriel Kay published May 27, 2025 by Viking Press. It is inspired by 15th century France and the Hundred Years' War. Specifically, it depicts versions of the figures Charles VI, Joan of Arc, and Henry V's campaign in France culminating in the Battle of Agincourt, while the story focuses on the life and deeds of a tavern poet, inspired by François Villon. The book uses major historical events as a backdrop to convey the themes of power and justice, and of women finding a space for themselves and their desires in the world. It is set in the same fantasy world as his recent novels, but in Ferrieres, Kay's analogue of France.

The dust jacket cover art of the Canadian and US editions was created by Lisa Jager.

== Plot ==
This novel takes place in the same world as The Lions of Al-Rassan, The Sarantine Mosaic, The Last Light of the Sun, Children of Earth and Sky, A Brightness Long Ago, and All the Seas of the World. As in the other novels, the three main religions of the Jaddites, Kindath and Asharites are presented based on Christianity, Judaism, and Islam, respectively. Events take place before the cataclysmic fall of Sarantium.

The story is set in Orane, the capital of Ferrieres, and opens with the character Thierry Villar heading out into a cold winter night to burgle a sanctuary in order to pay off a gambling debt. Villar, after being intercepted by the Provost of Orane, Robbin de Vaux, is compelled to abandon his planned heist and assist with the investigation into the brutal murder of Duke Rollin de Montereau (inspired by Louis I), brother to the mad king. Thierry is chosen because of his ability to converse with the ordinary folk of the city and his reputation in the taverns of Orane.

When it becomes apparent the murder was orchestrated by the king's cousin Laurent, Duke de Barratin (inspired by John the Fearless), Ferrieres finds itself on the brink of civil war, while King Hardan of Angland launches a cross channel invasion to reignite the generations-old conflict between the two kingdoms. When Thierry's investigation brings him into contact with renowned court poet, Marina di Seressa, whom he befriends and introduces him to court, Thierry finds himself forced to navigate the royal court of a kingdom on the verge of both civil war and invasion, while still pursuing his craft and seeking to protect those he cares for.

In the Epilogue, Medor Colle fights beside the last Emperor of Sarantium as well as a soldier and a cleric from Batiara. These are Trussio Monticola and Nardo Sarzerola from A Brightness Long Ago. Later in the Epilogue, Thierry visits a sanctuary in Varena to view the mosaics of the courts of Valerius II and Valerius III, which were crafted by Crispin of The Sarantine Mosaic.

== Reception ==
In a review for The Globe and Mail, David Moscrop praised Written on the Dark for its "accessibility and its density".

Bill Capossere described Written on the Dark as "classic Kay in its elegant warmth, masterful use of POV, careful twisting of history, and admixture of the sweet and sorrowful" and a must read. Rob Rhodes noted that despite being about half the length as many of Kay's other works, the result was no less memorable. Kay was also praised for handling of prominent LGBTQ+ characters, stating that it is "not that their identity and sexuality solely define them or their deeds. They're fully realized characters — people — like those who occupy our world."

Gary K. Wolfe, writing for Locus, stated that in Written on the Dark, Kay has created some of his "most memorable characters."

Judith Starkston, writing for Historical Novel Society, praised Kay's "graceful language" and described Written on the Dark as a "masterful contribution to Kay's celebrated fictional world".

The novel was nominated for the 2026 Aurora Award for Best Novel.
