= Mel Odom (artist) =

American artist (born 1950)

- Born: September 2, 1950 (age 76); Richmond, Virginia, U.S.
- Known for: Illustration, doll design
- Movement: Art Deco
- Awards: Society of Illustrators Gold Medal (1982)

Mel Odom (born September 2, 1950) is an American artist who has created book covers for numerous novels, including a number of paperback editions of the novels of Patrick White, the Australian winner of the Nobel Prize for Literature, and several books by fantasy author Guy Gavriel Kay such as The Fionavar Tapestry trilogy, Tigana, A Song for Arbonne, and The Lions of Al-Rassan. Dreamer, a collection of his work, with an introduction by Edmund White, was published by Penguin Books in 1984. Odom is also the designer of the Gene Marshall collectible fashion doll.

== Early life ==
Odom was born in Richmond, Virginia, USA, and grew up in Ahoskie, North Carolina, where his parents encouraged his interests in drawing and in dolls. He majored in fashion illustration at Virginia Commonwealth University and then attended Leeds Polytechnic Institute of Art and Design in England for graduate work before moving to New York City in 1975.

== Career ==
His Art Deco-like style established him as a commercial artist, at first via erotic illustrations for sexually oriented magazines such as Blueboy, Viva, and Playboy, the last of which named him their "Illustrator of the Year" in 1980.. In 1979 he provided the cover art for Penguin's paperback edition of Edmund White's novel Nocturnes for the King of Naples.

During the 1980s, his work covered many commercial media. He created album covers for CBS Records and book covers for numerous other novels, usually in the genres of fantasy, mystery, or horror. He provided illustrations for the science/science-fiction magazine OMNI and (in 1989) a front cover for Time magazine. He also received professional recognition from his peers, receiving the Society of Illustrators's Gold Medal (Editorial category) in 1982 and a Silver Medal (Book category) in 1987. He has exhibited his work in New York City at the Cooper-Hewitt Museum and the Society of Illustrators.

Edmund White wrote in his Introduction to Dreamer: "Mel Odom's work represents an original synthesis of...two moments in the history of taste: a recuperation of art-nouveau perversities of the past but in a shiny, shadowless, innocently hedonistic space....In Mel Odom's world the perverse has become at last a candid pleasure...a vision of utopia."

In 1990, Odom proposed to design the cosmetic facepaint for Mdvanii, a 25 cm limited-edition collector's fashion doll. The experience renewed his childhood interest in dolls and led him to create a doll of his own, the 15.5" Gene Marshall. The creation of Gene Marshall helped him cope with the experience of his best friend dying of AIDS.

Gene Marshall's appearance, wardrobes, and history are modelled on the glamour of Hollywood's golden age from the 1920s through 1950s. The doll made its commercial debut at the 1995 Toy Fair and was an immediate success, creating a wider market for large, fully articulated collector's fashion dolls in contrast to the slightly smaller and less flexible Barbie doll. Since then, Odom has largely concentrated his professional pursuits on the Gene Marshall doll, regularly modifying her design to create new variations and creating similar companion dolls to share her world, such as Gene's "co-stars" Madra Lord, Violet Waters, and Trent Osborn.

Odom continues to attend doll collectors' conventions to make personal appearances and buy dolls for his own collection, as well as to support charitable causes. At a 1997 doll convention entirely devoted to Gene Marshall, a charity auction of uniquely modified Gene dolls raised more than $30,000 for Gay Men's Health Crisis, an AIDS service organization.
