= The Sarantine Mosaic =

Pair of historical fantasy novels by Guy Gavriel Kay

First Omnibus edition (publ. Science Fiction Book Club) Cover artist: Tom Kidd

The Sarantine Mosaic is a historical fantasy duology by Canadian writer Guy Gavriel Kay, comprising Sailing to Sarantium (1998) and Lord of Emperors (2000). The titles of the novels allude to works by poet W. B. Yeats.

The story's setting is based on the 6th-century Mediterranean world, and the looming conflict between the Eastern Roman Empire and the Ostrogothic kingdom of Italy that had replaced the Western Roman Empire. Varena, the capital of Batiara, alludes to Ravenna, the Ostrogothic capital, while Sarantium, the capital of the Sarantine Empire, is inspired by Byzantium or Constantinople. The novels The Lions of Al-Rassan, The Last Light of the Sun, and A Brightness Long Ago also take place in that unnamed world, although in different settings. In the series the audience is also briefly acquainted with the character Ashar ibn Ashar, who is the creator of the Asharite religion seen in The Lions of Al-Rassan. The seeds of change for the great empire based in Sarantium are thus already being sown even at the height of its power and prestige.

== Sailing to Sarantium ==
Sailing to Sarantium, the first novel in the saga, was published in 1998. In this novel, mosaicist Caius Crispus ("Crispin"), is summoned from Varena to the great metropolis of Sarantium to create a mosaic for Emperor Valerius II (modelled on Byzantine emperor Justinian I). Crispin has lost his family to plague, and has nothing left to him except his mosaic art, for which he is earning attention. The narration follows his travels from the relatively civilized Batiara through the wilder region of Sauradia, where he has an encounter with a creature of supernatural aspect resembling a bison, to Sarantium itself and his compelled entrance into the politics of the metropolis, centred on Valerius and his consort, the Empress Alixana (modelled on Justinian's empress, Theodora). While Crispin is a central focus of the book, there are other stories interwoven with his. Overcoming loss (loss of family, loss of the past), rebuilding (life, civilization), journey as change and the importance of art to the individual creator and to civilization itself are themes of the novel. The title and much of the thematic development alludes to the poem Sailing to Byzantium, a work of the Irish poet William Butler Yeats.

Plot

Emperor Apius of Sarantium dies without any heirs, leaving the empire in uncertainty. Petrus of Trakesia plans to have his uncle, Valerius of Trakesia, the Count of the Excubitors (Imperial Guard), become the next emperor. He plants his own men among the different factions to make, and purposely botch, an attempt to have them support Flavius Daleinus, a rich and influential aristocrat with plans to become emperor, thus discrediting Flavius's name. At the same time, and also ordered by Petrus, Flavius is murdered on the streets with Sarantine fire while wearing porphyry, a colour exclusive to royalty, and his eldest son is left hideously burned. Valerius is then appointed as the new Emperor by popular demand.

Fifteen years later, Petrus has succeeded his uncle, naming himself Valerius II and making Alixana, formerly Aliana, his empress. Valerius II commissions a great sanctuary to Jad and summons Martinian of Batiara, a renowned mosaicist, to decorate it. The royal request is sent with Pronobius Tilliticus, an Imperial Courier, who delays delivery of the message while pursuing personal pleasure along the road. Martinian, partially on whim and partially believing himself too old to travel, causes Tilliticus to mistake his friend and colleague Caius Crispus ("Crispin") of Rhodias for him, delivering the message in a public fashion. Crispin is reluctant to accept the prestigious summons, having lost the desire to live when his wife and two daughters died of the plague the previous year. The summons having been much delayed, the season no longer allows Crispin to sail to Sarantium; he must take the road. Martinian sends Crispin to talk to his old and well-traveled friend Zoticus for advice on his journey. Zoticus reveals himself to have some supernatural powers and gives Crispin a mechanical bird, Linon, that is alive, being able to both talk to him aloud and within his mind. He also gives Crispin the name of his daughter and another person in Sarantium who may be able to help him.

The night before he is to leave, Crispin is forcibly abducted and taken to Gisel, the queen of the Antae and ruler over Batiara and Rhodias. The Antae are suspicious that a woman, especially a young one, can rule effectively and Gisel is barely holding onto her throne and life after the recent death of her father. She gives Crispin a secret message to be given only to Emperor Valerius II: an offer of her hand in marriage, which would save her life and give Valerius the western kingdom as well as an heir, as the imperial couple is childless. The palace guards from that night are killed to protect the secret.

Crispin starts his journey under the assumed identity of Martinian, hiring a man named Vargos as his servant. The night before the Day of the Dead, during which Zoticus warned him not to travel, Crispin arrives at an inn where a slave girl, Kasia, begs him to save her, having figured out she is to be given as a human sacrifice to the pagan god on the Day of the Dead. Despite devising an ingenious plan that forces the innkeeper to give him ownership of Kasia, Crispin with his companions is still pursued as they leave the inn, deeming it necessary to travel on the Day of the Dead despite all warnings. They are saved by a zubir, a corporeal representation of the pagan god, which then brings them to the forested area where the human sacrifices are performed. Linon realizes the god wants only her, revealing that she was a girl to be sacrificed to the god long ago but her soul was saved and placed in the bird by Zoticus. She sacrifices herself, releasing her soul from the bird, and allowing the others to leave unharmed.

While admiring an old and impressive mosaic in a sanctuary along the road, Crispin is found by Carullus, a captain leading a squad of soldiers; he has been sent by Valerius due to extended time it has taken to respond to the Emperor's summons. After an initial rough encounter, resulting in Crispin being knocked unconscious by Carullus and Vargos and Kasia almost being raped and killed, the group slowly become friends as they finally arrive in Sarantium.

Shortly after arriving, Crispin is immediately summoned to the Emperor and the court, at a speed that is unheard of in the empire. Risking his life, Crispin reveals his true identity only to find out that the Emperor and Empress knew his and Martinian's deception from the beginning. Crispin quickly finds favour with them, causing the royal mosaicist to be dismissed and angering his sponsor, Styliane Daleina, the daughter of the murdered Flavius Daleina and new wife of Leontes (based on Belisarius), the beloved royal Strategos. The Emperor gives Crispin the honour of decorating the newly erected sanctuary, and Empress Alixana publicly invites Crispin for a private audience later that night.

Crispin's private audience with the Empress is interrupted by the Emperor and the two reveal that they know of Gisel's secret offer of marriage, while Crispin neither confirms or denies the message. It becomes clear that the Emperor will not put aside his beloved though believed to be barren wife - an assumed consequence of her former life as a dancer - but informs both that he had long since summoned the queen to Sarantium, where he plans to use her as an excuse to invade the west and reunite the kingdoms under his rule. The Emperor then brings Crispin to the sanctuary to show him where he is to work, before leaving him under the protection of Carullus to return home.

While returning home, Crispin is attacked by assassins, but survives due to the help of Carullus and the famous and beloved Scortius of the Blues, the most renowned charioteer of the city. Crispin returns to his room only to find Styliane Daleina there; she propositions him and is amused when he rejects her advances.

The next day, while relaxing in a bath house, Crispin finds himself alone with Leontes, the latter having arranged it to discuss his views on the blasphemy of depicting Jad in human form. Before leaving, Leontes exposes another armed assassin entering the sauna, giving Crispin just enough time to overcome his attacker while looking on and refusing to help.

Crispin makes contact with Zoticus's daughter, Shirin, principal dancer of the Greens. She is revealed to also have one of her father's birds whose thoughts Crispin is able to hear for unknown reasons. With the help of Vargos, it is learned that the assassins were hired by Pronobius Tilliticus as revenge for losing his job when Crispin indirectly revealed his inappropriate and disloyal services.

In Batiara, three Antae noblemen plot to murder Gisel during the dedication of the sanctuary where her father is to be buried. However, on the day of the assassination, it is discovered that the woman believed to be the queen is her servant in disguise. Gisel, with Zoticus's help, has fled to Sarantium. Zoticus, upon learning that the pagan god had not forgotten nor relinquished his right to the souls of the human sacrifices given to him, journeys to the forested area where Linon had sacrificed herself to the zubir. There he allows the remaining souls in his mechanical birds to be released back to the god and accepts his death from the zubir, a punishment from taking the souls of the sacrificed woman in the first place.

Crispin further entwines himself into court life and finds reason to continue living through his task of decorating the great sanctuary, through which he sees a chance of immortality. The book ends with an unknown female figure entering the sanctuary while Crispin is working, irresistibly drawing him down to greet her.

== Lord of Emperors ==
Lord of Emperors was published in 2000. The story continues from Sailing to Sarantium and tells of what happens to Crispin after his arrival in the city of Sarantium. Crispin has been charged with a project to cover the interior of the dome of a grand new religious building in Sarantium with a mosaic work. The confidant of both Alixana, the empress, and of the exiled Queen Gisel of Crispin's native Batiara (modelled on the Ostrogoth queen, Amalasuntha), Crispin struggles to survive the political machinations of the era and work on his mosaic. The reader is also introduced to Rustem of Kerakek, a physician from Bassania, an eastern empire roughly analogous to Sassanid Persia, who has also journeyed to the city, finding himself entangled in political intrigue. A significant theme of the book is the interplay between the lives of the politically powerful and the interests of the ordinary people, typified by the chariot races at the hippodrome which become an all-consuming passion for the people even as the empire draws closer to war and upheaval.

Plot

Rustem of Kerakek, a physician from Bassania, is summoned by Shirvan, the King of Kings of Bassania, after being wounded with a poisoned arrow. Rustem saves his life and helps reveal that it is the king's son who was behind the assassination attempt. Shirvan rewards the doctor with the promise of raising him to the priestly caste and making him a court physician. However, Shirvan first commands Rustem to go to Sarantium to act as his spy. He leaves behind his two wives and their children, a baby girl and a seven-year-old boy named Shaksi who is suggested to have unusual powers of perception. Shaksi's premonitions later compel the family to depart from Kerakek and follow Rustem to Sarantium.

In the capital, Crispin has further settled into his work of creating the mosaic in the sanctuary. He plans to immortalize his wife and daughters, as well as Linon and an image of the zubir, alongside Jad. Carullus has proposed to Kasia and their wedding draws together most of the influential people of the city through the help of their friends. Upon arriving in Sarantium, Rustem's servant (who is secretly his guard and protector) is murdered by a young aristocrat. In the process of fleeing for his life through the city, Rustem meets Crispin, who brings him to Kasia and Carullus's wedding. There Rustem discovers that the murderer of his servant is Cleander, the son of the Master of the Senate. He approaches the family and subtly blackmails the Senator with this information to secure himself a home and protection in the city as compensation. It is revealed that Rustem was the second person Zoticus had told Crispin to meet - somehow knowing the Bassanid would go to Sarantium long before his arrival. Rustem quickly establishes himself practicing medicine in the city but is disturbed when he receives an order from the King of Kings to assassinate a woman.

Emperor Valerius II makes it known to a few that he intends to wage war to reclaim Batiara in the name of Queen Gisel. Crispin, while at the house of Leontes, allows himself to be seduced by Styliane this time, and escapes through the window when Leontes returns. Styliane tells him of the upcoming invasion of his homeland and also warns him not to become attached to his work.

It is revealed that Empress Alixana was the woman who approached Crispin at the end of the first novel. She again comes to Crispin as he finishes his wife's image in the mosaic and is about to begin that of his daughters. She takes him on a boat ride under the premise of showing him dolphins, which she wishes him to put in a mosaic for her private chambers. This depiction is a dangerous one for the Empress to request due to dolphins' association with the god Heladikos, who some worship as the son of Jad but has been declared paganistic and heretical by the Patriarchs of the faith. The boat arrives at an island where Lecanus Daleinus, the oldest son of the assassinated Flavius Daleinus, is imprisoned; he was hideously burned and blinded by Sarantine Fire during the assassination. Alixana impersonates Styliane's voice to try get information from him. Crispin hears the thoughts of yet another mechanical bird talking to Lecanus in his head and realises that although Lecanus cannot see the Empress, he is not deceived. After they leave, he confesses what he heard to Alixana, who quickly deduces that an assassination attempt is being made on her husband. They return to Lecanus's hut only to find him gone and his guards killed. A guard attempts to assassinate Alixana but is stopped by Crispin. Alixana tells Crispin to return to the boat with one of her two remaining loyal guards and asks him how he found a reason to live after having lost his family. She returns to Sarantium on a small boat with her remaining guard, discarding her royal robes, cutting her hair, and changing her appearance. Upon arriving in the docks, she disappears into the crowds, disguised as a whore.

Emperor Valerius II is confronted by all three surviving Daleinoi children, including Styliane and Lecanus, in his personal passage between palaces, his guards having been bribed. He quickly deduces that they intend to kill him with Sarantine fire as revenge for the death of their father. He banters with them, trying to undermine each of them and their hold on the guards. He almost succeeds escaping, but is stabbed in the back by Leontes's secretary, Pertennius Eubulus - a man who hated the Emperor and Empress, perceiving them to be impious. Lecanus burns the Emperor's body along with the guards before allowing himself to be burned, taking the sole blame for the events.

The city erupts in a riot. Leontes is quickly chosen as the new Emperor while Styliane claimed to have arrived too late to stop her brother after learning of his plans. A citywide search for the Empress is started, with guards going from house to house. Rustem, returning home late after treating many riot victims, finds Empress Alixana in his bedroom. She quickly reveals she knew his goal as a spy and asks his help in hiding her while revealing that she knew he had already refused orders to assassinate Queen Gisel. It is also revealed Alixana had already visited the doctor in disguise as a commoner with fertility problems, and Rustem had informed her that she was not barren - thus the imperial couple's failure to conceive an heir is due to the Emperor's sterility. Rustem helps save her life as she pretends to be a prostitute when the Saratine soldiers break into the doctor's home. After the soldiers leave, Rustem allows Alixana to stay the night, finding her gone in the morning.

That same night, Gisel summons Crispin and has him help her slip into the palace. Gisel manages to meet with Leontes, persuading him to see Styliane's role in the whole event and convincing him to take her as his new wife. In doing so, the new emperor will have a means of re-taking Batiara while minimizing bloodshed. Styliane is blinded and imprisoned on the same isle her brother had been on, while her remaining brother is found and executed.

Based on information given to him by Alixana before her departure, Rustem realizes that he cannot return to Bassania or he will be killed by the King of Kings for his failure to assassinate Gisel. His family then arrives on his doorstep, accompanied by the soldier who first brought the doctor to Shirvan. Together, they decide that they will travel yet further west, to the peninsula of Esperana, and settle there.

Leontes explains to Crispin that all images of Jad are to be destroyed and images of humans and Jad in sanctuaries are seen as blasphemy. Crispin is crushed by the news that his mosaic is to be destroyed, seeing it as a second death of his wife and daughters. He decides to finish the images of his daughters before they are destroyed anyway, and once they are complete, that it is time to return home.

Crispin says goodbye to all his friends. He is summoned a final time by the new Empress Gisel, and is permitted to go visit Styliane before he leaves. Styliane asks Crispin to kill her, realizing life had nothing left for her in her current state and having already achieved her revenge. He refuses but leaves a dagger that Gisel had, knowingly, given him during their meeting. Shirin confronts Crispin before he leaves where she manages to get Crispin to indirectly indicate he has feelings for her and that she should perhaps eventually join him in Batiara.

Upon arriving home, Crispin finds Martinian and royal couriers waiting for him. Gisel has greatly rewarded him with wealth, as she had originally promised if he were to successfully deliver her message to Emperor Valerius II. She has also sent him materials from Sarantium, such as high-quality glass and stones, needed to create a great mosaic, promising the work would be protected as long as no image of Jad is made.

Crispin spends the next year making an elaborate mosaic in a small abandoned sanctuary, while Martinian decorates the adjoining larger and newer sanctuary in an appropriate way, finally having access to the great materials he had always dreamed of throughout his career. Crispin's mosaic depicts the newly appointed Emperor Valerius III (formerly Leontes) and Empress Gisel on one side and the former Emperor Valerius II and Empress Alixana on the other, with all the important figures of court that Crispin had known, including himself, around them.

In a mirror of the ending of the first book, just as Crispin finishes the last piece of his mosaic, a woman distracts him from his work. Assuming it is Shirin finally come to meet him, he is surprised to see Aliana, no longer Alixana after having disappeared that night. She comments on herself in the mosaic and the two of them realize that they have a reason in each other to continue living. The novel ends with the suggestion that they might have a child together.

== "Aliana in the West" drabble ==
In 2014, Guy Gavriel Kay wrote a 100-word drabble entitled "Aliana in the West" for The Pixel Project, a charitable campaign supporting efforts to end violence against women. Set after the events of The Sarantine Mosaic, the story serves as a brief epilogue to the duology. It follows Aliana as she reflects on her memories of Valerius and her life with Crispin before awakening to the cries of her daughter while carrying another child. The drabble was originally available only to donors to The Pixel Project before later being republished on Kay's official website, Bright Weavings, together with another drabble, "A Name", set before The Fionavar Tapestry.

== Characters ==
Aliana/Alixana - Once the most prominent actress and dancer in Sarantium, with allegiance to the Blues. She is the lover of Petrus, and becomes the Empress Alixana when Petrus succeeds his uncle.

Apius - The former emperor who dies at the beginning of the first novel. Without any legitimate heirs, Valerius I is appointed the next emperor by popular acclaim of the people.

Astorgus - Once a great chariot racer, now retired and leading the Blues faction.

Caius Crispus ("Crispin") - A skilled mosaicist from Varena, still mourning his wife and two daughters who died in a plague the year before. He travels to Sarantium to work on the new Sanctuary of Holy Wisdom there, and becomes entangled in the politics surrounding Valerius II and Alixana. Perceptive and articulate, with an imaginative but practical mind given to solving puzzles; he puts these skills to good use on his journey to Sarantium.

Carullus - a verbose and foul-mouthed cavalry officer sent to find "Martinian of Varena" (actually Crispin) on the road to Sarantium. Despite their hostile first encounter, the two soon become friends. Carullus eventually weds Kasia in an extravagant ceremony at Shirin's house. He is an aficionado of chariot racing, and supports the Greens.

Flavius Daleinus - A prominent aristocrat who sees himself as the logical successor of Emperor Apius. He received people as if in the role of emperor and dressed himself in the robes of an emperor as the city decided on Apius's successor. He is murdered on the street by Sarantine fire under the orders of Petrus.

Gesius - The Imperial Chancellor, a eunuch. He has kept his position under a succession of different emperors by being both subtle and shrewd.

Gisel - Queen of Batiara and the barbarian Antae people who rule there. Only eighteen, she has ruled for less than a year since her father's death, and is desperate to keep her throne and her life. She enlists the aid of Crispin as a discreet messenger, but an assassination attempt forces her to flee to Sarantium. She eventually becomes the wife of Leontes and Empress of Sarantium, bringing her country of Batiara peacefully into the Empire.

Kasia - A young girl willingly sold into slavery by her mother in exchange for food for her mother and sister. She is sold to an innkeeper, where she worked for a year before being marked as the human sacrifice for the Day of the Dead. She is saved by Crispin and brought to Sarantium. Carullus proposes to her and they are wed in an extravagant ceremony.

Leontes/Valerius III - Supreme Strategos of the Sarantine Empire, Valerius II's most trusted and successful commander, husband of Styliane Daleina. Deeply religious, he believes depictions of the god Jad to be sacrilegious. When Valerius II is assassinated, Leontes succeeds him as Emperor Valerius III, and orders Crispin's mosaic on the dome of the city sanctuary torn down.

Lecanus Daleinus - oldest son of Flavius Daleinus and older brother Styliane. Severely burned, blinded and crippled by the Sarantine fire that killed his father, he has lived ever since as a prisoner on a small island near the city. He eventually escapes with the help of his sister, and assassinates Valerius II.

Martinian - Senior mosaicist in Varena, Crispin's friend and mentor. Summoned by Valerius and Alixana to work on the new Sanctuary of Holy Wisdom in Sarantium, he urges Crispin to go in his place.

Pertennius of Eubulus - Principal Secretary to Leontes, charged with chronicling the exploits of the Supreme Strategos. He is obsessed with Shirin, and is seen to be writing a lurid (and possibly fabricated) secret history of Valerius and Alixana's reign.

Petrus/Valerius II - A peasant from Trakesia, summoned to Sarantium by his uncle Valerius I. He helps his uncle become Emperor and becomes his successor upon Valerius's death, taking the name Valerius II for himself. Without any living heirs, he wishes to leave his mark on the world by creating a great sanctuary to Jad and uniting the former kingdoms under his rule. He is murdered by the Daleinoi children in revenge for the murder of their father.

Plautus Bonosus - A wealthy Sarantine aristocrat and Master of the Senate, a largely ceremonial position. Urbane and sophisticated, he regards the politics around him with wry detachment.

Pronobius Tilliticus - An imperial courier charged with delivering the imperial invitation to Martinian. He delivers his message later than intended due to his many indiscretions while on the road. When these come to the attention of his superiors, he loses his job. Blaming this on Crispin, he hires assassins to kill him.

Rustem of Kerakek - A young but skilled physician from the eastern nation of Bassania. He is sent to Sarantium on a special task. While there he meets Crispin and Scortius, and saves the life of the latter. On the night of Valerius II's assassination, he hides Empress Alixana in his room. He has a young son, Shaski, who appears to possess some sort of clairvoyance.

Scortius - A chariot racer, formerly of the Greens and currently of the Blues, widely regarded as the best racer in Sarantium.

Shirin - Daughter of Zoticus and most prominent dancer of Sarantium in her time, mirroring the beginnings of Empress Alixana's career. She has a living mechanical bird given to her by her father.

Styliane Daleina - Daughter of Flavius Daleinus, who has been forced into a political marriage with Leontes. Beautiful but cold, she despises Valerius and Alixana, and desires above all else to avenge the death of her father.

Valerius I - A peasant from Trakesia who came to Sarantium and slowly rose in the ranks of the army to become Count of the Excubitors - the commander of the Imperial Guard. With the help of his nephew, he becomes the new Emperor on the death of Apius.

Vargos - A servant working along the Imperial route, hired by Crispin during his travels. He helps save the life of Kasia and comes to Sarantium with them. He helps Crispin creating the mosaic and it is implied that he will become an apprentice in the field.

Zoticus - An alchemist, once a young adventurer but now aged, who has discovered how to make living mechanical birds. He has given one to his daughter, Shirin, and another to Crispin.

== References to other novels ==
This novel takes place in the same world as The Lions of Al-Rassan, The Last Light of the Sun, Children of Earth and Sky, A Brightness Long Ago, All the Seas of the World, and Written on the Dark. As in the other novels, the three main religions of the Jaddites, Kindath and Asharites are presented based on Christianity, Judaism, and Islam, respectively. The events of the Sarantine Mosaic take place centuries before those of the other stories set in the shared world.

It is implied that Rustem is the ancestor of Rodrigo Belmonte from The Lions of Al-Rassan.

Despite taking place in a different universe, Arimonda, which serves as Kay's analogue to Spain in A Song for Arbonne, is mentioned in Lord of Emperors as source of leather.

== Reception ==
Reviewing Lord of Emperors, Charles de Lint praised both volumes, saying "Kay's books ring with authenticity. They are literate and imaginative, and work on many levels. History aficionados will delight in all the small and telling insights Kay brings to the era and its cultures, while other readers will simply delight in the grand sweep of the story, the rich characterization, and Kay's sheer gift with language."
