= The Darkest Road =

1986 novel by Guy Gavriel Kay

- First edition
- Author: Guy Gavriel Kay
- Cover artist: Martin Springett
- Language: English
- Series: The Fionavar Tapestry
- Genre: Fantasy novel
- Publisher: Arbor House
- Publication date: 1986
- Publication place: Canada
- Media type: Print (Hardback & Paperback)
- Pages: 424 pp
- ISBN: 0-00-223115-8 (first edition); ISBN 0451451805(1992 Roc edition)
- OCLC: 16055718
- Preceded by: The Wandering Fire

The Darkest Road is a 1986 fantasy novel by Canadian fantasy author Guy Gavriel Kay and the third and final novel in The Fionavar Tapestry trilogy. It follows The Summer Tree and The Wandering Fire.

== Plot summary ==
Kim and Matt, with the help of Tabor and Imraith-Nimphais, rescue the Paraiko. Ruana, their leader, chants kanior—a ritual of forgiveness and lamentation for the dead that is tied to the Paraiko's non-violent nature and the bloodcurse that protects them. So powerful is his performance that it invokes not only all the Paraiko that have died through the centuries but even their enemies; both he and Kim sense a finality in it, as is proven when the Baelrath blazes and summons Kim to change the Paraiko's pacifist natures so they can fight against Maugrim. Due to the loss of their pacifism, however, the magical bloodcurse that had protected the Paraiko for centuries was also lost forever.

Kim returns to Ysanne's cottage where she meets Darien and gives him the Circlet of Lisen. As she puts it on his head, the light of the gem goes out, and Darien interprets this as a sign that he is evil. In despair he takes Lökdal, the dagger that Ysanne used to kill herself, and flees. Kim calls after him to tell him where his mother is, hoping that Jennifer will be able to comfort him.

Jennifer, waiting in Lisen's tower for Prydwen to return, listens to Flidais' tale of the Wild Hunt and how its randomness, being outside the Weaver's control, gifts the Weaver's creatures with freedom of choice. That wildness also made Maugrim possible; and because Maugrim came from outside the Tapestry there is no thread in it with his name on it, Flidais explains, and so he cannot die.

Darien arrives at the tower, looking for love and acceptance. Believing as she does that their only hope lies in leaving Darien completely free, Jennifer tells him simply that he must make his own choice and that she will not influence it, except to say that his father wanted her dead so that he would never be born. Darien believes that his choice was made for him when the light of Lisen's Circlet went out and so departs to seek his father. Prydwen returns in the midst of a terrible storm and Jennifer immediately sends Lancelot away, charging him to follow Darien and protect him. Lancelot battles an ancient stone creature of the wood, a demon named Curdardh, only managing to defeat it with Darien's help. In a moment of clarity Darien realizes that his mother sent him away because she is not afraid of what he will do if he is left free to choose: she trusts him. Lancelot finally loses sight of Darien as he crosses Daniloth in the form of a white owl.

Meanwhile, the Dalrei, the lios alfar, and the men of Brennin and Cathal are gathering on the plain to face Maugrim's army. Jaelle's view of men as lesser beings has been challenged by Kevin's unflinching sacrifice and she and Paul/Pwyll begin to tentatively shape a friendship. As they talk on the shore below Lisen's Tower, a ghostly ship appears to take all of them to Andarien in time to meet Aileron and the rest of the host of the Light.

Loren, Matt and Kim return to the kingdom of the dwarves where Matt competes against Kaen and Blöd to regain his rightful position as King of the Dwarves. The Crystal Dragon of Calor Diman awakens but despite the blazing summons of the Baelrath, Kim refuses to bind it to help them against Maugrim, realizing that she still has the power to choose and that there is a point where the ends do not justify the means. She uses the ring's power instead to take Loren, Matt and herself to the Plain in time for Matt to reclaim the Dwarves and lead them to join the rest of the forces opposing Maugrim's hordes.

A giant urgach issues a challenge to single combat and Arthur, hearing that the name of the plain was once Camlann, recognizes that his time has come: "I never see the end." But while they debate, Diarmuid seizes the moment and takes the challenge on himself. He fights brilliantly and kills the urgach but is mortally wounded, and dies in Sharra's arms. The next morning the battle begins. Among Maugrim's army are Avaia and her black brood of swans and, more terribly, a giant black dragon. Kim, realizing that it was for this the Baelrath had demanded the Crystal Dragon, is sick with self-reproach but Imraith-Nimphais and Tabor fight valiantly and kill many of the swans. Finally, realizing there is only one way to defeat the dragon, the unicorn shakes Tabor from her back midair and plunges into the dragon's heart, killing both herself and the dragon. Tabor is saved from his death plunge by magical intervention.

Despite this unexpected victory, the battle is not going well for the Light as Darien arrives in Starkadh. He faces his father in a room at the top of a tower whose windows magically reflect the battle going on miles away. Maugrim tries to batter his way into Darien's mind, and when he fails guesses who Darien is. Realizing that a child of his getting binds him into the Loom and thus makes him mortal, he gloats that now he will kill Darien himself and thus restore his immortality. He takes Lökdal from Darien; Darien, seeing the horror and death on the battlefield, at last makes his choice for the Light. When he does so, Lisen's Circlet blazes up, temporarily blinding Maugrim; in that moment Darien steps forward onto the knife, and so Maugrim kills without love in his heart and the curse of Lökdal destroys him.

The tide of battle turns and Maugrim's army scatters, but Galadan, who since Lisen's death a thousand years ago has wanted nothing more than the annihilation of everything, blows Owein's Horn to summon the Wild Hunt. They arrive, but before they can begin to destroy everything in Fionavar Leila, far away in Paras Derval but still linked to Finn, slams the double-headed axe down on the altar and demands in the name of the Goddess that he come home. When Finn tries to turn his horse, Iselin throws him and he falls to his death. Ruana of the Paraiko arrives and, telling Owien that since they have once again lost the Child who leads them they must be returned to their slumber, binds them once again as Connla did so long ago—though he comforts them by saying that one day they will be free again.

Paul, recognizing that Galadan's ability to hear the Horn means that he is not altogether evil, leaves him free to go, and Cernan takes him away to find healing. Paul then calls the sea in to wash the plain clean; with the sea comes a boat, and Jennifer/Guinevere, Lancelot and Arthur (who has survived to see the end) are also freed from their penance and sail away together at last. Paul decides to stay in Fionavar with Jaelle, who has stepped aside as High Priestess in favor of Leila. Ceinwen, the Goddess of the Hunt, appears one last time to Dave and reminds him that he cannot remain in Fionavar, but as a final gift she asks him what he would name a child of the andain, a son, if he had one. He chooses the name "Kevin" and he and Kim return to our world.

== Reception ==
Dave Langford reviewed The Darkest Road for White Dwarf #94, and stated that "Kay has done well with shopworn materials; I have a sneaking hope that now he's got Tolkien out of his system, he'll write something better."

== Reviews ==
- Review by Faren Miller (1986) in Locus, #308 September 1986
- Review by Charles de Lint (1986) in Fantasy Review, December 1986
- Review by Mary Gentle (1987) in Vector 141
- Review by Helen McNabb (1987) in Vector 141
- Review by Phyllis McDonald (1987) in Interzone, #22 Winter 1987
- Review by David Pringle (1988) in Modern Fantasy: The Hundred Best Novels
- Review by Jessica Yates (1989) in Paperback Inferno, #80
- Review [German] by Harald Junker and Gerd Rottenecker (1990) in Der Golem: Jahrbuch zur phantastischen Literatur 1989
- Review by Roslyn Goss (1992) in SF Commentary, #71/72
