= Tigana =

1990 novel by Guy Gavriel Kay

- First edition cover
- Author: Guy Gavriel Kay
- Cover artist: Mel Odom
- Language: English
- Genre: Fantasy
- Publisher: Penguin Canada
- Publication date: August 1990
- Publication place: Canada
- Media type: Print
- Pages: 673 pp.
- ISBN: 0-451-45028-0
- OCLC: 21332269

Tigana is a 1990 fantasy novel by Canadian writer Guy Gavriel Kay. The novel is set in a region called the Peninsula of the Palm, which somewhat resembles Renaissance Italy as well as the Peloponnese in shape.

== Setting ==
The world where Tigana takes place is a planet orbited by two moons. Kay notes that some of his readers tried to connect Tigana with A Song for Arbonne by speculating the stories take place on the same fictional world; Kay explained that he only repeated the same idea rather than attempting to expand his canon.

Action is centered on the Peninsula of the Palm, which shares a common culture and language, but, like medieval Italy, is not a unified nation, comprising instead nine provinces with a long history of internecine struggle. The provinces are: Asoli, Astibar, Certando, Chiara, Corte, Ferraut, Senzio, Tigana, and Tregea. Kay alludes to the fact that all this takes place in the Southern Hemisphere of the unnamed world.

This internal conflict facilitates the conquest of the region by two powerful sorcerers: Brandin, the King of Ygrath, and Alberico, an independent warlord from the empire of Barbadior. The two sorcerers conquered simultaneously but independently the peninsula, and have divided it in an uneasy balance of power.

In an interview, Kay noted that the title of the book inadvertently coincided with the football player Jean Tigana. Because of this, the Italian translation of the novel used the title Tigane instead.

=== Mythology ===
The religion of the Palm is centered on a triad of deities, a God and two Goddesses; the one being his sister-wife and the other being their daughter. An annual feast celebrates the torment and deicide of the God by his sister-wife and daughter, their eating of his flesh, and his rebirth.

=== Riselka ===
The "riselka" is the only supernatural creature of the book. Based on the rusalka of Slavic folklore and mythology, its appearance in Kay's world is a token of some portent. A portion of it reads as follows:

One man sees a riselka: his life forks there.
Two men see a riselka: one of them shall die.
Three men see a riselka: one is blessed, one forks, one shall die.
One woman sees a riselka: her path comes clear to her.
Two women see a riselka: one of them shall bear a child.
Three women see a riselka: one is blessed, one is clear, one shall bear a child.

== Plot ==
A group of rebels attempting to overthrow both tyrants and win back their homeland. Many of the rebels are natives of the province of Tigana, which was the province that most ably resisted Brandin; in a crucial battle, Brandin's son was killed. In retaliation for this, Brandin attacked Tigana and crushed it more savagely than any other part of the Palm; then he used his magic to remove the name and history of Tigana from the minds of the population. Brandin named it Lower Corte, making Corte, their traditional enemies to their north, seem superior to a land that was all but forgotten.

Only those born in Tigana before the invasion can hear or speak its name or remember it as it was. Everyone else in this book sees Tigana as an insignificant part of a neighbouring province, hence the rebels are battling for the very soul of their country.

In the end the rebels engineer a battle between their two enemies hoping they will defeat each other. After victory, the magic preventing others from remembering the province of Tigana is removed.

== Awards ==
Tigana was nominated for the 1991 World Fantasy Award—Novel and Aurora Award for Best Novel, winning the latter.
