= Gene Marshall =

Fashion doll brand

Gene Marshall doll from the 2008 collection

Gene Marshall is a 15.5 inch tall collectible fashion doll inspired by Hollywood's Golden Age. It was created by the illustrator Mel Odom. Each doll features an intricate movie-styled theme based upon fashions from the 1930s, 1940s and 1950s as well as Hollywood's version of historical costuming.

When the Gene Marshall doll appeared on the market in 1995, it was one of the first large fashion dolls primarily intended for adult collectors. Its success sparked the creation of similar dolls from other companies.

== History ==
When the Gene Marshall doll appeared on the market in 1995, it was one of the first items of its type and size: a 15.5-inch fashion doll primarily intended for display by adult collectors. Until then, the standard fashion doll had been the 11.5-inch Barbie, which is still primarily sold as a children's plaything; while some collectors were attracted to limited-edition specialty Barbies, most collectible dolls at the time were constructed with neotenous baby-doll proportions instead of with mature, nubile ones. There was an exception; Mdvanii, the first anatomically correct fashion doll for adults. Mdvanii renewed Mel Odom's childhood interest in dolls and led him to create Gene Marshall. The popular success of Gene Marshall sparked the invention of an entire genre of similar collectible large fashion dolls from other companies, such as Tyler Wentworth from Tonner Doll Company, Alexandra Fairchild Ford from Madame Alexander and Clea Bella from Bella! Productions.

Three years after Gene Marshall's introduction, over half a million had been sold, and a Gene subculture had sprung up including collectibles clubs, magazines, and conventions. Her design is "an amalgam of all the larger-than-life actresses of Hollywood's Golden Era", and costumes that evoke the work of Edith Head are supposed to represent her appearances in specific but fictional films.

Odom's illustration work has been compared to dolls, and though his career progressed beyond the men's magazines for which he is still best known (he has done book and magazine covers including Time magazine), he believes that Gene is the "something significant" he has felt bound to do after watching 2/3 of his friends die during the AIDS epidemic. After its debut at the 1995 toy fair, Gene became a hit among adult collectors, among them actress Demi Moore ("the world's most high-profile doll collector", according to The New York Times).

== Backstory ==
The doll comes with a detailed backstory, eventually expressed in the novelization Gene Marshall, Girl Star. The character Gene Marshall was born in Cos Cob, Connecticut, in 1923, and was discovered by the filmmaker Eric von Sternberg while working in New York City as an usherette. Cast in his next film, she was thrust into a major role when the star fell through a trapdoor during a musical number called "You Floor Me". By the 1950s she was a Hollywood "powerhouse".
