= Under heaven =

Under heaven may refer to:

- Tianxia, ancient Chinese cultural concept that denoted the entire world
- Under Heaven (novel), novel by Guy Gavriel Kay
- Under Heaven (film), 1998 film
