= BillyBoy* =

American fashion designer

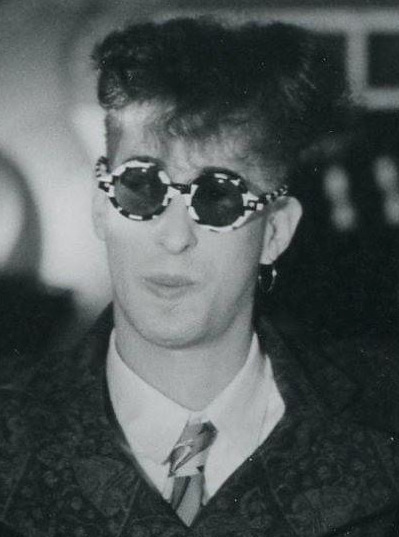
- BillyBoy* in Munich, 1988
- Born: 10 March 1960 (age 66); Vienna, Austria
- Citizenship: Switzerland
- Occupations: Artist, costume jewellery and fashion design
- Years active: c.1974—present
- Organization(s): Surreal Couture, Mdvanii, Surreal Bijoux, Foundation Tanagra
- Notable work: Barbie: Her Life and Times
- Spouse(s): Jean Pierre Lestrade ("Lala", 2012–)

BillyBoy* (born 10 March 1960), also written as Billy Boy, is an American artist, socialite, and fashion designer. By the 1980s, BillyBoy* had become closely associated with Barbie, following a brief but prolific collaboration with Mattel that resulted in two Barbie dolls. A devoted collector, he amassed an extensive Barbie collection and developed a friendship with pop artist Andy Warhol, who used one of his dolls as the basis for the painting Barbie, Portrait of BillyBoy* (1986).

== Life and career ==
Born in Vienna, he was adopted by a Russian couple who moved to New York City when he was four.

In 1979 BillyBoy* began to design and manufacture costume jewellery under the label Surreal Bijoux in Paris.

A bracelet made by BillyBoy* and owned by Elizabeth Taylor was sold at auction in 2011 for $6,875.

BillyBoy* had a collection of over 11,000 Barbie dolls and 3,000 Ken dolls, and in 1987 authored the book Barbie: Her Life and Times. During 1984–1990 Mattel sponsored two tours called Le nouveau théâtre de la mode (New Theatre of Fashion) curated by BillyBoy*. Like the original 1945 exhibit Théâtre de la Mode, the exhibitions consisted of hundreds of dolls—in this case Barbie dolls—wearing miniature outfits made by Yves Saint Laurent and other prominent fashion designers. The exhibition toured France on board a TGV-train entitled Le Train magique des jouets Mattel.. BillyBoy* designed two Barbie dolls for Mattel working as a designer and consultant, "Le Nouveau Théâtre de la mode" in 1984 and "Feelin' Groovy" in 1986. After finishing working with Mattel, BillyBoy* formed the "BillyBoy* Toys" company, and in 1989 BillyBoy* and his partner released the Mdvanii fashion doll.

Pop artist Andy Warhol's painting Barbie, Portrait of BillyBoy* was a painting of BillyBoy* depicted as a Barbie doll and was presented to BillyBoy* in New York on 10 February 1986. The painting was gifted to BillyBoy* and hung in his living room. In 2014 the painting sold at the auction house Christie's for £722,500 ($1,161,780). A second version of Warhol's painting, this time with an orange-red background instead of blue, was created for and purchased by Mattel.

In 1978 or 1979 BillyBoy* moved to Paris, where later his shop would be at 6 Rue de la Paix, Paris. In 1993 BillyBoy* and his partner Jean Pierre Lestrade ("Lala") moved to Trouville-sur-Mer in France, then in 1997 to Switzerland, and finally in 2011 to Delémont, the capital of the Canton of Jura and near Basel. On 6 February 2012 BillyBoy* and Jean Pierre Lestrade married at the L’Hôtel de Ville in Délémont.

On 13 February 1998 BillyBoy* and Lestrade founded the Fondation Tanagra non-profit in Yverdon-les-Bains, Switzerland. In 2012 the website of the Foundation was updated to reflect the creation of a future museum in Delémont.

== Works ==
- BillyBoy* (1988). Barbie: Her Life and Times. Outlet Book Company. ISBN 0517671751.
- BillyBoy* (1993). Bleuette: La Petite Fille Modele (Collection Billyboy) (in French). Maeght Editeur. ISBN 2869412045.
- BillyBoy*; Lestrade, Jean-Pierre (10 August 2007). Ewing, William (ed.). Mdvanii; ceci n'est pas une poupée (in French). Infolio. ISBN 978-2884740173.
- BillyBoy*; Druesedow, Jean (17 March 2015). Frocking Life: Searching for Elsa Schiaparelli (Biography of Elsa Schiaparelli). Rizzoli International. pp. 1–472. ISBN 9780847843862.
