= River of Stars =

2013 fantasy novel by Guy Gavriel Kay

- Hardcover edition
- Author: Guy Gavriel Kay
- Language: English
- Genre: Historical fantasy
- Publisher: Roc Books
- Publication date: April 2013
- Publication place: Canada
- Media type: Print (hardcover)
- Pages: 656
- ISBN: 978-0451464972
- Preceded by: Under Heaven

River of Stars, a historical fantasy, is the twelfth novel by Canadian fantasy author Guy Gavriel Kay. It was published in April 2013 by Roc Hardcover. It is Kay's second work set in an alternate history of China, taking place 400 years after his previous novel, Under Heaven. The novel is a fictionalized account of the Disaster of Jingkang and the beginning of the Jin–Song Wars during the Song dynasty.

== Plot ==
The novel is set in the empire of Kitai, an analogue of twelfth-century Song dynasty China, around five hundred years following the events of Under Heaven. Kitai has vast wealth and a rich civic culture centered on ci lyrical poetry, but the empire's military, intentionally weakened by the imperial civil service following the events of Under Heaven, has proven unable to resist incursions by tribes of the northern steppe., Kitai's borders have receded south of the long-abandoned Long Wall, and the empire has established an uneasy peace with the Xiaolu Empire on the steppe, which, despite its military superiority, has grown economically dependent on Kitai.

The events of the novel closely parallel the historical Disaster of Jingkang and the defeat of the Kaifeng-based Song dynasty by the invading Jin dynasty. The novel follows two protagonists: Ren Daiyan, a self-taught archer and swordsman whose fortuitous encounters with an up-and-coming magistrate lead him to become first an outlaw of the marsh and then a military officer, and Lin Shan, a talented ci poet given a man's education by her father. After an encounter with the exiled poet Lu Chen thrusts her into the world of court intrigue in the imperial capital of Hanjin, Lin is introduced to Emperor Wenzong and eventually becomes a favored courtier. Ren and Lin intersect and become lovers amid various intrigues in the capital. They find themselves aligned with Hang Dejin, the emperor's aging prime minister, against Hang's deputy and eventual successor, Kai Zhen, who has risen to power by building the emperor a massive pleasure garden. The expansion of the garden requires a system of oppressive taxes and requisitions, leading to banditry and unrest in rural Kitai.

Amid the unrest, the imperial court commits itself to a policy of military adventurism in the north, encouraging the restive Altai tribe to rebel against the Xiaolu. This strategy fails disastrously, and after easily conquering the Xiaolu, the Altai mount a scorched-earth invasion of Kitai, violently sacking Hanjin and capturing most of the imperial family. Ren, the only Kitan general capable of defeating Altai forces in the field, rescues Shan and an imperial heir, Prince Zhizheng, and conducts a fighting retreat to the south. Ren reorganizes the Kitai military and rapidly reconquers territory in the north. He quickly becomes a folk hero but is viewed with suspicion by his superiors, and is imprisoned on trumped-up treason charges when Zhizheng, to guard against his family's restoration in the north, proclaims himself emperor of a rump Kitan state and negotiates an unfavorable peace with the Altai. Lin, meanwhile, settles in the south on the estate of her old acquaintance Lu Chen.

The novel concludes ambiguously, with Hang Hsien, Zhizheng's prime minister and the son of Hang Dejin, offering Ren a choice between suicide and a life in obscurity following a faked death.

== Major characters ==
- Ren Daiyan: a military commander and onetime bandit, born the second son of a village clerk in western Kitai.
- Lin Shan: a renowned ci poet educated as a man, who marries into a distant branch of the imperial family and becomes a favored courtier.
- Lu Chen: the foremost ci poet of his day, once a prominent member of the imperial court's conservative faction but exiled following the ascent of Hang Dejin.
- Lu Chao: Lu Chen's brother and a diplomat sent to explore a Kitai-Altai alliance against the Xiaolu.
- Zhao Ziji: Ren's trusted companion-in-arms and second-in-command, once a junior army officer ambushed by a youthful Ren's bandit gang.
- Hang Dejin: the prime minister of Kitai, leader of the court's reformist faction, and onetime tutor of Emperor Wenzong.
- Wan'yen: the war-leader and de facto ruler of the Altai.
- Wang Fuyin: a respected magistrate of Kitai, once a prefectural official whose life was saved by a young Ren Daiyan, and frequently Ren's benefactor.
- Lin Kuo: Lin Shan's father, a gentleman-scholar who passed the imperial civil service examinations on his second attempt, but who has never held office.
- Qi Wai: Lin Shan's husband in a companionate marriage; an impassioned collector of historical artefacts and a member of the imperial clan.
- Wenzong: the Emperor of Kitai.
- Kai Zhen: the deputy prime minister of Kitai and Hang Dejin's rival, eventually the prime minister himself.
- Tuan Lung: Ren Daiyan's teacher as a youth, who instilled in him an understanding of Kitan history and culture, and later an itinerant healer and sometime-charlatan.
- Hang Hsien: Hang Dejin's son and assistant, and eventually the prime minister to Emperor Zhizheng.
- Bai'ji: Wan-yan's brother.
- Xi Wengao: Hang Dejin's predecessor as prime minister, leader of the court's conservative faction, and a renowned poet who hosts Lin Shan, her father, and Lu Chen early in the novel.

== Reception ==
Critical reception has been mostly positive. The Washington Post rated the book favorably, writing that it was "a major accomplishment, the work of a master novelist in full command of his subject". The A.V. Club gave a mostly favorable review, stating "The novel as a whole may not always succeed, but when it does, it’s astounding."

== Awards ==
River of Stars won the 2014 Copper Cylinder Award in the adult novel category.
