= Under Heaven (novel) =

2010 fantasy novel by Guy Gavriel Kay

- Author: Guy Gavriel Kay
- Cover artist: Larry Rostant
- Language: English
- Genre: Historical fantasy
- Publisher: Penguin Group
- Publication date: April 2010
- Publication place: Canada
- Media type: Print (Hardback)
- Pages: 567
- ISBN: 978-0-670-06809-8
- Preceded by: Ysabel
- Followed by: River of Stars

Under Heaven is a historical fantasy novel by Canadian author Guy Gavriel Kay. Kay's eleventh novel, it was published in April 2010 by Viking Canada. The work, set in a secondary world based upon Tang China, is a departure for Kay in that it takes place outside of a setting based on Europe or the Mediterranean. It recounts events based on the An Shi Rebellion. Under Heaven takes place in a completely new world, as seen by it having only one moon as opposed to the two moons normally present in Guy Gavriel Kay's works. In 2013 he published a second novel, River of Stars, set approximately 400 years later in the same world.

== Overview ==
Shen Tai, the second son of a renowned general of Kitai, is given a lavish gift of 250 prized Sardian horses from the Kitan Empress of the neighbouring Taguran Empire to honour his work burying the dead of both sides at a battleground in the far west of Kitai still haunted by the ghosts of the slain soldiers. This extraordinary gift threatens to engulf Shen Tai in the political and dynastic struggles that surround the throne of the Kitan Emperor, but also permits Shen Tai to form friendships and gain access to the most powerful figures in Kitai. Narrowly escaping an assassination attempt with the assistance of the ghosts of the unburied, Shen Tai leaves the battleground on the western frontier to journey toward the capital, Xinan, protected by Wei Song, a female Kanlin warrior. Another line of narrative follows Shen Tai's sister Li-Mei who is sent north to be married off to a leader of the northern Bogü for the purposes of advancing the career interests of Shen Liu, their older brother. Shen Tai must determine a way forward for himself, which involves making choices between personal, family and imperial needs, choices which become all the more perilous when Kitai is convulsed by a military rebellion that threatens the ruling dynasty. The story weaves themes of loss, chance, honour and friendship in a world still haunted by magic.

== Detailed summary ==
"I want to keep readers turning pages until two in the morning or better (or worse!). So consider this: if I base a book on a slightly altered past the reader who knows what happened in that time and place does not know with any certainty what will happen in my story. In Under Heaven I've served notice with the shift to an imagined Kitai from real China that I reserve the right to change, or telescope events."

— Under Heaven's Author's letter by Guy Gavriel Kay at Brightweavings, Kay's authorized website

The story takes place in a fictionalized China that corresponds approximately to the Tang era. The Empire of Kitai (China) has enjoyed a period of prosperity and peace under its now aging emperor Taizu in his capital at Xinan. Peace has been made with the Taguran Empire (Tibet) to the west, and with the Bogü (Turkic or Mongolian) peoples of the northwest. At the opening of Under Heaven Shen Tai, second of four children from a well-known family in central Kitai, has gone to the battle site of Kuala Nor near the western frontier of Kitai following his father's death to commence the task of burying the bones of the dead Kitan and Taguran soldiers killed twenty years earlier. At Kuala Nor Shen Tai is haunted by the ghosts of the dead whose cries can be heard at night. Word of his efforts spreads east to Xinan and west into the Taguran Empire, whose empress, a former Kitan princess, prevails upon the Taguran emperor to make Tai a gift of 250 prized Sardian horses (Ferghana horse). Shortly after receiving word of this gift, a friend, Chou Yan, arrives with news of Tai's sister, but the Kanlin warrior accompanying Yan is actually an assassin. She kills Yan before he can tell Tai his news, but Tai is saved by the ghosts and by the return of the Tagurans.

Knowing that he has already been the target of assassination, and fearing that word of the extraordinary gift of the Sardian horses will only make his death more attractive, Shen devises a strategy designed to keep himself alive in order to deliver the valuable Sardian horses to the Empire with the assistance of Bytsan sri Nespo, a Taguran officer with whom Shen develops a lifelong friendship. Returning to the Kitai with a single Sardian horse, he finds a Kanlin warrior, Wei Song, in pursuit of the first, false Kanlin. She has been sent by Shen's former lover Spring Rain, a courtesan who has now become the favoured concubine of Wen Zhou, the new prime minister of Kitai, and is able to save his life against further assassination attempts.

Xu Bihai, the military governor in the western city of Chenyao, who covets the Sardian horses, unsuccessfully attempts to gain control of Shen through his attractive daughter. At Chenyao Shen is befriended by Sima Zian, a famous poet some twenty years Shen's senior, who accompanies Shen to Xinan and emerges as one of the few people that Shen can trust unreservedly. He also informs Shen that his sister, Li-Mei, has been named a princess sent north to the Bogü as a bride for the son of the Bogü leader. Before reaching the capital, Shen is approached by the most powerful figures in Kitai, each trying to assess their prospects for acquiring control of the famed Sardian horses. These include Wen Jian, the Precious Consort, a dazzling young woman of good family with whom the elderly Emperor Taizu has become infatuated, and An Li, known as 'Roshan', the military governor of barbarian origins who has become an increasingly powerful figure, commanding the forces of three military districts in the northeast. Shen Tai continues toward Xinan, and as he approaches the great metropolis he is swept into palace intrigue. At Xinan there is a brief reunion with Spring Rain.

A parallel plotline to the story of Shen Tai follows his sister Shen Li-Mei's forced exile beyond the Long Wall to serve the empire by becoming the bride of the khagan or leader of the Bogü ruling clan. This idea was supported by the eldest Shen brother, Shen Liu, chief advisor to Prime Minister Wen Zhou, as a way of advancing his own interests at the court. In his early military career, before the novel's opening, when Shen Tai had been on a previous military expedition beyond the Long Wall that protects the northern borders of Kitai, he had interrupted a magic rite being performed on Meshag, a kinsman of the Bogü ruler, that would have transformed him into a wolf spirit, but that had progressed far enough to create a link between Meshag and a wolf. Grateful to Shen Tai for having interrupted the shamanistic ritual, Meshag intervenes to separate Shen Li-Mei from her escort and with the assistance of a number of wolves, including the wolf with which Meshag has been linked. Meshag then undertakes an epic journey across the northern steppes to return Shen Li-Mei to Kitai. Li-Mei, who has known only a sheltered life of privilege, is forced to endure hardships and to learn to trust Meshag who is not only a barbarian, but who has intimidating links with the wolves that accompany them.

Shortly after Shen Tai's arrival in Xinan the powerful An Li ('Roshan') rebels against Taizu's imperial authority. The arrogant Wen Zhou orders the execution of An Li's son, and then gives an order to the military commander Xu Bihai that results in a disastrous defeat for Kitai's forces, the forced abandonment of Xinan and the slaughter of thousands of its inhabitants, including many members of the imperial family. The upheavals set in motion by An Li's rebellion are reported to result in the deaths of up to forty million Kitans from war, disease and famine. Shen Tai manages to warn Spring Rain of the coming disaster in time to permit her to flee Xinan before it is taken by An Li, a bitter enemy of Wen Zhou, but Shen Tai and Spring Rain are not destined to meet again.

News of Xu Bihai's defeat sparks a rebellion at an outpost where Emperor Taizu, his heir Shinzu, Wen Zhou the prime minister and Wen Jian the Precious Consort have stopped for the night. This revolt, by a mere handful of men, results in the violent deaths of Wen Zhou, Wen Jian, and Shen Liu, and the abdication of Taizu in favor of Shinzu. Shen Tai travels southwest to claim the Sardian horses, but elects to return to his home rather than to take the horses himself to the embattled Emperor Shinzu, after acknowledging his feelings for and commencing a relationship with Wei Song. Reaching his home, Shen Tai is reunited with his family, including Shen Li-Mei who has made her way home, and arrangements are made for the marriage of Shen Tai and Wei Song.

== Characters ==
- Shen Tai is the second son of Shen Gao, a famed general in the Kitai military, through whom a major part of the narrative is experienced. His past includes periods spent as a soldier, a Kanlin acolyte and a scholar in Xinan. In Xinan, he became very attached to a courtesan, Spring Rain. Following the death of his father two years before the opening of the novel, Shen Tai retired to Kuala Nor, site of a battleground twenty years earlier, to begin the task of burying the bones of the deceased warriors. In leaving Xinan, he was obliged to leave behind Spring Rain.
- Shen Li-Mei is the younger sister of Shen Tai, and daughter of General Shen Gao. Assigned to the Empress initially, Li-Mei is then made a princess and betrothed to a Bogü leader and sent north beyond the borders of Kitai. Li-Mei's journey outward, rescue and return to Kitai have a profound effect on her character development, and a significant portion of the narrative follows Li-Mei's viewpoint.
- Spring Rain was born in Sardia, a land far to the west of Kitai. A courtesan from the North District of Xinan, she is the beloved of Shen Tai, but he is obliged to leave her upon the death of his father, and she is acquired as concubine by Wen Zhou. When she discovers Wen Zhou's plot to kill Shen Tai, she dispatches Wei Song to protect Tai. Compassionate as well as beautiful, Spring Rain inspires loyal devotion among some of her household staff and a crippled beggar that allows her to escape the occupation of Xinan by General An Li.
- Wen Zhou is the prime minister of Kitai (historical Yang Guozhong), and is aligned against General An Li in a struggle for power around the throne. His appointment as Prime Minister was facilitated by the fact that he is the cousin of Wen Jian, the emperor's new favourite concubine. He buys Spring Rain from the North District brothel where she works and establishes her in his household as favoured concubine, and then moves against Shen Tai, a rival for her affections.
- Shen Liu is the eldest of the Shen siblings. An intellectually brilliant and subtle mandarin, he has become principal advisor to Wen Zhou, and was behind the plan to exile his sister Li-Mei as a bride to the Bogü to enhance his status.
- Taizu is the aging emperor of Kitai (historical Emperor Xuanzong of Tang). At the beginning of the story the reader learns that he has become completely enamoured of his new concubine Wen Jian, and has begun receiving alchemical treatments to enhance his vigour and prolong his life.
- Wen Jian the Precious Consort (historical Yang Guifei, one of the Four Beauties of Chinese history) is the favoured concubine of Emperor Taizu, originally intended as a bride for Prince Shinzu. Beautiful, seductive and manipulative, Wen Jian becomes adoptive mother to the powerful General An Li and makes suggestive overtures to Shen Tai.
- Wei Song, a Kanlin warrior, is sent by Spring Rain to prevent the first assassination attempt ordered by Wen Zhou. Thereafter she accompanies Shen Tai on his journey toward Xinan, and then south to collect the gift of the Sardian horses.
- Sima Zian, known as "the Banished Immortal", is a poet of renown some twenty years older than Shen Tai (historical poet Li Bai). Tai is a great admirer of Sima Zian's poetry and the two become staunch friends and drinking companions as Tai makes his way toward the capital.
- An Li, known also as "Roshan" (historical general An Lushan), is an aging general in command of the forces of three military districts. Disdained by many at court because of his non-Kitan origins, being a "barbarian" from beyond the Long Wall, his illiteracy and his huge size, he is drawn as a character of insight and intelligence, justly feared for his cunning and ambitions. Ultimately, he unleashes a brutal rebellion against the emperor which results in the collapse of control and order in large parts of the empire.
- Meshag is the eldest son of Hurok, the Bogü khagan or leader. A capable leader, Meshag is struck down by a shamanic spell several years before the novel starts, leaving him in a coma-like state near death. Another shaman attempts to perform another ritual on Meshag, but this is interrupted by Shen Tai, leaving Meshag in a partially transformed state between human and non-human, but nevertheless grateful to Shen Tai for having saved him from the dark magic.

== Reception ==
Under Heaven was given a favorable review by Toronto's The Globe and Mail. Here, reviewer Robert Wiersema described it as: "a sumptuous feast of storytelling, a beautifully written tale with a beating, breaking heart at its core that will have readers in tears by its final pages". Michael Dirda, in his review for The Washington Post, Beware Gift Horses, noted that Kay has leavened the story with "appealing minor characters" that enhance the richness of the plot.
