= The Wandering Fire =

1986 novel by Guy Gavriel Kay

- First edition
- Author: Guy Gavriel Kay
- Cover artist: Martin Springett
- Language: English
- Series: The Fionavar Tapestry
- Genre: Fantasy novel
- Publisher: Arbor House
- Publication date: 1986
- Publication place: Canada
- Media type: Print (Hardback & Paperback)
- Pages: 448 pp
- ISBN: 0-451-45833-8
- OCLC: 45330188
- Dewey Decimal: 813/.54 21
- LC Class: PR9199.3.K39 D3 2001
- Preceded by: The Summer Tree
- Followed by: The Darkest Road

The Wandering Fire is a 1986 novel by Canadian fantasy author Guy Gavriel Kay and the second novel of The Fionavar Tapestry trilogy. It follows The Summer Tree.

== Plot summary ==
Six months have passed since the end of The Summer Tree, and Kim is waiting for the dream that will tell her how to summon the Warrior to aid them in their battle against Maugrim. Jennifer is pregnant with Rakoth Maugrim's child and, surprisingly, is determined to have the baby—aware that Maugrim wanted her dead, she is determined not only to live but to have the child, believing that it will be both an answer and a threat to him. She and Paul are menaced in their own world by Galadan; Paul, tapping the potent but unreliable power of Mörnir that lives in him since his three nights on the Summer Tree, takes the two of them back to Fionavar. They arrive safely but the crossing brings on Jennifer's labor. When the child is born she names him Darien and gives him to Vae and Shahar, the parents of Finn. Jaelle sends Paul and Jennifer back to their own world.

In the spring, Kim and the others go to Stonehenge, where a dream has revealed to Kim she can call on Uther Pendragon to find out where Arthur is buried. She succeeds in raising Uther and extracting from him the name by which Arthur may be summoned. Using the Baelrath, she sends the others to Fionavar and herself to Glastonbury Tor, where she summons Arthur with the name Childslayer. Arthur is bound to answer to this name because of the May Babies, children he had ordered slain in an attempt to forestall Mordred's growing to manhood.

Kim and Arthur rejoin the others in Fionavar. This time, Fionavar is in the midst of an unnatural months-long winter. Upon meeting Arthur, a flood of memories awakens in Jennifer and she recalls her life as Guinevere. Unable to break through the walls she created to survive her ordeal in Starkadh, Jennifer retreats to the temple of Dana, relieved that at least there is no Lancelot and so although she cannot love Arthur, at least she won't betray him. Meanwhile, Darien is growing up unnaturally quickly, like all andain, so Vae, Shahar and Finn move to Ysanne's cottage by the lake. Darien is a loving little boy and devoted to Finn—but he also hears voices in the storm and sometimes unknowingly flexes the power he inherited from his father, which makes his eyes turn red.

On the Plains, the eltor are bogged down in the snow and harried by Galadan's wolves. The Dalrei do their best to protect the herds but come under attack by an army of urgach mounted on slaug. Diarmuid and his men, with Dave and Kevin, arrive in time to thwart the initial assault, but it is Tabor, mounted on Imraith-Nimphais, who finally saves them. Ivor worries that his son's bond with the deadly but beautiful magical beast will weaken Tabor's hold on the real world.

Kim, Dave, Levon and a small band make their way to the Cave of the Sleepers and Dave blows Owein's Horn to wake the Wild Hunt. Owein and seven shadowy kings awaken, but there are nine horses. Just as the Hunt is about to rampage forth looking for their missing member, Finn arrives and takes his place on the ninth horse: this is his Longest Road, riding with the Wild Hunt.

The entire company (except for Paul who remains with Darien) journeys to Gwen Ystrat, a location sacred to the goddess, arriving (by chance?) on Midsummer Eve, or Maidaladan, a night of potent sexual/erotic magic. Kim, Gereint, Jaelle and the mages discover that Metran, renegade first mage of Brennin, is making the winter on an island; since all the ports are frozen, they cannot get to him to stop him. Kevin is wounded during a boar hunt which he realizes marks him as belonging to the Goddess. That night, Midsummer Eve, Diarmuid and Sharra admit their love for each other; meanwhile, Kevin follows Cavall to the cave of Dun Maura where he sacrifices his life to the Goddess, allowing her to intercede and, with the magic unleashed from his sacrifice, end the winter that has been looming over Fionavar.

Freed from winter, war begins. Kim and Brock journey to the mountains where they are attacked by brigands. The Dalrei are attacked by a vast army of the Dark, and only Dave's summoning of the Wild Hunt by blowing Owein's Horn turns the tide. However, the Hunt are as wild as their name, and when they finish slaughtering the armies of the Dark they turn on the Dalrei and the other armies of the Light. Ceinwen intervenes, and that night she takes Dave as her lover.

Meanwhile Darien has used his powers to accelerate his growth and, now a young man, overhears Cernan ask Paul why "the child" was allowed to live. Angry, hurt by Finn's desertion, feeling unwanted and unloved, Darien decides to seek his father, Maugrim. Jennifer comes to terms with her past and has one day of joyous reunion with Arthur, both of them daring to hope that this time things will be different since there is "no third" (i.e. no Lancelot). Arthur, Loren, Matt, Paul and Diarmuid set sail for Cader Sedat, and Jennifer goes to Lisen's tower with Brendel to await their return.

The ship, Prydwen, reaches Cader Sedat and the company discovers that Metran is fueling his unnatural winter by draining the life from hundreds of svart alfar, resurrecting them again and again using the Cauldron of Khath Meigol. Loren breaks the spell and kills Metran but in the process draws so much power that Matt dies. Below the castle, the company finds the Chamber of the Dead and Arthur, shouldering the full weight of his repeated penance, awakens Lancelot du Lac. Lancelot exercises his gift of healing and brings Matt back to life, though death has broken the binding between Matt and Loren and so Loren is no longer a mage. The company prepares to depart; Lancelot is reluctant to accompany them, knowing that his mere presence will cause yet more pain to Arthur and Guinevere, both of whom he loves so deeply. "Then Arthur spoke, and there was sorrow in his voice and there was love. 'Oh, Lance, come," he said. "She will be waiting for you.' " (WF, p. 244). And so the company, including Lancelot, prepares to depart for home.

== Reception ==
Dave Langford reviewed The Wandering Fire for White Dwarf #86, and stated that "What Kay has done is to swipe characters from the finest legend of all, a Tale which is not his, and throw them into the already too-huge cast with promises of Heavy Triangulation next book."

=== Awards ===
- The Wandering Fire won the 1987 Prix Aurora Award in the English category.
- The Wandering Fire won the 1987 Casper Award for best speculative fiction.
