= The Summer Tree =

1984 novel by Guy Gavriel Kay

- First edition
- Author: Guy Gavriel Kay
- Cover artist: Martin Springett
- Language: English
- Series: The Fionavar Tapestry
- Genre: Fantasy novel
- Publisher: McClelland & Stewart
- Publication date: 1984
- Publication place: Canada
- Media type: Print (Hardback & Paperback)
- Pages: 383 pp
- ISBN: 0-7710-4472-0 (first edition); ISBN 0-451-45138-4 (1994 Roc edition)
- OCLC: 12080034
- Dewey Decimal: 813/.54 19
- LC Class: PR9199.3.K39 S9 1984
- Followed by: The Wandering Fire

The Summer Tree is a 1984 novel written by Canadian fantasy author Guy Gavriel Kay and the first novel of The Fionavar Tapestry trilogy.

== Plot summary ==
The book opens in our own world, at the University of Toronto, where the five main characters are all fellow students. They attend a lecture by a Professor Lorenzo Marcus, who afterwards reveals to them that he is in reality Loren Silvercloak, a mage from the land of Fionavar. Silvercloak tells the five that he has come to our world to bring back five guests, as part of the celebration of the 50th year of the reign of High King Ailell of Brennin. After some debate, the students – Kevin Laine, Paul Schafer, Dave Martyniuk, Kimberly Ford, and Jennifer Lowell – agree to accompany Silvercloak and the dwarf Matt Sören (Loren's "source", the person whose strength he draws on to perform his magic). However, Dave has second thoughts in the midst of Loren's transferral process; he attempts to pull free, breaking his contact with the others, and so although the remaining four arrive safely in Brennin, Dave is nowhere to be seen.

Kim, Paul, Jennifer and Kevin discover that Brennin is in the midst of a crippling drought, brought on by the High King's unwillingness to offer himself on the Summer Tree as a sacrifice to Mörnir. The kingdom has been somewhat uneasy since Ailell's eldest son, Aileron, offered to take his father's place; upon Ailell's refusal, he cursed his father and was exiled.

Ysanne the Seer recognizes Kim as the successor foretold by her dreams. Kim accompanies Ysanne to her cottage by the lake where Ysanne calls on Eilathen, a water spirit, to awaken Kim's latent Seer powers; Ysanne then passes to Kim the Baelrath, or Warstone, a red stone set in a ring. Ysanne also shows Kim two magical items. The first is Lökdal, a dwarvish dagger with a double gift: he who kills with Lökdal with love in his heart may make a gift of his soul to another; he who kills without love in his heart will die. Ysanne also shows Kim the Circlet of Lisen, set with a shining white gem, and recounts the prophecy concerning it: "Who shall wear this next after Lisen shall have the darkest road to walk of any child of earth or stars." That night Ysanne takes her own life with Lökdal and makes Kim a gift of her soul. When Kim awakens the next morning, she has not only the power of a seer (which was born in her), but also all of Ysanne's deep knowledge of Fionavar to help her interpret what she sees. Her hair turned completely white, Kim takes Ysanne's place as Seer of Brennin.

Kevin and Paul are befriended by Diarmuid, Ailell's second son, a handsome man and elegant swordsman, but apparently frivolous and light-hearted. They accompany Diarmuid and his band on a daring journey to Cathal, the kingdom to the South of Brennin. Diarmuid has a double purpose: to prove the existence of a way across the Saeral River, and to seduce the King of Cathal's daughter, the lovely but fiercely independent Sharra. He achieves both and the band returns triumphant to Brennin. That night, a song that Kevin sings reawakens Paul's ghosts. Long haunted by grief and guilt over the death of his girlfriend in a car accident which he believes was his fault, Paul offers to sacrifice himself by taking Ailell's place on the Summer Tree, seeing this as a way to expiate his guilt.

Jennifer and Jaelle, High Priestess of Dana, overhear a children's game in which Leila, a young girl, calls a boy named Finn to "take the Longest Road." This is the third time this is happened and clearly marks Finn somehow. Jaelle cannot explain what it means but she sees latent power in Leila and invites her to become an acolyte in the temple. The next day, Jennifer meets Brendel of the lios alfar and some of his people and goes riding with them. That night, Jennifer's escort of lios alfar is slaughtered by Galadan and his wolves, and Jennifer is taken.

Paul is bound naked to the Tree where he hangs for three days and nights, fully expecting that he will die. On the second night, Galadan appears but is driven away by a grey dog. On the third night Dana, the Mother, relieves Paul's pain by showing him that he was not to blame for Rachel's death and Paul is at last able to weep for Rachel. His tears break the drought. Nursed (grudgingly) back to health by Jaelle, Paul recovers and is named Pwyll Twiceborn, Lord of the Summer Tree.

By now it is evident to all concerned that significant events are afoot, and when Mount Rangat explodes in a dramatic hand of fire reaching across the sky, there can be no doubt. Rakoth Maugrim, defeated and chained a thousand years ago, has broken free of his prison—and Jennifer's kidnappers have sent her to him at his fortress of Starkadh.

Ailell suffers a heart attack and dies at the sight. Aileron returns and Diarmuid, with great wit, agrees that he should be High King despite having been exiled. In the midst of this dynastic confusion, Sharra of Cathal, furious at her seduction and abandonment, stabs Diarmuid in the shoulder. Amongst these events we begin to get a hint of the true strength of Diarmuid's character.

Meanwhile, Dave has arrived safely in Fionavar but far out on the plains. He is taken in by a group of Dalrei, or Riders, led by Ivor, chieftain of the third tribe, and Gereint, their shaman. The Dalrei dub him "Davor" and give him an axe, as the weapon best suited to Dave's build and lack of sword training. Dave bonds with Torc dan Sorcha, something of an outcast, when he and Torc spend a night watching over Ivor's son Tabor during his vision quest to find his totem animal. Unbelievably, the animal Tabor sees is a winged chestnut unicorn; even more incredibly, three nights later Tabor finds and immediately bonds with her, knowing that she has been created as a gift of the goddess and her name is Imraith-Nimphais.

When the mountain explodes, Ivor sends a party towards Brennin led by Levon, his oldest son. They are ambushed by svart alfar near Pendaran Wood and only Dave, Levon and Torc survive by fleeing into the wood. The trees of the Wood bear a centuries-long grudge over the death of Lisen, their beautiful forest spirit who bound herself as source to Amairgen, the First Mage, and who killed herself when he died. Flidais rescues them and alerts Ceinwen. Ceinwen takes a fancy to Dave; not only does she transport them safely to the other edge of the wood, she also makes sure that Dave finds Owein's Horn. Levon, well-taught in legends by Gereint, then finds the Cave of the Sleepers, who can be awakened by the Horn.

When all are at last gathered in Brennin, the new High King calls a council. They are interrupted by Brock, a dwarf, who names Matt Sören as rightful King of the Dwarves and then divulges that it is the dwarves who helped Rakoth Maugrim free himself in secret. They have also found for him the Cauldron of Khath Meigol which can resurrect the dead. The council resumes but a sudden blinding headache bursts upon Kim, and in a heartbreaking vision she sees Jennifer in Starkadh, being raped and tortured by Maugrim. Using the power of the Baelrath, Kim manages to pull all five of them out of Fionavar and back into their own world.

== Reviews ==
Dave Langford reviewed The Summer Tree for White Dwarf #72, and stated that "There are outcrops of High Style, balanced by wit, humanity and such unlikely denizens of fantasy as hangovers. [...] Quite a promising start."

Sci-fi and fantasy blog Keeping the Door praised The Summer Tree in its 2009 review as a "delightful little gem of fantasy literature", saying: "Readers who love Ursula K. Le Guin’s deceptively simple style — which surprises due to the complexity of meaning and expression of human emotions beneath the surface — will find much to like in Kay’s prose. Rarely have I read a novel which packs so much character and plot development and world-building into its pages with so little wasted exposition."

== Awards and nominations ==
- Kay was nominated for a Mythopoeic Fantasy Award Literature in 1987 for The Fionavar Tapestry.
