= Guy Gavriel Kay =

Canadian novelist and poet (born 1954)

Guy Gavriel Kay CM
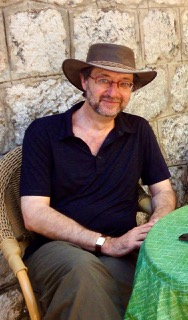
- Kay in 2011
- Born: November 7, 1954 (age 71); Weyburn, Saskatchewan, Canada
- Education: University of Manitoba (BA); University of Toronto (LLB)
- Occupation: Writer
- Writing career
- Period: 1984–present
- Genres: Fantasy; scriptwriting; poetry
- Notable works: The Fionavar Tapestry; Tigana
- Website: brightweavings.com

Guy Gavriel Kay (born November 7, 1954) is a Canadian writer of fantasy fiction. The majority of his novels take place in fictional settings that resemble real places during real historical periods, such as Constantinople during the reign of Justinian I or Spain during the time of El Cid. Kay has expressed a preference to avoid genre categorization of these works as historical fantasy. As of 2025, Kay has published 16 novels and a book of poetry. As of 2018, his fiction has been translated into at least 22 languages. Kay is also a qualified lawyer in Canada.

== Biography ==
Kay was born in Weyburn, Saskatchewan, in 1954. His father, a doctor, was a Jewish immigrant from Poland, and his mother was an artist. He was raised and educated in Winnipeg, Manitoba, and received a bachelor's degree in philosophy from the University of Manitoba in 1975.

When Christopher Tolkien needed an assistant to edit his father J. R. R. Tolkien's unpublished work, he chose Kay, then a student of philosophy at the University of Manitoba, because of a family connection. Kay moved to Oxford in 1974 to assist Christopher in editing The Silmarillion.

Kay returned to Canada in 1975 to pursue a law degree at the University of Toronto, which he obtained in 1978; he was called to the bar of Ontario in 1981. Kay became principal writer and an associate producer for the CBC Radio series The Scales of Justice, and continued as principal writer when the series transferred to television as Scales of Justice.

Kay's first novel, the portal fantasy The Summer Tree, which serves as the first volume of his Fionavar Tapestry trilogy, was published in 1984 by Susan Allison at Penguin Publishing Group. He subsequently had many other novels published, most of them in the field of historical fantasy.

Kay has voiced concerns relative to the decline of individual privacy, the expectation of privacy, and literary privacy. The last principally has to do with the use of real individuals in works of fiction, such as Michael Cunningham's The Hours, partly based on the life of Virginia Woolf, where Woolf features in the novel as a protagonist.

== Bibliography ==
=== Novels ===
Novels marked with an asterisk are set in the same world at various points in its history.

- The Fionavar Tapestry, a portal fantasy in which five travel from the Earth to "the first of all worlds"
  - The Summer Tree (1984)
  - The Wandering Fire (1986), winner of the 1987 Prix Aurora Award
  - The Darkest Road (1986)
- Tigana (1990), taking place in a setting based on Renaissance Italy
- A Song for Arbonne (1992), inspired by the Albigensian Crusade in medieval Provence
- The Lions of Al-Rassan * (1995), set in an analogue of medieval Spain
- The Sarantine Mosaic, * inspired by the Byzantium of Justinian I
  - Sailing to Sarantium (1998)
  - Lord of Emperors (2000)
- The Last Light of the Sun * (2004), inspired by the Viking invasions during the reign of Alfred the Great
- Ysabel (2007), a contemporary fantasy set in Provence, centering on a teenage boy and his encounters with characters from the distant past. Linked to his Fionavar Tapestry series.
- Under Heaven (April 27, 2010), inspired by the 8th-century Tang dynasty and the events leading up to the An Shi Rebellion
- River of Stars (April 2, 2013), taking place in the same setting as Under Heaven, based on the 12th-century Song dynasty and the events around the Jin-Song Wars and the transition from Northern Song to Southern Song
- Children of Earth and Sky * (May 10, 2016), taking place in a world based on Venice, Istanbul and the Balkans in the 15th century
- A Brightness Long Ago * (May 14, 2019), prequel to Children of Earth and Sky inspired by 15th-century Italy during the Italian Wars and particularly the feud between Federico da Montefeltro and Sigismondo Pandolfo Malatesta.
- All the Seas of the World * (May 17, 2022), sequel to A Brightness Long Ago, based upon the wars between Christendom and the Ottoman Empire in the early 16th-century Mediterranean.
- Written on the Dark * (May 25, 2025). Set before Kay's previous three novels, the story is drawn from Hundred Years' War-era France and its conflicts with Henry V of England and Burgundy.

=== Poetry ===
- Beyond This Dark House (2003), a collection

== Awards and distinctions ==
=== Awards ===
- An episode of CBC Radio programme The Scales of Justice written by Kay, entitled "Second Time Around", was awarded the 1985 Scales of Justice Award by the Law Reform Commission of Canada. The purpose of the award was to "accord national recognition to media reports that foster greater public understanding of the inherent values of the Canadian legal and judicial system".
- The Wandering Fire won the 1987 Prix Aurora Award in the English category for best work of speculative fiction.
- Kay won the 1991 Aurora Award for Best Novel for Tigana.
- Kay was runner-up for the White Pine Award in 2007 for Ysabel.
- Ysabel was the winner of the 2008 World Fantasy Award for Best Novel.
- Kay won the International Goliardos Award for his contributions of the international literature of the fantastic.
- Kay was appointed to the Order of Canada in 2014 "for his contributions to the field of speculative fiction as an internationally celebrated author".
- River of Stars won the 2017 Prix Elbakin in France.
- Under Heaven was named the best fantasy novel of the year by the American Library Association. It was the SF Book Club book of the year. It received the Sunburst Award in 2011 and was longlisted for the IMPAC/Dublin Literary prize. It won the 2015 Prix Elbakin, a French award.

=== Nominations ===
- Several nominations for the Mythopoeic Fantasy Award in the category of Adult Literature.
- Four nominations for the World Fantasy Award, won in 2008 for Ysabel.
- Multiple nominations for the Sunburst Award.
