= Mdvanii =

Fashion doll

Mdvanii was originally conceived as a conceptual art and fashion doll for adults (and particularly art, fashion and doll collectors) by artist BillyBoy*. Since 1990, it has been a collaboration with his life partner, artist Jean Pierre Lestrade (a.k.a. Lala). The 25-centimetre (9.8 in) tall doll was originally made in a matte Caron make-up toned hard resin. Mdvanii debuted on February 14, 1989 in London, England.

== Pre-Mdvanii history (1980–1987) ==
Mdvanii was conceived by the artist, collector, social figure, and designer BillyBoy* whose involvement with nostalgic and antique dolls started at a young age. The name was inspired by the sculptor and fashion icon Roussy Mdivani, who appeared to him in a dream. He was a collector of antique French fashion dolls and Kamkins cloth dolls but also Barbie dolls and other vintage post-war fashion dolls since the early 1970s. He started to re-design dolls for his own amusement, re-painting and re-dressing Barbies but also other commercial dolls from the 1960s and 1970s as a teenager. He received press as early as 1978 in notably France and other European countries and the US for his work as an artist and in high fashion which frequently mentioned his passion for dolls. He also at this date had a large collection of fashion dolls, mostly Barbie dolls dressed by major fashion designers from all over the world made for him personally by the designers he befriended or knew. In 1983 he was contacted by Mattel France after an article in French Elle magazine appeared. By early 1984 he created for Mattel the “Nouveau Théatre de la Mode Barbie”, which was the first Barbie doll bearing a designer's name on its box, also well as his follow-up Barbie doll for Mattel, USA, called "Feelin' Groovy Barbie" in 1986. His book titled Barbie, Her Life and Times was published in the US by Crown Publishers, accompanied by a world tour of a selection of his vintage and unique haute couturier dressed Barbie dolls called "BillyBoy* Le Nouveau Théatre de la Mode".

== Launch ==
Mdvanii debuted on Valentine's Day in 1989 after two years of development. The doll was introduced as a fashion doll, but the embodiment of an ultra-sophisticated thinking woman of a post-Feminist genre who, in this case, was bisexual. It was the first anatomically correct fashion doll with an adult (non-parody) storyline including homosexual, lesbian and bisexual personality traits. It was presented with a wardrobe of high fashion clothes made in France with identical construction as human-scale clothes. Mdvanii, referred to as "she" by the artist for which he insisted was also attributed many different intellectual attributes and a precise personality. He claimed Mdvanii had a soul and was his avatar. It was launched as the first "fashion doll as art" concept.

Shortly after the Barbie years, BillyBoy* invented Mdvanii as his own "fashion doll", this time not a commercially made toy, but an artistic creation. Mdvanii is an original concept and patented sculpting, inspired by 1950s and 60s fashion dolls. The looks originate from BillyBoy*'s Russian-origin mother by adoption. The doll was first made and shown in BillyBoy*'s Paris-based Surreal Bijoux showroom.

The doll clothes designed by BillyBoy* which are worn by Mdvanii are made in the tradition of French haute couture and were originally made in France but since 1997 are also made in Switzerland. They use the same fabrics, embroideries and details as French fashion-makers: Lesage embroideries, Gripoix jewellery details, as well as stocks of fabrics from the collection of BillyBoy*, as Raoul Dufy printed silk satin made for Paul Poiret given to him by his daughter Perrine de Wilde (née Poiret), vintage 1940s Schiaparelli satin given to BillyBoy* by the defunct House of Schiaparelli, and a swatch of Sonia Delaunay painted silk given to BillyBoy* by Delaunay when he was a teen.

Mdvanii was launched at the British department store Liberty & Co. in London, England on the initiative of Carol Lister, head fashion accessories buyer and the stores owner, Richard Stewart Liberty. Mdvanii was humanly scaled with a right and left foot, was "anatomically correct", a completely handmade and hand-painted doll. This "effigy" as BillyBoy* called the doll was made from resin in a very limited series and was a new concept. An edition of Mdvanii was made exclusively for F.A.O Schwarz and featured in their catalogues. The launch was tied-in with the premiere issue of Contemporary Doll Magazine where one of the Mdvanii F.A.O Schwarz Exclusives called Notre Dame was featured on the cover. The dolls featured in the New York store on 5th Avenue wore a wide variety of fashions and included detailed embroidered gowns which retailed for US$3,000 all the way up to $10,000 The doll's house, for which only ten examples were made, cost US$20,000. In New York City, at Bloomingdale's Mdvanii was shown during the "Vive La France" (1989) promotion, premiering for a gala to benefit The Institut Pasteur and Gay Men's Health Crisis and a display was made within the exhibition of 102 pieces of BillyBoy*'s haute couture collection. In Canada for the same show of BillyBoy*'s haute couture collection and the debut of Mdvanii it was sold exclusively through the then House of Christian Dior designer Gianfranco Ferré establishment at Le Cours Mont-Royal in Montreal Catalogues for both shows featured prominently Mdvanii and the wardrobe.

Mdvanii was also represented in Paris through a boutique-gallery which was entirely decorated in Schiaparelli Shocking pink and Paul Poiret-inspired furniture designed by the artists along with originals by Poiret's school of design called Atelier Martine. On the door was written "Luxe, Poupées et Volupté", paraphrasing Charles Baudelaire's famous words “Luxe, calme et volupté”.

Since the very beginning Mdvanii was represented in Japan by Sumiko Watanabe and SW Japan who had exclusive works made for her to show on a regular basis. She represents Mdvanii to this day but also the paintings of BillyBoy*.

== "Art within art" concept ==
Since the year 1989, Mdvanii had within its world "art within art" as the creators called it. It was an express desire to showcase the creator's artist and designer friends and artists whom they admired. It had miniature artworks created by young contemporary artists and designers and boxed Deluxe Edition Giftset ensembles. In Thailand for Image magazine a layout was given to a series of young designer's furniture made for Mdvanii. The ensemble of the 1989 debut series, called "Galerie d'art d'avant-garde" had an edition of 200 miniature watercolours by Skall, a young painter of the era, all framed with a cast metal frame from his own art. Later artists such as Duggie Fields, Jean Marc Dallenegra, Eric Raspaut and Fabrice Janosik did paintings and photographers Antoine Giacomoni, Pierre Rutschi, Christine Spengler did images. An edition of 10 hand-painted renditions of Man Ray's painting “A l’heure de l’Observatoire, les amoureux” painted by Lala came with the ““Hommage à Schiaparelli” Deluxe Edition Giftset for Mdvanii.

The hair and wigs were designed by hairdresser Alexandre de Paris. Alexandre de Paris personally did detailed drawings for hairstyles and his logo, which was created by Jean Cocteau is placed on all Mdvanii boxes and catalogues. One of the cosmetic face-paints of 1990 was supposed to be designed by Mel Odom but it was rejected at the last minute by BillyBoy* and never used. Instead, Mdvanii is hand-painted by BillyBoy*s life partner, artist Jean Pierre Lestrade (a.k.a. Lala). The illustration on the first box, which is predominantly turquoise, the signature colour, was created by French fashion illustrator Rene Gruau and the first catalogue interior sketches are by Clyde Smith, who originally did the drawings for the Random House series of Barbie doll books in the early 1960s.

Texts were written depicting an imaginary lifestyle through the eyes of each author and music, a classical waltz called "Hommage to Mdvanii" has been written and composed for Mdvanii by classical pianist Nicolas Bloomfield (GB). Poets have been inspired by Mdvanii. Poet Gerard Wozek (US) has written extensive poems about Mdvanii and the family such as a teenage brother Muio-Bix and the emerging Sunil Narayan, an American poet of Indian heritage, who composed classical poems to characters such as Soraya, Mdvanii's psychic Indian friend, and Ishwar, a Bollywood-inspired gay teenage boy. She has been shown in a number of music videos. In the early 1990s, for the song "Little Susie" BillyBoy* art directed and starred in a video for the Japanese girl group Suzy Susie. More recently, Lala's songs from the album Succès damnés (The Lost Album) have incorporated "Mdvaniiism." The video for "Edie Superstar" featured Mdvanii paintings and dolls. Another notable creation, "L'Amour n'a pas de prix," was specifically made for Diane Pernet's ASVOFF 3 – A Shaded View of Fashion Film 3, a film festival dedicated to fashion. This video premiered in September 2010 at the Centre national d'art et de culture Georges-Pompidou in Paris and was titled "Mdvaniiism – Classic Mdvanii Haute Couture 1989–1993: A Homage to Monsieur Yves Saint Laurent."

Mdvanii has been photographed by many known photographers including Studio Harcourt for The Sunday Times Magazine in London, England. Guy Bourdin did a cover try for Harper's Bazaar, Paris in 1989.

== Press reception ==
Mdvanii has had international press in a number of publications such as “Beautiful But No Bimbo: A Doll For The 1990s" in The New York Times,Vogue, Vogue Hommes International, Harper's Bazaar Elle, Glamour, Actuel (France),Playboy, ARTnews, The Sunday Times Magazine (Great Britain) and Paris, L'Officiel.

Mdvanii was briefly advertised in the specialized Barbie doll collector's magazine called Barbie Bazaar for a few years in the early 1990s.

== Reception in the contemporary art world and the doll collectors world ==
As Mdvanii was received into a variety of milieux, the doll collecting world and the contemporary art world had overlapping reactions. The Mdvanii doll created some confusion as doll collectors thought that BillyBoy*, being so well known and media-ized for his involvement with Barbie doll by Mattel was making a higher end type of doll for doll collectors. She was seen as an appealing fashion doll, but due to the high cost (from US$500 up to US$10,000) led to frustration amongst fashion doll, notably Barbie doll collectors. There was also some doubt in among European art critics, and the concept of an apparent fashion doll was controversial as a work of contemporary art and was not easily accepted even to those to whom she appealed and those who actually purchased it. Though she was thought of and referred to as une oeuvre d'art, it was debated regularly. She was however immediately acquired by major museums as early as 1990 and slowly over the first ten years exhibitions in art museums and sales in public art auctions in prestigious auction houses like Hotel Drouot in Paris were forthcoming.

Mdvanii is in many of the world's museums: Mdvanii is included in Le Musée de Louvre in the L’Union centrale des arts décoratifs (UCAD), Musée de la Mode et du Textile (UFAC), which is part of Musée des Arts Décoratifs inaugurated by the Union Française des Arts du Costume in Paris. She is in the Victoria and Albert Museum in London and Metropolitan Museum of Art in New York City and in private collections of art and dolls in the world. She was soon acquired by people such as Jackie Onassis, Mr. & Mrs Norman Mailer, Jean Paul Gaultier, Thierry Mugler and Sonia Rykiel The late Kelly Cole, adopted son of Nat King Cole and brother of singer Natalie Cole would offer his sister the first Dheei doll, best friend to Mdvanii.

== Exhibitions and presentations ==
In 1993, while BillyBoy* was working on the porcelain version of Mdvanii, the resin Mdvanii is presented as the “Ambassadrice of French High Fashion” by the magazine L’Officiel and was dressed by Thierry Mugler, Torrente, Louis Féraud, Guy Laroche and Révillon Haute Fourrure and other French haute couturiers and fashion houses, for Révillon she was presented during the runway fashion shows along with the human-sized furs.

L'Officiel ran a 14-page feature story on BillyBoy* and Mdvanii titled “L’incroyable BillyBoy*”. In this article she is shown wearing couture clothes and haute joaillerie by jewelmakers such as Van Cleef and Arpels, Harry Winston, Boucheron and Cartier. She is represented as the "L'Officiel Ambassadrice of French Haute Couture" (“Mdvanii, Mascot of Paris High Fashion”) and was available in a 1940s-inspired Liberty & Co. print outfit designed by BillyBoy* with a subscription through the magazine. She was photographed on a special cover for the magazine. These dolls had a special woven label with the L'Officiel logo in all the garments.

The porcelain versions of Mdvanii as are all the tribe of her friends, lovers and family (of which there are 15 members) are made in Sèvres, France. It was BillyBoy*'s express wish to keep within this French tradition. It was at this point that BillyBoy*, on the advice of Lala, started referring to Mdvanii as "a sculpture with a lifestyle". BillyBoy* did a series of portraits in black and white which feature Mdvanii and the other characters in her world in 1992–1993 and were shown in the FNAC photography galleries in Paris as well as the main cities of their spaces throughout France from 1993 to 1996. The show included large silkscreen paintings of Mdvanii. The traveling show was called "Les photographies de BillyBoy* - Le Jardin secret de Mdvanii”. A text was written for the occasion by gay author Edmund White. Mdvanii's universe expanded in the early 1990s with the introduction of Dheei, Mdvanii's Afro-European female lover, described as "Intelligent, Beautiful, Elegant." Alongside her came Rhogit-Rhogit, Mdvanii's tattooed bisexual lover, and Zhdrick, Dheei's brother. These characters were produced in both Basic Stud and Deluxe Edition Giftset versions. Notably, the male dolls included human-sized condoms. Since then, most Mdvanii dolls have included condoms as part of their packaging, reflecting the safe sex theme incorporated into the Mdvanii storyline, which was first introduced in the early catalogues.

In 1992, a limited-edition of 1200 signed and number Mdvanii boardgames came out, called "Mdvanii Society". The game was evocative of the type of teenage boardgames of the 1960s but aimed at a very adult audience with references to Parisian high fashion, Parisian mondaine society, sex, notably LGBT and Queer storylines and Karma. In 2008 Mdvanii had a brand of cigarettes distributed in Switzerland, flavoured with honey and licorice which came in a box marked "This Is A Work Of Art" and "Mdvaniiism de BillyBoy* & Lala". 500 packages were signed by the artists before being assembled and it was indicated that you may discover the signatures if the box was disassembled. It was also indicated that it should be considered a work of art.

In 1992, a larger, 60 centimeters articulated version of Mdvanii was made, called "Mademoiselle Mdvanii", made in porcelain and in a limited series. She would later be made also of a very hard composition papier-maché. By 2005, a slightly larger Mdvanii 30 centimeters was made in resin and papier maché and were referred to as "Cyber Sexual Mdvanii". In 1995 and 1996, in collaboration with AIDS-awareness and prevention group Arcat-Sida, FNAC, Vogue, Paris and Vogue Hommes International Mdvanii is again dressed by haute couturiers, and notably paired with Rhogit-Rhogit also dressed by these designers. The designers included: Bernard Sanz for Pierre Balmain, Sonia Rykiel, Myriam Schaefer for Nina Ricci prêt-à-porter, Michel Klein for Guy Laroche, Missoni, Givenchy Monsieur, Louis Féraud, Francesco Smalto, Walter Von Bierendonck, Stéphane Plassier, Lloyd Klein for The House of Grès, José Lévy, Claude Montana, Giorgio Armani, Paul Smith, Ozwald Boateng, Kenzo, Nuno Gama, Ricci Club (of the House of Nina Ricci), Josephus Thimister for Balenciaga and Dolce & Gabbana.

In autumn 2000, the "Intro Spectrum" collection was presented by Sumiko Watanabe in Tokyo, Japan. Watanabe explains that "in the first years of porcelain production, Mdvanii and her clan represented a myriad lifestyles but as the exploration of the artists continued, the world of Mdvanii delved deeper into the universe of the human psyche", embodied by the Intro Spectrum Collection of "ultra-visionary high fashion art dolls".

By 2000–2001, artists BillyBoy* and Lala (the latter having contributed to the creation of Mdvanii alongside BillyBoy* from its inception in 1994) were officially credited for their collaborative work. Though Lala was recognized for his contributions to Mdvanii by those familiar with the work as early as 1994, it was not until the "Mdvanii, Memories from Earth - The artworks of BillyBoy* and Lala"* exhibition at the Maison d'Ailleurs Museum of Science Fiction, Utopia and Extraordinary Journeys in 2000 that Lala's role was formally acknowledged. Curated by Patrick Gyger, the museum's chief curator, the exhibition featured a variety of futuristic Mdvanii artworks, including photography, paintings, drawings, and sculptures, along with BillyBoy*'s early works such as his Mister Modern collages and paintings. This exhibition marked the first official public acknowledgment of Mdvanii as a collaborative effort between BillyBoy* and Lala.

In 2004, the exhibition with accompanying book “Poupées” at La Halle Saint Pierre museum in Paris: 100 pieces of BillyBoy* & Lala Mdvanii art works and creations were featured in the exhibition, as well as photographs and paintings. Two Mdvaniis were featured on the poster for the exhibition.

In November 2006 - February, 2007, the exhibition “Mdvanii, Ceci n'est pas une poupée” was presented at the Museum of Contemporary Design and Applied Arts (Lausanne, Switzerland) and Musée de l’Elysée. For the Museum of Contemporary Design and Applied Arts, the show was curated by the museum's chief curator art and design expert Chantal Prod'Hom and for the Musée de l'Élysée, the show was curated by world-famous photography historian and museum chief curator William A. Ewing. The 80-page exhibition catalogue was called simply "BillyBoy" & Lala" and featured an interview between the curators and the artists speaking about Mdvanii as a conceptual art piece and her evolution.

== Manifesto Mdvaniiism and "This Is A Work Of Art" – mid-1990s onward ==
The artists as of 1989 called their work a "Mdvaniiism" between themselves and those who knew them however in the mid-1990s started to use this term publicly for the work By their definition a Mdvaniiism is "anything which evokes Mdvanii but does not necessarily or actually show her or even a human image". They claim to express Mdvaniiisms and their "Manifesto Mdvaniiism" as "Transgressive Queer Art" and use this -ism as a vehicle to express Outsider sensibilities through the paradox of her Old School acceptability. Therefore, a Mdvaniiism can be anything glamorous which evokes Mdvanii, anything complimenting the intellectual concept of Mdvanii or anything which the artists give their approbation to. As of the early 2000s they have used a stamp which reads, "Mdvaniiism de BillyBoy* & Lala" and also often stamped, "This Is A Work Of Art" and "Manifesto Mdvaniiism de BillyBoy* & Lala".

One of the most recent Mdvaniiisms was three performances which commenced on March 30, 2009 by BillyBoy* & Lala in Carouge, Switzerland at Flux Laboratory based on the unpublished but often excerpted memoires of BillyBoy* entitled"My American Family, In One Era, Out The Other". The event was called "Was BillyBoy* Barbie's Be-atch?"/ Identity. While BillyBoy* sat on a small stage and read his manuscript in regard to his experiences designing Barbie various photos of his career with the commercial doll and television commercials were shown behind him. The recital included an improvised dance performance using trompe-l'œil knit outfits of iconic Barbie clothes of 1959 (which BillyBoy* created in 1984 after designs he made in the 1970s) to tribal-like music BillyBoy* had recorded in 2008 called "Vroom Vroom" (appearing as a guest on Lala's recent album). This all took place in a gallery room hung with a series of 20 silkscreen paintings making a parody of the Warhol painting representing Barbie which BillyBoy* inspired the artist to create (according to Warhol in his diaries). This Warhol painting, created just before the artist died, was offered as a gift to BillyBoy* and was notably called "Portrait of BillyBoy*" by Warhol as a personal ironic joke between them It was first seen in the book on Barbie which BillyBoy* wrote. The parody of this painting represents a cartoonish Warhol-like head with doll-like hair and a somewhat jaded cellphone-type message face replacing the features. In addition ten gigantic cubes, representing children's toy blocks had the same image looking as if it was worn and old. The ensemble and interaction of these various BillyBoy* & Lala works expressed BillyBoy*'s disillusionment working for Mattel, Barbie's creator and with the stereotyped concept of the American Dream and represented perfectly an example of the Manifesto Mdvaniiism de BillyBoy* & Lala.

On the occasion of the March 13, 2008 Nuit du Quartier des Bains in Geneva, Switzerland, "Chez Soi, The Liquid Screen House of Tomorrow" Un Mdvaniiisme de BillyBoy* & Lala" in collaboration with furniture designer Philippe Cramer was shown at Cramer + Cramer, the designer's showroom. BillyBoy*'s paintings and sculptures were shown with the Mdvanii works as part of her world. The work represented two futuristic dolls houses conceived by BillyBoy* modeled on his paintings and the designer created the interiors. One was called "Chez Soi – Jour" and the other "Chez Soi – Nuit".

For 2011, there is work by Swiss photographer Frédéric Charrière which has been created in an extremely Deluxe Edition Giftset; a portfolio of original prints presented in a unique box made especially for the dressed Mdvanii doll. Fashion designers Anthony Villarreal (US), Laurent Mercier (Paris) and custom-made high fashion glovemaker Daniel Storto, (US) are amongst the guest designers.
