= Ysabel =

2007 fantasy novel by Guy Gavriel Kay

- Penguin Canada softcover
- Author: Guy Gavriel Kay
- Cover artist: Greg Banning & Lisa Jager
- Language: English
- Series: no
- Genre: Fantasy
- Published: 2007 (Penguin Group)
- Publication place: Canada
- Media type: Print
- Pages: 507
- ISBN: 978-0-451-46129-2
- OCLC: 71275435
- Dewey Decimal: 813/.54 22
- LC Class: PR9199.3.K39 Y83 2007

Ysabel is a fantasy novel by Canadian author Guy Gavriel Kay. It was first published in January 2007 by Viking Canada. It is Kay's first urban fantasy and the first book set outside his Europe-styled fantasy milieux since the publication of his first three novels in the 1980s (The Fionavar Tapestry). Kay lived in the countryside near Aix-en-Provence, the setting of Ysabel, while he wrote it. The story tells of 15-year-old Ned Marriner who discovers his magical heritage while staying with his photographer father in Provence. He meets an American exchange student, the two become involved in an ancient "story" of love, sacrifice, and magic unfolding in the present day, which draws in Ned's family and friends.

== Plot summary ==
Ned Marriner is in France with his father, Edward, a celebrated photographer who is working on a book about Provence. While his father shoots outside the deserted Saint-Sauveur Cathedral, Ned wanders in to look around. There he meets Kate Wenger, an American exchange student with a passion for ancient history and an extensive knowledge of the cathedral's past. The pair is startled by the appearance of a then-nameless man, who warns them to leave immediately, stating that they "have blundered into the corner of a very old story." Ned finds that he is able to sense the man's presence, a power of which he was previously unaware. Ned and Kate also notice an ancient carving of a woman on one of the church pillars, which the nameless man claims he created.

Frightened by the incident, Ned and Kate make plans to meet a few days later. Ned goes on a photo-scouting mission with his father's assistants, Greg, Steve, and Melanie, a young woman who is hyper-organized, witty, and well liked by everyone, including Ned. They head towards Mont Sainte-Victoire, a much-photographed location made famous by Paul Cézanne. But along the way, Ned falls suddenly and inexplicably ill. Arriving at the mountain, he is overcome by images of the slaughter that took place there centuries prior, when a Roman general killed thousands of Celts. He is rushed back to the team's villa, but once he has travelled only a short distance from the mountain, he recovers completely. Ned and Kate meet later that day in a coffee shop to discuss their situation. Ned is unnerved by the discovery of his strange abilities, while both are curious to find out more about the nameless man and his "story." Unaware that they are being watched by the nameless man, they make plans to meet again in Entremont, an ancient Celtic site, on the Eve of Beltaine. Kate leaves, but Ned becomes aware of the nameless man's presence and confronts him. The man tells him little, and soon leaves the cafe. Outside, however, he is attacked by unnaturally vicious dogs, and Ned steps in to defend him, saving his life.

Ned meets his Aunt Kim, a woman with mysterious powers. She tells him that she sensed he was in trouble, and came at once to offer her help. He discovers that she has the same ability to "sense" the presence of those with power, which she claims "runs in the family." They are confronted by a second nameless man, a large Celt with antlers, and are again warned to stay out of the "story." The Celt plans to kill the nameless man from the cathedral (who he calls a "Roman"), and threatens Ned for having helped him, but Aunt Kim manages to bluff their way out of the situation. Despite Ned's misgivings, Kate, who is acting strangely, convinces him to follow their original plan of visiting Entremont on Beltaine. They plan to be away from the place before dark, but not long after they enter the site, darkness falls several hours early. They hide from a ghostly procession of druids that arrives soon after and becomes more solid as the light continues to fade. The nameless Roman from the cathedral confronts them, ordering them to flee as soon as they can. Kate begins to struggle, possessed with a strange desire to join the druidic ceremony below. Just before she escapes, however, Melanie arrives, looking for Ned. As she approaches the waiting Celts, she is transformed into Ysabel, possessed by the spirit of an ancient woman who the two nameless men have been fighting over for centuries. Ysabel names the Roman Phelan and the Celt Cadell, and orders them to spend three days searching for her. Whoever finds her first will win her. Ned and Kate discover that this is the "story": a battle between two men for one woman's love, which has been repeated in various incarnations throughout the millennia.

Ned and Kate leave unnoticed, stricken by the loss of Melanie. He tells his father, Aunt Kim, Greg, and Steve everything that has happened, and also asks his mother, Meghan, to leave Sudan, where she is working with Doctors Without Borders, to be with them as they attempt to get Melanie back. Meghan and Kim, her sister, had a falling out when they were younger, and there are some strained moments once Meghan arrives and they attempt to work together and reconcile their differences. They are aided by Uncle Dave, Kim's husband, who also possesses special abilities and knowledge of the supernatural. Ned and his fellow searchers visit various historical sites in Provence over the following two days, trying to track down Ysabel's hiding place before Phelan or Cadell in the hopes that they will be able to rescue Melanie. Following a hint from one of the wild boars that are common throughout the South of France, Ned realizes that Ysabel is hiding on Mont Sainte-Victoire, the site where he experienced his mysterious illness. He decides to go there alone, as he is a marathon runner and will be able to reach the summit fastest. Despite feeling sick the entire way, Ned makes it to the summit before Phelan or Cadell, discovering Ysabel in a cavern that looks out over Provence. Cadell and Phelan arrive shortly thereafter, both claiming the victory. Ysabel points out that it was Ned who arrived first, and reveals that Ned is distantly descended from the original Ysabel (who would have gone by a different name). Both Phelan and Cadell follow Ysabel's orders to jump into the chasm, ending their story once and for all. When Ned looks at Ysabel again, he finds that she too has departed, leaving Melanie safe and unharmed in her place.

== Relation to other series ==
Two characters from The Fionavar Tapestry, Dave Martyniuk and Kimberly Ford, appear in the book as well.

== Reception ==
Ysabel has been one of Kay's most successful novels. It was nominated for the White Pine Award, and spent five weeks as the #1 bestseller in Canada. The Globe and Mail called Ysabel "a splendid addition to (Kay's) body of work," praising the novel's well-developed characters, interweaving of myth and believable relationships, and "breathless realism". Ysabel was awarded the 2008 World Fantasy Award—Novel.
