= A Brightness Long Ago =

2019 novel by Guy Gavriel Kay

- Front cover of the Canadian edition
- Author: Guy Gavriel Kay
- Language: English
- Genre: Fantasy
- Publisher: Viking Press
- Publication date: 2019
- Publication place: Canada
- Pages: 448

A Brightness Long Ago is a historical fantasy novel by Canadian writer Guy Gavriel Kay published in 2019 by Viking Press. It is inspired by the events of 15th-century Italy leading to the Italian Wars, specifically the feud between Federico da Montefeltro and Sigismondo Pandolfo Malatesta.

It is a pseudo-prequel set in the fantasy world of Batiara decades before the events of the 2016 novel Children of Earth and Sky, but readable as a stand-alone novel. In this novel, Batiara serves as Kay's analogue to early Renaissance Italy.

The dust jacket cover art of the Canadian and US editions depicted birds and was created by Adrian Hillman. Embedded in the dust jacket were specks of gold foil whose sparkling reflection of light made it "stand out" on bookstore shelves.

== Plot ==
The story is set about 1,000 years after the events of The Sarantine Mosaic duology, shortly before the fall of Sarantium. It begins as a narrative recollection by Guidanio Cerra, an aging councillor nicknamed Danio who in his youth was admitted to a prestigious school despite being a tailor's son. This leads him to meet the chief steward of nobleman Count Uberto, and later a woman named Adria Ripoli. The latter is daughter of a duke, and plans to assassinate Uberto, known as The Beast.

From Danio's recollection the plot shifts attention to a healer named Jelena, and subsequently to a political conflict between Folco Cino d’Acorsi, who is the uncle to Adria, and Teobaldo Monticola di Remigio. Danio's narrative describes the military and personal clashes between Cino and Monticola.

Adria and Cino conceive a plan for her to reside in a farmhouse near the city, which eventually brings her to the attention of Uberto, known as "The Beast" for his sexual and murderous proclivities. Danio, now employed in the palace of Uberto, may endanger himself or Adria when she is summoned by Uberto to the palace.

== Reception ==
In a review for The Globe and Mail, Andray Domise states that A Brightness Long Ago is a "return to the narrative form" Kay demonstrated in The Lions of Al-Rassan, with characters that are better developed as a result of greater focus on the story revolving around the principal characters. Kay also devotes more of the story to describing the lives of the female characters, instead of focusing on an exceptional female lead as he had in Children of Earth and Sky, in which the secondary women characters were "accessories and playthings". Gary K. Wolfe, in a review for Locus, states that the two principal female characters in the novel "are among [the] most impressive" Kay has written.

Bill Capossere describes Kay's writing as having "supreme elegance and grace", and Tadiana Jones states that Kay has "lyrical and profoundly thoughtful storytelling". Niall Alexander, in his review for Tor.com, states that the fringe characters were created with a "depth and tenderness and intelligence" by which the insignificant are given significance.

A review by Kirkus Reviews stated that the book exhibits Kay's "usual elements", including numerous characters, extensive worldbuilding based on historical research, significant events altering the world, and writing "that sometimes gets carried away with itself".

It was one of six finalists for the 2020 Aurora Award for Best Novel.
