= The Last Light of the Sun =

2004 novel by Guy Gavriel Kay

- First edition
- Author: Guy Gavriel Kay
- Cover artist: Larry Rostant
- Language: English
- Genre: Fantasy
- Published: 2004 by Viking Canada
- Publication place: Canada
- Media type: Print
- Pages: 501
- ISBN: 0-14-305148-2
- OCLC: 53013726
- Dewey Decimal: 813.54
- LC Class: PR9199.3.K39
- Preceded by: The Sarantine Mosaic
- Followed by: The Lions of Al-Rassan

The Last Light of the Sun is a 2004 fantasy novel by Canadian writer Guy Gavriel Kay. Like many of his books, it is set in a world that draws heavily upon real times, events, places and people. In this particular book, the period is the Viking invasions of Saxon England. The story concerns a young Erling's attempt to prove himself as a warrior, his father's attempts to make amends for his mistakes, a young prince searching for revenge and a King's attempt to transform his realm into a more civilized one that will resist attacks from the Erlings forever. The books main themes are revenge, violence, the passing of an era, clash of cultures, and love, especially between father and son.

== Connections to other works by Kay ==
The novel is set in the same world as Kay's The Lions of Al-Rassan and The Sarantine Mosaic, taking place at an indeterminate time. A passing reference to the mosaic Crispin created at the end of The Sarantine Mosaic and to the works of Rustem implies that decades or perhaps centuries have passed. A conversation about Leontes' time on the throne puts The Last Light of the Sun roughly three hundred years afterwards. Asharite merchants from Al-Rassan, and references to the Khalifate of Al-Rassan in the description of Firaz ibn Bakir, put this book chronologically either before or during the events of The Lions of Al-Rassan.

== Analogies to real world history ==
- Aeldred, is clearly based on Alfred the Great with his former nemesis Ingemar being based on Guthrum and the famed Sigur Volgansson bearing some resemblance to Ragnar Lothbrok while his grandson, Ivarr, is named for Ivar the Boneless.
- The Erling culture is analogous to that of the Vikings. The "Cyngael" and "Anglcyn" are based on the Welsh people and the Anglo-Saxons, respectively. "Rheden" appears to be an analogue of the Anglo-Saxon kingdom of Mercia.
- The main religion of Jadism, the one hated by the Erlings, is clearly based upon Christianity. This religion also appears in The Lions of Al-Rassan and The Sarantine Mosaic. Meanwhile, the Erling gods such as Ingavn and Thunir are clearly inspired by Odin and Thor respectively, among others in Norse mythology.

== Plot ==
Bern Thorkellson, a young Erling man, has been a slave on Rabady Island in Vinmark since his father Thorkell killed a man in a drunken fit of rage. He escapes from Rabady Island with the aid of a slave girl, and travels to Jormsvik, a fortress for elite Erling mercenaries. He gains admittance to their ranks by killing one of their members and joins a raiding party heading from Vinmark to Anglcyn.

In Cyngael, Alun ap Owyn and his brother Dai, two Princes of the province of Cadyr, arrive at the house of Brynn ap Hywll, a renowned fighter and leader of another Cyngael province. They are accompanied by the famed Jaddite cleric Ceinon. In an attack by Erling raiders led by Ivarr and Mikkel Ragnarsson, grandsons of the famed Erling raider Sigur Volgansson who was killed by Brynn in battle, Dai is killed and his soul is taken by a fairy to the fairy queen. Alun witnesses and is deeply scarred by this event, though he later begins a relationship with one of the faeries. Mikkel is also killed in the raid.

Among the Erlings who participated in the attack is Bern's father, Thorkell Einarsson, who is taken captive and becomes a retainer in Brynn's household.

Anglcyn is ruled by Aeldred, who in his youth saved the kingdom from Erling conquest from both Sigur Volgansson and another Erling warlord named Ingemar, defeating the latter in a decisive battle and making him into a vassal. Aeldred is building a strong nation and has begun to collect manuscripts and foster scholarship. One of the scholars he wishes to attract to his court is Ceinon, who is unwilling to give up his role as leader of the Jaddite faith among the Cyngael. Throughout the book, both Aeldred and Ceinon grapple with their faith in Jad and the reality of the ancient powers once worshipped by both their peoples.

Bern's team of mercenaries attack an Anglcyn fort under Ivarr's direction, but are defeated by Aeldred's professional army following Ivarr's killing of a powerful Earl and friend of Aeldred's who they had originally intended to ransom. Bern and Thorkell have a brief reunion, but Bern rejoins the Erlings in a new quest to kill Brynn ap Hwyll and regain Volgansson's sword, at Ivarr's urging, though he is primarily motivated by sadism, desiring to blood eagle Brynn and his family for his own amusement while intending to use the cover of avenging his grandfather. However, Brand, the leader of the mercenaries, kills Ivarr for his trickery before they set out.

Once the Erlings arrive in Cyngael, they find themselves outnumbered and their fate is decided in a contest of single combat. Thorkell offers himself as the champion of the Cyngael and is slain in an act of sacrifice for his son. Prompted by Thorkell's final words, the Erlings depart and once again change course to loot an undefended monastery in a southern land. They return to Jormsvik with great wealth. Bern later leaves the mercenary company, intending to settle down on Rabady and marries the slave girl, herself now a seer for the island's new governor, who helped him escape.

After the combat, Alun uses Volgansson's sword to kill the souls of mortals that had been taken as the faerie-queen's lovers and later discarded, including the soul of Dai. Alun's relationship with the faerie ends and he later marries Aeldred's younger daughter, while Aeldred's son seeks to marry Brynn's daughter.

Throughout the novel references are made towards the slow but steady growth of civilization as kingdoms are built, the wilderness is pushed back and it is revealed that even the most lawless places such as Jormsvik will eventually fall under the sway of a king.

== Reception ==
January Magazine called The Last Light of the Sun Kay's "darkest and in some ways most ambitious novel to date". A review on SF Site called it "an extremely evocative tale". A second review on SF Site by Alma H. Hromic noted: "It's another vivid, complex fantasy from Kay's pen. There is the usual sense that there is more, so much more, in the background of this story than the reader has been told -- the sense of glimpsing a few shining threads in a larger tapestry. A book to savour."

In a review for Quill & Quire, Cori Dusmann stated that the "in-depth examination of so many characters slows the tale down" with "every question answered ... and little left to wonder about".

== Awards ==
- Kay was nominated for the Canadian Sunburst Award nomination in 2005 for The Last Light of the Sun.
