= The Fionavar Tapestry =

Novel trilogy by Guy Gavriel Kay

- Cover of the Canadian omnibus edition
- The Summer Tree; The Wandering Fire; The Darkest Road; Ysabel (related)
- Author: Guy Gavriel Kay
- Cover artist: Martin Springett (original release)
- Country: Canada
- Discipline: Fantasy; Portal fantasy
- Published: 1984–1986, 2007
- No. of books: 3
- Website: brightweavings.com/books/books/the-fionavar-tapestry/

The Fionavar Tapestry is a book series of fantasy novels by Canadian author Guy Gavriel Kay, published between 1984 and 1986. The novels are set in both contemporary Toronto and the secondary world of Fionavar.

== Premise ==
Five University of Toronto senior law and medical students who are drawn into the 'first world of the Tapestry' by the mage Loren Silvercloak. Once there, each character discovers their own role and destiny in the framework of an ancient conflict.

== Books in the series ==
=== Primary ===
- The Summer Tree
- The Wandering Fire
- The Darkest Road

=== Secondary ===
Ysabel, while not part of The Fionavar Tapestry proper, features two of the same characters and often refers to the events of the trilogy.

== Characters ==
=== The Five ===
==== University of Toronto students ====
- Kevin Laine (Liadon) is described as witty, bright, outgoing, and spirited. He has fair-coloured hair, and is characterized to be often intensely and deeply affected by acts of love.
- Paul Schafer (Pwyll Twiceborn) is described to be highly intelligent and withdrawn. At the beginning of the story, he is haunted by the death of his girlfriend in a car accident that he believes was his fault.
- Dave Martyniuk (Davor) is a star basketball player who carries emotional scars from his Eastern European immigrant father's rough treatment of him as a child. Throughout the story, he has difficulty accepting or offering friendship.
- Kimberly Ford (The Seer) is portrayed to be quiet, intelligent, sensitive, but decisive.
- Jennifer Lowell (Guinevere) is described as cool and reserved. She is considered beautiful, and has green eyes. In the backstory, she is a former lover of Kevin's, but they remain good friends.

=== Arthurian characters ===
The story borrows elements of medieval literature, particularly King Arthur, who is known to the characters in the books as "The Warrior". Other notable inclusions are Lancelot and Guinevere. Parts of the story focuses on reenactment of the Arthurian stories.

=== The Deities ===
- The Weaver is the creator of the tapestry, the fabric of time, causality and existence, and all the worlds within the trilogy. They are described by the inhabitants of Fionavar as a "hands-off" deity, who acts only to bring about events required by fate (the "weave of the Tapestry") and who otherwise does not interfere with free will. It is mentioned that The Weaver's only law is that the gods cannot act directly upon the Tapestry without being summoned and bound by mortals. To do so always requires sacrifice, a rule which is enforced by other gods if it is violated. The gods can, however, act indirectly by choosing mortal champions and bestowing gifts and powers upon them.
- Mörnir is the lord of the summer tree, the patron god of the royal house of the High Kingdom of Brennin. He is described to be a sky god who is connected with ravens and oak trees.
- Dana is the goddess of the earth and the moon and written as the "mother, sister, daughter, bride of the God". She is stated to be an earth mother deity worshipped by the Priestesses of Gwen Ystrat, the ruler of blood magic and the avarlith, the power derived from the earth. Her name is directly inspired by the Irish goddess Danu.
- Ceinwen is a goddess of the wood and the hunt who is revered by the Dalrei, a tribal people of the plains of Fionavar. She is seen to kill all men of Fionavar who witness her hunting.
- Cernan of the Beasts is the god of animals and wild things who is also revered by the Dalrei. He is characterized to be crowned with the antlers of a stag. His name is derived from the Celtic deity Cernunnos.
- Macha and Nemain are twin goddesses of war who are directly inspired by the Irish mythological figures associated with The Morrigan.
- Liranan is the god of the sea, whose name is derived from the Celtic deity Manannan mac Lir.
- Owein and the Wild Hunt is a group of once-mortal kings who together comprise a cosmic force of randomness and wildness; their existence is said to be necessary for mortals to have free will. In the books, they are described to be bound to the Cave of the Sleepers and can be woken and summoned by the artifact Owein's Horn but must be led by a mortal child who becomes one of them and rides with them. The group is inspired by the Wild Hunt of European folklore.
- Rakoth Maugrim is the renegade god, characterized as the enemy of the Weaver. In the series, he is seen being jealous of the Weaver's creation, and breaks into Fionavar just as the Weaver completes his work. Since he came from outside the Weaver's Loom, he has no thread in the Tapestry and cannot be destroyed. A thousand years ago before the trilogy is set, the combined might of all the races of Fionavar fought against him, and after a tremendous battle, they defeated him and chained him beneath the mountain Rangat. His eventual escape begins the events of the trilogy.
- Galadan is the lord of the Andain, which is defined as an offspring of a mating between god and mortal. He is seen to be a shapechanger who can take the form of a malevolent black wolf with a silver splash on its head. He is described to be nihilistic.
- Flidais is another Andain who lives in Pendaran Wood who claims to have lived as the legendary bard Taliesin in the trilogy's version of Earth.
- Fordaetha of Ruk is the ice queen of the Barrens in the far north. She is seen to be able to freeze men by touching them.

=== Other characters ===
- Darien is the son of Jennifer and Rakoth Maugrim, Darien is described to be precisely balanced between Dark and Light. He is seen to take the form of a white owl.
- Ailell dan Art is the High King of Brennin. He has two sons, the elder Aileron, who is in exile. The younger Diarmuid is described to be a fearless and elegant fighter, but also frivolous, impulsive, and shallow. Diarmuid falls in love with and is eventually betrothed to Sharra in the series, who is known as the Dark Rose of Cathal.
- Council of the Mages, which includes Loren Silvercloak, and his source Matt Sören, a dwarf; Metran, First Mage, and his source Denbarra; Teyrnon, and his source Barak. According to the story, each source is bound to the mage he serves by magical rituals and oaths, and provides from his lifeforce the energy needed to power the mage's magic works. This link can be drawn upon even to the source's death, although this will then render the mage permanently powerless. The Book of Nilsom, (a grimoire belonging to a mad mage of the past), is a book in the trilogy described to include secret knowledge of an abominable method by which a mage may gain power from multiple sources. The Council of the Mages is headquartered in Brennin and said to include up to seven mages. At the time of the story, there are only three.
- The Dalrei are seen to be plains-dwelling tribes of nomadic hunters who both hunt and guard the vast herds of eltor in the northern part of Fionavar. Each tribe is led by its chieftain, helped by the tribe's shaman, who is ritually blinded in youth the better to focus the sight of his inner eye. The Third Tribe, under the leadership of Ivor dan Bannor and their shaman, Gereint is a major character in the trilogy. Ivor's wife Leith, and their children Levon, Tabor and Cordeliane also play important parts.
- The lios alfar or Light Elves, live in Daniloth, which is described as a beautiful land in the northwest corner of the land which is wrapped in a confusing mist as protection from Maugrim and others who wish them evil. The lios alfar are said to be Maugrim's bitterest foes, "most hated by the dark, for their name is light" (ST, p. 138).
- The dwarves dwell in the mountains near the twin peaks of Banir Lök and Banir Tal. Before the exposition of the story, fierce fighters have recently been led into questionable acts by Kaen and Blöd.
- The Men of Eridu, a proud and independent race, have been wiped out by a mysterious poisonous rain before the beginning of the trilogy. The only remaining man is Faebur, who is in exile and thus not present during the rainfall.
- The Paraiko, the peaceful giants of the mountains. In the story's setting, the ancient Paraiko long ago bound Owein and the Wild Hunt to obey Connla's Horn. The Paraiko refuse violence even in self-defense; in exchange, they are protected by the curse of the Paraiko, drawn down on whoever sheds their blood.

=== Creatures ===
- Avaia, a black swan with vicious teeth and an odor of corruption. They are a servant of Maugrim.
- Curdardh, nicknamed "the Eldest", who is a metamorphosing earth-demon of rock and stone who dwells in and guards Pendaran Wood.
- Imraith-Nimphais, a flying red unicorn, this ability being a gift of Dana for the war against Maugrim.
- Uathach, an "enhanced" urgach who, with Galadan, directs Maugrim's forces in battle.
- Urgach, who are large powerful warriors of the dark.
- Svart alfar, which are small, loathsome, dispensable dark creatures that eat men and elves.

== Themes ==
Kay's central concept in the novels is that Fionavar is the first of worlds, particularly in a mythological sense; the sagas and tales of other worlds originate (or culminate) in this most primary of settings. Because of this, what happens in Fionavar ripples into other worlds—thus, the victory or defeat of Rakoth Maugrim has immediate importance for Fionavar and implications for the fictional Earth within the trilogy.

The story puts an emphasis on the importance of free will, as demonstrated in Jennifer's decisions to keep Darien and later to send Lancelot away, Finn's choice to follow his destiny with Owein and the Wild Hunt, Paul and Kevin's acceptance of the role of sacrifice (though in different ways), Diarmuid's decision to take the final battle with Uathach on himself enabling Arthur to survive the last battle, and the importance of Darien's ultimate choice of allegiance at the end. When the Baelrath (the "Warstone"), a ring given to Kim by Ysanne which is crafted to call various powers into the battle against the Dark, demands that Kim summon and bind the secret power in the Dwarves' sacred lake of Calor Diman, she refuses due to her characterized moral reasons.

Another theme is that of forgiveness. For example, Arthur has long since forgiven Guinevere and Lancelot; throughout the series, one of Paul's goal is to learn to forgive himself for his girlfriend Rachel's death; Galadan, in the end, is forgiven his evil past and offered a second chance; Darien at the end understands his mother's treatment of him and forgives her.

One prominent theme is power and the price one pays for it. Often in the book, the price for power lies with someone else, as witnessed by the sources to the mages; as well as Kim's summoning power, the fee is often paid by whatever or whoever was summoned.

== References and inspirations ==
=== Real world ===
Stonehenge is featured in the second book. The ancient caves of Dun Maura are inspired by the Oracle at Delphi as well as prehistoric caves such as Lascaux. The association of blood with magic (Kevin/Liadon, the avarlith) are inspired by ancient mythologies. The Dalrei are shown to share many aspects of Native American lifestyle, beliefs and ritual, including being nomadic, and the significant role of shamans.

=== Tolkien ===
Fionavar has many similarities to J. R. R. Tolkien's Middle-earth, and may have been directly influenced by it (Kay worked with Christopher Tolkien to edit The Silmarillion and prepare it for publication). The map of Fionavar shares many similarities to that of Tolkien's world.

=== Myths and legends ===
The stories incorporate, directly or indirectly, several other myths, the most direct being King Arthur, with Arthur, Lancelot, and Guinevere/Jennifer, who in the story works out their love triangle and atones for their sins. Kay uses a fragment of the Arthurian cycle, the May Babies, to explain Arthur's punishment of repeated rebirth/death in battle against evil, as shown in "[T]he Weaver had marked him down for a long unwinding doom. A cycle of war and expiation under many names, and in many worlds, that redress be made for the children and for love" (WF, p. 40). The grey dog who fights Galadan to protect Paul is shown to be Cavall, a dog from King Arthur's stories. Lancelot's encounter with Leyse of the lios alfar, her love for him, and subsequent departure by boat for the lios alfar's home in the West is a retelling of the tale of Lancelot and Elaine of Astolat. When Leyse of the Swan Mark, a member of the lios alfar, gives up her life as a result of her hopeless love for Lancelot, she lies down in a boat and sails away, which is a retelling of Tennyson's "The Lady of Shalott," and the story of Elaine.

The powerful oak known as the Summer Tree is similar to Yggdrasil, the World Ash Tree of Norse mythology. Norse elements also appear in Mörnir, who, with his twin ravens Thought and Memory (Odin's Huginn and Muninn), and the epithet "of the Thunder," is inspired by a combination of Thor and Odin. The lios alfar (light elves) and svart alfar (dark elves) are influenced by the Scandinavian Álfar.

The Cauldron of Khath Meigol and its powers of resurrection are inspired by Welsh mythology's tale of the Cauldron of Annwn. A number of the deities may have Celtic or Welsh roots: Paul is known as Pwyll after his sacrifice, while Macha and Nemain are directly taken from Irish mythology. The wild boar that attacks Kevin, marking him as Liadon, closely resembles the Twrch Trwyth. Cader Sedat, the island where the renegade mage Metran works his dark magic in The Wandering Fire, is the analogue of Caer Sidi from the poem Preiddeu Annwfn, a poem that is, in the trilogy, ascribed to Taliesin, one of the names used by Flidais.

The Wild Hunt was a folk myth prevalent in former times across Germany, the Sub-Roman Britain and also Scandinavia.

The entrapment of Rakoth Maugrim the Unraveller is similar to one of the Four Great Classical Novels of Chinese literature, The Journey to the West. In the prologue of The Summer Tree, Rakoth Maugrim is bound by five wardstones and imprisoned under Mount Rangat.

== Awards ==
- The Wandering Fire won the 1987 Prix Aurora Award in the English category.
- The Wandering Fire won the 1987 Casper Award for best speculative fiction.
- Guy Gavriel Kay was nominated for a Mythopoeic Fantasy Award for Literature in 1987 for The Fionavar Tapestry.

== Reviews ==
- Backstab #11
