= Children of Earth and Sky =

2016 novel by Guy Gavriel Kay

- Front cover of the US edition
- Author: Guy Gavriel Kay
- Language: English
- Genre: Fantasy
- Publisher: New American Library
- Publication date: 2016
- Publication place: Canada

Children of Earth and Sky is a historical fantasy novel by Canadian writer Guy Gavriel Kay published in 2016. It was the first novel he wrote after receiving the Order of Canada.

Kay's subsequent novel A Brightness Long Ago is a prequel to Children of Earth and Sky.

The dust jacket cover art of the first Canadian and US editions was created by Larry Rostant.

== Plot ==
The book is set in the same fantasy world as The Sarantine Mosaic, but following the decline and fall of Sarantium. Leaders of states that are Jaddite, having been greatly affected by an epidemic, are worried of an impending threat by the growing Osmanli empire whose cultural and religious traditions may eclipse their own. Meanwhile, the duke of the Jaddite city of Seressa seeks to secure and strengthen his position.

There are five principal and numerous secondary and ancillary characters. The warrior Danica Gradek is a skilled archer seeking vengeance for the abduction of her brother Neven by the Osmanli; she is recruited by Senjan pirates. The young artist Pero Villani is ambitious and tries to court the spy Leonora Valeri, previously exiled by her father. The Dubrova merchant Marin guides them through the "political and physical hazards" of their eastward journey. Pero is chosen to paint a western-style portrait of the khalif Gurçu, the principal Osmanli threat. Danica and Leonora meet during a raid by the pirates, and develop a "survival friendship".

Senjan is a nation state that opposes Osmanli expansion and has contemptuous regard for those who trade with them, raiding their ships. Dubrova is an emergent trading nation that avoids antagonizing the powerful Seressa empire that dominates trade. The latter maintains an extensive spy network.

== Concept ==
Kay states that while conducting research for his novels, he often acquires folkloric knowledge and learns the history of various places. For Children of Earth and Sky, he stated in an interview with Clarkesworld Magazine that among his favourites were learning about the origins of Venetian bookbinding and about the history of the Croatian city of Dubrovnik.

The novel is based on 16th-century Europe, in which the cities of Sarantium and Seressa are analogues for Constantinople and the Republic of Venice. In an "Ask Me Anything" interview on the r/Fantasy subreddit, Kay stated that the name Seressa was chosen as an echo of "La Serenissima", a traditional name associated with the city state when it was considered a Most Serene Republic. The city of Dubrova is an analogue of Dubrovnik, Senjen and its pirates an analogue for Senj and the Uskoks, and Prague also has an analogue.

The Osmanli empire is based on the Ottoman Empire and the Jaddite religion modelled on Christianity.

== Reception ==
In a review for the Chicago Tribune, Gary K. Wolfe stated that the "lush historical tapestry" provides the setting for "compelling, sympathetic characters" and "convincing secondary characters" with stories that intersect in a clever fashion. In a review for Locus, he states that the characters are both complex and nuanced, typical of Kay's best work. Writing for Fantasy Literature, Tadiana Jones states that Kay "weaves together the lives of several fascinating individuals".

Kirkus Reviews described the setting as "lush, well-researched, and well-painted", and that history may be the "strongest character" and identifiable as the Mediterranean of the 16th century. In a review for The Globe and Mail, David A. Hobbs states that one can "trace the outlines of the Adriatic 15th century, but ... they disappear behind images from Kay's own imagination". Jones stated that the worldbuilding in the novel is "remarkable" and imbued with "richness and complexity". In the book, Kay includes a list of non-fiction sources about the settings used as background for the book.

Kay's use of the supernatural is described as intentionally restrained, and the story has a "light touch with the fantasy". In a review for Tor.com, Niall Alexander describes Kay as "contemporary fiction’s finest fantasist".

Hobbs also stated that Kay's prose is an obstacle, because he describes a character as unconventional instead of placing that character in an action (such as "loosing arrows accurately and effectively while the conventional young women look on conventionally") that demonstrates the trait. He said that he could not "stop finding bothersome sentence structures similar to those in The Lord of the Rings and other contemporary fantasy novels".

Writing for Fantasy Literature, Bill Capossere stated that Children of Earth and Sky covers a "grand sweeping tide of history" including "the rise and fall of cities and empires, the collision of religion and culture, a messy continent-striding tangle of politics, religion, economics, and ethnicity". He also stated that the story shifts seamlessly from the macro to the micro by "scaling down epic events so that history becomes humanized". Jones states that the story is "compelling reading, epic in scope but also closely personal".

The pace of the novel is generally slow, also typical of Kay's works, and in his review Alexander states that Kay is not the "sort of author to race towards a destination" and that the "joy of his novels is invariably in the journeys".
