= A Song for Arbonne =

1992 novel by Guy Gavriel Kay

- Front cover of Canadian hardback edition
- Author: Guy Gavriel Kay
- Language: English
- Genre: Fantasy
- Publisher: Viking Press
- Publication date: 1992
- Publication place: Canada

A Song for Arbonne is a novel by Canadian writer Guy Gavriel Kay published in 1992. It is set in a fantasy world with two moons and is loosely based on 12th-century Provence and the Albigensian Crusade.

There were 25,000 copies of the book published in the first printing.

== Plot ==
The story is set in Arbonne, a fictional country bordered by the countries of Arimonda, Gorhaut, Götzland, Portezza and Valensa. Residents of these countries worship one of two deities, the war god Corannos or the mother goddess Rian.

The main protagonist is a Coran soldier named Blaise from Gorhaut. Like other men of his country, he is a ruthless warrior devoted to Corannos. A mercenary for hire, he leaves the increasingly politically corrupt Gorhaut, in which a puppet king has been installed after the resolution of a long war with Valensa. The leaders intend to conquer Arbonne to the south, a land ruled by women and observant of the god Rian, and abolish the worship of the female deity.

The blind Priestess of Rian, religious leader in Arbonne, informs the country's political leaders of the impending arrival of Blaise, who is hired by the powerful duke and troubadour Bertran de Talair. The latter is engaged in a decades-long feud with another nobleman, Urte de Miraval.

== Reception ==
In a review published in November 1992, Kirkus Reviews stated that the novel was "one of the most impressive fantasies in a long time". Viviane Crystal, in a review for the Historical Novel Society, stated that Kay "remains a master craftsman of historical fiction".

The novel was nominated for both the 1993 and 1994 Aurora Awards for Long-form English work, and the 1993 Locus Awards for Best Fantasy Novel.
