= The Lions of Al-Rassan =

1995 novel by Guy Gavriel Kay

- First edition
- Author: Guy Gavriel Kay
- Cover artist: Gerard Gauci
- Language: English
- Genre: Historical fantasy
- Publisher: Viking Canada
- Publication date: May 1995
- Publication place: Canada
- Media type: Print (Hardback and paperback)
- Pages: 510
- ISBN: 0-06-105217-5
- OCLC: 32089602

The Lions of Al-Rassan is a 1995 historical fantasy novel by Canadian writer Guy Gavriel Kay. It is set in a peninsula of the same world in which The Sarantine Mosaic and The Last Light of the Sun are set, and is based on Moorish Spain. The novel concentrates on the relationships between the three peoples: the Kindath (analogous to the Jews), the Asharites (analogous to the Muslims), and the Jaddites (analogous to the Christians), although the religions of the Kindath, Asharites, and Jaddites, as described in the novel, bear no relation to Judaism, Islam, and Christianity.

The three protagonists in the novel are from each of these three races and religions: Jehane bet Ishak, a Kindath physician in Fezana; Rodrigo Belmonte (loosely based on El Cid), a Jaddite captain of a company of cavalry; and Ammar ibn Khairan (loosely based on Muhammad ibn Ammar), an Asharite poet, mercenary, and advisor to King Almalik of Cartada.

== Synopsis ==
=== Premise ===
Three major religions exist in the peninsula in which the story is set. Jaddites and Asharites are the largest groups; the Kindath are a smaller group which is often persecuted and owns minimal territory.

The peninsula now known as Al-Rassan was formerly known as Esperaña when under Jaddite control. The land is split between three Jaddite kingdoms in the north (Valledo, Ruenda, and Jaloña) and several Asharite city-states in the south, of which Cartada and Ragosa figure most prominently in the story. After centuries of being dominated by the Asharites, the Jaddite kingdoms are regaining their strength, while the once-powerful caliphate of Al-Rassan is divided and vulnerable.

Fifteen years prior to the events of the main story, Ammar ibn Khairan assassinated the last Caliph of Esperaña on the orders of Almalik I of Cartada.

=== Plot ===
The city of Fezana lies in the north of Al-Rassan. It pays parias to the Jaddite kingdom of Valledo. King Almalik I of Cartada organizes a purge of the wealthy citizens of Fezana to be blamed on his longtime courtier Ammar ibn Khairan. Jehane bet Ishak, a physician in Fezana, unwittingly saves one of her patients from the purge.

Ammar joins forces with the heir to Cartada, also called Almalik, and assassinates Almalik I. The new king Almalik II takes the throne and promptly exiles Ammar. Ammar travels to Ragosa, accompanying the former concubine of Almalik I, Zabira. Zabira hopes to overthrow Almalik II and install her own son on the throne of Cartada.

Meanwhile, a group of Valledans brutally attacks a village outside the walls of Fezana. Jaddite Captain Rodrigo Belmonte halts the slaughter, leading to the death of a member of the powerful de Rada family. As a result, Rodrigo is exiled by King Ramiro of Valledo. Rodrigo and Jehane also make their way to Ragosa.

Rodrigo, Ammar, and Jehane meet in the court of King Badir of Ragosa. Ammar and Rodrigo are hired as mercenaries, and Jehane as a physician. Zabira asks Badir to support her son’s claim to the throne of Cartada. Badir eventually agrees to go to war against Cartada. As the story progresses, Jehane develops a platonic friendship with Rodrigo and a romance with Ammar. Ammar and Rodrigo also befriend one another despite their different religions and cultures.

The Jaddites begin a holy war against the Asharite city-states, in a rough parallel to the campaigns of the Reconquista. To the south of Al-Rassan, in the Majriti Desert, the Muwardis practice a stricter version of the Asharite religion. The brother of Almalik II convinces the Muwardis to intervene in the affairs of Al-Rassan, both to repel the Jaddites and to cleanse the Asharite lands of their impious leaders.

Unrest in Fezana leads to a massacre of Kindath citizens. Jehane, Ammar, and Rodrigo arrive in Fezana in time to rescue Jehane’s parents. Outside the city, they meet King Ramiro. A Muwardi ambush injures Diego, the son of Rodrigo Belmonte. Jehane’s father performs emergency surgery to save his life.

King Ramiro proposes to begin a conquest of not only the Asharite city-states, but also of the other two Jaddite kingdoms. He hopes to form a united Esperañan government over the whole peninsula. Rodrigo Belmonte is promoted to constable of Valledo. Rodrigo offers to become co-constable with Ammar. Ammar refuses, placing his loyalty to Cartada above his friendship with Rodrigo. Ammar and Jehane leave together. Ammar becomes leader of the Cartadan army. War spreads across the peninsula. Ammar and Rodrigo face each other in single combat before a battle. One man kills the other, though the narrative does not immediately reveal which man is the victor.

In an epilogue, news arrives that Cartada has been conquered, placing the whole peninsula under Esperaña’s control. Rodrigo has been buried in a place of honor, and his epitaph is a line from Ammar’s poetry. Ammar composes a lament for the lost Al-Rassan while his wife Jehane listens.

== Major themes ==
The interplay between bigotry and tolerance is a major theme of the novel. The stories of the main characters are interwoven in such a way that each is responsible for saving the lives of persons who are loved by the others. The surgery to save Diego Belmonte is seen as a key event: "In this scene, the son of a Jaddite warleader is saved through an Asharite's warning and a Kindath's medical skill; it hints at the possibility of peaceful interaction among the three embattled religious groups." The possibility of cooperation between people of different faith is glimpsed as an ideal that leads to the miraculous, in this case an extraordinary act of surgery. It is in the Epilogue, in the Kindath city of Sorenica, rebuilt after its destruction by Jaddites at the outset of their holy war, where the possibilities of co-existence are realized.

The uses and misuses of religion for political ends are also demonstrated in the novel, with rulers and clergy using religion to manipulate the people and their leaders into desired courses of action.

The definition of civilization and the search for the attributes of a civilized society in a hard divided world is another theme of the novel. Kay characterizes the relatively liberal and tolerant Asharite city of Ragosa or the Kindath city of Sorenica as places of civilization. Silvenes, the capital of the former Khalifate of Al-Rassan, now ruined and largely abandoned, is seen wistfully as the symbol of civilization lost. In contrast, the cruder Jaddite cities of Esperaña with their increasing military power and the ascetic desert communities of the Muwardi Asharites are places with fewer of the attributes of civilization.

While Kay presents war and conquest with an air of nobility and grandeur, the novel also constantly reminds the reader of the real price of war paid in bloodshed, loss and grief.

== Awards ==
- Geffen Award (Translated Fantasy Books) nominee, 2005
