= Comparison of photogrammetry software =

Photogrammetry is the technique to extract geometric information from two-dimensional images or video.

== Comparison of notable packages ==
Application	License	Platform	Standalone / plugin	Automatic modelling	Scalability	Type of photogrammetry	Data source	Inception	Vendor / creator	Guide price	Online service	Free tier or trial period
3DF Zephyr	Proprietary	Microsoft Windows	Standalone	Yes	Yes, multiple images	Aerial, close-range, UAS	Images, video, laser scan	2013	3DFLOW	Free-US$4,200	No	Yes, Free Edition and Free Trial
3Dsurvey	Proprietary	Microsoft Windows	Standalone	Yes	Yes, multiple images	Aerial, close-range, UAV, terrestrial	Images, video, LiDAR, SLAM, bathymetry	2014	3Dsurvey d.o.o.	225€–3.399€, student license FREE	Yes 3Dsurvey Cloud (requires license)	Yes Fully-functional 14-day free trial, no credit card needed.
Ames Stereo Pipeline	Apache v2	Linux and OSX	Standalone	Yes	Yes, can run on a cluster in parallel	Satellite, aerial, close-range	Images		NASA		No	
IMAGINE Photogrammetry	Proprietary	Microsoft Windows	Standalone	Semi-automatic	Yes, multiple images	Aerial, satellite, UAS	Images	2009	Hexagon Geospatial	Unknown		
Metashape (former PhotoScan)	Proprietary	Linux, macOS, Microsoft Windows	Standalone	Yes	Yes, multiple images, cluster distributed processing	Aerial, close-range, UAS, satellite	Images, video, laser scan	2010	Agisoft	$179–3,499 educational $59–549, $4/hour on GeoCloud, Free Demo mode, Free Trial mode	Yes Agisoft Cloud (requires license)	Yes Unlimited featured 30 days trial or free demo mode with limited features.
OpenDroneMap	AGPLv3	Linux, macOS, Microsoft Windows	Standalone	Yes	Yes, multiple images	Aerial, close-range, UAS	Images, video	2013	OpenDroneMap	Free	No	
PhotoModeler	Proprietary	Microsoft Windows	Standalone	Yes	Yes, multiple images	Aerial, close-range, UAS	Images, video, laser scan	1994	Eos Systems - PhotoModeler	$995-$2995 or from $49/month, edu discounts		Yes Free no-save demo mode, or free 30 day all features trial.
Photosynth	Unknown	Microsoft Windows	Standalone	No	Yes, multiple images	Close-range	Images	2008	Microsoft Live Labs, University of Washington	Free		
Pix4Dmapper	Proprietary	Linux, macOS, Microsoft Windows	Standalone	Yes	Yes, multiple images	Aerial, close-range, UAS	Images, video	2011	Pix4D	License from $350/month	Pix4D Cloud	New customers are entitled to 25 days of free access to Pix4Dmapper.
Qlone	Proprietary	iOS, Android, macOS	Standalone	Yes	Yes, multiple images	Aerial, close-range, UAS	Images	2017	EyeCue Vision Technologies LTD.	Free Demo mode	No	
RealityCapture	Proprietary	Microsoft Windows	Standalone	Yes	Yes, multiple images	Aerial, close-range, UAS	Images, video, laser scans	2014	Capturing Reality	Free - US$1,250 a year		
SOCET SET	Proprietary	Microsoft Windows	Standalone	No	Yes, multiple images	Aerial, close-range, satellite	Images		BAE Systems	Unknown		

== See also ==
- MicMac (software)
- PCI Geomatica
- Bundle adjustment software
- Structure from motion software
