= Qlone =

3D scanning app

- Developer: EyeCue Vision Technologies Ltd
- Initial release: June 15, 2017; 8 years ago
- Operating system: iOS 13.0 or later, Android 7.0 or later, macOS 12.0 or later, watchOS 7.0 or later
- Available in: 17 languages
- List of languages English, Arabic, Danish, Dutch, French, German, Hebrew, Italian, Japanese, Korean, Norwegian Bokmål, Portuguese, Russian, Simplified Chinese, Spanish, Traditional Chinese, Turkish
- Type: 3D scanning and editing
- License: Proprietary
- Website: Official website

Qlone is a 3D scanning app based on photogrammetry for creation of 3D models on mobile devices. The resultant 3D models can be exported for external use.

Qlone was featured at the Apple Worldwide Developers Conference in 2021. It was also featured on BBC Click.

== Qlone features ==
=== 3D scanning ===
3D scanning with Qlone requires the use of an included mat design. The user prints the mat onto a sheet of paper, then places the object to be scanned in the centre of the mat. An augmented reality dome within the Qlone app guides the user through the subsequent scanning process. The iOS version of Qlone allows scanning without the mat.

=== 3D editing ===
Qlone's editing features allow users to adjust 3D scanned models using texture mapping, polygon mesh size simplification, digital sculpting, cleaning and smoothing, and artistic effects.

=== File export ===
Qlone exports directly to multiple 3D platforms including SketchFab, i.materialise, Lens Studio for Snapchat, Shapeways and CGTrader. Models can also be exported in different 3D formats for use in other 3D tools – OBJ, STL, FBX, USDZ, GLB (Binary gLTF), PLY, and X3D.

3D Face Capture with the Qlone App

== Use in Science, Education and Academia ==
Due to its inexpensive, simple and accessible nature for creating 3D models, Qlone was used in many academically educational and scientific research projects.

The European Space Agency used Qlone to scan rocks in a Tele-Robotic rock collection experiment.

Neurosurgeons from the University of Southern California and surgeons from Tulane University School of Medicine used Qlone to create 3D models of cadaveric specimens and anatomical models with the aim of increasing access to such components for enhancing anatomy training and allowing realistic surgical simulations for neurosurgeons and practitioners worldwide.

Archaeologists from Texas A&M University used Qlone to create 3D replicas of artifacts and models and students from Vancouver iTech Preparatory Middle School used Qlone to create 3D scans of more than 100 artifacts from Fort Vancouver National Historic Site.

== See also ==
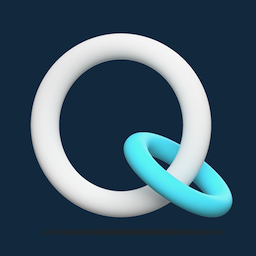
Logo of the Qlone app

- Procreate
- Blender
- Unity
- Cinema4D
- SketchFab
- 3DF Zephyr
- Metashape
- RealityCapture
- Comparison of photogrammetry software
