= 3D selfie =

3D-printed scale replica of a person

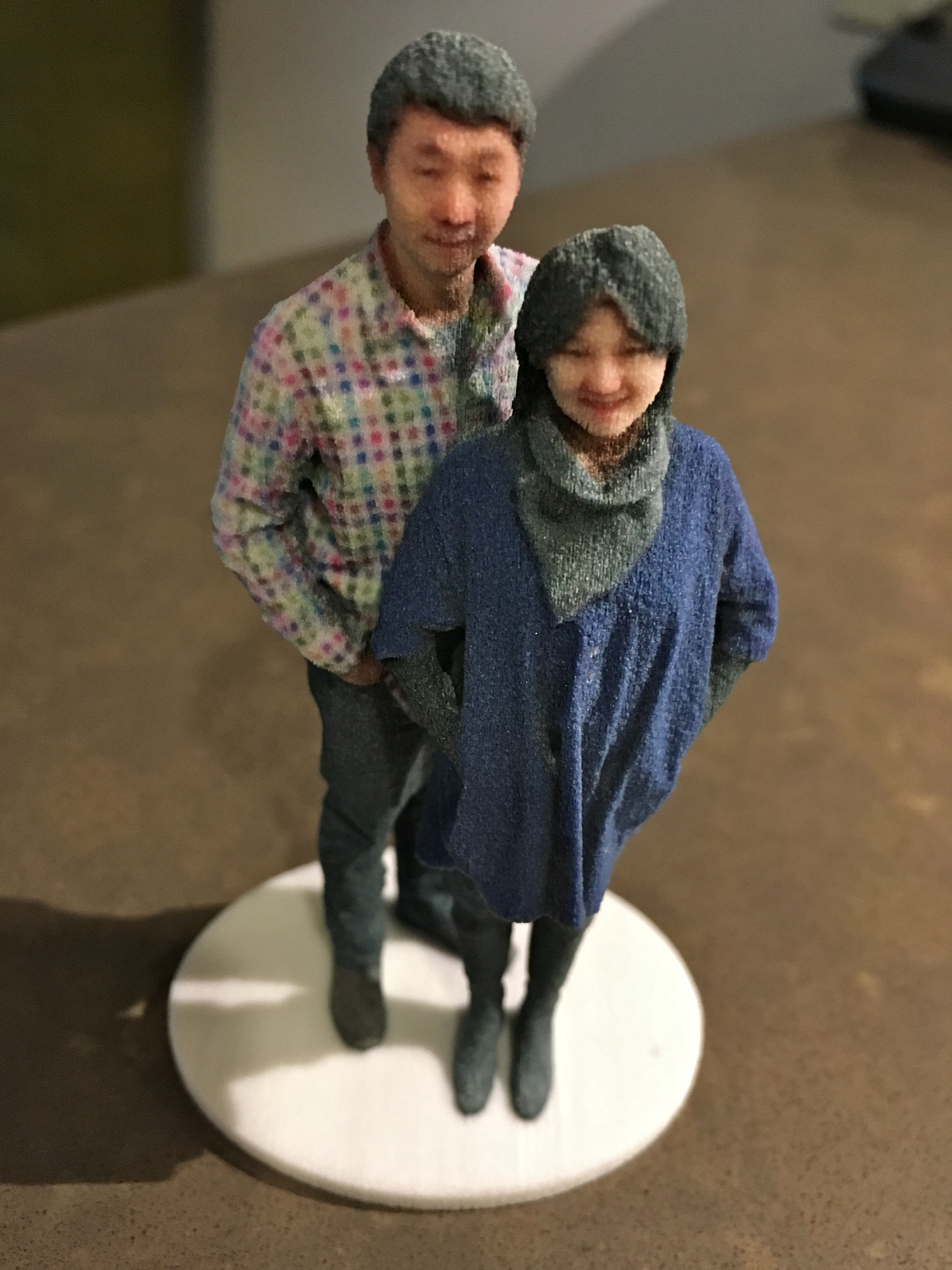
A 3D selfie in 1:20 scale

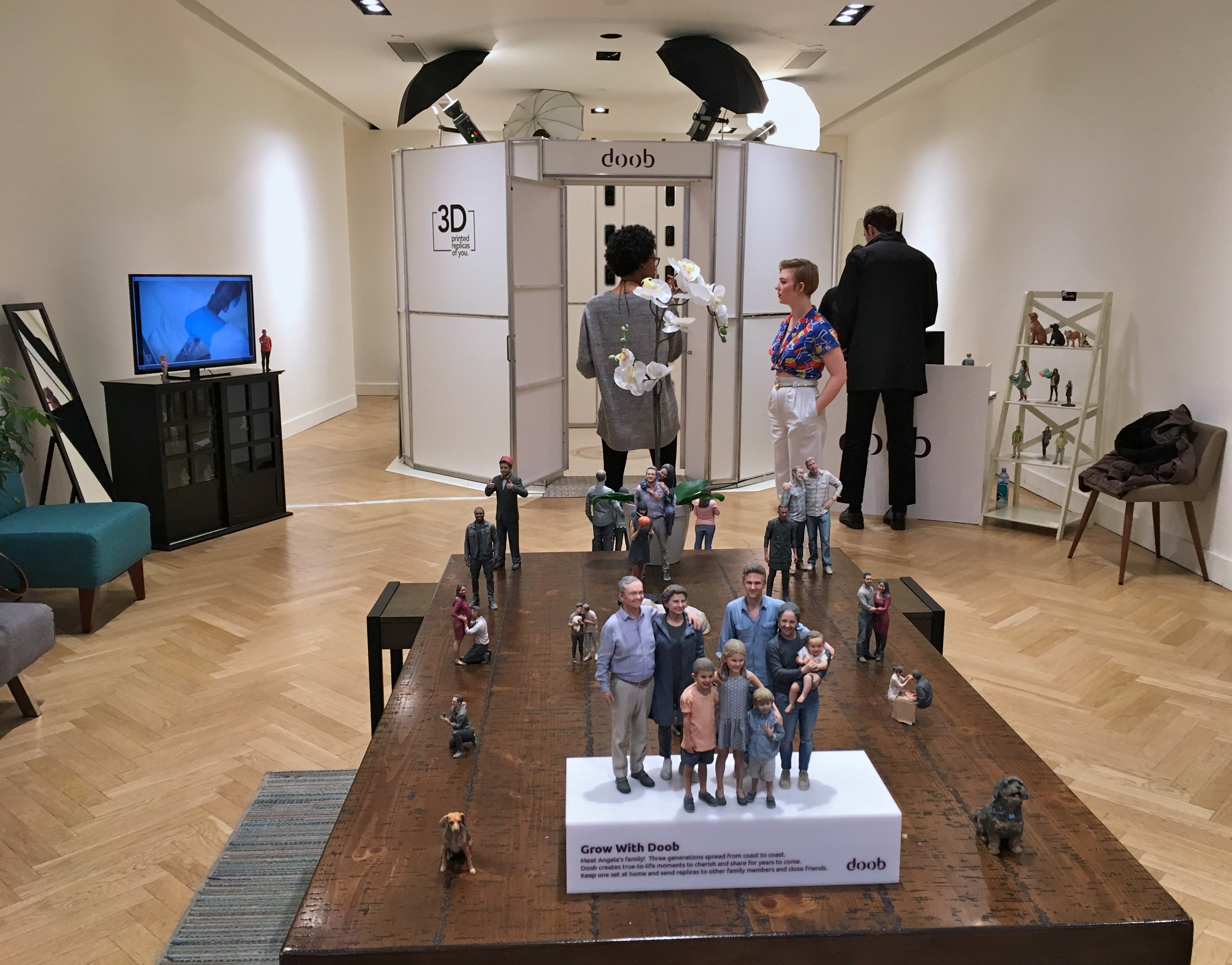
Doob NY SOHO 3D selfie photo booth IMG 4948 FRD

A 3D selfie is a 3D-printed scale replica of a person or their face. These three-dimensional selfies are also known as 3D portraits, 3D figurines, 3D-printed figurines, mini-me figurines and miniature statues. In 2014 a first 3D printed bust of a President, Barack Obama, was made. 3D-digital-imaging specialists used handheld 3D scanners to create an accurate representation of the President.

== Description ==
The capture of a subject as a 3D model can be accomplished in many ways. One of the methods, is called photogrammetry. Many systems use one or more digital cameras to take 2D pictures of the subject, under normal lighting, under projected light patterns, or a combination of these. Inexpensive systems use a single camera which is moved around the subject in 360° at various heights, over minutes, while the subject stays immobile. More elaborate systems have a vertical bar of cameras rotate around the subject, usually achieving a full scan in 10 seconds. Most expensive systems have an enclosed 3D photo booth with 50 to 100 cameras statically embedded in walls and the ceiling, firing all at once, eliminating differences in image capture caused by movements of the subject. A piece of software then reconstructs a 3D model of the subject from these pictures. One of the 3D photo booth, which creates life-like portraits, is called Veronica Chorographic Scanner. The scanner participated in the project of Royal Academy of Arts, where people could have themselves scanned. The scanner utilized 8 cameras taking 96 photographs of a person from each angle. Photogrammetry scanning is generally considered more life-like, than scanning with 3D scanners. Mobile based Photogrammetry apps such as Qlone can also be used for 3D capturing a person.

Another method for capturing a 3D selfie uses dedicated 3D scanning equipment which may more accurately capture geometry and texture, but take longer to perform. Scanners may be handheld, tripod mounted or fitted to another system that will allow the full geometry of a person to be captured. One of the well-known full body 3D scanners are Shapify booth, based on Artec Eva 3D scanners, Cobra body scanner by PICS-3D and Twindom Twinstant Mobile.

Production of 3D selfies is enabled by 3D printing technologies. This includes the ability to 3D print in full color using gypsum-based binder jetting techniques, giving the figurine a sandstone-like texture and look. Other 3D printing process may be used depending on the desired result.

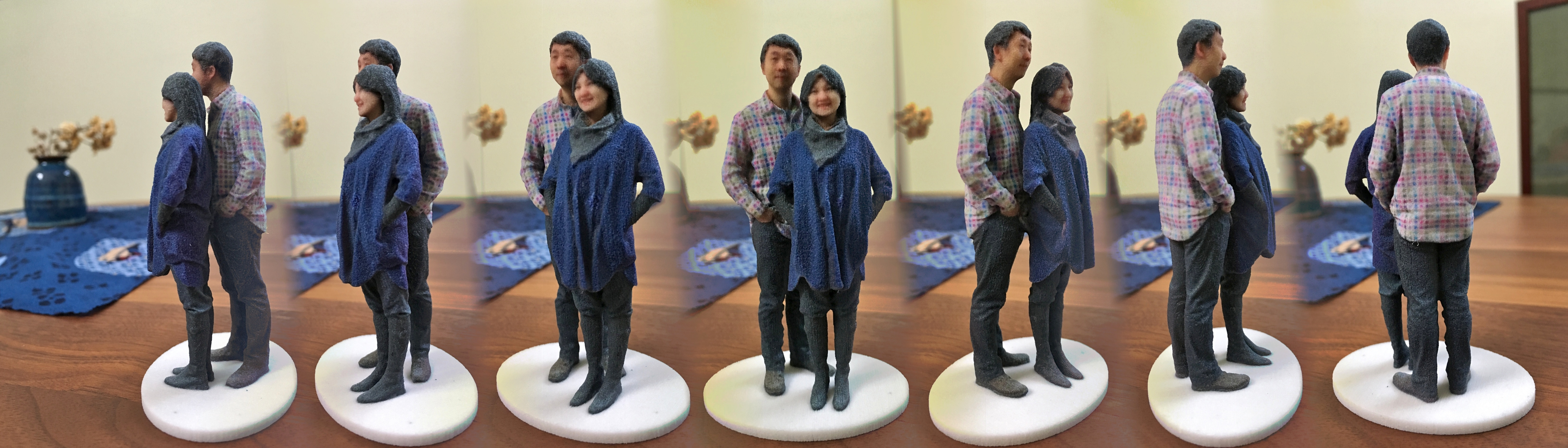
A 3D selfie seen from various angles

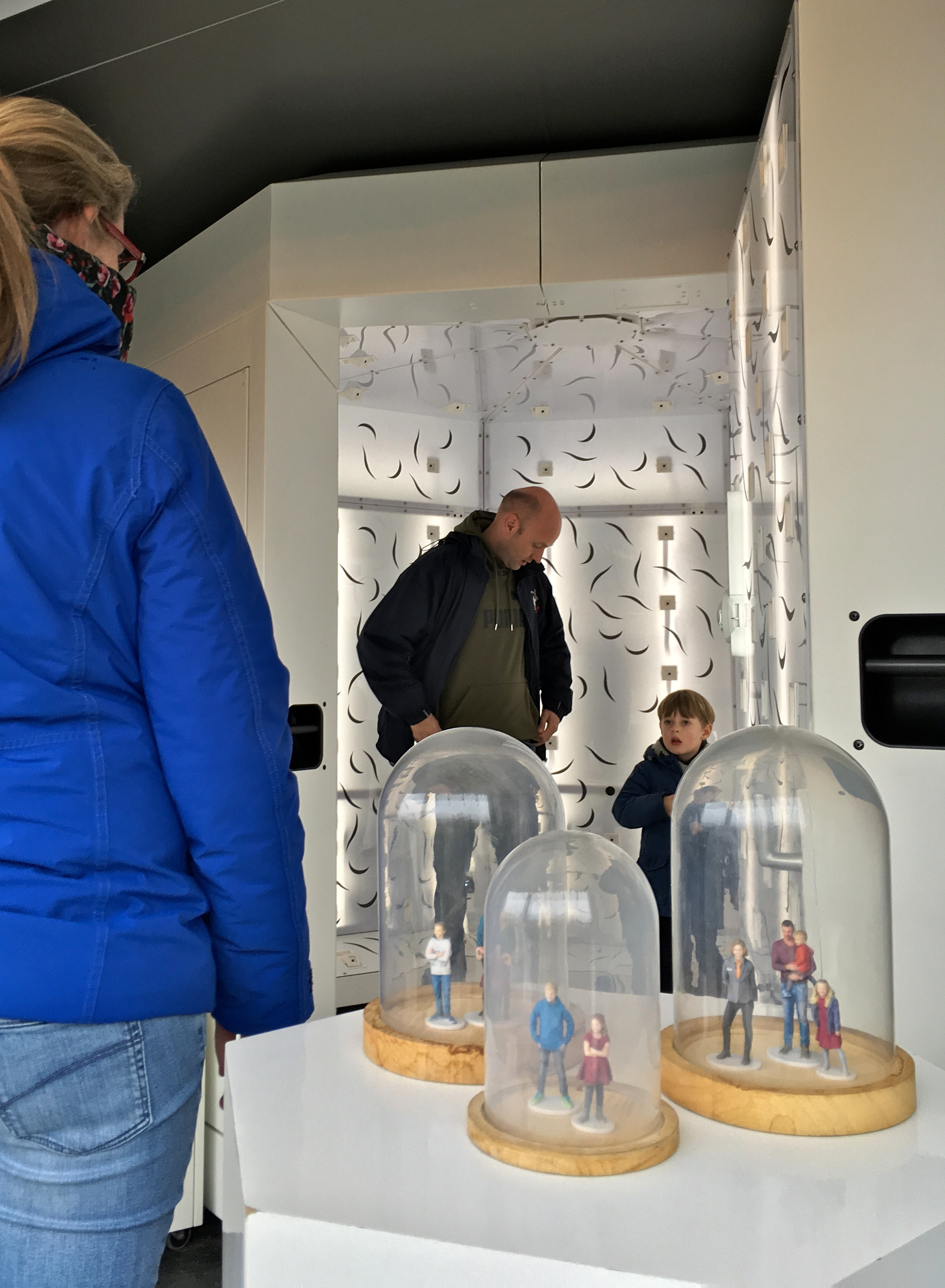
Fantasitron 3D photo booth at Madurodam

3D Face Capture using the Qlone app

== See also ==
- 3D reconstruction
- Digitization
- Depth map
- Full body scanner
- Photogrammetry
- Range imaging
