= MicMac (software) =

Open source software for photogrammetry

- Repository: github.com/micmacIGN/micmac
- Written in: C++
- License: CeCILL-B

MicMac is an open-source software for photogrammetry developed by the French National Geographic Institute.

== See also ==
- Comparison of photogrammetry software
