= PhotoModeler =

Software application

- Screenshot of PhotoModeler
- Developer: Eos Systems Inc.
- Release: 1994; 32 years ago
- Operating system: Microsoft Windows
- Type: Photogrammetry
- License: Proprietary commercial software
- Website: www.photomodeler.com

PhotoModeler is a software application that performs image-based modeling and close range photogrammetry – producing 3D models and measurements from photography. The software is used for close-range, aerial and uav photogrammetry.

Close Range Photogrammetry (CRP) can mean photographs taken from the ground with a handheld camera, or taken from a UAV/drone at a relatively low altitude. PhotoModeler and CRP are used for performing measurement and modeling in agriculture, archaeology, architecture, biology, engineering, fabrication, film production, forensics, mining, stockpile volumes, etc.

== How Photomodeler works ==
1) Take photos from different angles: Ensure that many images are taken to capture the entire object. The amount of required images varies accordingly to the size and complexity of the object being captured.

2) Load images into Photomodeler software: Upload the images by any means on to the computer.

3) Chose the method: Chose one amongst the four following options.

- Manual marking: Marking and Referencing is the process of manually matching common features across multiple photos. Click on a distinct visual feature on one photo and match it to the same feature on other photos taken from different angles.
- Coded target detection: Photomodeler automatically detects applied or projected targets and solves for an accurate set of 3D points representing each target center. Coded targets provide the additional ability to reference targets between photos. The resulting points can be used for line, curve and surface modeling (and Surface Draw), or measurement and export as needed.
- Smartmatch/ DSM: Dense surface modeling tools are used to automatically detect and match features across multiple overlapping photos. The result is a dense point cloud that can optionally be triangulated/surfaced to form the shape. Projects built with DSM tools can be supplemented with traditional modeling features, such as points and lines.
- Smartmatch/ DSM-Aerial: Photomodeler UAS uses SmartMatch to automatically detect common features across overlapping aerial photos, allowing DMS to generate 3D point cloud models and surfaces. Models can be enhanced with wireframe line-work, ortho-photos, contours, volumes, geo-referencing, and more.

4) Review, measure, and export

== Applications ==
Some of the applications of PhotoModeler are:

- Accident reconstruction / Forensics
- Archaeology / Paleontology
- Architecture
- Biology
- Engineering
- Fabrication and Manufacturing
- Film
- Mining
- Situational Awareness (SA)

== See also ==
- Stereophotogrammetry
- 3D data acquisition and object reconstruction
- Image-based modeling and rendering
- Computer vision
- 3D scanner

== Notes and references ==
Notes

- Atkinson, K.B. (1996). Close Range Photogrammetry and Machine Vision. Latheronwheel, Scotland: Whittles Publishing. ISBN 1-870325-46-X.
- Bythell, J.; Pan, P. (2001). "Three-dimensional morphometric measurements of reef corals using underwater photogrammetry techniques". Coral Reefs. 20 (3). SpringerLink: 193–199. doi:10.1007/s003380100157. S2CID 24219007.;
- de Bruyn, P.J.N.; Bester, M.N.; Carlini, A.R.; Oosthuizen, W.C. (2009). "How to weigh an elephant seal with one finger: a simple three-dimensional photogrammetric application". Aquatic Biology. 5: 31–39. Bibcode:2009AquaB...5...31D. doi:10.3354/ab00135. hdl:2263/12817.
- Dunn, Maynard (2009). "RECENT DEVELOPMENTS IN CLOSE RANGE PHOTOGRAMMETRY FOR MINING AND RECLAMATION" (PDF).
- Duesing, Brett (2006). "Q&A: Pushing Visual Limits of 3D". Cadalyst Magazine.
- Grande, Joseph (July 2006). "3D Part Inspection Is a Snapshot Away". Plastics Technology.
- Karara, H.M. (1989). Non-Topographic Photogrammetry (2nd ed.). Falls Church, VA, USA: American Society for Photogrammetry and Remote Sensing. ISBN 0-944426-10-7.
- Luhmann, Thomas; Robson; Kyle; Harley (2006). Close Range Photogrammetry: Principles, Methods and Applications. Dunbeath, Scotland: Whittles Publishing. ISBN 1-870325-50-8.
- Matthews, N. A. (2008). "Aerial and Close-Range Photogrammetric Technology: Providing Resource Documentation, Interpretation, and Preservation" (PDF). Denver, Colorado: U.S. Department of the Interior, Bureau of Land Management, National Operations Center. p. 42.
- McGlone, Chris (2004). Manual of Photogrammetry (5th ed.). Bethesda, MD, USA: American Society for Photogrammetry and Remote Sensing. ISBN 1-57083-071-1.
- Richardson, Shawn (2008). "Using Photo Modeling to Obtain the Modes of a Structure" (PDF). Sound and Vibration.
- "Police Take Accident Reconstruction To Skies: Photogrammetry Animation Can Be Used In Court". The Boston Channel. 2008.
- Schwartz, J (2011). Thomas, John Tudor; Desjardins, Daniel D.; Güell, Jeff J.; Bernier, Kenneth L. (eds.). "Precise positioning surveillance in 3-D using night-vision stereoscopic photogrammetry". Display Technologies and Applications for Defense, Security, and Avionics - V. Display Technologies and Applications for Defense, Security, and Avionics V; and Enhanced and Synthetic Vision 2011. 8042. S.P.I.E.: 80420A. Bibcode:2011SPIE.8042E..0AS. doi:10.1117/12.884597. S2CID 120636502.
