= PCI Geomatica =

Software for earth observation data

PCI Geomatica is a remote sensing and photogrammetry desktop software package for processing earth observation data, designed by the PCI Geomatics company. The latest version of the software is Geomatica 2018. Geomatica is aimed primarily at faster data processing and allows users to load satellite and aerial imagery where advanced analysis can be performed. Geomatica has been used by many educational institutions and scientific programs throughout the world to analyze satellite imagery and trends, such as the GlobeSAR Program, a program which was carried out by the Canada Centre for Remote Sensing in the 1990s.

A very popular edition of Geomatica is known as Freeview, which permits users to load multiple types of satellite images as well as geospatial data that is stored in different formats. The software is available for download over the web, and has registered several thousands of downloads.

== Image processing packages ==
Geomatica is one of several software packages available to the educational, commercial, and military users. Other similar packages include Erdas Imagine, Envi, and SocetSet (or Socet GXP). Geomatica has also been compared to Envi and Erdas Imagine as it relates to orthorectification.

== Educational institutions using Geomatica ==
Over 2,700 educational institutions worldwide have used Geomatica as part of their Remote Sensing course delivery, some of which are listed here

- University of Calgary, Geomatics Engineering program
- York University, Geomatics Engineering programs, Toronto, Ontario, Canada
- University of New Brunswick, Online Course offered on Radarsat-2 and Polarimetry
- Fleming College, Lindsay, Ontario, Canada
- Carleton University, Ottawa, Canada
- University of Waterloo, Waterloo, Ontario, Canada
- British Columbia Institute of Technology (BCIT)
- Université du Québec à Montréal, Remote Sensing course GEO8142
- Aalto University, Institute of Photogrammetry and Remote Sensing
- North Eastern University (NEU), Boston, USA
- University of Arkansas
- University of Victoria
- Fanshawe College, London, Ontario
- TU Bergakademie Freiberg, Remote Sensing Group
- Saint Mary's University (SMU), Halifax, Nova Scotia, Canada. Department of Geography and Environmental Studies
- Stellenbosch University, Department of Geography and Environmental Studies and Centre for Geographical Analysis, South Africa

== Open Geospatial Consortium ==
Geomatica includes a web coverage service interface that complies with the OGC Web Coverage Service (WCS) Interface Standard, which is a key area in which PCI Geomatics has contributed. Remote Sensing data providers distribute data in diverse formats, which makes sharing information across many different platforms challenging. WCS seeks to alleviate some of the data sharing challenges by publishing the geographic information and layers openly over the web.

== Contributions to open standards ==
Geomatica adheres to open standards to promote sharing and collaboration of earth observation data. An SDK that makes the PCIDSK file format available to the community is available.
