= Metashape =

Photogrammetry software

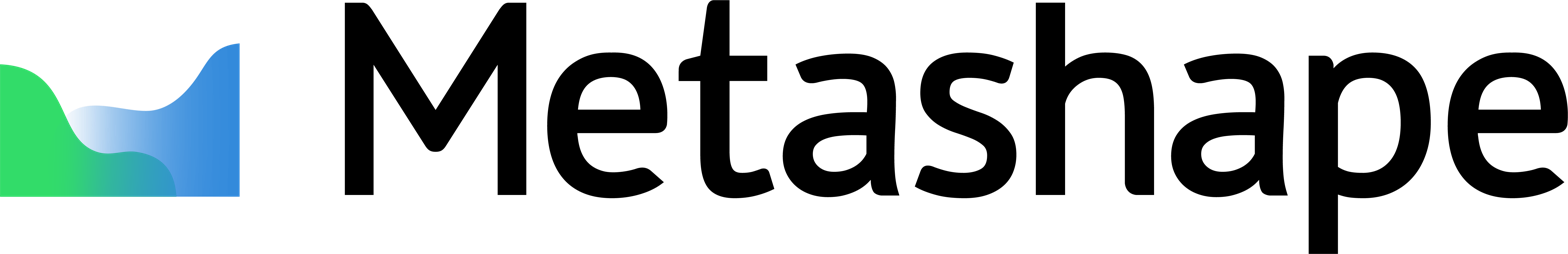
- Developer: Agisoft LLC
- Initial release: 2010
- Stable release: Version 2.1.2 build 18358 / 20 June 2024
- Operating system: Microsoft Windows; Linux macOS
- Type: 3D computer graphics software
- License: Proprietary
- Website: www.agisoft.com

Agisoft Metashape (previously known as Agisoft PhotoScan) is a tool for a photogrammetry pipeline. The software is available in Standard and Pro versions, the standard version is sufficient for interactive media tasks, while the Pro version is designed for authoring GIS content. The software is developed by Agisoft LLC located in St. Petersburg in Russia.

It is widely used by archaeologists. Many UAV companies are also using it.

It is the world's most widely used photogrammetry software, used in research. The software is sold in a perpetual version and offers extensive customization options and integration with external scripts.

The software can run on any of these operating systems: Microsoft Windows, macOS or Linux.

== Use in industry ==
#	Title	Studio	Genre	Reference
1	Unreal Engine	Epic Games	Video game	
2	Metal Gear Solid V: The Phantom Pain	Kojima Productions	Video game	
3	The Vanishing of Ethan Carter	The Astronauts	Video game	
4	War Thunder	Gaijin Entertainment	Video game	
5	Halo 4	343 Industries	Video game	
6	Cyberpunk 2077	CD Projekt Red	Video game	
7	The Talos Principle	Croteam	Video game	
8	Ryse: Son of Rome	Crytek	Video game	
9	Rustclad	Skull Theatre	Video game	
10	Chappie	Image Engine	Film	
11	Europa Report	Phosphene	Film	
12	Dracula Untold	Framestore	Film	
13	Lincoln	Framestore	Film	
14	Edge of Tomorrow	Sony Pictures Imageworks	Film	
15	Mad Max: Fury Road	Iloura	Film	
16	San Andreas	Cinesite	Film	
17	The Strain	Mr. X Inc	TV show	
18	The Knick	Phosphene	TV show	
19	Merlin	Vine	TV show	
20	Falling Skies	MastersFX	TV show	
21	Star Wars Battlefront	EA DICE	Video game	
