= RealityScan =

Photogrammetry and lidar software

- Other names: RealityCapture
- Developer: Capturing Reality (Epic Games)
- Release: February 2, 2016
- Stable release: 2.1 / November 2025
- Operating system: Microsoft Windows
- Available in: English
- Type: 3D computer graphics software
- License: Proprietary
- Website: www.realityscan.com

RealityScan (previously RealityCapture until June 2025) is a photogrammetry and lidar software developed by Slovak company Capturing Reality and later by Epic Games. It is used to create 3D models from unordered photographs or point clouds collected from terrestrial or aerial platforms.

The software is used in cultural heritage (art, archaeology, and architecture), full body scanning, gaming, surveying, mapping, visual effects (VFX), and virtual reality (VR). Its features include image registration (alignment), automatic calibration, polygon mesh calculation, coloring, texturing, parallel projections, georeferencing, digital surface model generation, coordinate system conversion, simplification, scaling, filtering, smoothing, measurement, inspection, and various import and export options. The program can be run from the command line, and a software development kit is available.

RealityCapture is able to combine camera images and laser scans. It is designed to make low demands on hardware, and works linearly, so doubling the inputs roughly doubles the processing time. The software is available only in English.

== Technical requirements ==
RealityCapture/RealityScan runs on 64-bit machines with at least 8 GB of RAM, running 64-bit Microsoft Windows 8, 8.1, 10, or 11, or Windows Server 2008 or later, with an Nvidia CUDA 3.0-capable GPU with at least 1 GB of VRAM. Users can register images without an Nvidia GPU but cannot generate textured meshes without one. Users must install the Media Feature Pack for Windows, and on Windows Server, the Media Foundation features.

Meshing, coloring, and texturing are performed out-of-core to avoid RAM performance loss during these processes.

== History ==
The public beta version of RealityCapture was released by Slovak company Capturing Reality (founded in 2013), based in Bratislava, on 2 February 2016. A closed beta had been running for almost a year prior.

Capturing Reality was acquired by Epic Games in March 2021, with Epic planning to integrate RealityCapture into the Unreal Engine.

In April 2024, Epic Games revised the pricing model, making the software free for individuals, educators, students, and companies with annual gross revenue under US$1 million.

Epic Games released RealityCapture 1.5 in November 2024, adding improved texturing performance, optional disabling of watertight meshing, relative file paths, and expanded command-line automation.

In June 2025, Epic Games rebranded the desktop application from RealityCapture to RealityScan, unifying it with the existing RealityScan mobile app released in 2022. RealityScan 2.0 introduced AI-assisted masking, alignment improvements, visual quality inspection tools, and support for airborne LiDAR scans. RealityScan 2.1, released in November 2025, added support for SLAM (Simultaneous Localization and Mapping) scanner data and improvements to UV unwrapping and render cameras.
