= Shadow Complex =

2009 video game

- XBLA cover art
- Developer: Chair Entertainment
- Publishers: Microsoft Game Studios; Epic Games (Remastered)
- Director: Donald Mustard
- Programmers: Donald Mustard; Ron O'Hara; Joshua Andersen
- Artists: Jared Trulock; Nathan Trewartha; Michael Low; Bert Lewis; Orlando Barrowes
- Writer: Peter David
- Engine: Unreal Engine 3
- Platforms: Xbox 360; Microsoft Windows; Xbox One; PlayStation 4; OS X
- Release: August 19, 2009: Xbox 360; WW: August 19, 2009 Remastered Microsoft Windows; WW: December 3, 2015 Xbox One; WW: March 16, 2016 PlayStation 4; WW: May 3, 2016; NA: August 19, 2016 (disc) Mac (OSX); WW: August 4, 2016
- Genre: Metroidvania
- Mode: Single-player

Shadow Complex is a Metroidvania video game developed by Chair Entertainment in association with Epic Games and published by Microsoft Game Studios for the Xbox 360 in 2009.

The game follows Jason and his girlfriend Claire, out to explore some caverns. When Claire goes missing, he finds a massive underground complex with soldiers and high-end technology. Jason must rescue Claire and discover the plot behind the faction operating the complex. Inspired by the Metroid series, the player in Shadow Complex controls Jason as he explores through the underground complex, defeating hostile forces, and finding various power-ups that enable further exploration of the complex. The game is based on the setting of Empire by Orson Scott Card, with Peter David brought in to write the script for the game.

Shadow Complex's reception has been positive. It has received and been nominated for several Game of the Year and Editor's Choice Awards. Critics praised the gameplay, narrative and graphics, with several reviewers stating that it was fairly priced. It also is considered as a leading game that revitalized the Metroidvania genre through indie games. It broke sales records for Xbox Live Arcade titles, selling over 200,000 units within the first week of release and as of year-end 2011, has sold over 600,000 copies. A remastered version was released for Microsoft Windows in December 2015, for Xbox One in March 2016 and for PlayStation 4 in May 2016. A limited physical printing of 7,500 for the PlayStation 4 was released on August 19, 2016 through Limited Run Games.

== Gameplay ==
Shadow Complex uses a 2.5D design, with the player moving about levels like a side-scrolling video game but required to dispatch enemies in three dimensions.

Shadow Complex is presented in 2.5D format; the game world is three-dimensional, but the player can only move in two dimensions, simulating the environment of a side-scrolling video game. Enemies can, however, move in any direction, and auto-aim is utilized to allow the player to fire at nearby enemies or objects both inside and outside of the 2D plane. The player can use the right control stick to aim with a laser sight. Gameplay in Shadow Complex was inspired by Super Metroid and Castlevania: Symphony of the Night. The gameplay takes many cues from Metroid: the player can move freely throughout the expansive game world, defeating enemies with a variety of weapons, and as they overcome challenges, new abilities and weapons are gained which allow to reach new areas.

The game rewards the player with experience points as they complete objectives and defeat enemies. The player can gain experience levels, each level boosting basic attributes of the character. These experience levels grant the player skills such as improved gunfire precision or damage resistance. Special rewards such as revealing the full map and unlimited special ammo are granted at specific levels. When the player starts a new game, they will lose all the weapons and items that they have acquired, but will keep the character's experience level and any benefits they have already received.

In addition to the main campaign, a number of challenge levels called "Proving Grounds" are available, generally requiring the player to make it to the exit of a room using a limited set of items and health. Players are ranked based on time of completion and any scoring objectives when they complete the level. Scores and other statistics from the main campaign and the training group are tracked via online leaderboards.

== Plot ==
Epic Games indicated during an E3 interview that the game runs parallel to the events in the Orson Scott Card novel Empire, and that the game will dovetail with the sequel to the book Hidden Empire. Empire is a Chair-owned intellectual property that was licensed to Orson Scott Card to create a series of novels, though Card did not work on the game itself.

Jason Fleming (voiced by Nolan North) and his new girlfriend Claire (voiced by Eliza Jane Schneider) are backpacking in the mountains when they come across some caverns. Claire opts to explore them, saying she used to go there as a child, but when she does not respond to Jason's calls, he follows her. He comes across a massive underground complex manned by numerous soldiers with high-end technology. He manages to follow men dragging Claire through the complex and is able to rescue her. Both have heard discussion among the soldiers about their group, the Progressive Restoration, which appears to be ready to launch attacks across the United States. Jason escorts Claire to the entrance to allow her to contact authorities, while he uses stolen high-tech devices to further infiltrate the complex and learn more.

In the complex's control room, Jason meets Commander Lucius (voiced by Graham McTavish), the leader of the Restoration, who reveals a long-term goal of inciting a civil war in the United States, allowing their group to take control. Lucius further reveals that they have already assassinated the Vice President of the United States, and are planning to launch an airship to attack San Francisco, California. Jason destroys the airship using the Restoration's nuclear missile platforms, and corners Lucius before he can escape. Furious, Lucius threatens Jason and his loved ones, declaring that the Restoration will kill everyone he has known. When Jason prepares to kill him, Lucius is shot in the head by Claire, who has arrived by a helicopter. She reveals to Jason that she is with the National Security Agency, and that she was investigating the Restoration. Claire had gotten romantically close to Jason after identifying him as a person capable of completing the infiltration of the base. Initially appalled by her deception, Jason departs the area with Claire.

The story is continued in the novel Empire, in which the President of the United States is dead and the civil war is about to start. A non-canonical ending is available midway through the game, where Jason can escape the complex and leave Claire to her fate.

== Development ==
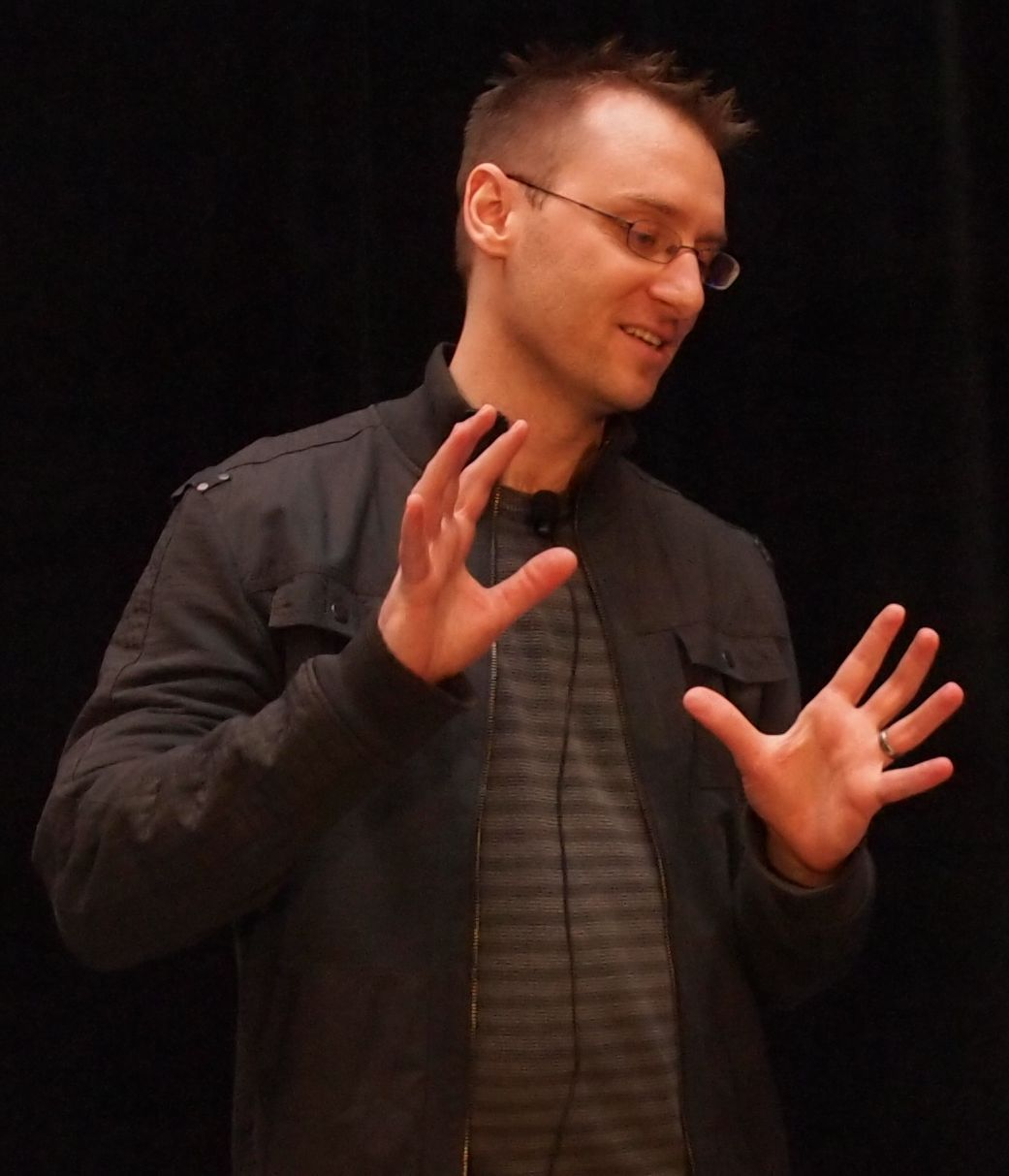
Donald Mustard, creative director at Chair, at the 2011 Game Developers Conference

Chair Entertainment's creative director Donald Mustard stated that much of Shadow Complex is based around the gameplay of Super Metroid, a game he considers "the pinnacle of 2D game design". Much of their effort was in creating the Metroid-style of gameplay, a first for their company. The first month of development was spent having the team replaying the various Metroid games in order to establish the language and concepts of such games for development in order to expand on enjoyable sections while avoiding the mistakes of these games. Chair's design process started by drawing out the game's world on graph paper, using the concepts of tile-based games to craft out the world, despite the final game not being tile-based. This process set certain rules, such as how high the character may jump with the various upgrades or how far the character must run before a certain power would activate. They played out the game on this paper map to make sure that all parts of the game were possible to complete. Such a map was used to help with the game's pacing, making sure that the player's interest in the game would remain despite the acquisition of more and more powerups.

Roughly six months into development, they recognized that their initial selected jump height was too large and did not fit with the game, forcing the team to redesign the map with a smaller jump height; Mustard noted this was one of the few changes they made that "hurt" but was caught early enough in the process to be repaired. The team had to consider the impact of the variety of power-ups they wanted to include, made more complex by their desire to have the power-ups usable anywhere. For example, while other games would specifically limit the use of a hookshot to specific surfaces, Chair's developers sought to have their tool usable on any surface, and had to consider all the potentially game-breaking routes that would be created by introducing the tool too early. Several iterations of this paper map were performed, though Mustard noted that about 85% of their original design remained in the final map. With a brush stroke tool within the Unreal Engine, they were able to build out their drawn map into the 3D computer engine, using a cylinder to represent the player. After working on tightening the feel of the player's movement controls with the simplistic map, they began prototyping the rest of the game.

Though the game is directly influenced by Metroid, the development team had to alter some of the series' principles due to the non-tile nature of the game. Mustard noted that many players in the Metroid games would "bomb every square" to discover secret areas, but this would not translate to Shadow Complex. Instead, they relied on the use of lighting to focus the player's attention on certain areas, and created the flashlight tool in the game in order to highlight such secrets when illuminated. They further used lighting and a low depth of field to reduce the amount of perspective in the game's 3D view to allow key features of the game world to stand out for the player without sacrificing the 3D nature of the game.

The developers at Chair used iterations on hand-drawn maps to plot out the world that the player would explore in Shadow Complex.

Much of the game's 18-month development time was focused on the game's controls and making sure they worked, as Mustard believed that without controls that "feel sweet", the game would have been poorly received. This included the incorporation of weapon aiming through the right thumbstick and other tactical elements such as firing from cover from games such as Gears of War. With the game being published by Microsoft Studios, the development team had access to the Microsoft play testers, who helped to identify other problem areas with their original level design. This led to the development of the option to show a blue line on the game's map that would show the player where to go next. Mustard realized there was both a benefit and downside to this feature, as it would help guide players that were stuck, but at the same time, players could become too dependent on the line and follow it exactly, giving them no challenge in exploring the game's world. To counter this, they had the line show the general path that needed to be taken but included parts of their world where the player would be forced to deviate from the suggested path in order to work around an obstacle or collect a required power-up.

Mustard believed the minimalistic story approach in Super Metroid to be ideal, and while he considered the narrative story presented in Metroid Fusion to be an obvious extension, felt it was too detailed. Thus, the development team chose to use minimal dialogue, aiming to allow the story to be pushed forward through the setting and design of the game. Shadow Complex's story further arose from the development team's common love of the cartoon G.I. Joe, pitting heroes against enemies with advanced technology. As Mustard and others at Chair had worked with Orson Scott Card during the development of Advent Rising, they approached him for feedback on the story they had been considering for the game. Card offered the idea of a faction of the United States that wanted to create a more imperialistic government, which fit well with Chair's initial concept. Card, enthralled with the idea, licensed the literary rights from Chair and proceeded to write Empire, fleshing out the story beyond the framework that Shadow Complex would fit in, while Chair completed work on its previous game Undertow. Once Chair was ready to begin work on Shadow Complex, they approached comic book writer Peter David to create the backstory for the game that would run parallel to the events in Card's novel. Developed under the working titles Empire and Empire: Alpha Complex, little was revealed during this time, with speculation that the game would be a first-person shooter. Mustard cited David's ability to remain creative when certain events were already scripted—in this case, the events of Empire and its sequel Hidden Empire—as a key asset towards the game's story.

== Reception ==
Reception

Aggregate scores
Aggregator	Score
GameRankings	X360: 89%
Metacritic	X360: 88/100; XONE: 74/100; PS4: 80/100

Review scores
Publication	Score
1Up.com	B
Edge	7/10
Eurogamer	9/10
GamePro	4.5/5
GameSpot	8.5/10
GameSpy	5/5
GameTrailers	8.8/10
Giant Bomb	5/5
IGN	9.4/10
Official Xbox Magazine (US)	9.0/10
TeamXbox	9.4/10
X-Play	5/5

Shadow Complex has been met with positive reviews and has been nominated for or received several Game of the Year, E3, and Editor's Choice Awards. IGN has given the game a 9.4 out of 10, stating it to be one of the best games of the year, specifically praising its lasting appeal and graphics, though having minor issue with the sometimes "frustrating" aiming. Ars Technica gave it the verdict "Buy", stating that Shadow Complex "may be one of the best games of the season" and that it "is a must-play for those looking for a classic twist on a fresh challenge." Giant Bomb's Jeff Gerstmann has given the game 5 stars out of 5, writing "the quality of Shadow Complex makes it well worth its $15 price tag." The publication later named the game as its Xbox 360 game of the year. As of year-end 2010, Shadow Complex has sold over 532,000 copies.

X-Play gave the game a 5 out of 5. GamePro gave the game 4.5 stars out of 5, calling the game proof "that DLC doesn't have to stand for 'disappointingly little content.'" TeamXbox gave the game 9.4 out of 10, mentioning that "... it is great, truly great even. One of the best new games you’re going to play on your Xbox 360 this year, hands down..." Resolution Magazine has awarded the game 94%, the highest score the site awarded in 2009, describing it as "the greatest game in XBLA [Xbox Live Arcade] history." Eurogamer awarded the game 9 out of 10, commenting that "its significance might just be unfathomable." The Australian video game talk show Good Game's two reviewers gave the game both a 9/10. At the 2009 Spike Video Game Awards, Shadow Complex was awarded the Best Downloadable Game award. During the 13th Annual Interactive Achievement Awards, Shadow Complex received a nomination for "Action Game of the Year" by the Academy of Interactive Arts & Sciences. It also received a nomination for "Best Downloadable Game" at the Game Developers Choice Awards. IGN listed Shadow Complex as the top Xbox Live Arcade title of all time in lists published in 2010 and 2011.

Shortly before the game's release, some activists considered calling for a boycott of Shadow Complex due to Orson Scott Card's views on homosexuality.

Since its release, Shadow Complex has been seen as one of the early indie Metroidvanias that revitalized the genre in the late 2010s and 2020s.

=== Sales ===
Shadow Complex was the top selling Xbox Live Arcade game for the week within its release, and furthermore was one of the top ten played titles for all of Xbox Live. It also broke all sales records for Xbox Live Arcade titles, selling over 200,000 units within the first week of release. It is estimated that the game has sold nearly 490,000 units, based on leaderboard statistics, within a year of its release. That number increased to over 600,000 as of year-end 2011.

== Possible sequel and remastered version ==
Chair has considered a sequel to Shadow Complex, and had started working on development after the release of the first game. At that time, both Mustard and executives at Epic Games were considering possibilities for mobile games based on the success of spirit-based titles like Fieldrunners. Around mid-2010, about eight to nine months after the release of Shadow Complex and into the development of its sequel, Apple was preparing to announce the iPhone 4 which they said would offer enough processor power to run games using a 3D engine. Mustard got into contact with Apple with the offer to develop a game for the iPhone, and Apple allowed them to, but required completion of the title in a very short timeframe, approximately five months, as to have it ready for the iPhone release event. Because of the limited size of Chair, they could only work on one project at a time. Over one weekend, Mustard halted the development of the Shadow Complex sequel and put his team on developing Infinity Blade, which proved successful; the title had two further sequels. During this time, Mustard stated that they were stockpiling ideas for the Shadow Complex sequel after they completed Infinity Blade. Though they do not expect a sequel to perform as well as Infinity Blade, they have pledged that a sequel will be made. In a March 2016 interview, Mustard stated that the sequel's map and core game is in a playable state, but would need about a year and a half to add art assets, enemy behavior, and other mechanics needed to polish the title.

When the third Infinity Blade title was completed in September 2013, Chair was looking to return to Shadow Complex but a new opportunity came about as Apple had introduced Chair to Bad Robot, the production company of film and television director J. J. Abrams. The two companies recognized a potential game could be developed. Chair spent the next two years working on Spyjinx, which is set to be released in 2016. During 2015 as Spyjinx's development continued, Mustard recognized that Chair had grown large and mature enough to handle a second project. He opted to have part of his team create Shadow Complex Remastered, using the help of a friendly third-party studio to help port the game to the Unreal Engine 4, giving the game more realistic rendering capabilities enabled by the nature of the original game assets being developed at high resolution. Chair included keyboard and mouse controls for personal computer users and added in new melee takedown maneuvers, as these were already developed for the anticipated sequel. The Remastered version includes new achievements and Master challenges. However, Mustard did not want to add many other new features to the game, wanting to leave the game otherwise untouched for experienced players.

Shadow Complex Remastered was made available for free download on Microsoft Windows through Epic's storefront on December 3, 2015, with plans for wider Windows release on other storefronts. The Windows version was released for free during its first month; Mustard said that Chair was financially secure to enable this decision and found that through Infinity Blade that releasing the title for free would allow them to get it to as many players as possible and to see what interest there is for pursuing a sequel. The remastered version was released on Xbox One on March 16, 2016, and a PlayStation 4 version, as well as PC version offered through the Windows 10 Store and Steam on May 3, 2016.

A physical printing of the remaster was made by Limited Run Games with 7,500 copies being produced for the PlayStation 4, and was released on the distributor's website on August 19, 2016. Of the 7,500, only 6,900 were made available for sale, with the rest being given to employees of Epic Games.
