= Donald Mustard =

American video game designer

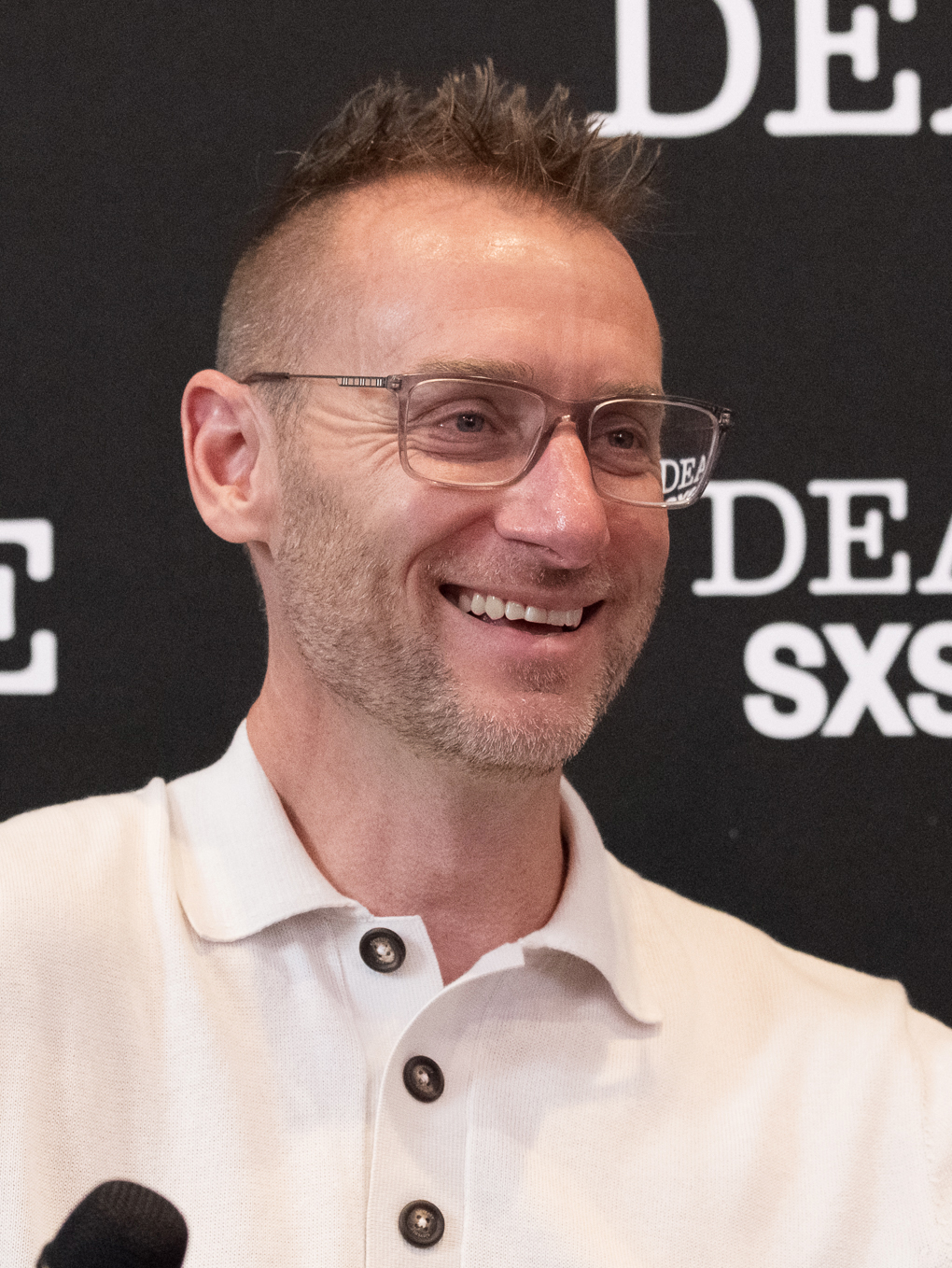
- Mustard at SXSW London 2026
- Education: Brigham Young University
- Occupations: Game designer and director
- Known for: Chief Creative Officer, Epic Games; Co-founder, Chair Entertainment
- Title: Partner, AGBO
- Spouse: Laura Mustard

Donald Mustard (born 1976) is an American video game designer, creative director, producer and writer. He is a partner at AGBO, the former Chief Creative Officer at Epic Games, and the co-founder of Chair Entertainment. He is best known as the co-creator of Fortnite and the creative director behind Shadow Complex and the Infinity Blade trilogy.

== Early life and education ==
Mustard grew up in Houston, Texas. With the intention of becoming a filmmaker, he attended Brigham Young University and graduated in 2000 with a BFA in film. As a college student, Mustard produced several short films, including Gestures, which mixed computer graphics and live action. This led to freelance work at visual effects studios such as Industrial Light & Magic, Rhythm & Hues Studios and Digital Domain.

== Career ==
After college, Mustard joined computer graphics studio GlyphX along with his brother Geremy, where he created video game cutscenes for publishers such as Eidos Interactive, Activision and Sony. While there, Mustard wrote a story that he decided would fit a video game better than a film, and convinced GlyphX to produce it. The action-adventure game, Advent Rising, was released in 2005 for Xbox and PC.

In May 2005, just prior to the release of the game, Mustard left GlyphX and founded Chair Entertainment along with his brother and Ryan Holmes, and hired several of the developers of Advent Rising. Mustard served as the creative director for the company's first game, Undertow, released in 2007. The following year, Epic Games purchased Chair. Mustard stayed on as creative director, leading the development of the platform-adventure game Shadow Complex (2009), and the Infinity Blade trilogy of mobile action role-playing games. (2010–2013). At the "Apple Special Event" in September 2010, he joined Steve Jobs on stage to demonstrate Infinity Blade (then known as "Project Sword"), which was released two months later. In November 2015, he and filmmaker J. J. Abrams announced a collaboration between Chair and Bad Robot to create a new game called Spyjinx, though it was never released.

In 2016, Mustard became the Worldwide Creative Director at Epic, which launched Fortnite Battle Royale the following year, in turn causing the overall Fortnite game and game platform to become one of the most widely played in the world. Mustard, who was the creative director for that version of the Fortnite and "Loremaster" for the overall project, incorporated characters from media franchises, including Star Wars and Marvel. He also led work on building live events in the game and co-wrote the Fortnite comics from Marvel and DC together with Christos Gage. In December 2020, he was promoted to Chief Creative Officer.

In September 2023, Mustard stepped down from his position at Epic. Later that year, he became a partner at AGBO, an independent entertainment company. Mustard had met filmmaker and AGBO co-founder Joe Russo in 2018, when they had collaborated on bringing Marvel villain Thanos to Fortnite and later became good friends.

Mustard has made cameo appearances in movies such as Star Wars: The Rise of Skywalker, The Matrix Resurrections and Avengers: Endgame.

He accepted awards on behalf of Fortnite at The Game Awards 2018 and The Game Awards 2019, and was a presenter at The Game Awards 2021. He also accepted Fortnite's award for Online Game of the Year at the 22nd Annual D.I.C.E. Awards in 2019.

== Personal life ==
Mustard currently lives in Salt Lake City, Utah, and is married to entertainment publicist and former Chair partner, Laura Mustard.
