= Infinity Blade: Redemption =

Novella by Brandon Sanderson

- First edition
- Author: Brandon Sanderson
- Language: English
- Genre: Fantasy novel
- Publication date: 3 September 2013
- Publication place: United States
- Media type: e-book
- Pages: 174
- Preceded by: Infinity Blade: Awakening

Infinity Blade: Redemption is a novella by fantasy author Brandon Sanderson. It is based on the action role-playing iOS video game series Infinity Blade developed by Chair Entertainment and Epic Games, and serves as a story bridge between the second game and the third. It was released as an e-book on September 3, 2013.

== Plot summary ==
Unlike the predecessor book, Infinity Blade: Awakening, Redemption presents two stories side-by-side. In the chapters are found the "contemporary" story of the characters from the games, starting with protagonist Siris and his enemy Raidriar locked in the Vault of Tears, as they were left at the end of Infinity Blade II. The story progresses through their rescue and subsequent discovery of what the Worker of Secrets has done during their imprisonment. Interspersed between the chapters are "Deviations," which are flashbacks to a time that appears to be the near future of present-day Earth, and the origins of the technology that created the Deathless, and of Galath, the Worker himself. The two streams eventually come together near the end of the book.

=== The Pangean Chapters ===
Siris and Raidriar, having been locked away by the Worker of Secrets at the end of Infinity Blade II, are shown continually at odds with each other, maiming and killing each other as each one's Deathless body regenerates on its own. Their souls sealed in by the prison, neither of them can escape to a rebirthing chamber. After an initially unknown period of time, Isa appears, having brought two other defeated Deathless to open the prison and take Siris' place, as required by the prison. Raidriar escapes with the duo, wishing to return to his kingdom. He finds that his kingdom is in ruins, and that he is considered a fake, as the Worker has created a "Soulless" version of the God King. The Soulless can use the cloned bodies, or "buds," that the Deathless can use for rebirth, but the Soulless use fragmented pieces of the original's identity, known in-story as the Quantum Identity Pattern, or Q.I.P. Raidriar escapes with a few who remain loyal to him, and journeys to meet up with Siris.

Siris, meanwhile, has been introduced to a rag-tag army gathered by Isa during what he discovers was his two-year imprisonment. Lux, an older woman with battle knowledge, has tried to turn the group into a band of fighters, but they have no leader. Isa has told exaggerated stories of "the Deathless that fought for man," who is Siris. As Siris gets to know the group, including playing children's games that he himself was denied during his own childhood, he feels the memories of his "Dark Self" — fragmented memories and habits of his time as Ausar the Vile — attempting to surface, tempting Siris to return to them in order to be the leader the people desire.

Raidriar meets up with the band, causing great tension between himself and Siris, but the former God King realizes that the enemies need to work together to correct the situation. He guides the group to a hidden lab containing what appears to be a self-maintaining rebirthing chamber. Raidriar later admits that it is not only a rebirthing chamber, but a machine that can turn an ordinary human into a Deathless. As his Soulless counterpart has severed ties with the other Deathless of the Pantheon, Raidriar realizes that they might need another Deathless on their team. He tempts Isa, who has become attracted to Siris, into entering the chamber, becoming a new Deathless.

As this happens, Siris approaches the tower seen in the first game to face the Soulless Raidriar. Expecting to find a foe as worthy as the real one, he instead finds the Soulless copy knows he is indeed a copy, and has gone quite insane. After a short but decisive battle, Siris uses the datapads still functioning in the temple to discover the Worker's master plan: the destruction of all organic life on the planet by fire-bombing the world from the broken moon.

=== The Origin Deviations ===
The modern-day interludes, or "deviations," focus on a data analyst named Uriel. Always working late, he prefers numbers to people. Numbers, he believes, are consistent and never lie. They are more easily understood than people like Adram, a marketing professional who always encourages Uriel to put a positive spin on things. The numbers, though, show that the project involving teleportation of non-living matter simply will not produce the results the CEO, Mr. Galath, desires.

Uriel discovers that several people have been moved off of the project. He can see the numbers, but not their intent. Eventually Uriel realizes there is another project, a very secretive project with only a few chosen to participate. Working late, as he always does, he works up his best presentation for the next meeting, sure that he will be chosen next. Although his presentation impresses Mr. Galath, it is Adram that is chosen to be reassigned next.

Uriel normally works very late, and his wife is always understanding. This one evening, though, he decides to go home at the same time as everyone else. He drives a modern car that drives itself to the owner's selected destination. The car usually stops in his driveway, but this time it stops at the curb. Rain pouring down, he notices Adram's car, a "classic" and therefore unmodified to drive itself, in the driveway. Uriel realizes why his wife has never had a problem with him staying late: she has been having an affair with Adram.

Emotionless, Uriel enters the house, catching his wife and Adram "in the act." He makes no hostile moves or words toward either of them, though Adram hurries away. Uriel then realizes that their son, Jori, had not been picked up from school by his wife, as he had assumed, but was riding home in the rain. Uriel rushes out of the house to find Adram in a frenzy, his wheels on the curb, a bicycle under his car.

Seeing Jori's dead body causes Uriel's control to break. He grabs a wrench from the front seat of Adram's car and kills the man. Uriel then realizes that the mysterious project, which would bring immortality to its participants, was the solution. He returns to work to meet Mr. Galath, informing him that he has an opening in his new project. He reveals what he knows about the project, which involves harnessing the soul of a person through the Quantum Identity Pattern. Uriel asks that Mr. Galath consider not himself, but his son, for the project. Galath agrees on the condition that Uriel never return to the project's site.

Laying Jori's body on the table, Uriel witnesses his rebirth as one of the immortals, or Deathless. He tells his son to "be a king," then leaves, with Jori calling out to him through the final paragraph of the last deviation.

=== The finale and bridge to the third game ===
The final chapters expand upon the early portions of Infinity Blade III. Raidriar, revealed to be the grown-up Jori, confronts the Worker of Secrets, or Galath. In the novella narrative, both call each other by their original names. Jori/Raidriar is determined to stop the destruction being planned by Galath/the Worker. After fighting toward the Worker, Raidriar faces Ashimar, once his friend Jarred. Raidriar is surprised to discover that his former friend wields another Infinity Blade. Raidriar defeats him with his Infinity Blade, and confronts the Worker.

The Worker reveals that he did not create a weapon that could kill him, but allows Raidriar to battle him. Raidriar is defeated, and about to be killed, when he teleports a module from a nearby table to Siris and Isa. Galath responds by impaling Raidriar with his newer Infinity Blade, disrupting his Q.I.P. and ending his Deathless life forever.
