= Infinity Blade III =

2013 video game

- App Store icon
- Developers: Chair Entertainment; Epic Games
- Publisher: Epic Games
- Engine: Unreal Engine 3
- Platform: iOS
- Release: September 18, 2013: Discontinued December 10, 2018
- Genre: Action role-playing
- Modes: Single-player, multiplayer

Infinity Blade III is an action role-playing game for iOS, developed by Chair Entertainment and Epic Games. It was the third game in the Infinity Blade series. It was released on the App Store on September 18, 2013.

The game was removed from the App Store on December 10, 2018, alongside Infinity Blade and Infinity Blade II due to difficulties in updating the game for newer hardware, with no plans for re-release. This app, as well the two previous titles, are no longer downloadable on one's purchased history as of August 28, 2020 due to Apple having terminated Epic Games’ developer account on that date.

== Gameplay ==
Combat in the game is similar to the first two installments. The player controls their character's actions by swiping and tapping the screen. Players can avoid attacks by dodging, blocking with shields or heavy weapons, or parrying the attack by swiping in the opposite direction of the attack. All three options can temporarily stun the enemy after a string of successful defenses, allowing the player to attack. A player can also use a super attack to trigger a quick-time event based on the equipped weapon class that is guaranteed to stun the enemy. The last way for the player to do damage is through magic spells, which are performed by drawing certain symbols on the screen.

The player can choose between two characters, Isa, a woman who focuses on magic and a bracer for defense and Siris, a man who focuses on physical fighting and uses a shield. Both characters have access to three different classes of weapons (light, heavy, dual), helmets, armor, rings, and bracer/shields. Light weapons, usually swords, allow the player character to use the equipped shield/bracer to block and are balanced between defence, speed, and attack. Heavy weapons such as spears and axes, focus on blocking as the primary defensive option and a slow but powerful attack. Dual weapons such as dual swords or daggers focus on dodging as the primary defensive option, and have a fast but weak attack. Helmets and armor affect the player's stats, dodging ability, and health. Rings decide the type and strength of the player's magic spells. Shields decide both the number of block points and elemental resistances. The player's equipment can have gems slotted into them which confer boosts such as stat increases, in-battle effects, and elemental damage and resistance. The player earns points by leveling up and mastering their equipment to boost the player's stats, which in turn give perks at certain milestones.

The overworld has changed from the previous two titles. The player begins in a hub world, the Hideout, where one can find the Training Golem, Potions Master, Blacksmith, Gem Cutter, and Merchant, the last three of which need to be unlocked through gameplay. For adventuring, instead of a single, large world with multiple paths like in the previous installments, the player travels to different locations from a world map. Each location is a distinct map that is unlocked through gameplay but each usually only has a single, linear path and some associated quests.

== Plot ==
In the introduction, the Worker of Secrets narrates about his immortal creations, the Deathless, and the wrath they bestowed on humanity. He forges the "Infinity Blade", the only weapon that can permanently kill Deathless. He is betrayed by a Deathless, the ruthless Ausar the Vile, who takes the Infinity Blade for himself, and locks The Worker away in his Vault of Tears. The God King Raidriar uses the Blade to enslave humanity until he is defeated by Siris—who is a reincarnation of Ausar the Vile, with no memory of his previous life. Siris, having used the Blade to kill Raidriar, unknowingly activates the Blade's potential to permanently kill the Deathless. Siris later frees The Worker, who then traps him and Raidriar in the Vault of Tears and continues his plan to destroy the world in order to build a new one.

Having escaped the Vault in Infinity Blade: Redemption, Raidriar, armed with the Infinity Blade, confronts The Worker, and realizes that he has been creating more Infinity Blades to keep the Deathless busy while he enacts his plan. After he defeats Raidriar in battle, The Worker clarifies his plan to "cleanse" the planet — to destroy all life on the planet and start anew — and offers Raidriar a chance to join him. Raidriar refuses and, knowing Siris is the only one who can defeat The Worker, sacrifices himself by teleporting The Worker's datapad away. Infuriated, The Worker impales Raidriar with an Infinity Blade, permanently killing him. Meanwhile, Siris' companion Isa is revived as a Deathless following an attack by The Worker.

Siris travels to Raidriar's castle to retrieve the datapad, but he realizes that he has been replaced by a soulless Raidriar, who is killed by Siris. After retrieving the datapad and the soulless Raidriar's weapon, the Infinity Cleaver, he returns to Isa, where the two theorize that The Worker has been forging more Infinity Blades. Isa ventures to the desert, where she uncovers a vault which was used to store all the Infinity Blades, and gains information from Terrovax, the High Lord of House Burke, about the other weapons. Isa rescues Siris' childhood friend, the blacksmith Jensen, from a heavily disfigured Thane, while Siris defeats Therin, "the Killer of Dreams", and retrieves the Infinity Spear. Isa is defeated in a battle with Lelindre, "the Mistress of the End", but she is spared by her and is given the Infinity Daggers. Meanwhile, Siris returns to the Vault of Tears to retrieve the Redeemer, the device that was used to erase his memories as Ausar, and asks Jensen to reprogram it for another purpose.

Siris and Isa head out to The Worker's lair and fight their way through, including the dragon Ba'el. Isa battles and defeats the soulless Raidriar, while Siris faces The Worker to stop him from boarding his ship and wiping out all life in the world. After an intense battle, The Worker parries away Siris' weapon, and holds him by the neck, telling him that he will "unmake the world as he please, just like he will unmake him." However, Siris twists around and sends the Infinity Blade into The Worker's chest. The Worker mocks him, as the weapon will not kill him permanently, but Siris inserts the Redeemer inside the blade, erasing The Worker's memory. As the Ark self-destructs, Isa saves Siris by teleporting him back to the Hideout, and the world is saved.

In the post-credits scene, Siris and Isa encounter a child that is building a sand castle that resembles the Ark. This child is presumed to be The Worker, reborn as a child, with his memories erased.

== Reception ==
Reception

Aggregate score
Aggregator	Score
Metacritic	78/100

Review scores
Publication	Score
IGN	9.1/10
TouchArcade	5/5

Justin Davis of IGN gave the game a rating of a 9.1 "Amazing", calling it a fitting end to the franchise. Davis stated that although not all of its ideas work, it is genuinely larger and more epic in score than its predecessors, lauding its "incredible" voice acting, "gorgeous" visuals, and "intense, rewarding combat".
