= Chair Entertainment =

American video game developer

Chair Entertainment Group, LLC
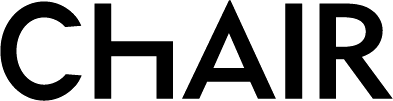
- Type: Subsidiary
- Industry: Video games
- Founded: May 12, 2005; 21 years ago in Provo, Utah, US
- Founders: Donald Mustard; Geremy Mustard; Ryan Holmes
- Headquarters: Salt Lake City, US
- Key people: Donald Mustard (creative director); Geremy Mustard (technical director)
- Products: Undertow; Shadow Complex; Infinity Blade; Infinity Blade II; Infinity Blade III
- Parent: Epic Games (2008–present)

Chair Entertainment Group, LLC is an American video game developer based in Salt Lake City. The company was acquired by Epic Games in 2008.

== History ==
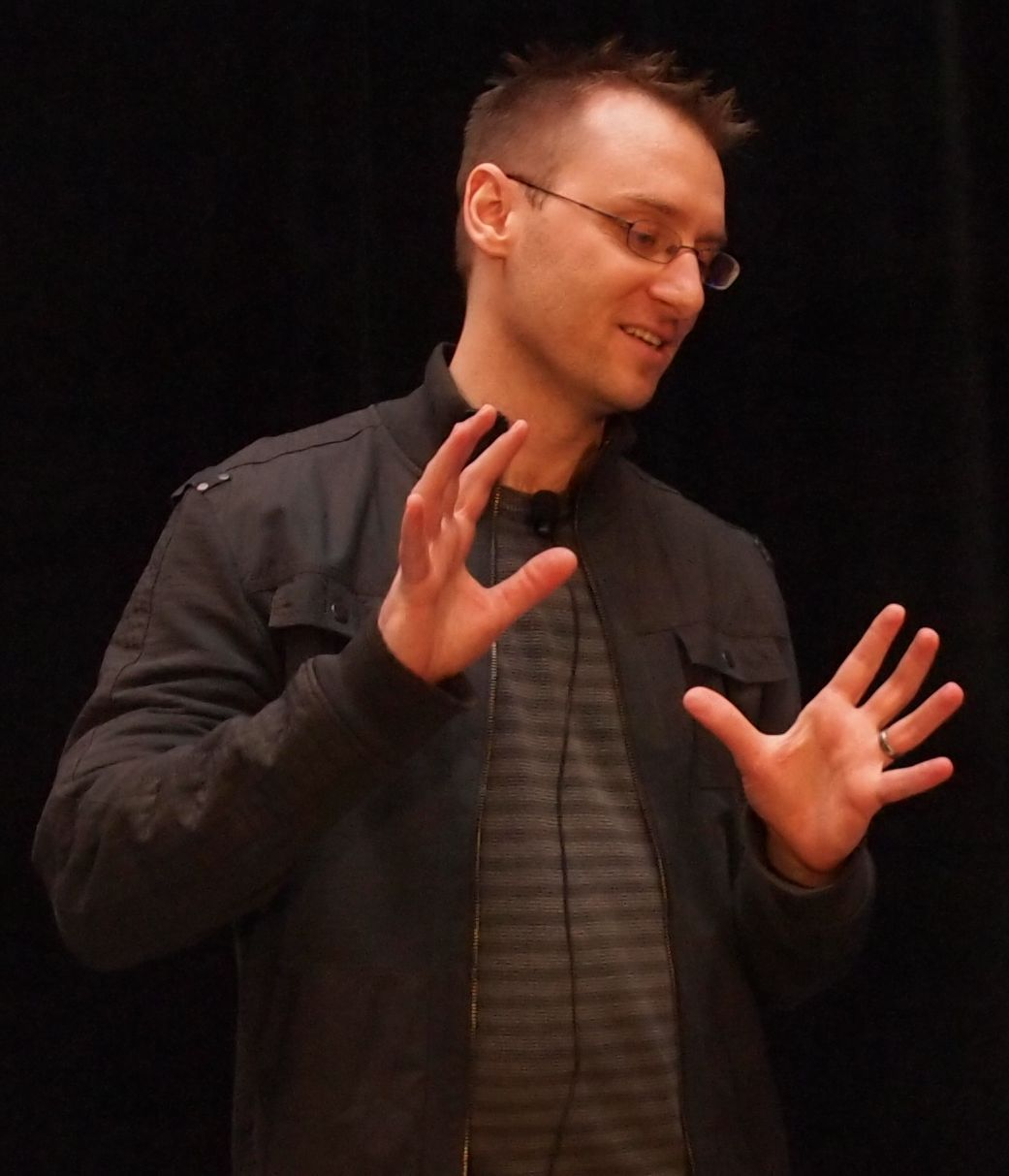
Donald Mustard at the 2011 Game Developers Conference

Chair Entertainment was formed in 2005 by Donald Mustard and Geremy Mustard, CEO Ryan Holmes, and other key Advent Rising core design team members Bert Lewis, Orlando Barrowes, Nathan Trewartha, Cameron Dayton and Jared Trulock. Soon after, Chair licensed the literary rights to its Empire property to best-selling author Orson Scott Card. The novel Empire was published by Tor Books and debuted as a New York Times Best-Seller in November 2006. Card has since released the literary sequel Hidden Empire and committed to writing additional novels for the series. Chair also secured an option with Joel Silver and Warner Bros. for the Empire movie, which is currently in development. Additionally, Chair has retained the rights to produce future video games and comic books based on its Empire property.

Chair began production on its first Xbox Live Arcade game, Undertow, in the fall of 2006. Released on November 21, 2007, Undertow is a fast-paced, action-shooter that takes place entirely underwater. Upon release, Undertow won numerous E3 and Editor's Choice awards and was named Xbox Live Arcade Game of the Year by Official Xbox Magazine.

On January 29, 2008, Chair announced that it had acquired the interactive rights to Orson Scott Card's novel Ender's Game with plans to adapt the best-selling novel as a digitally distributed video game for all viable downloadable platforms. In May 2008, Chair Entertainment was acquired by Epic Games. On August 19, 2009, Chair released its second game, Shadow Complex, exclusively for Xbox Live Arcade. The game was published by Microsoft Game Studios and won more than 45 Game of the Year and 35 E3 and Editors Choice Awards. The game was released to positive reviews, with a score of 88 out of 100 on Metacritic.com as of July 10, 2010. Shadow Complex featured a story written by famed comic book author Peter David and was set in Chair's Empire universe.

On September 1, 2010, Chair's next title, code-named "Project Sword", was announced at the Apple Fall Event 2010. The game, Infinity Blade, a sword fighting title playable on iPhone, iPod Touch, and iPad, was released December 2010, and is the first game on Apple mobile devices powered by Unreal Engine 3. It utilizes Apple's new GameCenter online gaming service. A tech demo for UE3, entitled Epic Citadel was released on iTunes the same day as a free download (though it was created by Epic Games, not Chair).

In October 2010, Chair relocated from Provo, Utah to Salt Lake City, Utah. Chair relocated to its current studio in South Jordan, Utah in 2013.

On December 14, 2010, Chair Entertainment confirmed in an interview that it had ceased development on the video game version of Ender's Game in favor of a continued focus on developing its own original intellectual properties.

On October 3, 2011, Chair released the book, Infinity Blade: Awakening, written by Brandon Sanderson.

During the Apple Fall Event 2011, Infinity Blade II was announced, with new features and visuals which used the next generation of iOS hardware (the iPad 2 and iPhone 4S). The game was released on December 1, 2011.

On January 5, 2012, Epic Games announced that the Infinity Blade franchise had generated over $23 million in revenue.

In August 2013, Chair released the literary sequel, Infinity Blade: Redemption, also written by Brandon Sanderson.

At the Apple iPhone 5S conference on September 11, 2013, Infinity Blade III, allegedly the final Infinity Blade game in the series, was announced by Donald Mustard and Geremy Mustard, who took the stage to provide a live demo. Infinity Blade III debuted at #1 on the App Store on September 18, 2013. The game featured the exclusive debut of the original, Infinity Blade-inspired song "Monster" from award-winning alternative rock band Imagine Dragons.

In late 2015 Chair released a remastered version of Shadow Complex for Windows PC with an Xbox One and PlayStation 4 release in March 2016, and May 2016 respectively.

On November 11, 2015 Donald Mustard and director J. J. Abrams released a video announcing a collaboration between ChAIR and Bad Robot to develop a new video game property code-named Spyjinx.

In early 2016, Donald Mustard assumed the role of Worldwide Creative Director for Epic Games, overseeing design and creative development for Epic's full portfolio of video games.

== Games ==
- Undertow (2007)
- Shadow Complex (2009)
- Infinity Blade (2010)
- Infinity Blade II (2011)
- Vote!!! The Game (2012)
- Infinity Blade III (2013)
- Battle Breakers (2018)
- Spyjinx (Cancelled)

== Books ==
- The Empire Duet by Orson Scott Card
  - Empire
  - Hidden Empire
- Infinity Blade series by Brandon Sanderson
  - Infinity Blade: Awakening
  - Infinity Blade: Redemption
