= Infinity Blade: Awakening =

2011 novella by Brandon Sanderson

- First edition
- Author: Brandon Sanderson
- Language: English
- Genre: Fantasy novel
- Publisher: Chair Entertainment
- Publication date: 3 October 2011
- Publication place: United States
- Media type: e-book
- Pages: 128

Infinity Blade: Awakening is a novella by fantasy author Brandon Sanderson. It is based on the action role-playing iOS video game Infinity Blade developed by Chair Entertainment and Epic Games, and serves as a story bridge between the first and the second game. It was released as an e-book on October 3, 2011 which coincided with the release of the fourth update for Infinity Blade and the announcement of the sequel.

== Plot summary ==
The story picks up from the main ending of Infinity Blade. Siris, the final player character in Infinity Blade, returns to his hometown of Drem's Maw after killing the Deathless God King with his own sword, the Infinity Blade. The elders of Drem's Maw force Siris to leave because they fear the other Deathless will attack Drem's Maw to reclaim the Infinity Blade. Siris returns to Lantimor, where he had defeated the God King.

While there Siris gains a partner of sorts in Isa, an assassin who is part freedom fighter and part self-serving mercenary. They learn that the God King has been resurrected and that the Infinity Blade can only permanently kill a Deathless once it has been completely activated. (In the game Siris completely activated the Infinity Blade after defeating the Ancestor.)

They travel to the lands of Saydhi, another Deathless, to learn from her where the Worker of Secrets, the creator of the Infinity Blade, is imprisoned so they can return the Infinity Blade to him. Isa remains behind as Siris takes on the champions of Saydhi one by one.

Afterward, Saydhi tells Siris where to go, but then attacks him. He kills her, but is captured by the resurrected God King, and the Infinity Blade is retaken by the God King. Isa kills Siris with a crossbow bolt so the God King cannot kill Siris permanently with the Infinity Blade. Siris then wakes up in a healing tank similar to the one beneath the God King's castle, and learns he is a Deathless originally named Ausar.

The warriors that had gone to fight the God King were revealed to be just countless resurrections of Ausar. The Ancestor, whose name is Archarin, was the son of one of these resurrections. Siris and Isa part ways after this realization, with Siris heading out to free the Worker of Secrets and find a way to defeat all of the Deathless permanently.

== Sequel ==
In 2013, a sequel, titled Infinity Blade: Redemption, was released.
