= Infinity Blade =

2010 video game

- App Store icon
- Developers: Chair Entertainment; Epic Games
- Publisher: Epic Games
- Director: Donald Mustard
- Producer: Simon Hurley
- Designer: Donald Mustard
- Programmers: Scott K. Bowen; Geremy Mustard
- Artist: Adam Ford
- Writers: Donald Mustard; Simon Hurley
- Composer: Joshua Aker
- Engine: Unreal Engine 3
- Platform: iOS
- Release: December 9, 2010
- Genre: Action role-playing
- Modes: Single-player, multiplayer

Infinity Blade is an action role-playing game developed by Chair Entertainment and Epic Games and released through the Apple App Store on December 9, 2010. It was the first iOS video game to run on Unreal Engine 3. In the game, the unnamed player character fights a series of one-on-one battles in a derelict castle to face the immortal God King. When in battle, players swipe the screen to attack and parry, and tap the screen to dodge and block enemy attacks. Upon defeat, the player restarts the game as the character's descendant with the same items and experience level.

The game was developed by a team of twelve people, who took two months to make a playable demo and three more to finish the game. Infinity Blade was intended to demonstrate the new iOS version of the Unreal Engine, and to combine the combat of Karateka and Prince of Persia with the loneliness of Shadow of the Colossus. The game received four free expansions that added new equipment, endings, and game modes.

Infinity Blade was the fastest-grossing app in the history of iOS upon its release. It made US$1.6 million in its first four days, and over US$23 million by the end of 2011. It was well received by gaming critics. Reviews praised the graphics and compared the mobile game favorably to console games. Critics also praised the swipe-based combat system, but split opinions on the cyclical gameplay as either addictive or repetitive. Chair later released an arcade port and two sequels: Infinity Blade II and Infinity Blade III. Author Brandon Sanderson also wrote two novellas set between the games: Infinity Blade: Awakening and Infinity Blade: Redemption.

The game, along with its two sequels, was removed from the App Store on December 10, 2018, due to difficulties in updating the game for newer hardware.

== Gameplay ==
A screenshot showing combat in Infinity Blade. The character's and enemy's health bars are at the top of the screen, while the dodge and shield buttons are at the bottom; the special attack buttons are not visible.

In the primary portion of Infinity Blade, the player character travels a mostly linear path through a ruined castle and fights one-on-one battles with oversized enemies. The path through the castle is a series of discrete locations where the player can pan the camera around the stationary player character to view a fully three-dimensional area. The player taps locations highlighted onscreen to trigger either a short cutscene as the player character moves to the next location, or a sword battle with an enemy. During combat, the player controls the character's sword by swiping a finger across the screen. Players can touch icons at the bottom of the screen to dodge attacks by ducking right or left, or to block attacks with a shield, which has a limited number of uses during a single battle. Players may also parry incoming attacks with an intercepting sword move that, for example, parries an attack from the left with a swipe to the left. Each of these three counters can leave the enemy vulnerable to counterattack for a short period, but incorrect counters result in damage to the player character, as reflected in the health bar. When players fail in battle en route to the God King, the game resets to the location preceding the previous battle. Enemies can perform attacks that cannot be parried or blocked—such as a shield bash—that must be dodged. Players use two special abilities via icons atop the screen: the Super Attack temporarily stuns the opponent, and magic heals or attacks as indicated by drawing a given symbol. Both require time to recharge after use. When attacking, the player can swipe in any direction, and can do specific attack combinations to deal extra damage.

In addition to combat, there is also a mild role-playing component. An experience point system levels up the player character and their equipment (weapons, armor, shields, helms, and magic rings). Equipment pieces have special properties and a predetermined number of experience points required to master them. Mastering a piece of equipment increases its sale value but decreases the player's experience gain by 20%. Upon leveling up or mastering a piece of equipment, players gain attribute points that can be allotted towards four character attributes: health, attack, shield power, or magic. Each point can only be allocated once and is a permanent upgrade to the character. Players can purchase new equipment using in-game money from sacks and treasure chests found throughout the castle, defeated enemies, and sales of unused equipment. In-game money can be purchased with real money within the game.

The game follows a cyclical narrative structure in which a knight and his descendants individually explore a castle in a quest to battle the primary antagonist, the immortal God King. In the game's introduction (which serves as the game's tutorial) the knight challenges the God King, but is slain by him. The player then assumes the role of the dead knight's descendant as he starts his journey at the beginning of the castle. This cycle, called a bloodline, continues after the player finally faces the God King and either dies or wins. The player may also choose to join the God King and terminate the cycle; upon doing so, the game resumes at the checkpoint before fighting the God King. Enemy difficulty increases with each bloodline cycle. Another bloodline ending is unlocked after purchasing the Infinity Blade item: the sword is placed into a pedestal in the castle's underground dungeons and three doors open. After then defeating each of the three "Deathless"—immortal beings like the God King—of increasing difficulty found within, a final fourth door opens, and the player faces a mechanized warrior guarding the high-tech chamber where the God King is reborn whenever he is killed. Upon defeating the mechanized warrior, the chamber is revealed to be controlled by an ancestor of the player character, who chose to serve the God King. After fighting the ancestor, the player character is told that the Infinity Blade can prevent immortals like the God King from resurrecting after death. The player is then given the option of either starting the next bloodline as they do when defeated, or resetting the game and starting New Game+ mode, which resets all gold and item progression but maintains the character's experience level, letting the player remaster the items and level up even further.

=== Expansions ===
Chair Entertainment released four expansions as free updates to the game. The first, released December 20, 2010, added a new enemy, equipment, and microtransactions. It also removed an experience level cap. The second update, titled Infinity Blade: The Deathless Kings, was released on March 2, 2011, and added the dungeons as a second branch to the game's path. This expansion also added new equipment, enemies, and the second ending where the player character defeats his ancestor. The third update, Infinity Blade: Arena, was released on May 19, 2011. It added the player vs. player "Arena Mode", a tiered combat game progression where one player fights as the hero and the other as an enemy from the game. The update also included new equipment and a single-player version of Arena Mode called "Survival Mode". On October 4, 2011, a fourth update added a new enemy and new equipment to coincide with the announcement of the forthcoming sequel Infinity Blade II.

== Development ==
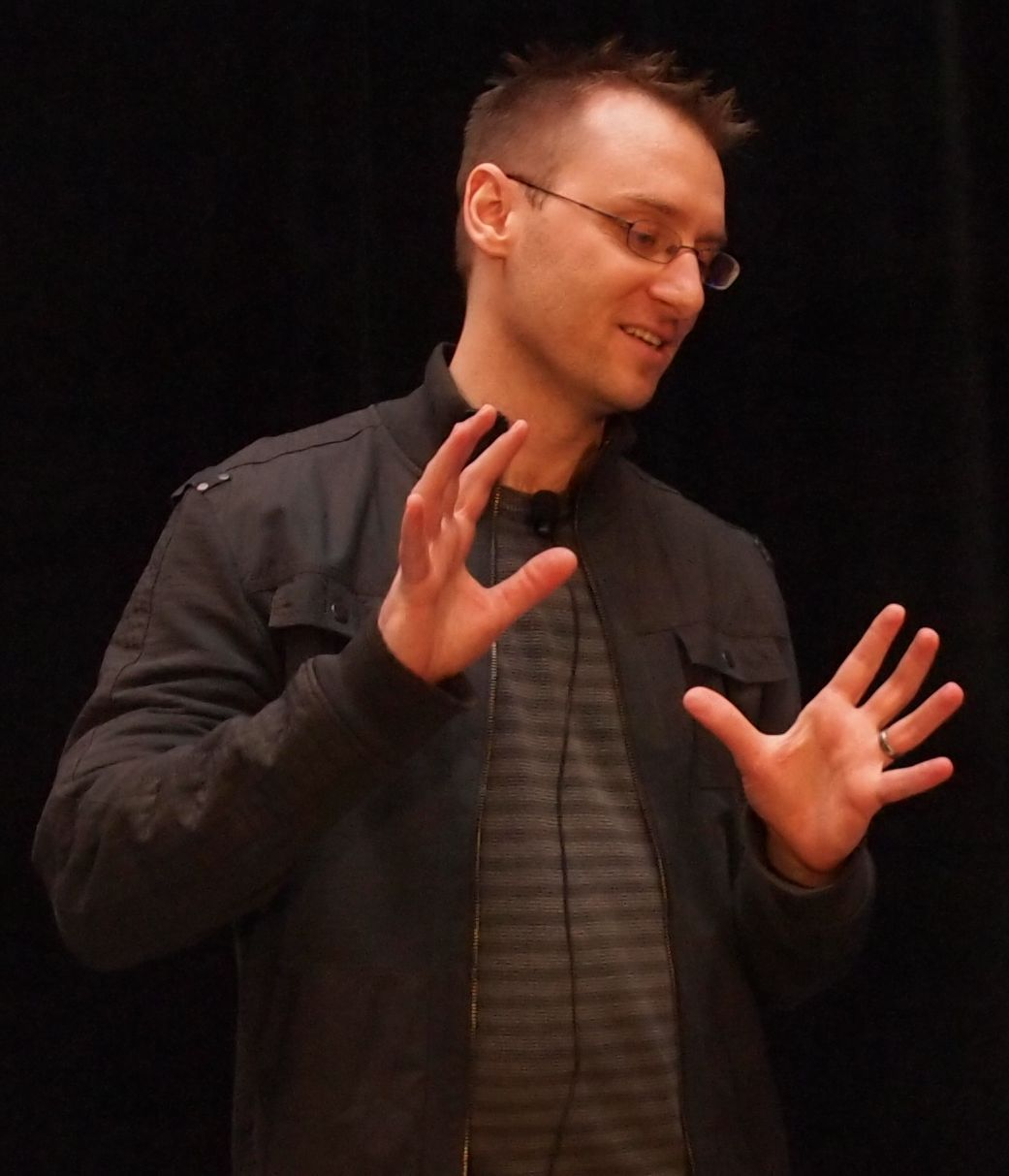
Chair co-founder and creative director Donald Mustard at the 2011 Game Developers Conference

Infinity Blade was created by Chair Entertainment, a subsidiary company of Epic Games. In July 2010, Chair had both recently finished the Xbox Live Arcade game Shadow Complex and been acquired by Epic. Chair was brainstorming Kinect and Wii games, including an idea similar to Infinity Blade, and Epic was nearing completion of an iOS version of the Unreal Engine 3 graphics engine and in need of a "killer game" to show it off. Epic had previously licensed the engine for use in numerous console and personal computer games. They asked Chair to develop a game for the engine in five months, with a playable demo for the Apple Special Event conference in two months. The team decided within a few days to work on the Infinity Blade concept, codenamed "Project Sword". Instead of normal initial game development, where working prototypes test gameplay ideas, Chair spent the first week of development refining the gameplay concept on paper before beginning to code. Many of the core gameplay ideas were developed in their first few hours. Geremy Mustard, Chair's co-founder and technical director, estimates that the team cut two-thirds of that initial design due to lack of time. Refining the complex touch-based interface was complicated due to the Unreal Engine's incomplete status and the native iOS code library's lack of support for fast touch-based gameplay. The five-month development was completed by a team of twelve people from Chair, with assistance from Epic. In addition to Geremy Mustard, the team was composed of Chair co-founder and creative director Donald Mustard; Simon Hurley as producer; Joshua Andersen and Scott K. Bowen as programmers; Adam Ford as art director; Orlando Barrowes, Bert Lewis, Mike Low, Scott Stoddard, and Nathan Trewartha as artists and animators; Joshua Akers as composer; and Brandon Raul Campos as lead tester.

The game's swipe-based swordplay was based on Donald Mustard's desire for unique gameplay based on nuanced sword fighting and parrying. He described the game's influences as the combat of Karateka and Prince of Persia combined with the "lonely epicness" of Shadow of the Colossus. Chair sought to develop an experience that could be picked up and played for a minute (a single battle) or half an hour (a bloodline). They felt that many other developers accustomed to consoles were wrong to make iOS games that required long-playing experiences to feel meaningful, and so Chair developed the bloodline concept as a natural breakpoint. They also felt that mobile games like Infinity Blade with constant action elements went too long without giving the player time to relax and resulted in player exhaustion, and so Chair kept their battles short with brief cinematic pauses in longer battles. Chair showed their playable demo at the Apple conference on September 1, 2010, after weeks of rehearsal, and attracted much attention to the game. It was released on December 9, 2010. While Chair itself spent little on marketing, Apple used the game extensively in advertisements for its devices.

The music for the game was composed by Josh Aker, who had written the music for previous Chair games. The soundtrack was intended by Aker to be "intense" during combat, but to vary between "serene" and "otherworldly" outside battle. It is a mixture of live and synthetic instrument performances. Cello and nyckelharpa were the primary instruments used. Aker wanted to have "avant-garde performances" for the recordings. The soundtrack was sold as a digital album, Infinity Blade: Original Soundtrack, through several online music retailers. Chair began to develop the game's first update before the initial game was released. They intended only to add new monsters and features, but added the ability to purchase gold due to customer requests. Chair did not rebalance the game to incentivize in-app purchases. Work on The Deathless Kings update began immediately afterward. Chair felt that releasing several large, free updates to the game would increase their overall user base and result in more total sales due to word of mouth.

== Reception ==
Reception

Aggregate score
Aggregator	Score
Metacritic	87/100

Review scores
Publication	Score
1Up.com	B+
Edge	8/10
Eurogamer	8/10
GamePro	5/5
IGN	9/10
Pocket Gamer	9/10
TouchArcade	5/5

Infinity Blade was noted for its sales at launch, selling more than 270,000 copies and making over US$1.6 million in its first four days—the "fastest-grossing app" ever released for iOS at the time. By the end of 2011, it had made at least US$23 million in revenue. Around fourteen months after the initial release, Chair noted that half of the game's sales were for the iPhone and half were for the iPad and iPod. After releasing the sequel, Epic Games noted in 2012 that the series was Epic's most profitable by measure of revenue against person-hours spent in development.

Infinity Blade was reviewed by several major gaming sites in addition to mobile game-focused sites. Critics praised the game's graphics heavily. IGN reviewer Hilary Goldstein said that it was "an absolute stunner for any handheld device and ushers in a new era of possibility for high-end graphics." GamePro's Ryan Rigney called the game "downright gorgeous" and said that the graphics were almost at the level of an Xbox 360 game, which was echoed by John Meyer of Wired, who claimed that it had the best graphics of any iPad game. The reviewer for Edge further praised the art direction, especially with regards to the enemy and armor designs.

The gameplay was generally praised by reviewers, who typically found the combat engaging, but were split on the repetitive aspects of the game. 1UP.com's Matt Clark said that the sword gameplay "just feels right", while Mark Brown of Eurogamer said that the combat had an excitement factor that pushed players to keep on going for one more battle. Tracy Erickson of Pocket Gamer described the swipe-based combat system as "easy to understand, though tough to master", and Nick Chester of Destructoid said that although the combat was not very complicated, it was fun to play. The role-playing game elements were praised Destructoid's Chester called them "satisfying", and IGN's Goldstein said that they added to the game's difficulty. Brown's review for Eurogamer, however, said that while good they were not as engaging as the combat, and the Edge review dismissed them as minimal. Reviewers had mixed opinions on the effectiveness of the bloodline system's repetition: Destructoid's Chester described it as addictive, and IGN's Goldstein agreed, but Erickson's review for Pocket Gamer said that the game had problems with repetition and Wired's Meyer dismissed it as "repetitive ... as the title suggests". J. Nicholas Geist, writing for Kill Screen, focused his entire review on the cyclical nature of the game, treating its nature of repetition with small changes between each bloodline as a metaphor for life. Most reviewers found themselves between the two extremes, with Brown of Eurogamer simultaneously describing it as "alarmingly repetitious" but still addictive and 1UP.com's Clark saying that enjoying the game required getting past the repetition, despite being "stellar".

During the 14th Annual Interactive Achievement Awards, the Academy of Interactive Arts & Sciences nominated Infinity Blade for "Portable Game of the Year".

== Sequels and spin-offs ==
On October 28, 2011, Epic Games and Adrenaline Amusements released an arcade version of the game, Infinity Blade FX. The game is played on a 46-inch screen rigged with optical sensors to mimic a large iPhone or iPad screen. Each arcade stand contains up to three screens, and players can play against each other or in the single-player game. A sequel to the iOS game, Infinity Blade II, was announced on October 4, 2011, during the Apple iPhone 4S keynote presentation. It was released on December 1, 2011, and featured enhanced graphics, a new storyline, and new fighting styles. A spinoff game, Infinity Blade: Dungeons, was in development for iOS by Epic Games subsidiary Impossible Games, but was cancelled in February 2013 when Impossible Games was shut down. A final game in the trilogy, Infinity Blade III, was released on September 18, 2013.

A novella by author Brandon Sanderson was released before both Infinity Blade II and III to serve as a story bridge between the games. Infinity Blade: Awakening was released as an e-book on October 4, 2011, to correspond with the announcement of Infinity Blade II. The story gives the protagonist of the first game a name, Siris, introduces the idea that the God King was one of multiple Deathless in the world, as is Siris, and has Siris and the assassin Isa journey to find the Worker of Secrets in order to kill the resurrected God King and the other Deathless. The second e-book novella, Infinity Blade: Redemption, was released on September 9, 2013, just before the third game. In it, Siris and the God King escape from their imprisonment by the Worker of Secrets, while extensive flashbacks show the rise of the Deathless in a future-Earth analog. While Siris disrupts the Worker of Secret's plans, the God King confronts and is killed by the Worker.

A Chinese version of the game for Xbox One and Android was published by Tencent Games on November 28, 2015.

A day after Epic Games removed the Infinity Blade trilogy from the App Store, the titular weapon made a crossover appearance in the winter-themed seventh season of Fortnite Battle Royale as a unique, very powerful melee weapon that can be obtained in a match, granting any player who finds it devastating abilities and extra survivability, at the cost of being unable to use other items. Three days later, however, Epic Games "vaulted" (removed) the weapon over concerns that it was too overpowered. Epic Games later brought back the Infinity Blade in February 2019 as a restricted item that is only available in the limited-time mode "Sword Fight", reducing its power and allowing multiple copies of it to be found from loot chests.
