= Advent Rising =

2005 video game

- North American cover art
- Developer: GlyphX Games
- Publisher: Majesco
- Designers: Donald Mustard; Geremy Mustard
- Writers: Orson Scott Card; Cameron Dayton
- Composers: Tommy Tallarico; Michael Richard Plowman
- Engine: Unreal Engine 2
- Platforms: Windows; Xbox; OnLive
- Release: NA: May 31, 2005 (Xbox); NA: August 9, 2005 (PC); EU: February 17, 2006
- Genres: Action-adventure, third-person shooter
- Mode: Single-player

Advent Rising is an action-adventure third-person shooter video game developed by GlyphX Games and published by Majesco. The game was released on May 31, 2005, for Xbox and on August 9, 2005, for Microsoft Windows. Its story was created by The Mustard Brothers and featured a script written by science fiction writers Orson Scott Card and Cameron Dayton; the lead sound design was done by Joey Kuras working under Tommy Tallarico Studios.

Advent Rising was the first in a planned trilogy which also saw the development of a game that would take place alongside Advent Rising, called Advent Shadow for the PSP. Despite a large advertising campaign including promotion in cinemas, the game's retail performance fell far short of expectations. By the end of 2005, Majesco had completely revised its business plan to focus towards handheld games and canceled plans for future Advent Rising games.

A five-issue spin-off comic book series was produced and ran from October 2005 to November 2006. Plans for novel tie-ins by Orson Scott Card never came to fruition. In June 2006, Donald Mustard posted a statement on the website of his new venture, Chair Entertainment, stating that he "would be happy to finish the Advent series if the opportunity presented itself", but confirmed he does not currently hold the rights to do.

== Plot ==
=== Story ===
In the distant future Gideon Wyeth; the game's protagonist, escorting a group of human ambassadors from a space station to a meeting with an alien race called the Aurelians. At the meeting, the Aurelians tell the humans that they view them as gods and then warn them of another race of aliens called the Seekers who intend to destroy all humanity. Shortly thereafter, the space station is attacked by the Seekers. Gideon manages to board an escape pod and lands on the planet Edumea below.

On the planet, Gideon aids the Marines in their battle against the Seekers, but soon learns that the planet will shortly be destroyed by a meteor shower. The planet is evacuated, and Gideon accepts an invitation from the Aurelians to board their ship. After learning that humans have untapped mystical powers, he begins training with the Aurelians.

As Gideon is training, the ship is attacked by the Seekers. Gideon and some of the Aurelians evacuate to the Seeker vessel, though it is on a crash course with the Aurelian homeworld. Gideon and the remaining Aurelians find the planet overrun by Seekers. After liberating the planet, they travel to the Galactic Council to seek their help in combating the Seeker assault on humanity.

When the Council calls the Seekers to explain themselves, a being materializes in the Council chambers claiming to be a “true” human and a god. The being, a Koroem, takes full responsibility for the human genocide and claims that it ordered the Seekers to exterminate humanity because they were physically imitating the Koroem.

A battle ensues after the Koroem wounds one of the Aurelians, but it is ultimately killed when Gideon uses a previously unknown mystical ability. This opens a portal that Gideon is dragged into. He finds himself on an ice planet, where a horned creature dubbed "The Stranger" appears and says, "Come with me, human. There is much to be done." It then beckons Gideon to follow.

== Development ==
The game's overall story was created by Donald and Geremy Mustard. The dialog and screenplay was written by Orson Scott Card and Cameron Dayton. Card's influences are noticeable in the terminology which has been carried over from Ender's Game. The terms "vids", "Buggers", and "ansible" are all references from his critically acclaimed novels (though the term ansible was coined by Ursula K. Le Guin, and was not actually added to the script by Card himself, but by Donald Mustard).

In 2008, Novint announced they are adding Novint Falcon support to this game and will sell it as Ascension Reborn for the Novint Falcon only.

== Reception ==
Reception

Aggregate score
Aggregator	Score	
Aggregator	PC	Xbox
Metacritic	70/100	68/100

Review scores
Publication	Score	
Publication	PC	Xbox
Computer Gaming World	3/5	N/A
Edge	N/A	6/10
Electronic Gaming Monthly	N/A	5/10 (Note: Three critics of Electronic Gaming Monthly gave the Xbox version each a score of 4.5/10, 4/10, and 6.5/10.)
Eurogamer	N/A	6/10
Game Informer	N/A	7.75/10
GamePro	N/A	4.5/5
GameRevolution	N/A	C−
GameSpot	6.3/10	5.7/10
GameSpy	2.5/5	2.5/5
GameTrailers	N/A	7.5/10
GameZone	7.3/10	8.1/10
IGN	7.9/10	7.8/10
Official Xbox Magazine (US)	N/A	8/10
PC Gamer (US)	62%	N/A
Detroit Free Press	N/A	3/4
Maxim	N/A	4/5

Following its Xbox release, the game received "average" reviews according to the review aggregation website Metacritic. The most common complaints were the large number of bugs which caused a range of problems including freezing. Another common complaint regarded the difficulty in using the targeting system.

The game visual design choice was noted by several reviewers, pointing out that the characters all appear fairly elongated, although it has been said that this was a deliberate stylistic choice.

Scott Jones of Maxim gave the game four stars out of five, saying, "The game's unique flick-targeting system—'flick' the right control stick towards an enemy and you're automatically locked on—takes some getting used to, but actually frees up the triggers and face buttons, meaning you've got plenty of options when it's time to dole out ass-bootings." Jim Schaefer of Detroit Free Press gave it three stars out of four, saying, "my biggest overall complaint is that the game's camera can be jumpy and jittery, leaving you discombobulated. It distracts you from the very good story line and well-done video cut scenes." Charles Herold of The New York Times, however, gave it an average review, saying that "Its most interesting aspect is 'flick targeting,' in which you snap your right control stick at an enemy to lock your weapons on it."

Upon the release of the PC version of the game a few months after the Xbox counterpart, the game was slightly better received, garnering above-average reviews according to Metacritic. Many reviewers felt that the months long delay had been put to good use as many of the glitches in the Xbox version had been fixed. Framerate was also improved, with slowdowns becoming rarer. A free copy of the PC version was included on the DVD release of the 2007 Uwe Boll film Seed.

A million dollars was offered in a contest via Xbox Live for the first player to find a set of hidden symbols spread throughout the levels of the game. On August 15, 2005, the contest was cancelled, due to concerns that there was "no technically feasible solution that would allow the contest to continue in a fair and secure manner". Majesco offered, as compensation to those players, the choice of two free games (BloodRayne 2, Guilty Gear X2 #Reload, Psychonauts, Raze's Hell, and/or Phantom Dust) and an apology on its home page. Xbox Live was terminated for original Xbox games in 2010. Advent Rising is now supported on Insignia, a revival service the original Xbox restoring online functionality

== Comics ==
An avid comics fan, game creator Donald Mustard originally realized the story of Advent Rising in hand-drawn comic books. He revealed in a 2005 interview: "With Advent, from day one, we conceived it initially as a comic book itself. Back when I was getting out of high school, we were laying the foundation for Advent. I drew the first several hours of what would ultimately become the game as a comic book." The release of the Advent Rising game was supported by a promotional one-shot comic book produced by DC Comics. The comic was written by Lee Hammock and drawn by Billy Dallas Patton as a direct tie-in to the action of the game. It was inserted free of charge within a handful of comic books published by DC.

Another comic book, this time a series, grew out of the partnership between Majesco and 360ep, a young entertainment properties management concern founded by former Marvel Comics CEO Bill Jemas. The new comic series, Advent Rising: Rock the Planet, was written by Rob Worley, with layouts by Arthur Dela Cruz, pencils by Cliff Richards, inks by Dennis Crisostomo, colors by Cris Delara, and letters by Simon Bowland. The comic was produced with oversight by Mustard and Jemas. This new series begins the franchise some ten years before the events of the game. It follows the adventures of Gideon, Ethan, and Olivia in their formative, teenage years. The first issue was published on October 26, 2005. The fifth and final issue was released on November 22, 2006.

== Advent Shadow ==
Advent Shadow
- Developer: Full Fat
- Publisher: Majesco
- Platform: PlayStation Portable
- Release: Cancelled
- Genre: Action-adventure
- Mode: Single-player

Advent Shadow was an action-adventure game originally planned for the PlayStation Portable handheld as a side story of Advent Rising which ended up cancelled in January 2006.

It followed the story of Marin Steel, a mercenary pilot thrust into a saga of intergalactic proportions. In the midst of extracting herself from a hostile negotiation, Marin is interrupted by a planetary invasion led by monstrous aliens bent on human genocide. In her efforts to escape the dying world, she encounters young Gideon Wyeth, the protagonist of Advent Rising, and together they find themselves swept up in a massive struggle against dire forces bent on the destruction of humanity.

Majesco suffered some financial difficulties, and due to the poor sale of Advent Shadow's console predecessor, Advent Rising, the game was quietly cancelled in January 2006.
