= Infinity Blade II =

2011 video game

- App Store icon
- Developers: Chair Entertainment; Epic Games
- Publisher: Epic Games
- Engine: Unreal Engine 3
- Platform: iOS
- Release: December 1, 2011: Discontinued December 10, 2018
- Genre: Action role-playing
- Modes: Single-player, multiplayer

Infinity Blade II was an action role-playing video game for iOS developed by Chair Entertainment and Epic Games. The game was the sequel to Infinity Blade by the same developers.

Infinity Blade II was announced on October 4, 2011, during the Apple iPhone 4S Presentation Keynote. It was subsequently released on December 1, 2011. The game featured enhanced graphics and a storyline continuing from the novel Infinity Blade: Awakening. A sequel, Infinity Blade III, was released on September 18, 2013.

The game was removed from the App Store on December 10, 2018, alongside Infinity Blade and Infinity Blade III, due to difficulties in updating the game for newer hardware.

== Gameplay ==
In Infinity Blade II, as with its predecessor, the player explores the world through an "on-rails" mechanic; that is, the player's path through the environment is largely predetermined and choices of direction are limited. Despite this, the player may choose to explore different paths through the castle that serves as the central environment of the game, leading to various ends such as Thane's tower, the chamber containing the MX-Goliath, and the cavern of the Stone Demon. Progression through the castle is halted every time the character enters a new room or encounters a new foe, giving the player a chance to search for loot (bags of gold are hidden throughout many scenes), equip or buy/sell weapons, gather information on upcoming enemies, and choose the next point in the path. The player has a certain amount of freedom in moving the camera around while the character is at rest. While the character is in motion, camera movement is much more limited, as the scene becomes cinematic in nature.

The primary game mechanic is one-on-one sword combat with enemies encountered throughout the scripted path. The player controls the character's weapon or weapons by swiping a finger across the screen. While in combat, players can touch the bottom left or bottom right side of the screen to dodge attacks or the bottom center of the screen to block attacks with a shield, which breaks if used too much. Players can also parry blows by matching the timing of their blows with their foes' and swiping in a parallel direction. New to Infinity Blade II is the ability to fight with dual wield and heavy weapons, separate classes from the "light" weapons that were the only type available in the first game. When fighting with dual weapons, blocking is unavailable, replaced by a downwards dodge action. By contrast, when fighting with heavy weapons, dodging is unavailable, and the player instead must counterattack by blocking in the correct direction. Successfully dodging, blocking, or parrying enough times in a row stuns the enemy, leaving them vulnerable to counterattack for a short period.

Players may also use two special abilities, both of which require time to recharge after use. Tapping the icon on the top left unleashes the Super Attack, which stuns the opponent temporarily. Super Attacks are recharged by giving and receiving damage. Magic is activated by tapping the icon on the top right, and then drawing a magical symbol corresponding to a certain spell. The proper symbols appear onscreen after the magic button is tapped. Available spells are determined by the magic rings a player has equipped. Magic recharges over time. As a player's magic stat increases, the amount of time it takes their magic gauge to refill decreases.

Swiping in particular patterns unleashes a combo, which is a powered-up sword hit. When using a light weapon, swiping left, right, left, or the opposite, unleashes a huge hit; left, left, right, right (or the opposite, right, right, left, left) performs a Mega Hit; left, right, up down, left performs an Ultra Hit, the highest combo. Combos with heavy weapons are performed by swiping twice in the same direction, then swiping a third time following the direction of the onscreen instruction. Combos with light weapons are performed by swiping left, right, and then left again (or the opposite pattern) more slowly and continuing the pattern.

In addition to combat, there is also a mild role-playing element. An experience points system levels up the player and the player's equipment, which consists of weapons, armor, shields, helms, and magic rings. Pieces of equipment have special properties and a predetermined number of experience points required to master them. Mastering a piece of equipment increases its sale value but prevents the player from receiving any further experience points from using that weapon. Players gain skill points when their level increases or they master a piece of equipment; these points can be spent to improve the character's base health, attack, shield power and magic stats. Players can purchase new equipment using in-game money taken from the castle or from defeated enemies. New to Infinity Blade II is a system of equipment modification through gems, which can imbue weapons with attributes. A gem can be attached to a piece of equipment if there is a correctly shaped slot for it, and unattached for a varying fee. The player may choose to forge several gems together to create an even more powerful gem - a process that is free, but takes a certain amount of real-world time to complete. The forging process can also be completed immediately with a variable payment.

Infinity Blade also features a NewGame+ mode which can be entered after the player beats the God King for the first time. Upon entering, the player loses all equipments in the game which have been purchased beforehand. They also lose their gems and their gold, except for the IAP Gold (golds which are purchased through IAP). This mode allows the player to re-master their equipments (with an adjusted EXP limit of each items) and therefore theoretically able to gain infinite EXP (and stats points), unlike the normal mode (called the "OG" Original Game mode) which does not allow players to re-master equipments, thus they cannot progress further once all equipments are mastered. A NewGame+ is indicated by an exponential number above the rebirth value of each rebirth. The number increases as the player delves into deeper NewGame+ mode. After the player beats the God King in the NewGame+, the player loses everything and starts everything all over again in a deeper NewGame+.

As in the first Infinity Blade, chests are hidden in certain areas of the game. However, in this game, there are different levels of chests that require different sized keys, ranging from small to medium and large. Chest types are indicated by a colored triangle symbol above the chest, the color of which identifies the size of key required to open it.

== Plot ==
The game begins with Siris (voiced by Troy Baker), the main character, and his companion Isa (voiced by Laura Bailey) arriving at a Japanese-themed estate owned by Saydhi, one of the Deathless and an information dealer. Isa appeals to Siris not to go further, but when he persists, she reluctantly explains that Saydhi will answer one question if he can fight his way to her by defeating her champions. Once he does, Saydhi offers him a place as one of her champions. Siris refuses and instead asks her where the Worker of Secrets is. Suddenly suspicious, Saydhi tells Siris where to find the Worker, but attacks him immediately. Once Siris defeats her, he notices a pedestal with a keyhole that fits the Infinity Blade. He proceeds to slide the sword in it, and the pedestal disappears into the ground.

Suddenly, Raidriar (voiced by Alastair Duncan), The God King, appears behind Siris clutching the Infinity Blade. Calling Siris "Ausar", the God King takes the blade and prepares to stab Siris. However, before he can deal the fatal blow, Isa appears on a rooftop and shoots Siris in the head with a crossbow, killing him abruptly. The God King lays down the blade in frustration.

Siris awakes on a cot in an industrial-looking chamber, naked save for a loin cloth, realizing that he too is a Deathless. He journeys to a tall castle, reminiscent of the one from the first game, though this one is crumbling. He battles his way into the tower and up to the top floor where he finds Thane, High Lord of House Ix, sitting before a round seal in the floor showing a great tree. When Siris defeats him and moves to break the seal, Thane warns that Siris will lose his life in the process. Siris reveals his immortality to Thane before breaking the seal and dying.

Again, Siris wakes in the chamber, apparently unscathed. He returns to the castle again and battles his way through. He must now defeat three 'Blood Sentinels': the Archivist (voiced by Jim Cummings), in the library; the Stone Demon, beneath the arena; and a mortal (Exo-Pilot) who guards the seals with an MX-Goliath, a large robotic warrior suit. After he defeats each, Siris unlocks another seal, dying each time and being reborn in the mysterious chamber.

After unlocking all the seals, Siris proceeds to the top of the tower once more, where he again finds Thane, who, like Siris, is a Deathless. The two duel once again. When Siris defeats Thane, he unlocks the final seal in the floor, opening the way to the Vault of Tears where Galath, the Worker of Secrets (voiced by Simon Templeman) is imprisoned. But before he can speak to him, Thane appears once more and again battles Siris. This time, the Worker of Secrets disrupts the fight by placing a hand on Thane's back. The lord dies immediately. The Worker explains that he has disrupted Thane's Quantum Identity Pattern, 'granting' him a true death. The Worker thanks Siris for coming, but explains that he can only be freed if another takes his place in the prison. He appeals to Siris to find Raidriar, defeat him once again, and bring him to the Vault. Siris reluctantly promises to do so.

Siris journeys back to Saydhi's estate and rings a gigantic bell while calling out a challenge to the God King. Raidriar soon appears and sends three minions after him. When Siris defeats them, he engages the God King in battle once more. Finally, Siris knocks him out with a swift blow to the head and brings him back to the Worker of Secrets's eternal prison. There, Siris dumps his still unconscious body and prepares to leave the cell with the Worker by stabbing the Infinity Blade into the seal. When the Worker grabs onto the sword, a blue light blasts Siris away. He reveals that it was actually Siris who imprisoned him, not The God King, back when he was known as the Deathless Ausar. Weak and disoriented, Siris watches as the Worker escapes with The Infinity Blade, leaving him locked up in the Vault with Raidriar, yelling in anger and regret.

In an expansion set, Siris seeks to discover his unknown past as Ausar the Vile, an evil and powerful Deathless who were feared by his friends and foes. He collected various maps which revealed to him several pieces of equipments. These equipments were scattered in various places, and some of them were guarded by vicious enemies. These equipments were the Vile Blade, the Vile Mace, the Vile Swords, the Vile Armor, the Vile Helmet, and the Vile Shield. The Vile equipments were once used by Siris when he was once known as Ausar. After obtaining all the Vile equipments, Siris journeyed back into the tower and entered a sacred underground tomb with TEL, his robotic canine-like servant. He found a statue of a man who wore the Vile set, stabbing a woman who was presumed to be his wife. Light shone from above the statue and Siris found a glowing ring, which was then claimed to be his magic ring, the Holy Band. Another expansion also featured a new roster of characters, the Petrified Noc, the Iron Hunter, and Xyloto who were locked in the Skycages on top of the Tower. After freeing them, all of them battled Siris, attempting to end his life. The Petrified Noc and Xyloto were killed by Siris, however the Iron Hunter could be spared. If he was spared, he would appear in the beginning of the next rebirth. Instead of fighting Siris, he gave Siris a heavy weapon named "Torren's Legacy", entrusting him with the bladed mace to fight the Deathless.

In a post-credits scene, Isa is shown walking toward the castle, presumably to rescue Siris from the Vault of Tears.

== Development ==
Infinity Blade II was created by Chair Entertainment, a subsidiary company of Epic Games. The game was first announced on October 4, 2011, during the Apple iPhone 4S Presentation Keynote. It was subsequently released on December 1, 2011. The game is fully compatible with iPhone models 3GS and later, 3rd generation and later iPod Touch, and the iPad. However, it runs in higher resolution when played on the iPhone 4 and the 4th generation iPod Touch, taking advantage of the Retina Display, and smoother on the iPhone 4S thanks to its A5 processor. Using the 2nd and 3rd generation iPads, it's possible to output the game to an external device such as a TV or monitor in 1080p resolution. The game received multiple major updates. The first update for the game added a social feature called "Clashmobs", available to players who log in through Facebook. A Clashmob is a "massively social global challenge" - that is, a collection of players all working individually to complete a single goal. If enough players complete the quest, successful participants are rewarded with items such as gold, armor, and weapons. The game had a critical bug affecting many players where the game reset and the current experience, level and equipment were lost after varying amounts of time. As of the 1.0.2 update, the save bug was fixed. Several objects and equipment add-ons have been released in the game store. The "Vault of Tears" update was released for free with version 1.2 of the game on May 24, 2012, adding new maps, enemies, story cinematics, gems, treasure maps, and weapons to the main campaign. The update included more new equipment, enemies, gems, and a "treasure map" feature. The 1.3 Update "Skycages" was later released on August 2, 2012, which further expanded the types of enemies, introduced new weapons including the "Solar Transport Energy Blades", items, gems, and a new location featuring 3 boss battles.

== Reception ==
Reception

Aggregate score
Aggregator	Score
Metacritic	89/100

Review scores
Publication	Score
GameSpot	9/10
IGN	10/10
TouchArcade	5/5

Infinity Blade II garnered critical acclaim from many major video game critics. It received a perfect score of 10/10 from IGN's Justin Davis (making it the first iOS game to do so), who stated that it is a "must own." GameSpot gave the game a score of 9/10, calling it "the perfect sequel."

During the 15th Annual Interactive Achievement Awards, the Academy of Interactive Arts & Sciences awarded Infinity Blade II with "Mobile Game of the Year".
