= IPhone 4s =

2011 smartphone by Apple

iPhone 4s
- iPhone 4s logos, iPhone 4-era logo (top) iPhone 5s-era logo (bottom)

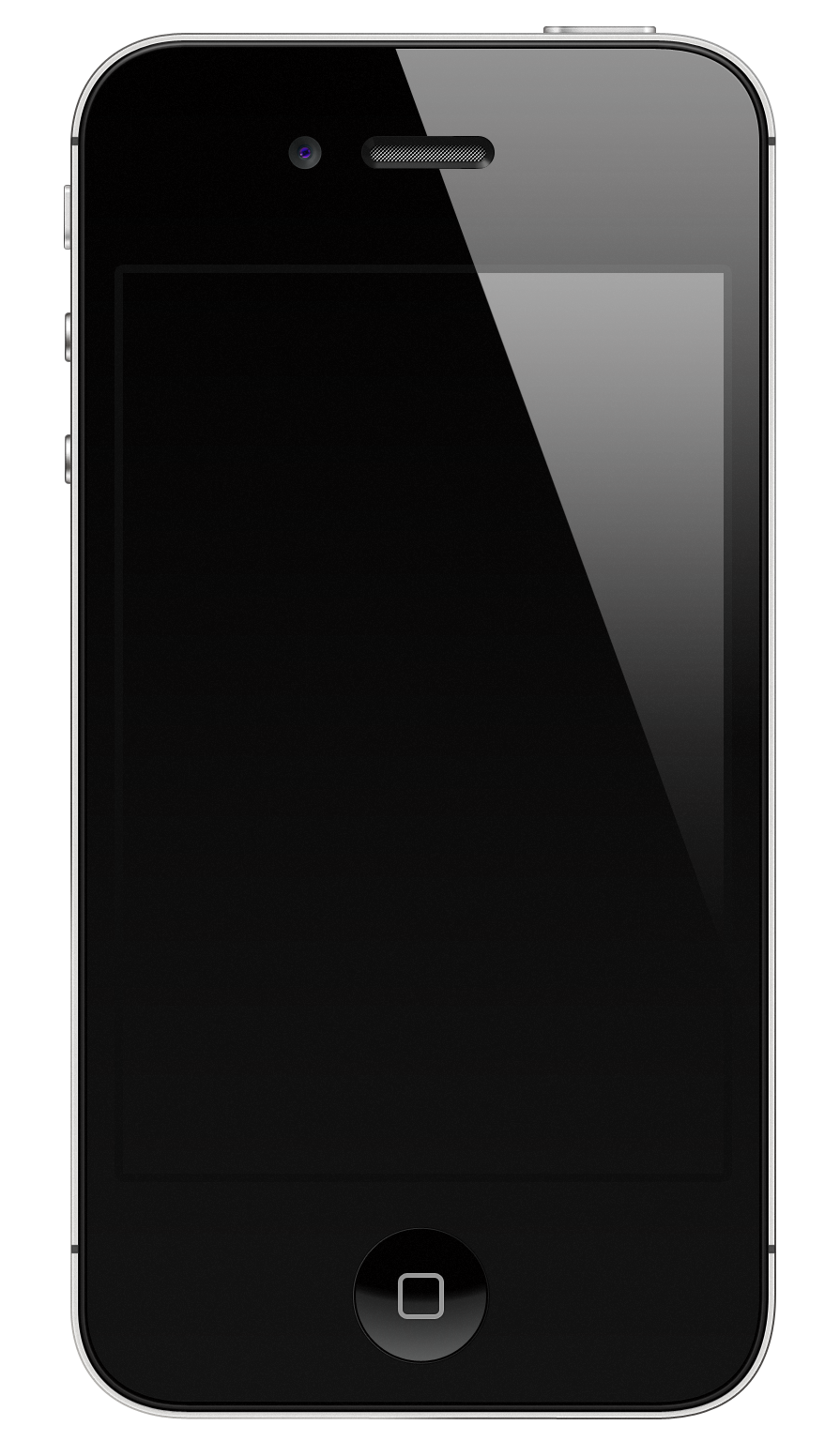
- iPhone 4s in Black
- Developer: Apple
- Type: Smartphone
- First released: October 14, 2011; 15 years ago
- Availability by region: October 14, 2011: Germany; Canada; France; United States; Japan; Australia; United Kingdom; Egypt; October 28, 2011: Austria; Belgium; Czech Republic; Denmark; Eritrea; Estonia; Finland; Hungary; Ireland; Italy; Latvia; Liechtenstein; Lithuania; Luxembourg; Mexico; Netherlands; Norway; Singapore; Slovakia; Slovenia; Spain; Sudan; Sweden; Switzerland; November 11, 2011: Albania; Armenia; Bulgaria; El Salvador; Greece; Guatemala; Hong Kong; South Korea; Malta; Montenegro; New Zealand; Panama; Poland; Portugal; Romania; South Korea (non-contract); November 25, 2011: Colombia; Moldova; India; Croatia; December 16, 2011: Brazil; Chile; Malaysia; Philippines; Russia; Saudi Arabia; South Africa; Taiwan; Thailand; Turkey; United Arab Emirates; Vietnam; Kuwait; Bahrain; Israel; January 13, 2012: Anguilla; Antigua and Barbuda; Bolivia; Botswana; British Virgin Islands; Cameroon; Cayman Islands; Central African Republic; China; Dominica; Dominican Republic; Ecuador; Grenada; Guam; Guinea Conakry; Ivory Coast; Jamaica; Kenya; Madagascar; Mali; Mauritius; Niger; Senegal; St. Vincent and The Grenadines; Trinidad and Tobago; Turks and Caicos; Uganda; Jordan; Venezuela; Lebanon; January 27, 2012: Costa Rica; Indonesia
- Discontinued: 32 GB and 64 GB: September 12, 2012; 14 years ago 16 GB: September 10, 2013; 13 years ago 8 GB: September 9, 2014; 12 years ago (outside India); February 17, 2016; 10 years ago (India); July 22, 2019; 7 years ago (iOS update support date)
- Units sold: Four million in first three days of initial sales (October 14–17, 2011); 60+ million total
- Predecessor: iPhone 4
- Successor: iPhone 5
- Related: iPod Touch (5th generation)
- Compatible networks: GSM, CDMA, 3G, 3G+, HSUPA 4G
- Form factor: Slate
- Dimensions: 115.2 mm (4.54 in) H 58.6 mm (2.31 in) W 9.3 mm (0.37 in) D
- Weight: 140 g (4.9 oz)
- Operating system: Original: iOS 5.0; Last: iOS 9.3.6, released July 22, 2019; 7 years ago
- System-on-chip: Dual-core Apple A5
- Memory: 512 MB DDR2 RAM
- Storage: 8, 16, 32, or 64 GB
- Battery: 3.7 V, 5.3 W⋅h (~1430 mA⋅h) Lithium-ion battery
- Rear camera: Sony Exmor R IMX145 8 MP back-side illuminated sensor HD video (1080p) at 30 frame/s IR filter Aperture f/2.4 5 element lens Image signal processor (built-in A5); Face detection (stills only) image stabilization
- Front camera: 0.3 MP VGA (480p)
- Display: 3.5 in (89 mm) diagonal 3:2 aspect ratio widescreen LED backlit IPS TFT LCD; 960×640 Resolution at 326 ppi 800:1 contrast ratio (typical); 500 cd/m^{2} max. brightness (typical); Fingerprint-resistant oleophobic coating on front and back glass
- Sound: Single loudspeaker 3.5 mm TRRS, 20 Hz to 20 kHz frequency response (internal, headset); 3.5mm audio jack
- Connectivity: Wi-Fi (802.11 b/g/n) (2.4 GHz only); Bluetooth 4.0; Combined GSM/CDMA antenna: quad-band GSM/GPRS/EDGE (800 850 900 1800 1900 MHz); Quad-band UMTS/HSDPA/HSUPA (800 850 900 1900 2100 MHz) (800 MHz unannounced); Dual-band CDMA/EV-DO Rev. A (800 1900 MHz); GLONASS, Global Positioning System (GPS)
- Data inputs: Multi-touch touchscreen display Dual microphone 3-axis gyroscope 3-axis accelerometer Digital compass Proximity sensor Ambient light sensor
- Made in: China
- Website: Apple – iPhone 4s – The most amazing iPhone yet at the Wayback Machine (archived November 21, 2011)

The iPhone 4s (Note: The phone was originally named the iPhone 4S, but the 's' was changed to lowercase in September 2013.) is a smartphone that was developed and marketed by Apple. It is the fifth generation of the iPhone, succeeding the iPhone 4 and preceding the iPhone 5. It was announced on October 4, 2011, at Apple's Cupertino campus, and was the final Apple product announced in the lifetime of former Apple CEO and co-founder Steve Jobs, who died the following day. It is also the first Apple product to be introduced without Steve Jobs.

Orders could be placed on October 7, 2011, and mainstream availability in retail stores began on October 14, 2011, in the United States, Australia, Canada, the United Kingdom, France, Germany, and Japan. Sales peaked over its predecessor with more than a million sales in the first 24 hours of order availability and more than four million sales in the first four days of retail availability. Further worldwide rollout, including 22 additional countries on October 28, came during the next several months.

This iPhone was named "4s" where the "s" stood for Siri, (Note: Apple CEO Tim Cook confirmed that the S stood for Siri during the Q&A session at the D10 conference in May 2012.) an intelligent personal assistant that was initially exclusive to the 4s and later included in future Apple products. Retaining most of the external design of the iPhone 4, the 4s hosted major internal upgrades, including an upgrade to the Apple A5 chipset, and an 8-megapixel camera with 1080p video recording. It debuted with iOS 5, the fifth major version of iOS, Apple's mobile operating system, that introduced features including iCloud, iMessage, Notification Center, Reminders, and Twitter integration.

Reception to the iPhone 4s was favorable. Reviewers noted Siri, the new camera, and processing speeds as significant advantages over the prior model. It was succeeded by the iPhone 5 as Apple's flagship smartphone on September 12, 2012. The 16 GB iPhone 4s remained on sale at a reduced price point, with the 32 and 64 GB models discontinued. The 16 GB 4s was also subsequently discontinued in September 2013 with the release of the iPhone 5C and iPhone 5S and replaced with the 8 GB model which was offered free on contract in the United States.

The iPhone 4s was officially discontinued on September 9, 2014, following the announcement of the iPhone 6, although production did continue for developing markets until February 17, 2016. During the course of its lifetime, the iPhone 4s was one of the best-selling iPhones ever produced and was the first iPhone to support five major versions of iOS: iOS 5, iOS 6, iOS 7, iOS 8, and iOS 9 (the iPad 2 was supported from iOS 4 to iOS 9).

The iPhone 4s is the last iPhone to feature and use Apple's proprietary 30-pin dock connector, as the iPhone 5 and later replaced it with the Lightning connector, which itself was replaced with USB-C starting with iPhone 15 and 15 Pro models.

== Production and release ==
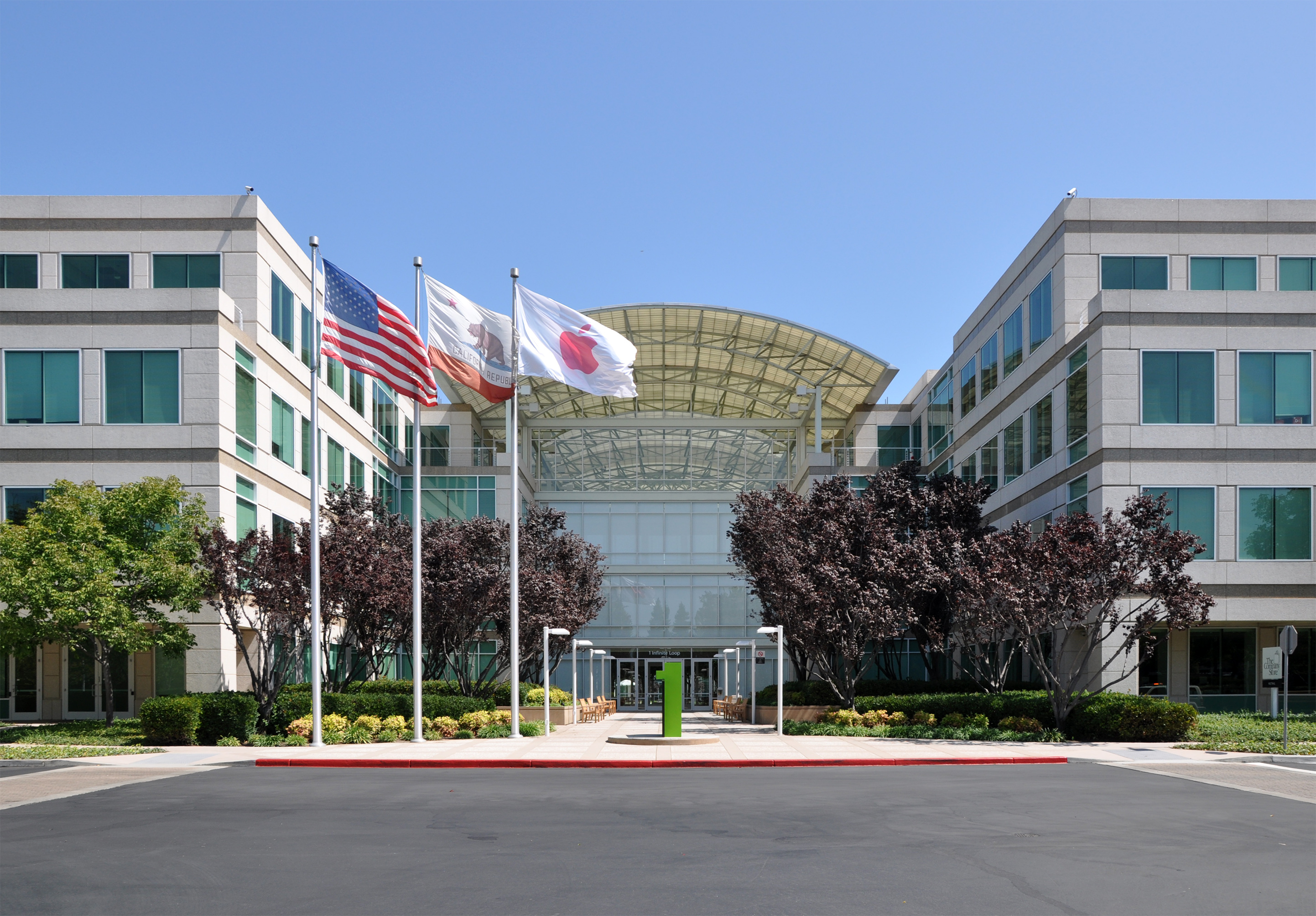
The "Let's Talk iPhone" event was held at the Apple Campus, instead of the Yerba Buena Center for the Arts, where most non-WWDC events are held.

As early as May 2011, some leaks had a fairly accurate description of the iPhone 4S including the name "iPhone 4S", the Apple A5 chip, HSDPA, new camera, and Sprint carrying.

The iPhone 4s was unveiled at Apple's "Let's Talk iPhone" event on October 4, 2011, on the Apple Campus in Cupertino, California. The keynote was the first which Tim Cook gave since the Verizon keynote earlier in the year. It was also Cook's first launch without Apple co-founder Steve Jobs, whose health was deteriorating, and he died the day after the announcement of the iPhone 4S. Tim Carmody of Wired praised Cook for focusing on company achievements, calling him a "global business thinker" and a "taskmaster".

At the "Let's Talk iPhone" event held by Apple on October 4, 2011, Mike Capps demonstrated Epic Games' Infinity Blade II, the sequel to Infinity Blade, on an iPhone 4s. Capps boasted that the game uses Epic Games' Unreal Engine 3 and features the same graphic techniques used in the Xbox 360 game Gears of War 3.

Speculation about Apple's next generation smartphone, including various specifications and a predicted name "iPhone 5", had been widespread in the time preceding its debut. After the iPhone 4S was announced, it was considered by some media to be a disappointment, due to the expected release of an iPhone 5.

There were no external differences between the iPhone 4 CDMA model and the iPhone 4s, with the exception of a SIM card slot on the iPhone 4s. All changes were internal (slight external differences between the iPhone 4 GSM model and the iPhone 4s exist, as said differences existed between the CDMA and GSM models of the iPhone 4).

On September 10, 2013, the iPhone 4S name was re-stylised as iPhone 4s, using a lower case 's' to reflect the names of the newly announced iPhone 5s and iPhone 5c. This was unusual for Apple as an upper case 'S' had been used since the introduction of the iPhone 3GS in 2009.

On September 9, 2014, the iPhone 4s was officially discontinued following the reveal of iPhone 6 and iPhone 6 Plus. However, The iPhone 4s remained on sale in India until February, 2016.

On September 13, 2016, following the release of iOS 10, Apple dropped support for the iPhone 4s, making iOS 9 the last major iOS version available for the device.

Release dates
October 14, 2011	October 28, 2011	November 11, 2011	November 25, 2011	December 16, 2011	January 13, 2012
Australia; Canada; France; Germany; Japan; United Kingdom; United States	Austria; Belgium; Czech Republic; Denmark; Estonia; Finland; Hungary; Ireland; Italy; Latvia; Liechtenstein; Lithuania; Luxembourg; Mexico; Netherlands; Norway; Singapore; Slovakia; Slovenia; Spain; Sweden; Switzerland	Albania; Armenia; Bulgaria; El Salvador; Greece; Guatemala; Hong Kong; Malta; Montenegro; New Zealand; Panama; Poland; Portugal; Romania; South Korea (non-contract)	Colombia; Croatia; India; Moldova	Bahrain; Brazil; Chile; Israel; Kuwait; Malaysia; Philippines; Russia; Saudi Arabia; South Africa; Taiwan; Thailand; Turkey; United Arab Emirates	Anguilla; Antigua and Barbuda; Bolivia; Botswana; British Virgin Islands; Cameroon; Cayman Islands; Central African Republic; China; Dominica; Dominican Republic; Ecuador; Grenada; Guam; Guinea; Ivory Coast; Jamaica; Jordan; Kenya; Lebanon; Madagascar; Mali; Mauritius; Niger; Senegal; St. Vincent and The Grenadines; Trinidad and Tobago; Turks and Caicos; Uganda; Venezuela

== Software ==
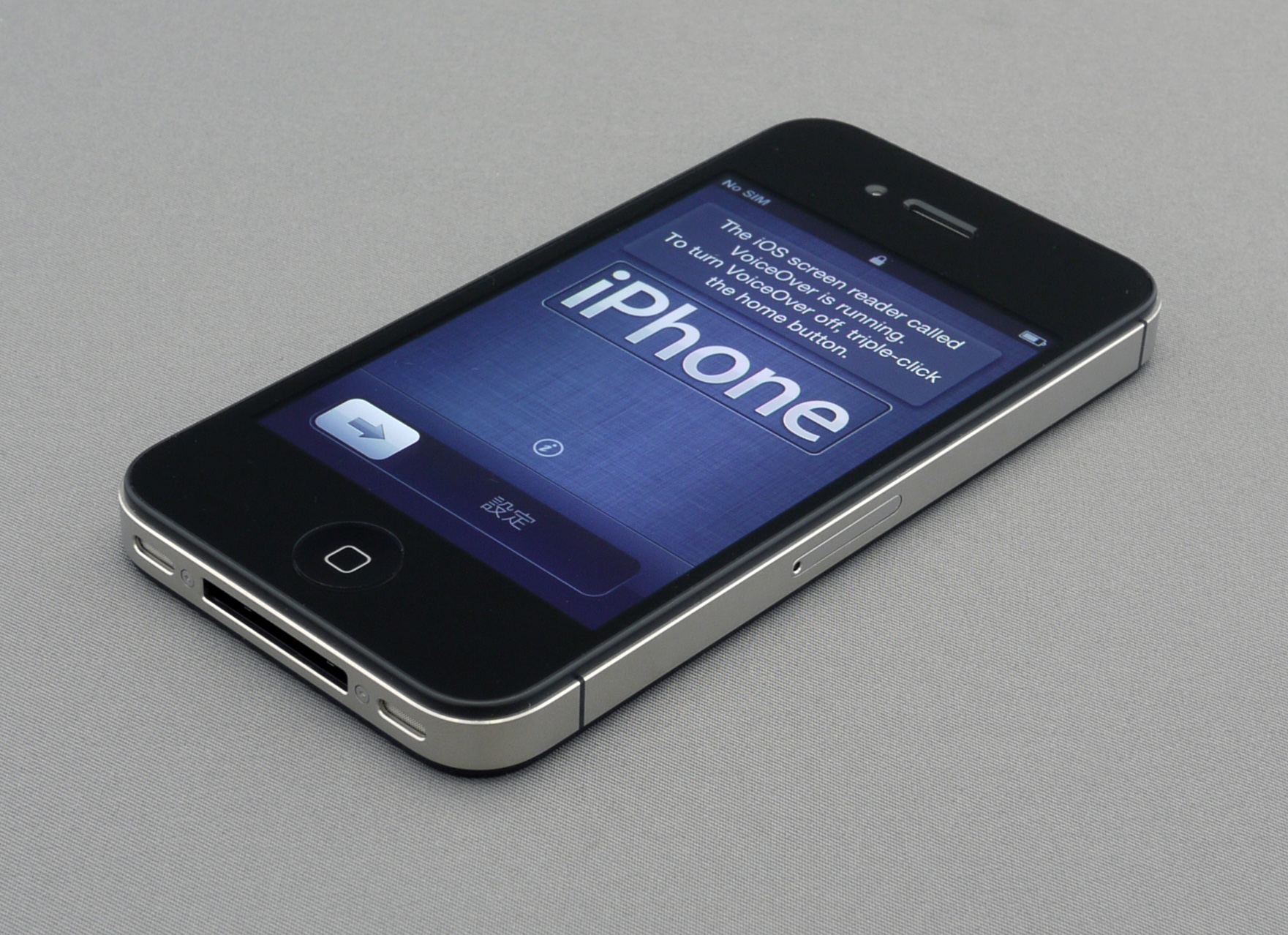
The iPhone 4s setup screen – it is the first iPhone that does not need to connect to iTunes in order to be activated because iOS 5 introduces features such as iCloud.

The iPhone 4s, like other iPhones, runs iOS, Apple's mobile operating system. The user interface of iOS is based on the concept of direct manipulation, using multi-touch gestures. Interface control elements consist of sliders, switches, and buttons. The response to user input is immediate and provides a fluid interface. Interaction with the OS includes gestures such as swipe, tap, pinch, and reverse pinch, all of which have specific definitions within the context of the iOS operating system and its multi-touch interface.

Internal accelerometers are used by some applications to respond to shaking the device (one common result is the undo command) or rotating it in three dimensions (one common result is switching from portrait to landscape mode).

The iPhone 4s was first shipped with iOS 5.0, which was released on October 12, 2011, two days before the release of the device. As of March 2026, the device can be updated to iOS 9.

It can act as a hotspot, sharing its internet connection over WiFi, Bluetooth, or USB, and also accesses the App Store, a digital application distribution platform for iOS developed and maintained by Apple. The service allows users to browse and download applications from the iTunes Store that were developed with Xcode and the iOS SDK and were published through Apple.

The iPhone 4s can play music, movies, television shows, ebooks, audiobooks, and podcasts and can sort its media library by songs, artists, albums, videos, playlists, genres, composers, podcasts, audiobooks, and compilations. Options are always presented alphabetically, except in playlists, which retain their order from iTunes. The iPhone 4s uses a large font that allows users plenty of room to touch their selection. Users can rotate their device horizontally to landscape mode to access Cover Flow. Like on iTunes, this feature shows the different album covers in a scroll-through its photograph library. Scrolling is achieved by swiping a finger across the screen. Alternatively, headset controls can be used to pause, play, skip, and repeat tracks. On the 4s, the volume can be changed with the included Apple Earphones, and the Voice Control feature can be used to identify a track, play songs in a playlist or by a specific artist, or create a Genius playlist.

The iPhone 4s introduced a new automated voice control system called Siri, that allows the user to give the iPhone commands, which it can execute and respond to. For example, iPhone commands such as "What is the weather going to be like?" will generate a response such as "The weather is to be cloudy and rainy and drop to 54 degrees today." These commands can vary greatly and control almost every application of the smartphone. The commands given do not have to be specific and can be used with natural language. Siri can be accessed by holding down the home button for a short amount of time (compared to using the regular function). An impact of Siri, as shown by Apple video messages, is that it is much easier for people to use device functions while driving, exercising, or when they have their hands full. It also means people with trouble reading, seeing, or typing can access the smartphone more easily.

On the iPhone 4s, texting can be aided by the voice assistant, which allows speech-to-text. In addition to regular texting, messaging on the iPhone 4s is supported by iMessage, a specialized instant messaging program and service that allows unlimited texting to other Apple iOS 5 products. This supports the inclusion of media in text messages, integration with the device's voice-controlled software assistant, and read receipts for sent messages. Input to the computer comes from a keyboard displayed on the multi-touch screen or by voice-to-text by speaking into the microphone. Entered text is supported by predictive and suggestion software as well as a spell-checker, that includes many regional dialects such as Swiss spoken French.

At the announcement, plans were in place for the iPhone 4s to support many languages. Different features have different language requirements, such as keyboards compared to the word predictor and spell-checker, which needs a large dictionary of words. Language support is related to the iOS 5 operating system that the device launched with, although not always. The Siri digital assistant supported French, English, and German at launch. Since it uses a software-based keyboard supported by the multi-touch display, it can support many different keyboard layouts without having to change physically. The iPhone 4s can display different languages and scripts at the same time.

On September 19, 2012, iOS 6 was released to the iPhone 4s among other compatible iOS devices as an over the air (OTA) upgrade package. According to Apple the update contained 200 new features and tweaks, which included a new maps app (dubbed Apple Maps), Facebook integration, and Passbook, an application that allows users to store their coupons, boarding passes, and tickets digitally. On September 18, 2013, Apple released iOS 7, although some features that were released to newer devices such as AirDrop and CarPlay were not supported on the iPhone 4s. The iPhone 4s can also run iOS 8, which was released on September 17, 2014. Due to the aged hardware, the iPhone 4s was not compatible with the Apple Watch.

On June 8, 2015, Apple announced at the WWDC that the iPhone 4s would support iOS 9. This makes it the first iPhone to support five major versions of iOS, and the second iOS device to support five major versions, after the iPad 2. On December 22, 2015, Apple faced a class action lawsuit alleging that they had knowingly slowed down iPhone 4s devices with iOS 9. The lawsuit was settled in 2022.

On June 13, 2016, Apple confirmed that the iPhone 4s would not support iOS 10 due to hardware limitations, exactly like the iPad 2.

On July 22, 2019, Apple released iOS 9.3.6 for the iPhone 4s to fix issues caused by the GPS week number rollover. The issues would impact the accuracy of GPS location and set the device's date and time to an incorrect value, preventing connection to HTTPS servers and, consequently, Apple's servers for activation, iCloud and the iTunes and App stores.

== Hardware ==
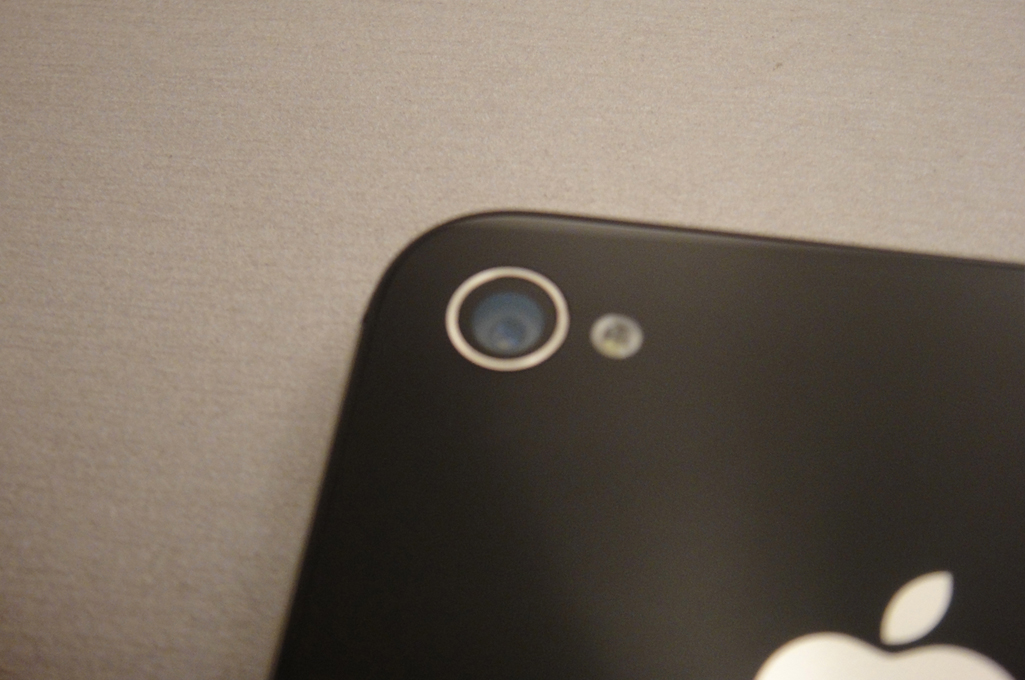
The iPhone 4s features a Sony 8-megapixel camera and 1080p video recording.

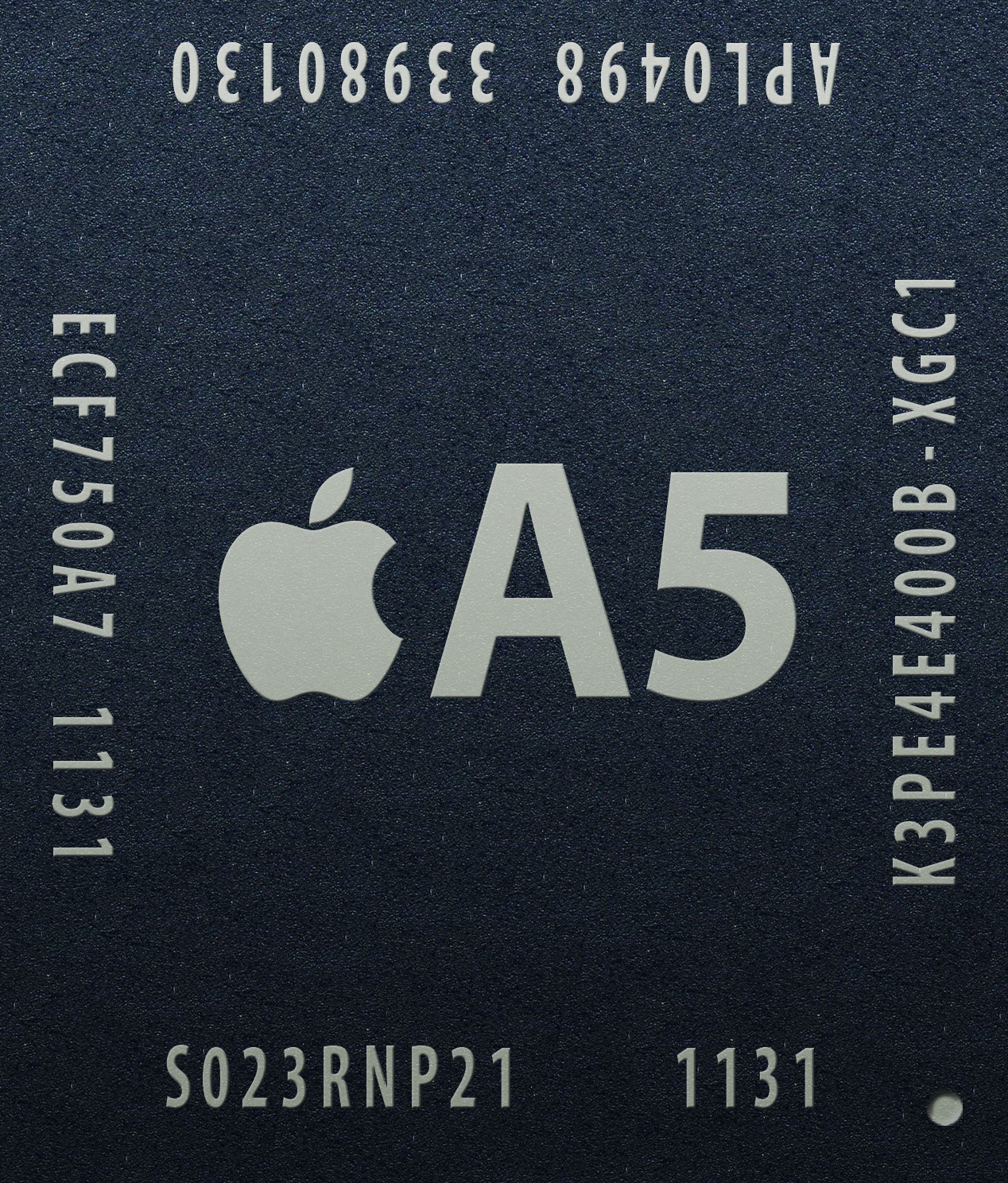
Apple A5 chip used in the iPhone 4s

The iPhone 4s uses the Apple A5 system-on-chip (SoC), also found in the iPad Mini (1st generation), that incorporates an Imagination Technologies PowerVR SGX543 graphics processing unit (GPU). This GPU features pixel, vertex, and geometry shader hardware supporting OpenGL ES 2.0. The SGX543 is an improved version of the GPU used in the iPhone 4s predecessor, the iPhone 4. The iPhone 4s uses a dual-core model that is integrated with the Apple A5 SoC in the same way as the iPad 2. Apple claims that the iPhone 4s has up to seven times faster graphics than the iPhone 4; this was corroborated by Epic Games president Mike Capps.

The iPhone 4s has 512 MB of DDR2 RAM. Maximum available storage size increased to 64 GB while the 32 GB and 16 GB model options were retained. In September 2013 Apple released an iPhone 4s for free with a two-year contract, but with only 8 GB of storage.

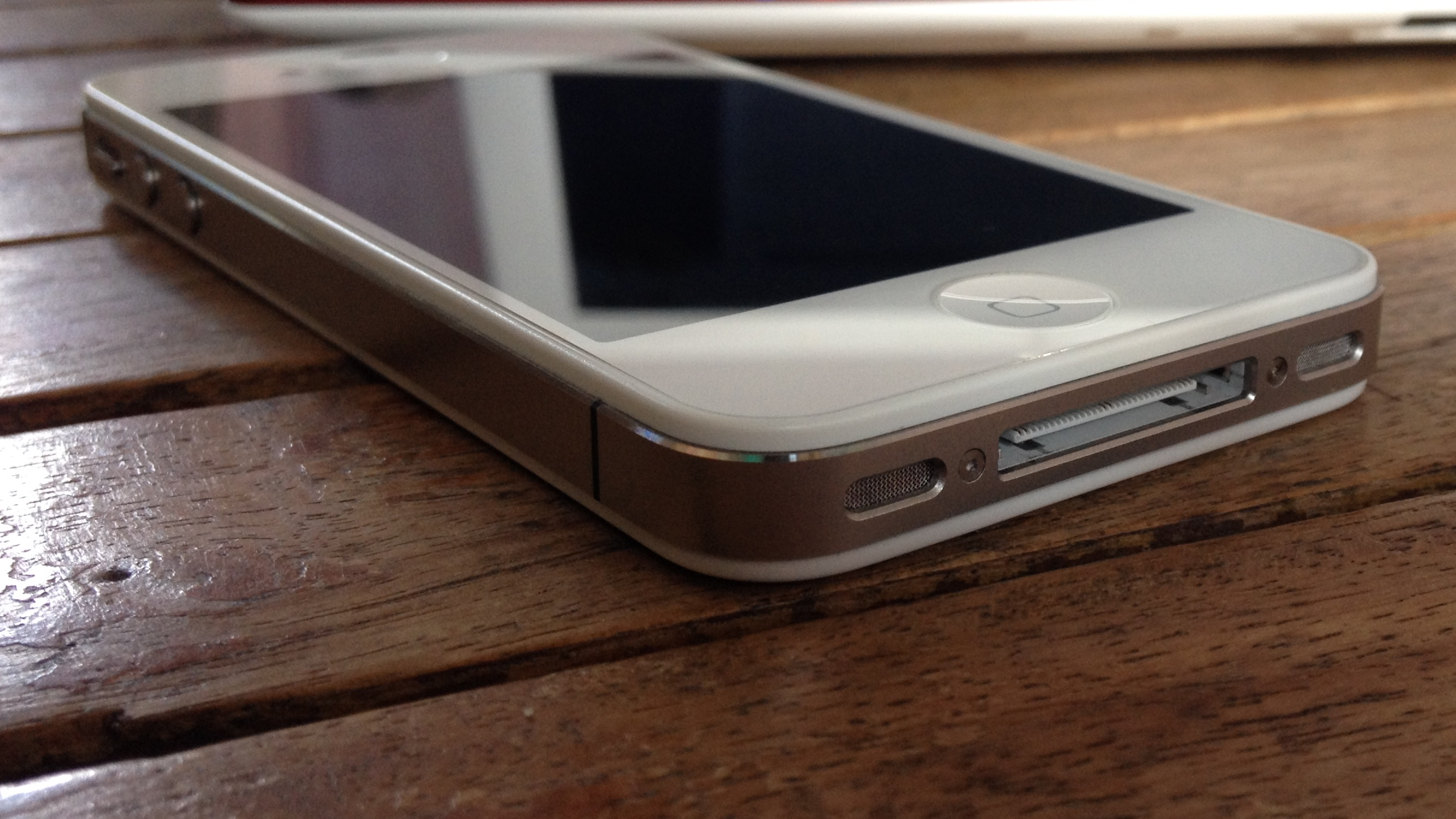
The iPhone 4s uses the same proprietary 30-pin dock connector that is used on the iPhone 4, which was first introduced in the 3rd generation iPod.

The iPhone 4s has an improved cellular (GSM) antenna design over the iPhone 4. The new antenna is divided up into two pieces within the stainless steel band that wraps around the sides of the smartphone. Therefore, if the iPhone 4s is gripped in such a way as to attenuate one piece of the cellular antenna, the radio will switch to the other piece that isn't being gripped. The iPhone 4s can support a maximum theoretical download speed of up to 14.4 Mbps with HSDPA+. As a result of an upgraded radio chip inside it, in addition to being a world phone, both GSM and CDMA customers can roam internationally on GSM networks. It also supports Bluetooth 4.0.

The camera on the iPhone 4s, also known as an iSight camera, can take 8-megapixel photographs (3,264 by 2,448 pixels) and record 1080p videos at up to 30 frames per second with upgraded quality (30% better clarity, 26% better white balance, color accuracy) due to an additional lens, IR filter, a wider f/2.4 aperture, and Image signal processor (built-in A5).

The built-in gyroscope allows for some image stabilization for the camera while recording video, although it still has room for improvement, since state-of-the-art image stabilization algorithms do not need to use a gyroscope, but use image processing. Other features of the camera are macro (for close up pictures) and faster capture including being able to take its first image in 1.1 seconds and the next half a second later.

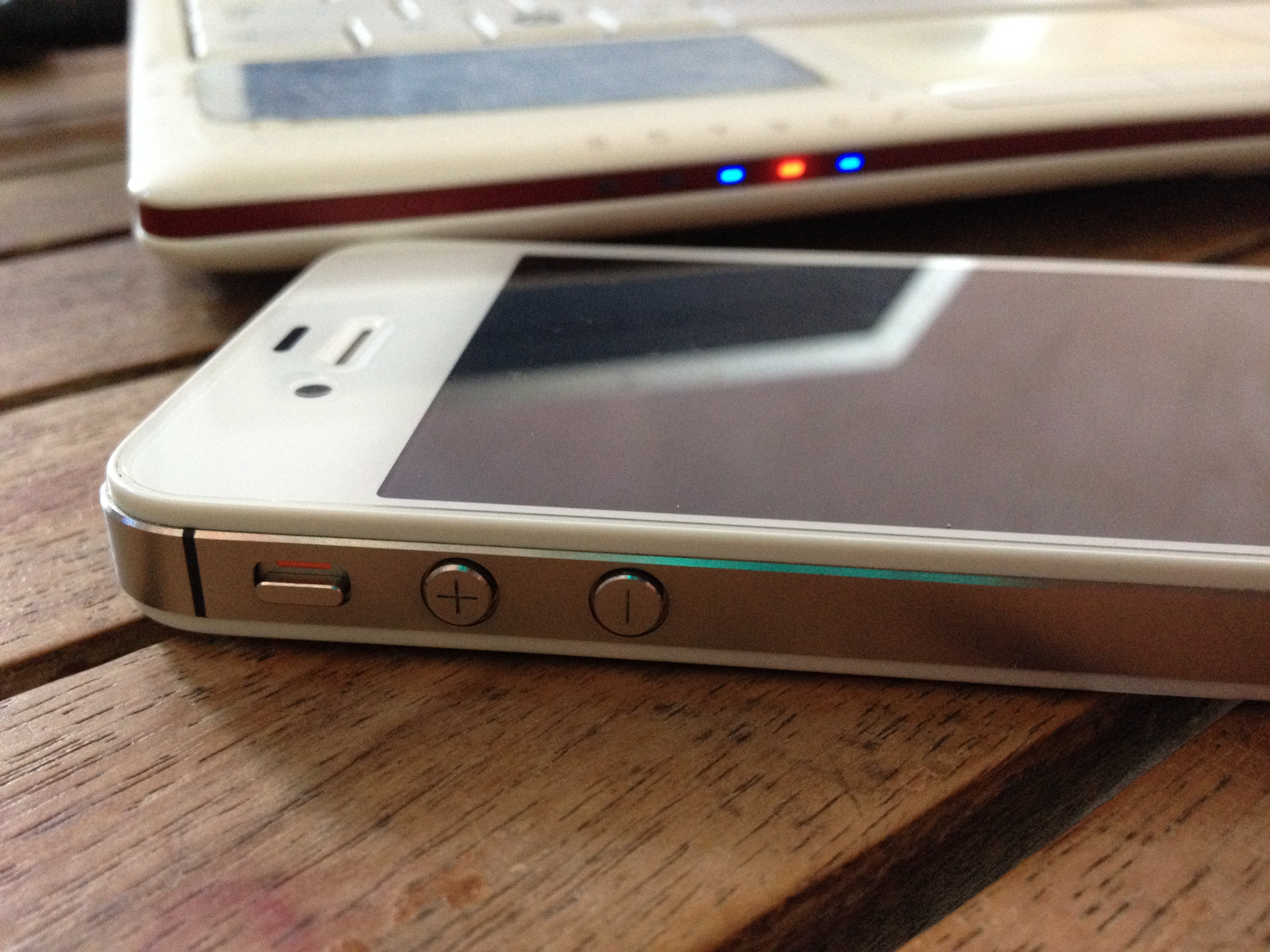
There is a line on top of the earpiece of a white iPhone 4s that is the proximity sensor. This is included on the black model as well, but is less visible.

The iPhone 4s features the same screen as the iPhone 4, a 3.5 in (89 millimetres) 640 by 960 pixel multitouch Retina display. There was an improvement in interactive multimedia applications compared to its predecessor. It has two volume buttons and a ring-silent switch on the left side. On the top left there is a 3.5 mm headphone jack and a microphone that is used for both noise cancellation during calls and when in speakerphone/FaceTime (video calling) mode. The lock-power button is situated on the top right edge of the device. The right side of the device has a Micro-SIM card slot. The bottom of the device features a speaker output on the right and a microphone input on the left with the Apple proprietary 30-pin dock connector in the center. The iPhone 4s supports video out via AirPlay and various Apple A/V cables. Supported video formats include H.264 (1080p 30 frames per second maximum), MPEG-4 video, and motion JPEG (M-JPEG).

In addition to user inputs, the device also has several sensors that give the smartphone information about its orientation and external conditions. These include a three-axis gyroscope, an accelerometer, a proximity sensor, and an ambient light sensor. The iPhone 4s claimed to have 200 hours standby time, 8 hours talk time on 3G, 14 hours talk time on 2G, 6 hours 3G browsing, and 9 hours Wi-Fi browsing. Additionally, it can sustain up to 10 hours of video playback or 40 hours of audio playback.

=== Design ===
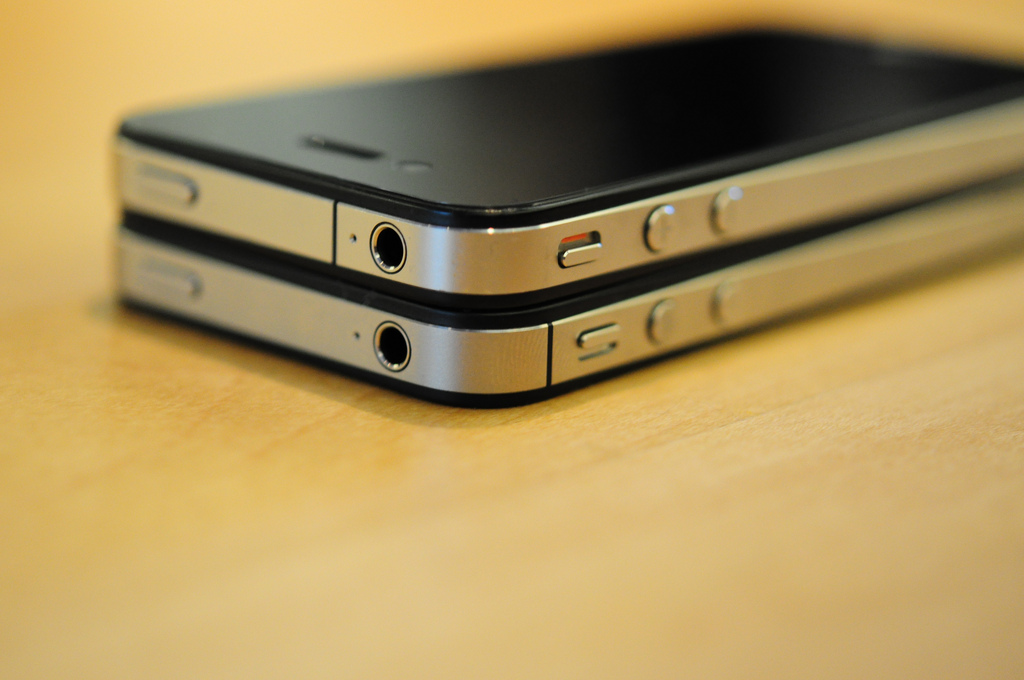
Comparison of the iPhone 4 (GSM) antenna placement (top) with that of the iPhone 4s (bottom). Notice the repositioning of the antennas that forms the perimeter around the smartphone; the iPhone 4 antenna is on the top of it while on the iPhone 4s, the antennas are on the sides. This side antenna placement meant a benefit of cellular signal attenuation and was used in later models such as the iPhone 5.

The iPhone 4s has a stainless steel, dual cellular antenna design, identical to iPhone 4 CDMA. Apple redesigned the antenna in the iPhone 4 CDMA after some original iPhone 4 users reported cellular signal attenuation problems as a result of holding it in certain positions. The improved cellular radio in the smartphone can switch between two antennas, depending on which is sending/receiving the best signal. These two antennas are incorporated into the distinctive stainless steel band that wraps around the sides of the iPhone 4s. The bands on the iPhone 4s are divided into two antennas: cellular and Global Positioning System GPS, with Bluetooth and Wi-Fi reliant on an internal antenna.

The iPhone 4 and 4s were designed by Jonathan Ive. The '4' generation iPhones differ from earlier Apple designs; the rounded design of earlier iPhones has been replaced with a flat and boxlike look. The redesign reflects the utilitarianism and uniformity of existing Apple products, such as the iPad and the iMac. The overall dimensions of the iPhone 4s are lower than that of the 3GS.

It is 115 millimetres (4.5 in) high, 59 millimetres (2.3 in) wide, and 9.4 millimetres (0.37 in) deep, compared to the iPhone 3GS, which is 116 millimetres (4.6 in) high, 62 millimetres (2.4 in) wide, and 12 millimetres (0.47 in) deep; making the iPhone 4 and 4s 21.5% thinner than the 3GS. The internal components are situated between two panels of aluminosilicate glass, described by Apple as being "chemically strengthened to be 20 times stiffer and 30 times harder than plastic", theoretically allowing it to be more scratch-resistant and durable than the prior models.

== Reception ==
=== Critical reception ===
Reception to the iPhone 4s was favorable. Reviewers noted Siri, the new camera, and processing speeds as significant advantages over the prior model. Tim Stevens of Engadget said that the "iPhone 4s does everything better than the iPhone 4, but it simply doesn't do anything substantially different." Joshua Topolsky of The Verge stated that "if this were to be a car, it would be a Mercedes" and that Siri is "probably one of the most novel applications Apple has ever produced". Most reviewers thought that Siri was the most important feature on the iPhone 4s. Brian Chen of Wired said that "the fifth-generation iPhone's superb camera and speedy dual-core processor are classy additions. But Siri is the reason people should buy this phone."

Retrevo surveyed more than 1,300 U.S. consumers and reported that 71 percent of all smartphone owners were not disappointed by the new iPhone 4s, but 47 percent or almost a half of current iPhone 4 owners were; 12 percent were hoping for a bigger display, 21 percent wanted a refreshed design, and 29 percent desired 4G. Echoing technology pundits, Reuters suggested that the lack of a more radical departure from the iPhone 4 could open new market opportunities for rivals. Analyst C. K. Lu of Gartner believed that Apple no longer had the leading edge and that the 4s would only sell due to brand loyalty, as fans had been expecting an iPhone 5 with a thinner profile, edge-to-edge screen, and stronger features. These same fans had also wanted a cheaper, stripped-down iPhone 4.

Gaming on the iPhone 4s has been likened to the PlayStation Vita, that features the same SGX GPU only in a quad-core configuration, and the Nintendo 3DS handheld game consoles. Further, the iPhone 4s' ability to process 80 million polygons per second has been compared to the PlayStation 3 and the Xbox 360 home video game consoles that can process 275 million and 500 million polygons per second respectively.

Computer and Video Games's (CVG) deputy editor Andy Robinson told TechRadar that the "4s is certainly laying down some serious credibility for the iPhone as a core gaming device. Not only is it now pushing out games that simply eclipse the 3DS visually, but features like cloud saving and TV streaming support are really exciting for gamers." The senior gaming analyst at Jon Peddie Research, Ted Pollak, believes the biggest improvement to gaming on the iPhone 4s is the voice control features, noting that "one of the features that Nintendogs players loved was the ability to talk to it. There's no reason why a game like that couldn't be done on the iPhone 4s, and much more sophisticated given the voice control shown."

In 2012, the iPhone 4s won the T3 "Work Gadget of the Year" award, beating RIM's Blackberry Bold 9900, rival Samsung's Galaxy Note amongst others.

=== Issues ===
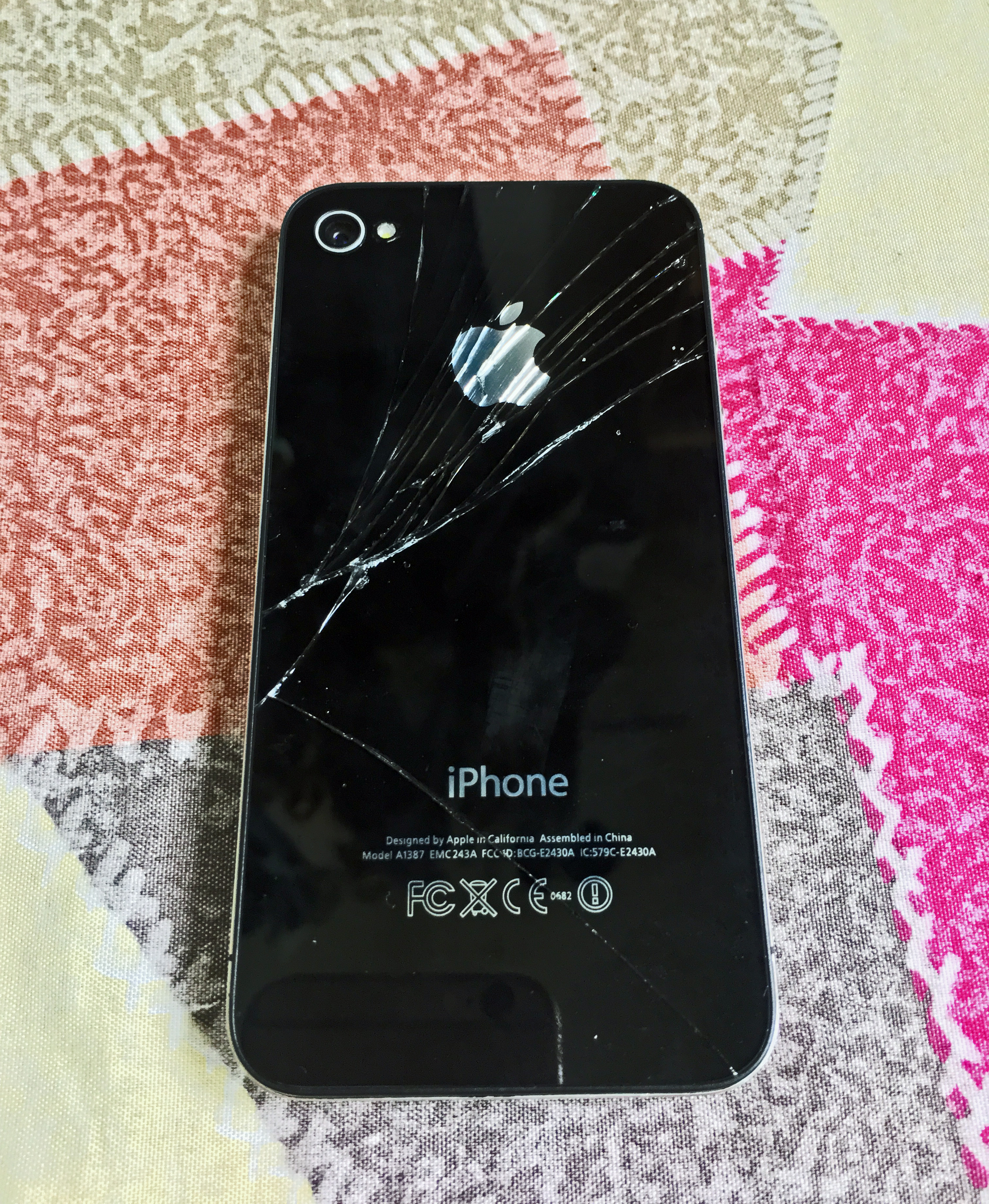
An iPhone 4s with a cracked rear cover. The glass rear covers on the iPhone 4s (along with the iPhone 4) were notorious for cracking easily after an accidental fall. A similar design (glass body with stainless-steel frame) was later reused with the introduction of the iPhone X and iPhone 8, although this second iteration of the glass-back design was for wireless charging.

Since the introduction of the iPhone 4s, there have been several issues reported by users on internet forums that have been noted by media organizations such as CNN, Boy Genius Report, The Guardian, and PC World.

- No audio on outgoing calls.
- Sometimes there is no speaker audio for services such as web radio even though the speaker works fine when used as a telephone. This error may be due to a malfunctioning switch sensing the headphone plug and different handling of this information by different apps.
- Yellow-tinted screens (primarily affecting white-cased units) – it turned out the previous models had a less accurately calibrated screen and thus, displayed images with a bluish tint.
- Battery problems – Apple released iOS 5.1.1 to diagnose and address the issue. However, the update has failed to completely resolve the underperforming battery issue. As of February 2012, Apple was still investigating the battery drain issue.
- Not understanding the accent of users from various countries while speaking to Siri.
- Bluetooth connectivity and range sometimes poor, deficient, and/or defective. The sound quality on the other end is muffled and/or undiscernible, with reports indicating the iPhone is likely the problem as opposed to the Bluetooth headsets.

The iPhone 4s had an issue where the Wi-Fi toggles would appear greyed out in both Settings and the Control Center, which was mainly caused by thermal shock of the Wi-Fi antenna.

=== Commercial reception ===
Unlike prior iPhone models, the number of sales of the iPhone 4 had not yet climaxed before the introduction of the 4s. Previous iPhone models were released during or after declining sales figures. In addition, iPhone 4 users had high marks for being satisfied with their smartphones. Upon the announcement of the iPhone 4s, shares of Samsung Electronics, HTC and Nokia gained on Wednesday after the 4s was announced, while Apple stock fell. However, later in the day, Apple shares rebounded ending with a 1% gain.

With the launch of orders, AT&T said that the demand for the iPhone 4s was "extraordinary". More than 200,000 orders were placed within 12 hours of release through AT&T. The German telephone company Deutsche Telekom said they were "satisfied" with consumer interest. In addition, AT&T, Verizon, and Sprint sold-out initial stock by October 8, 2011, and by October 9 there was a 1–2 week estimate on new orders to be filled. On October 20, 2011, AT&T surpassed one million iPhone 4s activations. On October 10, Apple announced that more than one million orders for the iPhone 4s had been received within the first 24 hours of it being on sale, beating the 600,000 device record set by the iPhone 4. The 16-month wait between the iPhone 4 and 4s may have contributed to overwhelming sales as well.

On October 17, 2011, Apple had announced that four million units of the iPhone 4s were sold in the first three days of release, and 25 million iOS users had upgraded to the then latest version of iOS, iOS 5, which was released upon the introduction of the iPhone 4s. Phil Schiller, Apple's senior vice president of Worldwide Product Marketing, stated that the "iPhone 4s is off to a great start with more than four million sold in its first weekend—the most ever for a phone and more than double the iPhone 4 launch during its first three days." The used smartphone market saw unprecedented rates of trade-ins in the weeks leading up to the 4s announcement, and after it, there was a drop in prices offered. Previous generation iPhones are recirculated through the markets via various methods and third-party buyers may purchase older generation iPhones. Apple also buys back previous generation iPhones under a special program. On April 24, 2012, AT&T announced that 7.6 million iPhone units were activated in Q4 2011, and 4.3 million in Q1 2012. In total, AT&T sold 5.5 million smartphones in the first quarter of 2012, out of which 78% were iPhones.

== See also ==
- List of iPhone models
- Timeline of iPhone models

== Notes ==
Preceded by iPhone 4	iPhone 4s 5th generation	Succeeded by iPhone 5
