= Undertow (video game) =

2007 video game

- Developer: Chair Entertainment
- Publisher: Chair Entertainment
- Engine: Unreal Engine 3
- Platform: Xbox 360
- Release: November 21, 2007
- Genre: Shooter
- Modes: Single-player, multiplayer

Undertow is a video game developed by Chair Entertainment for the Xbox 360's Xbox Live Arcade service.

== Gameplay ==
Undertow features a 15 level campaign for single-player or co-op and two multiplayer modes for up to 16 players. Players select their race (Iron Marine, Nemoidian, Atlantean, or Elect) and unit type and are then launched into battle. Each of the four races features four unique, upgradeable unit types ranging in ability from the fast and agile to the large and powerful. Players have the ability to unlock and purchase unit upgrades as they acquire points. Each unit type has three levels of permanent upgrades.

Through conquest-style battles, players obtain points by killing enemies, accomplishing team goals, and capturing check points. Points and a variety of power-ups can be used to further upgrade unit abilities.

== Plot ==
Undertow is set underwater, where an aquatic alien race known as the Elect launches an attack on the polar ice caps, causing them to melt and flood the planet. Most of the human race is decimated in the destruction. The remaining humans band together to reclaim the planet back from the alien race. The Iron Marines, an elite group of underwater divers, are sent to combat the alien threat. Elsewhere, Captain Nemo and his followers become enraged at the oceanic disturbances, and join the fight. With the city of Atlantis thawed by the melting of the ice caps the Atlanteans also become a threat, vowing to reclaim the planet and rule again.

== Marketing ==
On April 23, 2007, Chair Entertainment announced through a company press release that Undertow was in development for Xbox Live Arcade. The news was first reported in a "first look" preview on IGN.com and quickly became popular news item across all other major gaming news sites. In addition to the news, the company also released a 30-second teaser trailer, which revealed the first footage of the game in action. Chair began production on Undertow in the fall of 2006 and the game was released on November 21, 2007.

On January 18, 2008, Microsoft selected Undertow for its free game offer from January 23 through January 27 as compensation for the holiday traffic/outage experienced on Xbox Live. Given the game's strong focus on multiplayer, Chair welcomed the opportunity to participate in this promotion as the immediate influx of hundreds of new players greatly enhanced the competitive game play experience.

A single downloadable content pack was released for the game. Titled "Path of the Elect", the pack featured a new five-mission campaign following the story of the Elect, the aquatic alien race responsible for flooding the Earth, as well as new multiplayer maps.

== Reception ==
Reception

Aggregate scores
Aggregator	Score
GameRankings	78.97%
Metacritic	76%

Review score
Publication	Score
IGN	8.7/10

The game received numerous Editors Choice Awards from gaming publications and websites, including Official Xbox Magazine, IGN, and Team Xbox. IGN also selected Undertow as its Game of the Month for November 2007. Undertow was nominated for Microsoft's 2007 XBLA Awards and 1UP's 2007 Editors Choice Awards and was selected by Official Xbox Magazine as its 2007 Game of the Year for Xbox Live Arcade.

As of year-end 2010, Undertow has moved more than 634,000 units.
