= Antoni Bohdziewicz =

Polish screenplay writer and director

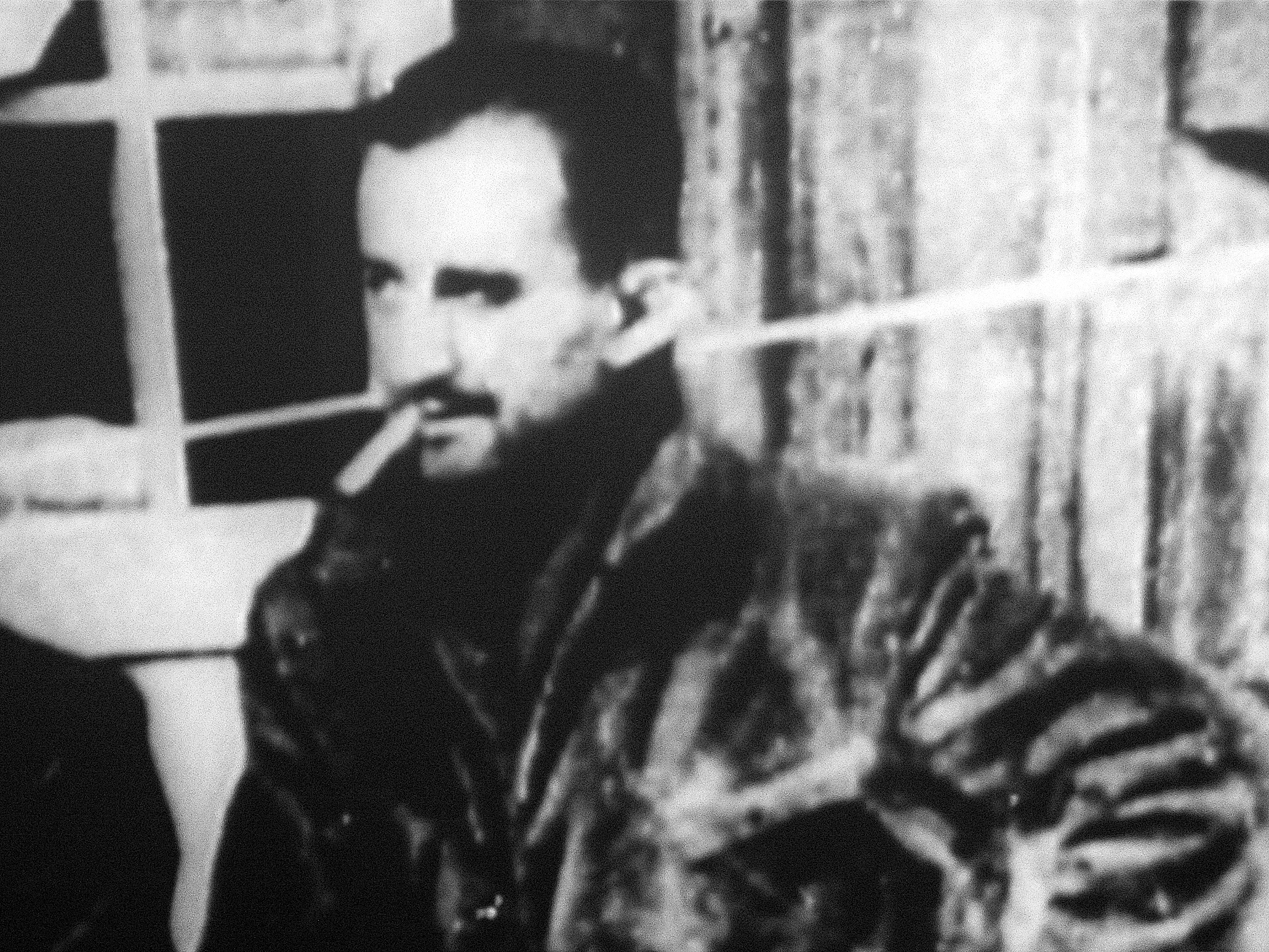
- Antoni Bohdziewicz during the Warsaw Uprising
- Born: 11 September 1906; Vilnius, Russian Empire
- Died: 20 October 1970 (aged 64); Warsaw, Poland, Europe
- Occupations: screenplay writer and director
- Years active: 1928-1970

Antoni Bohdziewicz (11 September 1906 – 20 October 1970) was a Polish screenplay writer and director, best known for his 1956 adaptation of Zemsta by Aleksander Fredro.

== Biography ==
Bohdziewicz was born in the city of Vilna (modern Vilnius), then part of the Russian Empire. In 1928, he graduated from the Technical Faculty of the Warsaw University of Technology and was simultaneously studying at the Faculty of Humanities of the Stefan Batory University. In 1928, he became a speaker at the newly established branch of the Polish Radio in his native city. In 1931 however he obtained a state scholarship and left for France. In Paris he joined the prestigious Ecole Technique de Photographie et de Cinématographie, where he also made his first documentaries.

In 1935, he returned to Poland and worked as a journalist and cameraman for the state-owned Polska Agencja Telegraficzna Film Chronicle (PAT), the most popular newsreel in Poland. He also worked as a journalist and columnist for the "Pion" weekly. In late 1930s he made numerous documentaries for the PAT agency, as well as for the SAF film studio. In 1939, he began working on his first feature film Zazdrość i medycyna, based on a novel by Michał Choromański. However, the shooting was interrupted by the outbreak of the Invasion of Poland (1939).

During World War II he was an active member of the Home Army and collaborated with the Bureau of Information and Propaganda as the head of the photo and film department. In 1943, he also started a Tres photographic studio in Warsaw, which became a clandestine outpost of the Home Army. During the Warsaw Uprising he became the head of the group of cameramen to prepare daily newsreels and was one of the people to prepare Warszawa walczy, a documentary filmed and shown entirely in besieged Warsaw.

After the war he continued his career in the same role and became one of the first members of the Polish Film Chronicle (PKF) company. Working in Kraków, already in March 1945 he started a Film Atelier for the Youth, the first film school to be opened in Poland after the end of the German occupation. In December of that year he converted his atelier into a regular study, which became a direct predecessor of the Kraków Film School. In 1948 he moved to Łódź, where he became the chairman of the Department of Direction of the National Film School. In that role he became a teacher of several generations of Polish film directors.

He also remained an active director himself. His first film, 2*2=4, was released already in 1945 and was among the first feature films to be shot in Poland after World War II. Between 1956 and 1962 Bohdziewicz served as an artistic director of the Droga Film Team and then the TOR Film Studio (1968–1970). Simultaneously he was also a teacher at the Brussels-based Institut National Supérieur des Arts du Spectacle.

He died on 20 October 1970 in Warsaw.
