= The Emperor (book) =

1978 book by Ryszard Kapuściński

The Emperor: Downfall of an Autocrat
- First edition (Polish)
- Author: Ryszard Kapuściński
- Original title: Cesarz
- Translator: William R. Brand and Katarzyna Mroczkowska-Brand
- Language: Polish
- Genre: Non-fiction/Literature
- Publisher: Czytelnik
- Publication date: 1978
- Publication place: Poland
- Media type: Print (Paperback)
- Pages: 164
- ISBN: 0-679-72203-3
- OCLC: 19822583

The Emperor: Downfall of an Autocrat, published in 1978, is Polish journalist Ryszard Kapuściński's analysis of the decline and fall of Haile Selassie's regime in Ethiopia. In 1974, while the Ethiopian Army was still busy consolidating power, Kapuściński "traveled to Ethiopia to seek out and interview Selassie's servants and closest associates on how the Emperor had ruled and why he fell." In large part, the book is a study of the workings of a royal court. According to some critics, the book serves as a political allegory for Edward Gierek's government in the Polish People's Republic during the late 1970s.

== Contents ==
=== The Throne ===
Section one focuses on the constitution of Emperor Haile Selassie's imperial court.

=== It's Coming, It's Coming ===
Section two focuses on the attempted coup led by Mengistu Neway on 13 December 1960, and its repercussions.

=== The Collapse ===
This section focuses on the Ethiopian Revolution and the ultimate downfall of Selassie, featuring an account by his valet, who was the last remaining servant in the Emperor's court. This is followed by two short newspaper articles on the Emperor's last few years of life, which show that he still believed himself to be the true leader of Ethiopia.

== Theatre ==
"The Emperor" had a world premiere in London's Young Vic on 3 September 2016. The play was well received by the reviewers.
