= Shah of Shahs (book) =

1982 book by Ryszard Kapuściński

- First edition cover (Polish)
- Author: Ryszard Kapuściński
- Original title: Szachinszach
- Translator: William R. Brand and Katarzyna Mroczkowska-Brand Translator( Valiallah Ebrahimi), translated the English version of Shah of Shahs in Persian
- Cover artist: Andrzej Heidrich
- Language: Polish
- Subject: Mohammad Reza Pahlavi
- Publisher: Czytelnik
- Publication date: 1982
- Publication place: Poland
- Media type: Print (hardcover)
- Pages: 179
- ISBN: 83-07-00704-6

Shah of Shahs (Polish: Szachinszach) is a 1982 non-fiction book by Polish journalist Ryszard Kapuściński. It is his analysis of the decline and fall of Mohammad Reza Pahlavi, the last Shah of Iran.
