= Katarzyna Mroczkowska-Brand =

Polish literary scholar and translator

- Occupation: Literary scholar

Katarzyna Mroczkowska-Brand is a comparative literature scholar and translator.

== Biography ==
She was born as the daughter of Przemysław Mroczkowski. She obtained master’s degree in romance philology from the Jagiellonian University in 1973. She completed doctoral studies at the University of Rochester with PhD in comparative literature in 1985. She obtained habilitation in 2011. Together with William R. Brand she translated into English Another Day of Life, The Emperor and Shah of Shahs by Ryszard Kapuściński. Her daughter Maja Brand was a humanitarian activist who died in the Szczekociny rail crash in 2012. In 2017, with William R. Brand, Katarzyna Mroczkowska-Brand received Award for Ryszard Kapuściński’s Translators for Lifetime Achievement in Translation.

== Books ==
- The Theatrum Mundi Metaphor in Spanish and English Drama 1570–1640. Kraków. 1993.
- Przeczucia innego porządku. Mapa realizmu magicznego w literaturze światowej XX i XXI wieku. Kraków: Wydawnictwo Uniwersytetu Jagiellońskiego. 2009.
- Deportowani z życia. Nowe głosy w narracjach literackich i ich kolonialne konteksty. Kraków: Wydawnictwo Uniwersytetu Jagiellońskiego. 2017. Reviews.
