= The Shadow of the Sun =

1998 book by Ryszard Kapuściński

- First edition (Polish)
- Author: Ryszard Kapuściński
- Original title: Heban
- Translator: Klara Glowczewska
- Publisher: Czytelnik
- Publication date: 1998

The Shadow of the Sun (Polish: Heban, literally "Ebony") is a collection of journalistic accounts and essays by Polish writer and journalist Ryszard Kapuściński. It was published in 1998 and by Penguin Books in 2001 with the English translation by Klara Glowczewska.

== Description ==
Kapuściński spent nearly 30 years, on and off from the late 1950s to the mid 1990s, in various African countries such as Ghana, Kenya, Rwanda, Nigeria, Ethiopia, Tanzania and Liberia, reporting his accounts of different developments in those states.

Kapuściński's experience in Africa was unique, because he had the opportunity to stay with people of various classes in society, staying with ministers, as well as peasants in rural villages which gave him an honest perspective on what was the current situation of the continent.

The early pages of The Shadow of the Sun, a compendium of further adventures in Africa, find Ryszard Kapuściński in Dar es Salaam in 1962, where he hears that Uganda is about to gain independence. He and a friend, Leo, promptly set off for Kampala via the Serengeti, with its teeming wildlife. "It's all improbable, incredible. As if one were witnessing the birth of the world, that precise moment when the earth and sky already exist, as do water, plants, and wild animals, but not yet Adam and Eve." They have no maps, they're lost, and they're confronted with an enormous herd – "stretching almost to the horizon" – of buffalo. They press on regardless.

Penguin Classics published a 100-page extract of "The Shadow of the Sun," in English in February 2007, as part of their "Great Journeys," series of short books highlighting 20 diverse historic examples of travel writing from antiquity to 2007. "The Shadow of the Sun" extract was published under the title "The Cobra's Heart," (ISBN 9780141025551).
