= Imperium (Kapuściński book) =

1993 book by Ryszard Kapuściński

- First edition (Polish)
- Author: Ryszard Kapuściński
- Translator: Klara Glowczewska
- Language: Polish
- Genre: Non-fiction/Literature
- Publisher: Czytelnik
- Publication date: 1993
- Publication place: Poland
- Media type: Print (Paperback)
- Pages: 364
- ISBN: 978-83-070-3457-7

Imperium (English: "Empire"), published in 1993, is a book by Polish journalist Ryszard Kapuściński about his travels to the Soviet Union, and more broadly about his personal relationship with that country. Its English translation (by Klara Glowczewska) was first published in 1994. The book is both a personal travelogue and a memoir, divided into three parts.

== Synopsis ==
In the first part, entitled First Encounters (1939-1967), Kapuściński writes about the 1939 entry of the Red Army into Pińsk, his home town in the Polesie area, and about the poverty and terror he experienced during the ensuing Soviet rule. He continues to describe his postwar experiences in the Soviet Union, including his travel on the Trans-Siberian Railway, and his travels to Central Asian and Transcaucasian republics of the Soviet Union, today Georgia, Armenia, Azerbaijan, Turkmenistan, Tajikistan, Kyrgyzstan and Uzbekistan.

The second part of the book, From a Bird's-eye View (1989-1991), makes up over one half of the book, and is a travelogue from his lone trips around the Soviet Union during its collapse. In the European part of the USSR Kapuściński visited, among others, Brest, Moscow and Donetsk, in the Far North - Magadan and Vorkuta, in the South - Tbilisi and Yerevan. During these voyages he traveled over 60,000 km, mostly by plane.

The last, shortest part, The Sequel Continues (1992-1993), is a summary. It is also an attempt to analyze the changes in the countries that arose from the disintegration of the USSR. According to the author himself, the whole work does not end with a higher and final synthesis, but with the reverse, because during its writing the subject and theme of the book, the great Soviet Empire, has disappeared.

== See also ==
- Polish literature
- List of Polish writers
