= Another Day of Life =

1976 book by Ryszard Kapuściński

- First edition (Polish)
- Author: Ryszard Kapuściński
- Original title: Jeszcze dzień życia
- Translator: William R. Brand and Katarzyna Mroczkowska-Brand
- Language: Polish
- Genre: Non-fiction/Literature
- Publisher: Czytelnik
- Publication date: 1976
- Publication place: Poland
- Media type: Print (Paperback)
- Pages: 144
- ISBN: 0-375-72629-2
- OCLC: 44926881
- Dewey Decimal: 967.3/03 21
- LC Class: DT611.76.K37 A3 2001

Another Day of Life (Polish: Jeszcze dzień życia) is a non-fiction record of three months of the Angolan Civil War by the Polish writer Ryszard Kapuściński.

== Summary ==
It is made up of a notable description of the degradation of the Angolan capital, Luanda, an analysis of the various weaknesses of the Popular Movement for the Liberation of Angola (MPLA) front, correspondence through Telex between Kapuściński and the Polish Press Agency and a brief history of the conflict in Angola until from 1975 to 1976.

== History ==
The book was turned into a full-length animated documentary by the same name. Filming of the documentary part of the film started in the Autumn of 2013 in Poland, Angola, Portugal and Cuba. Released in 2018 and directed by Raul de la Fuente and Damian Nenow, Another Day of Life is a Polish, Spanish, German, Belgian and Hungarian co-production. The film premiered at the Cannes Film Festival of 2018.
