= Polish Press Agency =

Company

Polska Agencja Prasowa

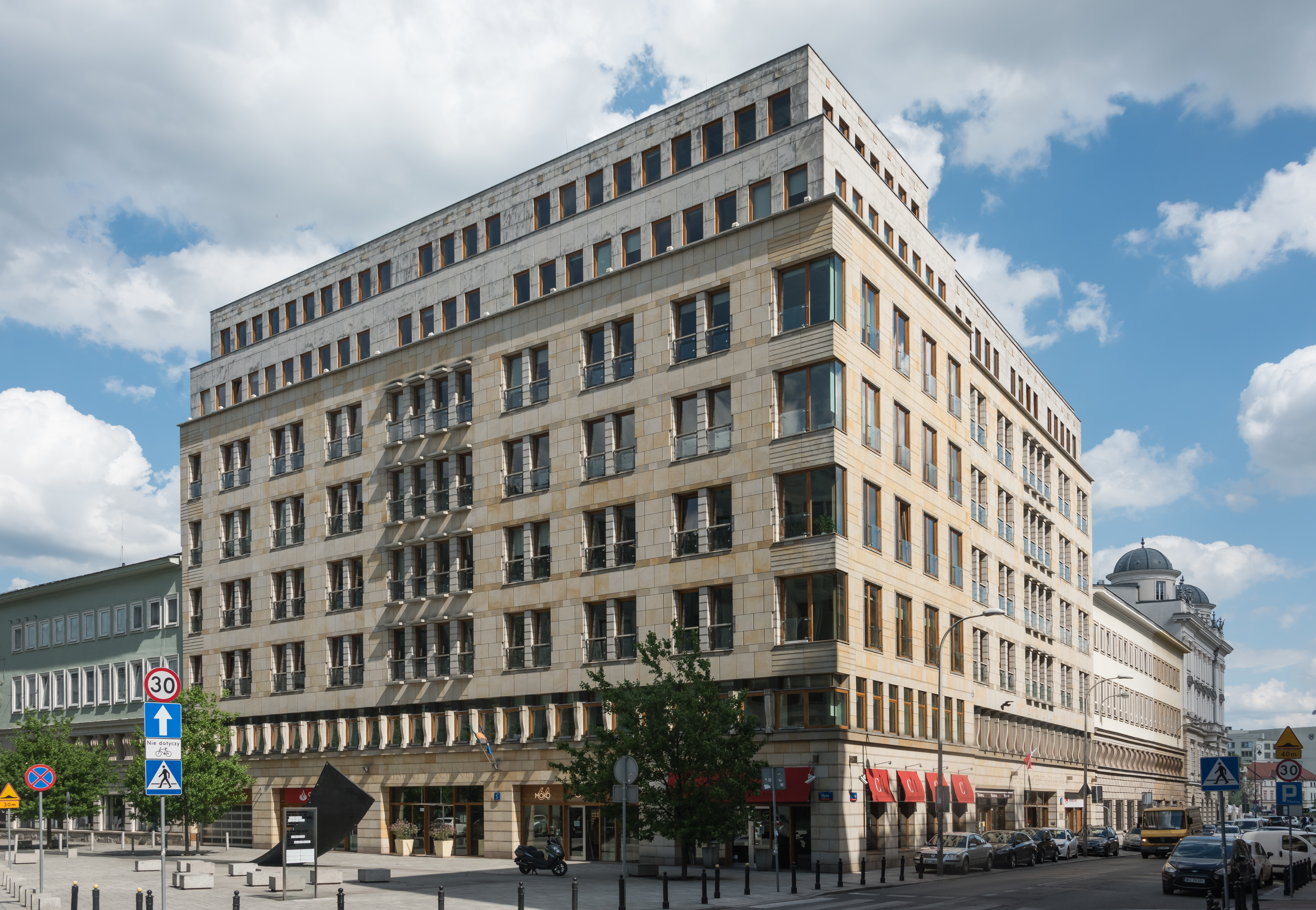
- Company type: Not-for-profit news agency
- Industry: News media
- Founded: Warsaw (31 October 1918), 107 years ago
- Headquarters: ul. Bracka 6/8, Warsaw, 00-502 Poland
- Key people: Marek Błoński (CEO)
- Products: News service
- Owner: Polska Agencja Prasowa S.A.
- Number of employees: circa 500
- Website: pap.pl

The Polish Press Agency (Polish: Polska Agencja Prasowa, PAP) is Poland's national news agency, producing and distributing political, economic, social, and cultural news as well as events information. It was founded in 1918 as Polish Telegraphic Agency (PAT).

PAP serves print media, online, radio and TV, as well as government offices and private businesses. It has 14 news desks in its headquarters in Warsaw and 24 regional bureaux.

As of 2013, the agency had nearly 500 employees and associates, including 300 journalists in Warsaw, 70 regional correspondents, 50 photojournalists and 30 foreign correspondents (among others in Berlin, Brussels, Kyiv, London, Madrid, Moscow, New York, Paris, Rome, Sofia, Stockholm, Washington and Vilnius).

In 2019 PAP announced plans to extend its foreign correspondent network to additional countries in Europe, Caucasus, Latin America and Southeast Asia in order to expand its presence in Central European and global markets.

According to the company's website, its content reaches 96.5% of Polish Internet users via online media. In 2022, it had a turnover of 56.6 million PLN.

Polish Press Agency is an active member of the European Alliance of News Agencies (EANA).

== History ==
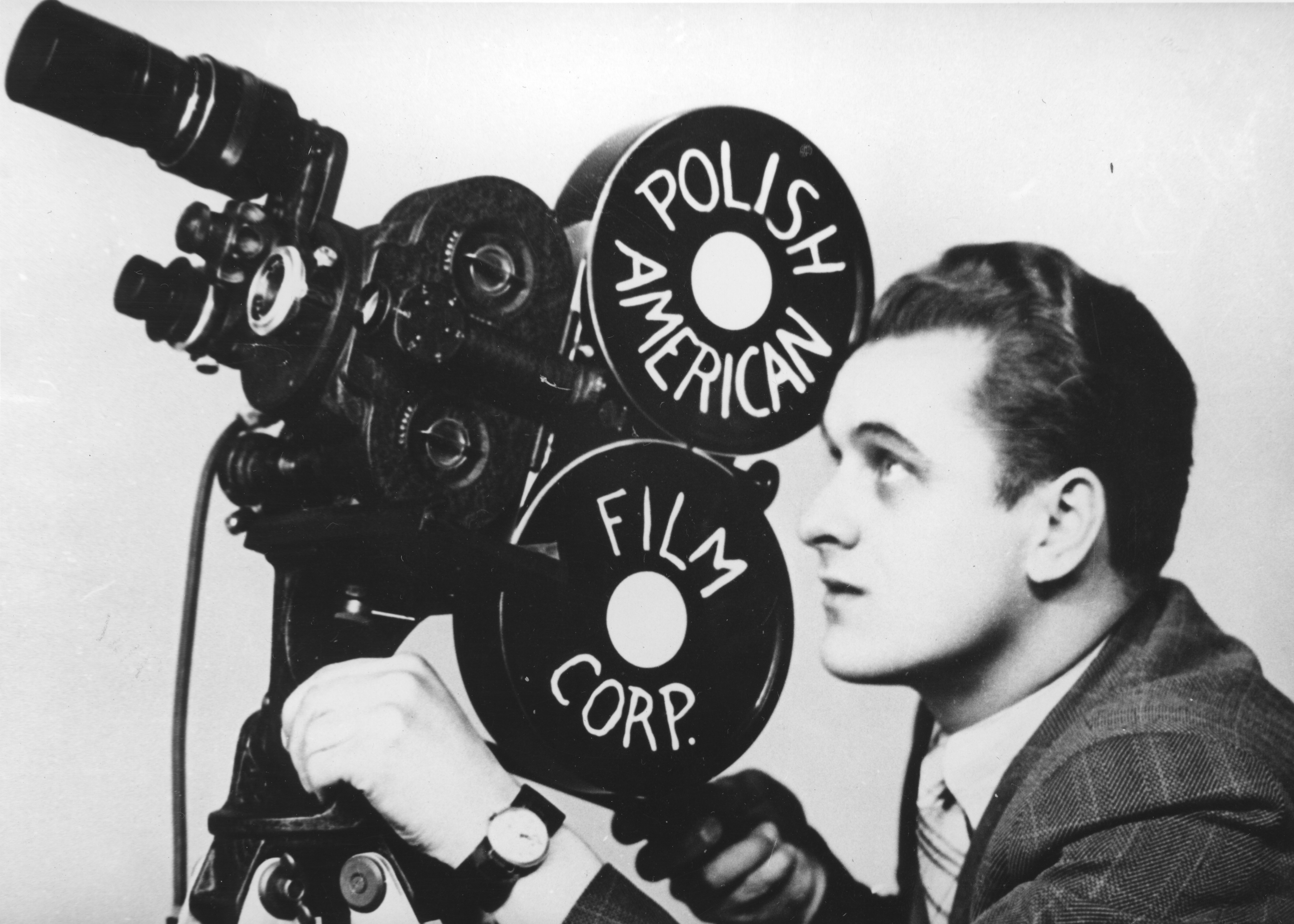
Kazimierz Karasiewicz, war correspondent at Polish Telegraphic Agency (PAT), 1940s.

Polska Agencja Prasowa S.A. was incorporated in 1918 as the Polish Telegraphic Agency (Polska Agencja Telegraficzna, PAT) which makes it one of the world's oldest wire services. PAT ran 14 news bulletins in several languages. In 1925, it launched a regular newsreel and offered a photo service since the 1930s.

In 1944, following the Soviet entry into German-occupied Poland during World War II, the company was taken over by the Polish communists and set up under its current name as the local alternative to the still functioning Polish Telegraphic Agency loyal to the Polish government in exile from 1939 in Paris and London. Under the Polish People's Republic, PAP was a government institution and the official communist mouthpiece. In 1990, after the fall of communism in Poland, the company was reformed and in 1991 the original PTA was finally merged into PAP to form the present-day Agency.

PAP has gradually expanded the number of its news desks, journalists and correspondents. In 1993, the agency launched satellite transmission of its services and started online news distribution in 1995. In 2001, it joined the European Pressphoto Agency (EPA). In the early 2000s, on top of its regular international coverage, PAP had field reporters covering the war in Iraq.

Since 2019, PAP owns Detektyw (The Detective) - a popular monthly magazine on crime that the agency has taken over along with the state owned PWR publishing company.

PAP was one of the public media companies affected by the 19 to 20 December 2023 takeover of Polish public media by the recently elected October 15 Coalition. On 27 December 2023, Minister of Culture and National Heritage Bartłomiej Sienkiewicz placed PAP and other public media bodies into liquidation after Polish president Andrzej Duda vetoed a bill containing funding for public media bodies; the liquidation was not intended to impact PAP's day-to-day running. The decision to put PAP into liquidation was entered into the National Court Register on 29 January 2024.

== Services ==
=== Polish language services ===
The Daily News Service is updated on seven-days-a-week basis, 24 hours a day, and offers around 1000 articles everyday, mainly on politics, business, economy, foreign affairs, sports, science and education.

The business service is prepared by a team of 35 financial editors and several dozen reporters, supported by numerous domestic and foreign correspondents. It covers more than 1000 capital market entities and provides over 100 news items a day.

=== Multimedia ===
PAP-Photo produces and distributes the Daily Photographic Service that offers around 200-300 photos from across Poland and about 1000 images from around the world thanks to the cooperation with the European Pressphoto Agency (EPA), with a large archive of photographs available.

It also provides video content and infographics service in the form of charts, tables, diagrams, maps, 3D animations and interactive graphics.

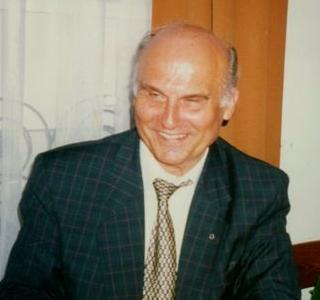
Ryszard Kapuściński was PAP's foreign correspondent from 1957 to 1972.

=== Other language services ===
The Daily News Service is also available in English and Russian. The English service brings major political, economic, social and cultural coverage from Poland and is compiled from PAP regular news service by a team of editors and translators.

In 2022, PAP launched a Ukrainian-language service in response to the Russian invasion of Ukraine and the resulting influx of refugees.

=== The First News ===
In May 2018, PAP launched an English-language news website called The First News that focused mainly on events in Poland, claiming that international media did not always portray the country "entirely accurately" and with the goal of reaching "specific opinion-forming circles" with the help of social media." On 29 January 2024, following PAP being put into liquidation over a month earlier, it was announced that The First News would be shut down on 15 February and its content would not be updated in the interim; PAP's acting editor-in-chief Marek Błoński said that financial analysis "confirmed the unprofitability of this project, and the substantive analysis led to the conclusion that running such a portal is not directly part of the tasks falling within the public mission of PAP", and that the website had not met its primary goals since it did not have "any measurable impact on Poland's good image among recipients".

=== Dzieje.pl ===
In cooperation with the Museum of Polish History, PAP has been running an educational portal Dzieje.pl, updated daily. It has published tens of thousands of articles on history and over 11 thousand photographs.

== Notable journalists ==
For many years the celebrated travel writer Ryszard Kapuściński worked as a field reporter for PAP; his posting as the agency's first Africa correspondent provided the material and inspiration for many of his later writings.

Many other prominent Polish journalists and intellectuals worked for PAP at some point of their careers. That includes Wojciech Jagielski who has won acclaim for his reportage from conflict zones in the Transcaucasus, the Caucasus, Central Asia and Africa, renowned lexicographer and publisher Władysław Kopaliński, author, war correspondent and Poland's ambassador to India Krzysztof Mroziewicz, travel writer and sailor Leonid Teliga as well as journalist, columnist and essayist Leopold Unger who reported for the agency from Havana during the Cuban Missile Crisis of 1962.

== In popular culture ==
PAP was mentioned in a 2018 animated film Another Day of Life by Raúl de la Fuente and Damian Nenow. The film is based on Kapuściński's autobiographical account, Another Day of Life.

== See also ==
- Polish Telegraphic Agency
