= Football War =

1969 war between El Salvador and Honduras

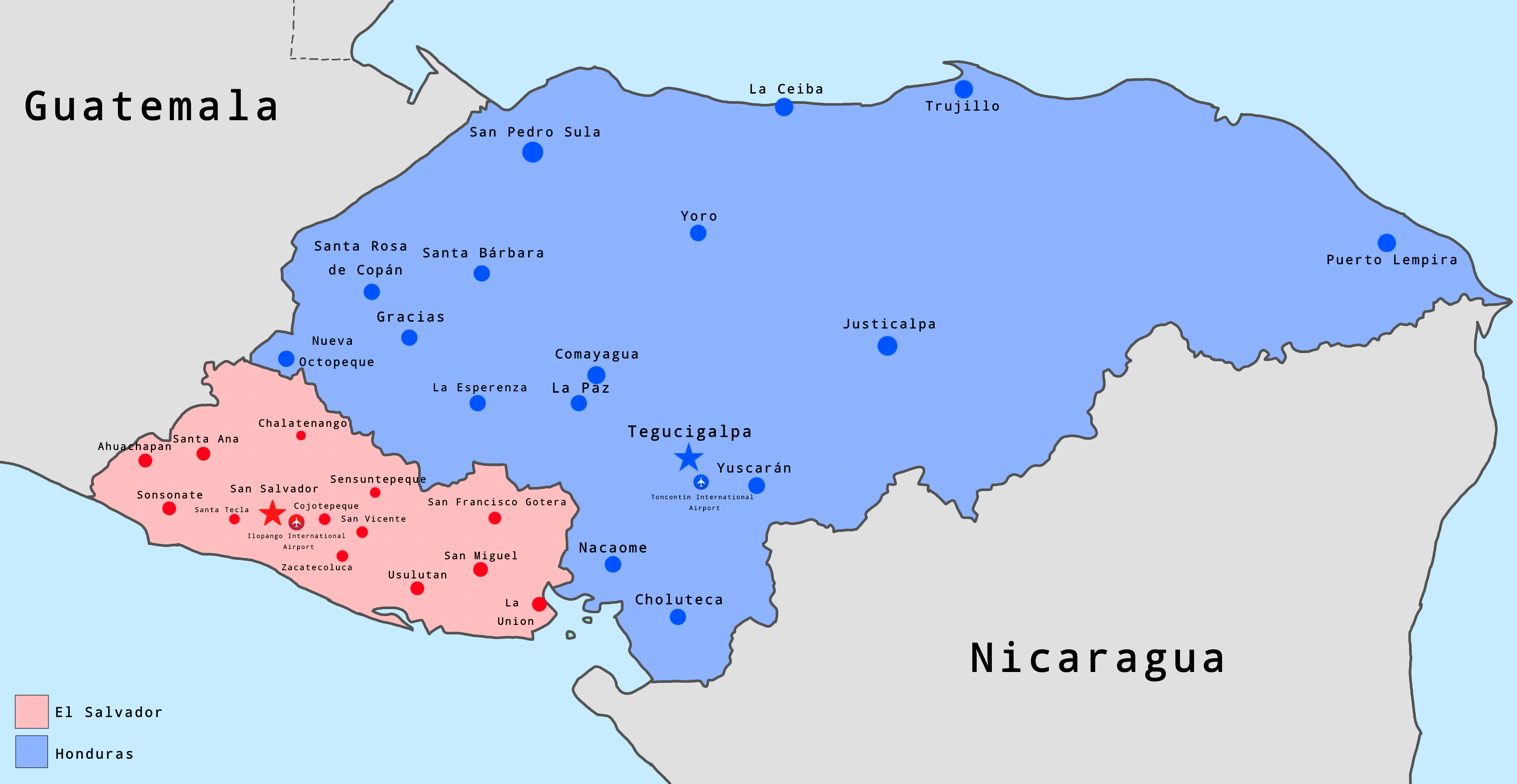
- Map illustrating the territories seized by El Salvador at the height of the conflict, prior to their eventual withdrawal.
Date	14–18 July 1969 (4 days)
Location	El Salvador and Honduras
Result	Ceasefire by OAS intervention
Territorial changes	None, Status quo ante bellum

Belligerents
El Salvador	Honduras

Commanders and leaders
Fidel Sánchez Hernández	Oswaldo López Arellano

Strength
8,000 (ground forces); 11 combat aircraft	2,500 (ground forces); 23 combat aircraft

Casualties and losses
Per El Salvador: 107 killed; 593 injured; 3 aircraft destroyed	Per Honduras: 99 killed; 66 injured; Per Parish priest: 400 killed; Per CIA: 1,500 killed
- +2,000 civilians killed

The Football War (Spanish: La Guerra del Fútbol) was a brief military conflict fought between El Salvador and Honduras in 1969. Existing tensions between the two countries coincided with rioting during a 1970 FIFA World Cup qualifier, hence its nickname. The war began on 14 July 1969 when the Salvadoran military launched an attack against Honduras. The Organization of American States (OAS) negotiated a cease-fire on the night of 18 July. Salvadoran troops were withdrawn in early August.

The war, while brief, had major consequences for both countries and was a major factor in starting the Salvadoran Civil War a decade later.

== Names ==
The term Football War was coined by economist Vincent Cable in a 1969 journal article for International Affairs, but popularized by Polish journalist and author Ryszard Kapuściński in his 1978 book Wojna futbolowa, translated into English in 1990 as The Soccer War.

In Latin America, it is more commonly referred to as the 100 Hours War (Spanish: La Guerra de las Cien Horas) or simply as the Honduras–El Salvador conflict (Spanish: Conflicto Honduras–El Salvador).

== Background ==
Although the nickname "Football War" implies that the conflict was due to a football match, the causes of the war went much deeper. The roots were issues over land reform in Honduras and immigration and demographic problems in El Salvador. El Salvador was overpopulated and there were not enough jobs to go around. The majority of the population was forced to endure low wages and dangerous working conditions which encouraged many to leave the country. Many Salvadorans migrated to Honduras to work on banana plantations out of desperation. El Salvador's land distribution was also highly disproportionate with 5% of farms occupying 70% of the overall land. This left roughly 80% of landholdings under 3 acres and an estimated 200,000 peasants landless. Honduras has more than five times the area of neighboring El Salvador, but in 1969 the population of El Salvador (3.5 million) was 34.6% larger than that of Honduras (2.6 million). At the beginning of the 20th century, Salvadorans had begun migrating to Honduras in large numbers. By 1969, more than 300,000 Salvadorans were living in Honduras, making up more than 10% of Honduras's population.

In Honduras, as in much of Central America, a large majority of the land was owned by big corporations or large landowners. The United Fruit Company owned 10% of the land, making it hard for the average landowner to compete. Just 8.8% of landowners held over 63% of the land, and the top 1% held over 38%. In 1966, these landowners united to create the National Federation of Honduran Farmers and Ranchers (Spanish: Federación Nacional de Agricultores y Ganaderos de Honduras, FENAGH). This group put pressure on the President of Honduras, General Oswaldo López Arellano, to protect the property of wealthy landowners from campesinos, many of whom were Salvadoran.

In 1962, Honduras successfully enacted a new land reform law. Fully enforced by 1967, this law gave the central government and municipalities much of the land occupied illegally by Salvadoran immigrants and redistributed it to native-born Hondurans. The land was taken from both immigrant farmers and squatters regardless of their claims to ownership or immigration status. This created problems for Salvadorans and Hondurans who were married. Thousands of Salvadoran laborers were expelled from Honduras, including both migrant workers and longer-term settlers. Then later in 1969 the Honduran president decided against the renewal of the 1967 Bilateral Treaty on Immigration, causing the deportation of even more Salvadorans. This general rise in tensions ultimately led to a military conflict.

== Buildup ==
=== World Cup qualifiers ===
In June 1969, both countries faced off in a two-leg 1970 FIFA World Cup qualifier. The first game was held in Tegucigalpa, Honduras' capital, on 8 June 1969. Honduran fans harassed the Salvadoran team the night before the match by blaring car horns, setting off firecrackers, and throwing rocks at their hotel windows. Honduras won 1–0; in response, Salvadoran fans reportedly set fire to part of the stadium.

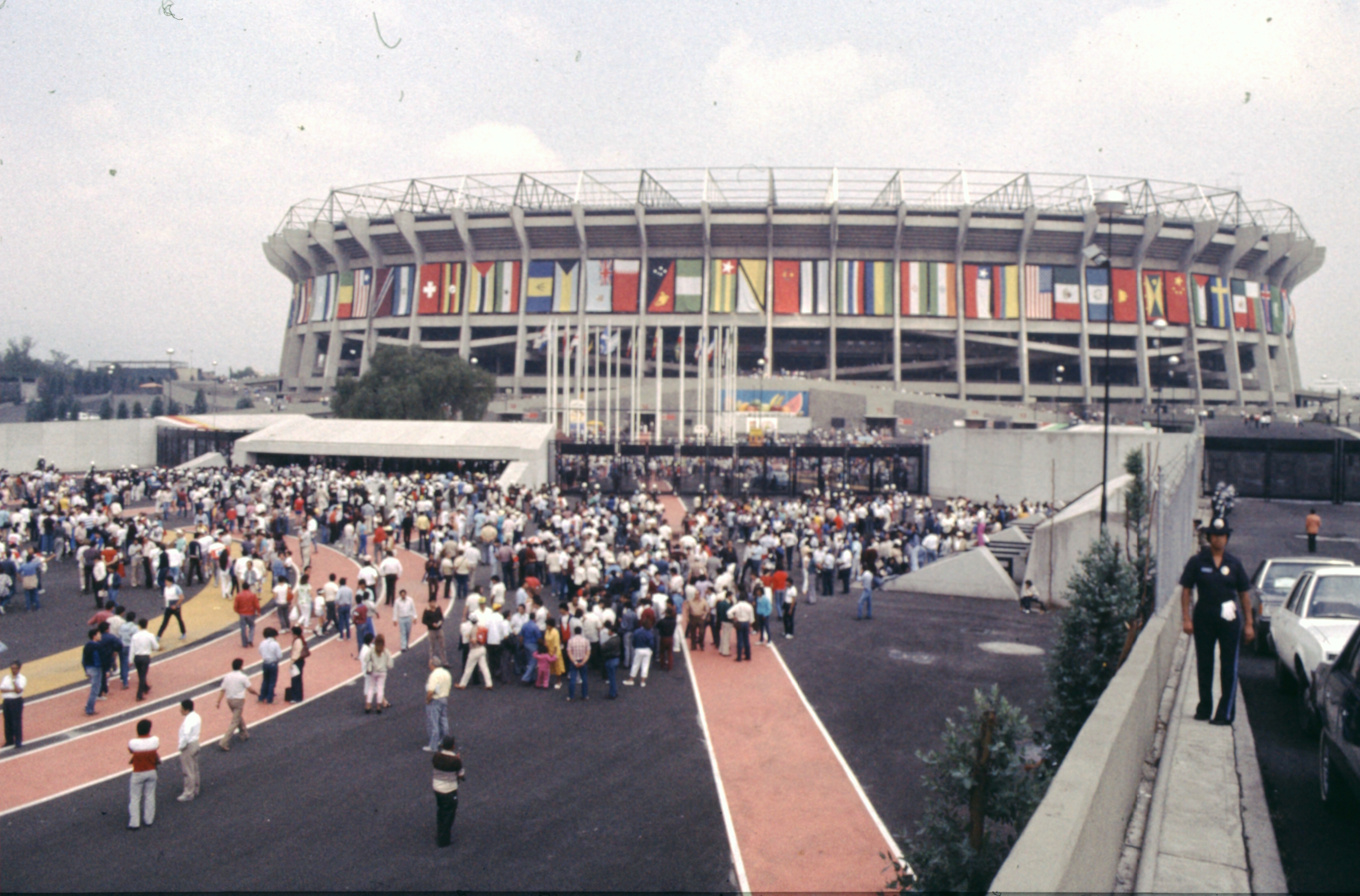
The Estadio Azteca, where the tiebreaker took place on 27 June; El Salvador won 3–2.

The second game was held in San Salvador, El Salvador's capital, on 15 June 1969. Salvadoran fans, seeking vengeance, rioted outside the Honduran team's hotel, leading to several deaths. At the start of the match, a dirty rag was flown instead of the Honduran flag. It was won 3–0 by El Salvador. Anti-Salvadoran riots occurred across Honduras following the loss.

On 26 June 1969, the night before the play-off match in Mexico City, which El Salvador would win 3–2 after extra time, El Salvador dissolved all diplomatic ties with Honduras, stating that around 12,000 Salvadorans had been forced to flee Honduras in the days following the second match. It further claimed that "the Government of Honduras has not taken any effective measures to punish these crimes which constitute genocide, nor has it given assurances of indemnification or reparations for the damages caused to Salvadorans".

=== Border skirmishes ===
On 3 July, Salvadoran anti-aircraft guns fired on a civilian Douglas DC-3 in Honduran airspace, causing the Honduran Air Force (Spanish: Fuerza Aérea Hondureña, FAH) to scramble two North American T-28 Trojans and forces stationed near the border town of El Poy to briefly clash. The same day, a Piper PA-28 Cherokee, used by the Salvadoran Air Force (Spanish: Fuerza Aérea Salvadoreña, FAS) as a reconnaissance plane, was intercepted, but managed to escape capture.

At the request of the Honduran foreign minister, the OAS held an emergency meeting the following day, where it was decided that the organization would "postpone any action of its own" and have the neighboring nations of Nicaragua, Costa Rica, and Guatemala mediate the situation. Honduras and El Salvador were also both urged to "avoid any action that might further endanger the situation". However, the OAS resolution did little to reduce tensions as skirmishes continued.

On 5 July, El Salvador claimed that two Honduran platoons had crossed the border.

On 12 July, Honduras claimed that four Salvadoran soldiers had been killed in an incursion, something which El Salvador dismissed as part of a "continuing campaign of distortion of the truth".

On 13 July, six Honduran civilians were injured during another skirmish at El Poy, in which the two sides exchanged mortar fire.

== War ==
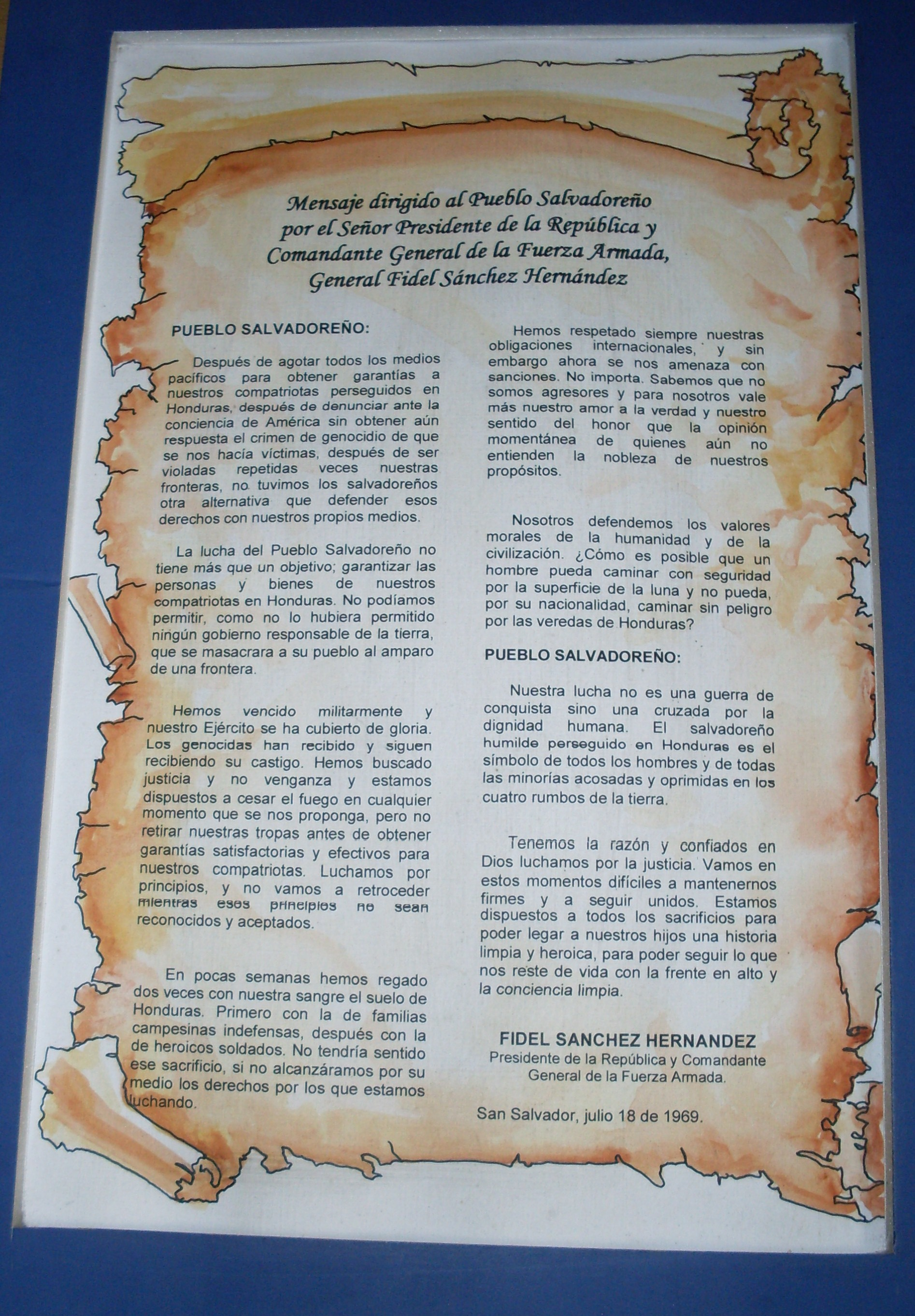
A declaration made by Salvadoran President Fidel Sánchez Hernández regarding the war.

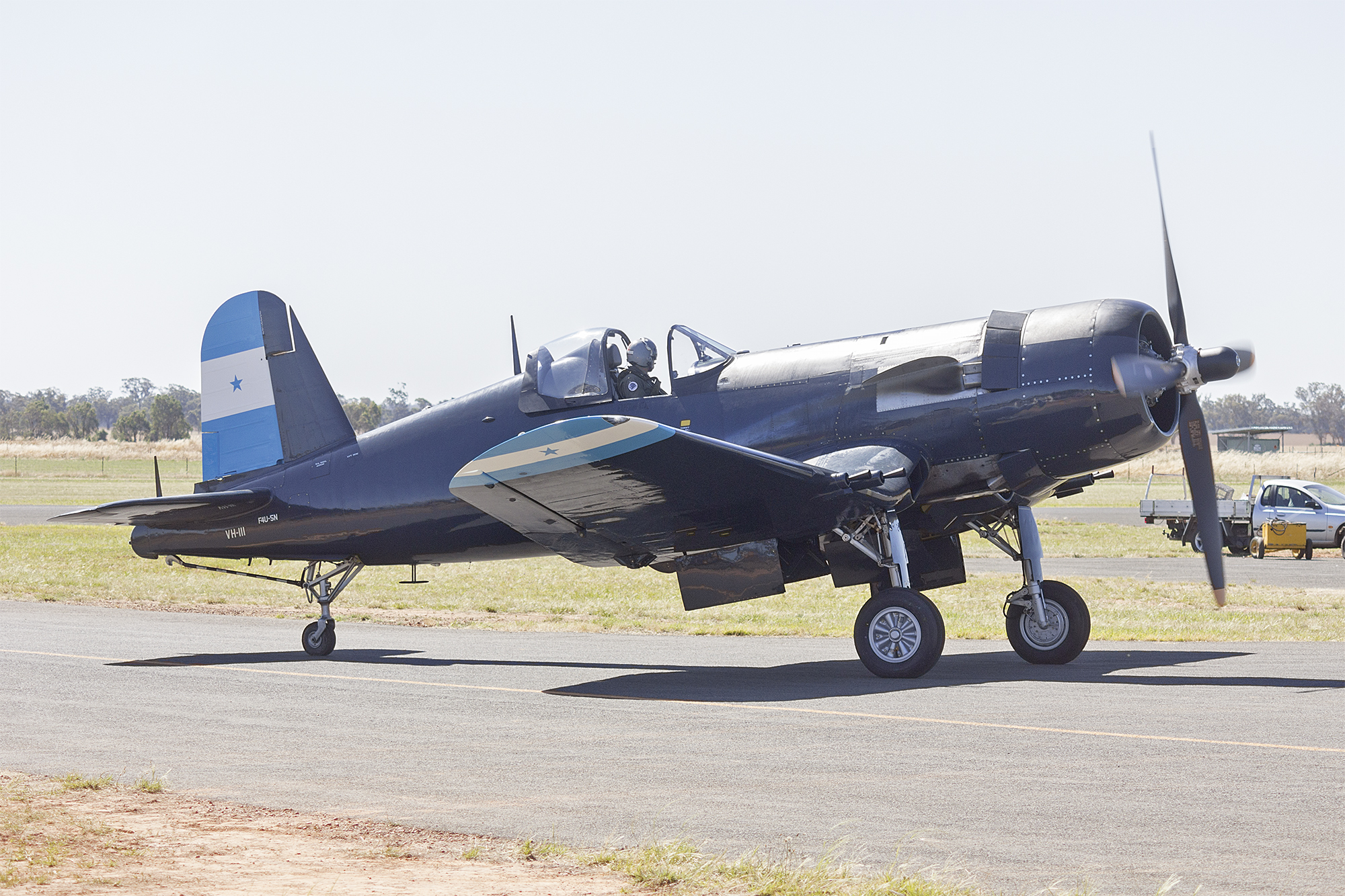
A Vought F4U Corsair of the Honduran Air Force, a type of aircraft used during the war.

The war began on 14 July 1969 at around 6 PM, when the FAS attacked Honduran airfields using P-51 Mustangs, as well as C-47 Skytrains and civilian aircraft hastily converted into bombers. They mainly targeted Toncontín International Airport, where the FAH kept half of its aircraft. The Salvadoran Army then launched a two-front invasion of Honduras; one contingent headed to secure the prosperous Sula Valley, while the other marched along the Pan-American Highway toward Tegucigalpa. Troops were supported by M3A1 Stuarts, as well as bulldozers and trucks using improvised vehicle armor. Initial progress was swift, with La Prensa Gráfica claiming they advanced 40 kilometres (25 mi) in a single day.

On 15 July, the FAH commenced bombings using their own fleet of World War II-era aircraft, mainly consisting of F4U Corsairs. Sortie targets included the Ilopango International Airport and oil facilities in Acajutla and Port Cutuco. El Salvador lost 20% of its fuel reserves in the raids. However, despite the operation's success, the FAH went on the defensive for the rest of the war following a second FAS attack on Toncontín.

On 16 July, in the only major battle of the war, Salvadoran troops led by Colonel Mario ("El Diablo") Velázquez Jandres, reached and surrounded Nueva Ocotepeque, pressing defenses in what Time Magazine described as a "narrow defile". Following artillery barrages, Honduran forces retreated alongside civilians, leading to the town's capture. Both fronts stalled later that day due to an ammunition shortage and increasing Honduran resistance.

One of the last engagements of the war took place on the afternoon of 17 July, a dogfight which involved 4 Corsairs and 2 Mustangs. Captain Guillermo Reynaldo Cortez, a Salvadoran, was killed; he was the highest-ranking casualty of the war. The Football War was the last conflict in which piston-engined fighters fought each other.

== Ceasefire ==
Soon after the start of the war, the OAS held a special session, organizing a seven nation committee to oversee negotiations and calling for a cease-fire. While Honduran officials were reportedly willing, El Salvador resisted OAS pressure for several days, with one of the biggest sticking points, according to the CIA, being the time window given for troops to be withdrawn.

A cease-fire was arranged on the night of 18 July, which required Salvadoran troops to withdraw within 96 hours and an end to "inflammatory press, radio, and T.V. campaigns", among other things. It took effect at midnight.

=== Delayed withdrawal ===
Soon before the initial 96 hour deadline, the Salvadoran government sent a document to the OAS, stating, while it would continue to hold the cease-fire, it would not withdraw troops until a guarantee of safety for Salvadorans still living in Honduras was given, reparations were paid, and anti-Salvadoran rioters were punished. Honduras only fulfilled the first demand, but El Salvador relented after the OAS threatened sanctions, resulting in troops withdrawing on 2 August 1969.

== Consequences ==
El Salvador suffered up to 700 casualties throughout the course of the war, including 107 deaths. Three aircraft were also destroyed in Honduran air raids. Official records state Honduras suffered 165 casualties, including 99 deaths, but such numbers have been disputed; Nueva Ocotepeque's parish priest reportedly saw 400 dead, while internal CIA documents report up to 1,500. Most historians agree that civilians accounted for the majority of the losses.

Estimates place the number of Salvadorans displaced between 60,000 and 130,000. Many of them had been forcibly exiled or had fled from war-torn Honduras, only to enter an El Salvador in which the government was not welcoming. Most of these refugees were forced to provide for themselves with very little assistance. Over the next few years, more Salvadorans returned to their native land, where they encountered overpopulation and extreme poverty. The resulting social unrest was one of the causes of the Salvadoran Civil War, which followed approximately a decade later in which 70,000 to 80,000 died and a further 8,000 more disappeared.

Trade between Honduras and El Salvador, which had been heavily disrupted pre-war, was outright stopped following it. Honduras would go on to leave and thereby further weaken the already ailing Central American Common Market, a regional integration project that had been set up by the United States largely as a means of counteracting the effects of the Cuban Revolution.

== Aftermath ==
After initiating the war, El Salvador was eliminated in the first round of the World Cup, losing their first three matches against the Soviet, Mexican, and Belgian teams.

Much of the war was overshadowed internationally by other events at the time. The launch of the Apollo 11 mission, two days into the war on 16 July, took center stage in the news, and there were still Salvadoran troops in Honduras at the time of the moon landing on 20 July.

Eleven years after the conflict the two nations signed a peace treaty in Lima, Peru on 30 October 1980 and agreed to resolve the border dispute over the Gulf of Fonseca and five sections of land boundary through the International Court of Justice (ICJ). In 1992, the Court awarded most of the disputed territory to Honduras. Despite the ICJ's ruling, El Salvador did not accept their decision until 1999. The total disputed land area given to Honduras after the court's ruling was around 374.5 km^{2} (145 sq mi). In the Gulf of Fonseca the court found that Honduras held sovereignty over the island of El Tigre, and El Salvador over the islands of Meanguera and Meanguerita.

The dispute continued despite the ICJ ruling. At a meeting in March 2012 President Porfirio Lobo of Honduras, President Otto Pérez of Guatemala, and President Daniel Ortega of Nicaragua all agreed that the Gulf of Fonseca would be designated as a peace zone. El Salvador was not at the meeting. However, in December 2012, El Salvador agreed to a tripartite commission of government representatives from El Salvador, Honduras, and Nicaragua that was to take care of territorial disputes through peaceful means and come up with a solution by 1 March 2013. The commission did not meet after December, and in March 2013 stiff letters threatening military action were exchanged between Honduras and El Salvador.

Although the relationship between the countries of El Salvador and Honduras remained rocky for over four decades after the war's end, the players themselves still considered each other friends, regardless of their country of origin. This was to the point that the veterans of the 1969 teams played charity matches, after the 2001 earthquakes in El Salvador, to raise money for the earthquake's victims.

== See also ==
- El Salvador–Honduras relations
