= The Soccer War (book) =

1978 book by Ryszard Kapuściński

- First edition (Polish)
- Author: Ryszard Kapuściński
- Original title: Wojna futbolowa
- Translator: William Brand
- Language: Polish
- Genre: Reportage, Travel writing
- Publisher: Czytelnik
- Publication date: 1978
- Publication place: Poland
- Media type: Print
- Pages: 240
- ISBN: 978-0679738053

The Soccer War is a 1978 book by Ryszard Kapuściński, the Polish press correspondent in Africa and Latin America in the 1960s. The eponymous Soccer War erupts between the Central American Republics of Honduras and El Salvador, partially as a result of a football match between teams of the two countries. The deeper reasons for the conflict were political.

The book features a collection of stories from the life of the reporter and journalist as he travels into countries such as Congo, Kenya and Nigeria, then undergoing severe conflict.

== Critical reception ==
Hartford Courant reporter Dylan Foley called it "a masterpiece of war journalism."

Filming rights to the book have been purchased by Philippe Falardeau.

== Veracity ==
The book tells the story of Amelia Bolaños, a Salvadoran teenager whose suicide following the first match was turned into a rallying cry by the Salvadoran media and fans; this story has since been debunked.
