= Hanseatic Goethe Prize =

German literary and artistic award

The Hanseatic Goethe Prize (German: Hansischer Goethe-Preis) was a German literary and artistic award, given biennially from 1949 to 2005 to a figure of European stature. The prize money was €25,000. On the occasion of Goethe's 200th birthday, the Freiherr vom Stein Foundation in Hamburg endowed a cultural prize "for important personalities in the intellectual life". The prize was awarded by the foundation of the Hamburg businessman Alfred Toepfer, Alfred Toepfer Foundation F. V. S..

== Recipients ==
- 1951 Martin Buber
- 1955 T. S. Eliot
- 1956 Walter Gropius
- 1958 Paul Tillich
- 1961 Benjamin Britten
- 1967 Salvador de Madariaga
- 1969 Robert Minder (French Germanist)
- 1971 Giorgio Strehler
- 1973 Manès Sperber
- 1974 Hanns Lilje
- 1975 Carlo Schmid
- 1989 Carl Friedrich von Weizsäcker
- 1995 Nikolaus Harnoncourt
- 1997 Harald Weinrich
- 1999 Ryszard Kapuściński
- 2001 Pina Bausch
- 2003 Cees Nooteboom
- 2005 Ariane Mnouchkine (refused, because of Toepfer's activities in and for the Third Reich)

== See also ==
- German literature
- List of literary awards
- List of poetry awards
- List of years in literature
- List of years in poetry
- Goethe Prize
