= Leopold Unger =

Polish-Belgian journalist and columnist

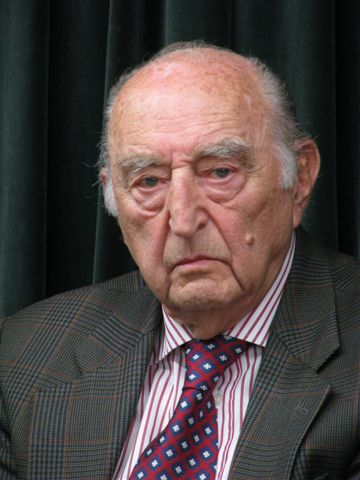
- Unger in 2009
- Born: August 12, 1922; Lwów, Poland (now Lviv, Ukraine)
- Died: December 20, 2011 (aged 89); Brussels, Belgium
- Other names: Brukselczyk, Pol Mathil
- Occupations: Journalist, columnist, essayist
- Known for: Contributions to Le Soir, Gazeta Wyborcza, Kultura, and the International Herald Tribune
- Notable work: Essays in Kultura and Gazeta Wyborcza
- Awards: Honorary doctorate from Maria Curie-Skłodowska University (2009)

Leopold Unger (12 August 1922 – 20 December 2011) was a journalist, columnist, and essayist.

Unger was born in Lwów, Poland (now Lviv, Ukraine). Nicknamed Brukselczyk and Pol Mathil, during World War II, he sought refuge in Romania. He began his career in 1948 in Bucharest as correspondent for the Polish Press Agency. After the war, he worked in Warsaw for the daily newspaper, Życie Warszawy. In 1967, he was laid off for political reasons, then forced to leave Poland in 1969 in the wake of the a 1968 antisemitic campaign launched by the communist authorities.

Unger lived in Brussels from 1969, and wrote for the Brussels daily, Le Soir, as columnist, specialising in international affairs, mainly in the ex-USSR and Eastern Europe. He was formerly a fellow at the Wilson Center for International Scholars in Washington D.C. Between 1974 and 1982, he was a columnist for the International Herald Tribune in Paris, a regular commentator for the Polish Section of Radio Free Europe and, temporarily, for the Polish Section of the BBC.

Unger published a monthly essay in Kultura (Paris), edited by Jerzy Giedroyc, a major Polish émigré democratic opposition forum. Since 1990, he has been writing a regular column for the Warsaw daily, Gazeta Wyborcza On 30 June 2009, he received an honorary doctorate from the Maria Curie-Skłodowska University in Lublin. He died in Brussels, aged 89. He was buried on December 23, 2011, in the Jewish part of the municipal cemetery in Kraainem.
