= Jerzy Pański =

Polish publisher

Jerzy Pański (1900 – 1979) was a Polish postwar communist activist, publisher and translator of French and Russian literature. Between 1946 and 1948 he was the director of Polish Radio. Between 1948 and 1950, he was appointed the president of the publishing house "Czytelnik", and between 1951 and 1953, the director of the Central Committee on Theatres in the Party. After the 1956 Gomułka's thaw he headed the programming department of Polish television until 1962.
