= Another Day of Life (film) =

2018 film directed by Raúl de la Fuente and Damian Nenow

- Polish theatrical release poster
- Polish: Jeszcze dzień życia
- Spanish: Un día más con vida
- Directed by: Raul de la Fuente; Damian Nenow
- Screenplay by: Raul de la Fuente; Amaia Remirez; David Weber; Niall Johnson; Damian Nenow
- Based on: Another Day of Life by Ryszard Kapuściński
- Produced by: Jarosław Sawko; Amaia Remirez; Ole Wendorff-Østergaard; Stefan Schubert; Eric Goossens
- Cinematography: Raul De La Fuente; Gorka Gómez Andreu
- Edited by: Raul De La Fuente
- Music by: Mikel Salas
- Animation by: Rafał Wojtunik; Rafał Kidziński; Dominik Wawrzyniak
- Production company: List: Platige Image (producer); Kanaki Films (producer); Puppetworks Animation Studio (co-producer); Animationsfabrik (co-production); Umedia (co-production); Walking The Dog (co-production); Wüste Film (co-production); Eurimages (co-financed by); MEDIA Programme of the European Union (co-financed by); Polski Instytut Sztuki Filmowej (co-financed by)
- Distributed by: Next Film (Poland)
- Release date: 11 May 2018 (Cannes Film Festival)
- Running time: 85 minutes
- Countries: Poland; Spain; Belgium; Germany; Hungary
- Languages: English, Portuguese, Polish, Spanish
- Budget: €7,700,000
- Box office: $350,796

Another Day of Life (Polish: Jeszcze dzień życia) is a 2018 adult animated drama film directed by Raúl de la Fuente and Damian Nenow, based on Ryszard Kapuściński's autobiographical account, Another Day of Life. It is a co-production between Poland, Spain, Belgium, Germany and Hungary.

== Cast ==
- Miroslaw Haniszewski – Ryszard Kapuściński
- Vergil J. Smith – Queiroz / Luis Alberto / Nelson
- Tomasz Zietek – Farrusco
- Celia Manuel - Carlota /Dona Cartagina / Woman on the road
- Olga Boladz – Carlota / Dona Cartagina
- Rafal Fudalej – Friedkin / Student
- Pawel Paczesny – Portuguese soldier / Carlos
- Jakub Kamienski – Luis Alberto / Nelson / Daddy
- Kerry Shale – Ryszard Kapuściński (voice)
- Daniel Flynn – Queiroz (voice)
- Youssef Kerkour – Farrusco (voice)
- Lillie Flynn – Carlota (voice)
- Akie Kotabe – Friedkin / Student (voice)
- Ben Elliot – Portuguese soldier (voice)
- Emma Tate - Dona Cartagina (voice)
- Jude Owusu – Carlos (voice)
- Martin Sherman – Luis Alberto / Nelson (voice)
- William Vanderpuye – Daddy (voice)
- Wilson Benedito – Soldier (voice)

== Awards and accolades ==
Date	Ceremony	Category	Recipient(s)	Result	Ref.
19 May 2018	71st Cannes Film Festival	Golden Eye, The Documentary Prize	Another Day of Life	Nominated	
21 June 2018	Biografilm Festival	Best Film Unipol Award	Another Day of Life	Nominated	
21 June 2018	Biografilm Festival	Jury Special Mention	Another Day of Life	Won	
21 June 2018	Biografilm Festival	Audience Award - International Competition	Another Day of Life	Won	
22 September 2018	43rd Polish Film Festival in Gdynia	Golden Claw - Visions Apart Competition	Another Day of Life	Nominated	
28 September 2018	2nd El Gouna Film Festival	Golden Star - Feature Documentary Competition	Another Day of Life	Nominated	
28 September 2018	2nd El Gouna Film Festival	Audience Award	Another Day of Life	Won	
29 September 2018	66th San Sebastián International Film Festival	Perl Selection	Another Day of Life	Nominated	
29 September 2018	66th San Sebastián International Film Festival	City of Donostia Audience Award	Another Day of Life	Won	
14 October 2018	4th Olsztyn WAMA Film Festival	Audience Award	Another Day of Life	Won	
28 October 2018	16th Tofifest	Golden Angel	Another Day of Life	Nominated	
8 December 2018	2nd Emile Awards	Best Direction in a Feature Film	Damian Nenow, Raul de la Fuente	Nominated	
8 December 2018	2nd Emile Awards	Best Writing in a Feature Film Production	Raul de la Fuente, Amaia Remirez, Niall Johnson, David Weber, Damian Nenow	Nominated	
8 December 2018	2nd Emile Awards	Best Background & Character Design in a Feature Film Production	Rafał Wojtunik	Nominated	
8 December 2018	2nd Emile Awards	Best Soundtrack in a Feature Film Production	Mikel Salas	Nominated	
8 December 2018	2nd Emile Awards	Best Sound Design in a Feature Film Production	Oriol Tarragó	Nominated	
15 December 2018	31st European Film Awards	Best European Animated Feature Film	Another Day of Life	Won	
2 February 2019	33rd Goya Awards	Best Animated Film	Another Day of Life	Won	
11 March 2019	Tokyo Anime Award Festival 2019	Feature Animation Competition Grand Prize	Another Day of Life	Won	
