= Kazimierz Nowak =

Polish photographer and reporter (1897–1937)

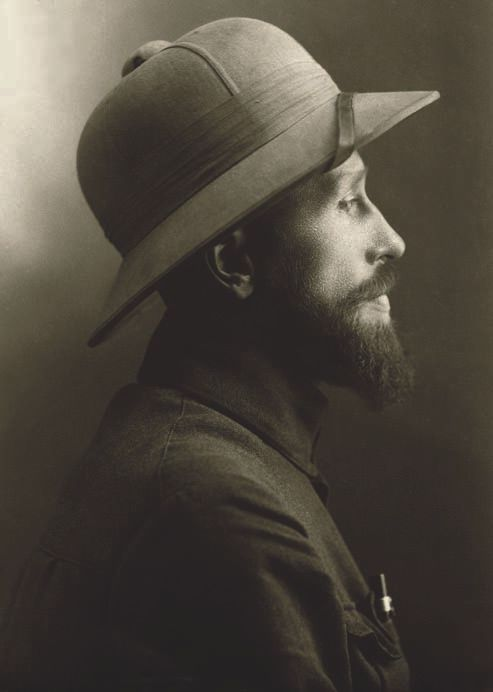
- Born: 11 January 1897; Stryj, Austrian Poland (now in Ukraine)
- Died: 13 October 1937 (aged 40); Poznań, Poland
- Occupations: Traveler; correspondent; photographer

Kazimierz Nowak (11 January 1897 in Stryj – 13 October 1937 in Poznań) was a Polish traveler, correspondent, reporter and photographer.

== Life ==
Born in Stryj, Nowak lived in Poznań following World War I. From 1931 to 1936, he traveled alone, by bicycle, on foot, on horse, by boat and on camel across Africa, covering a distance of 40,000 km from Libya to Cape Agulhas, South Africa and back to Algeria. He died in Poznań from pneumonia as a consequence of emaciation of the body due to travel, malaria, and leg surgery. Photographs from his African travel were published in Poland in 1962 on the album Przez Czarny Ląd (Across the Black Land). The book was edited by Nowak's daughter Elżbieta Nowak-Gliszewska and photographs were selected after consultation with professors Jan Czekanowski and Jerzy Loth. Kazimierz Nowak's accounts of the travel were first published jointly only as late as 2000, in a book entitled Rowerem i pieszo przez Czarny Ląd (Across the Dark Continent). The Polish reporter Ryszard Kapuściński said in 2006 that it "is an utterly exceptional book", and added that:

Its content and the personality of the writer account for its compelling nature. As such, it should command greater attention and wider recognition. This incredible story unfailingly features in my lectures, discussions and commentaries on international affairs. I ardently hope that it will take place among the classics of Polish reportage.

National Geographic Traveler (Polish edition) wrote that "Kazimierz Nowak is without a doubt a master of travel reportage". On 25 November 2006, in the Hall of Poznań Main Railway Station where Nowak began and ended his travel, Ryszard Kapuściński unveiled a commemorative plaque dedicated to Nowak.

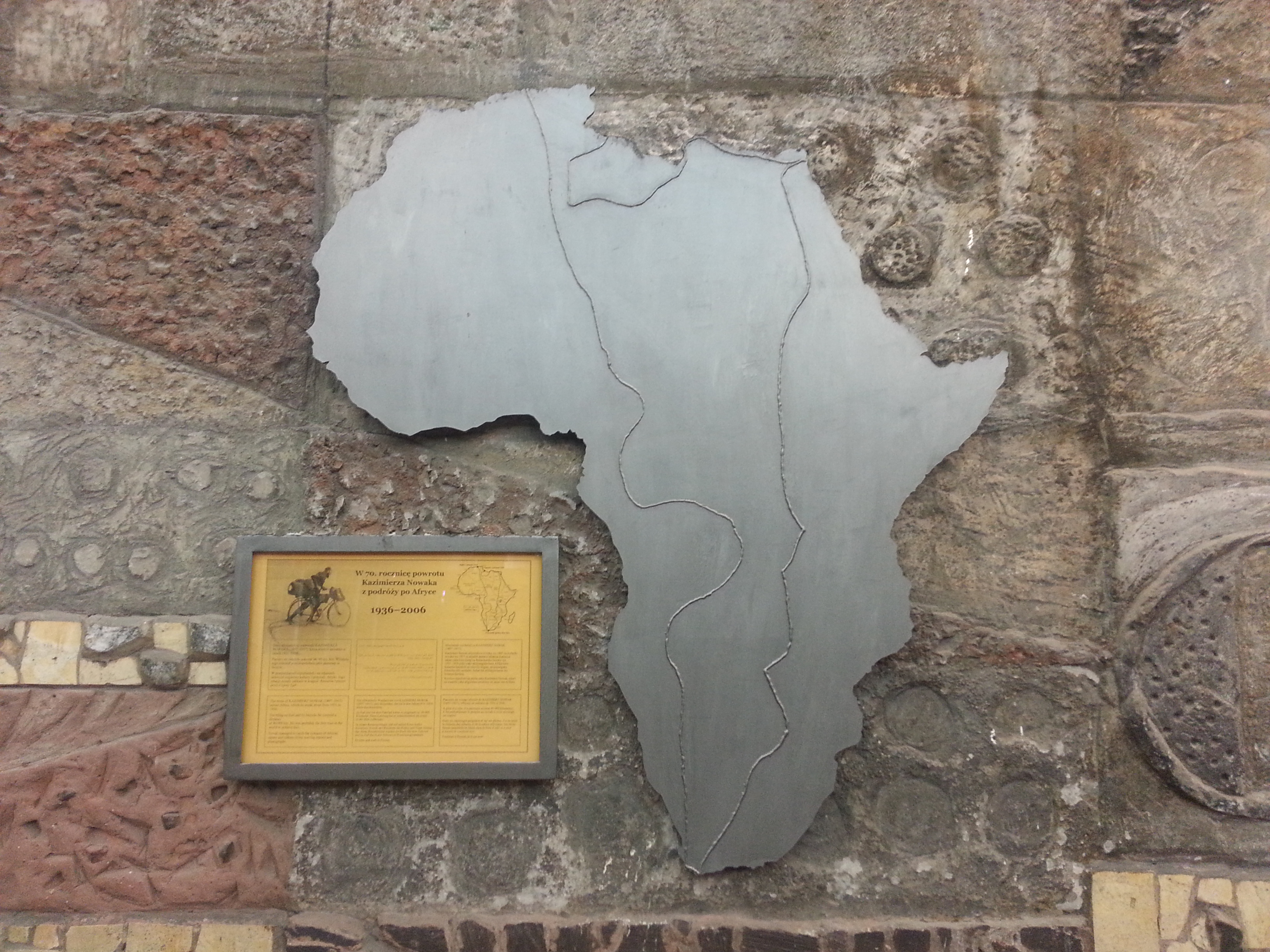
Monument in Poznań dedicated to Kazimierz and his trip across Africa

The 7th extended Polish edition of the book was published in 2013. The book was translated into Hungarian language in 2014 (Kerékpárral és gyalog a fekete földrészen át) and into English in 2017 (Across The Dark Continent. Bicycle Diaries from Africa, 1931–1936).

In 2011 Jacek Y. Łuczak wrote Nowak's biography Polska Kazimierza Nowaka. Przewodnik rowerzysty (Kazimierz Nowak's Poland. A Cyclist's Guidebook). The book describes places in Poland Nowak visited during his 4 bicycle travels in the years 1925–1930 (1925–1926: around Europe; 1927–1928: Europe and North Africa; 1928: around Poland; 1930: Southern Poland and Western Europe).

In 2014 the first volume of Nowak's letters from African travel to his wife were published in Poland as Kochana Maryś! Listy z Afryki. The second volume was published in 2015 and the third in 2016. The last volume has been released in 2022

In 2023, the book Alleen door Afrika - de opzienbarende reis van Kazimierz Nowak (Alone across Africa - the remarkable journey of Kazimierz Nowak) was published, authored by Flemish author Tom Ysewijn, detailing the entire journey.

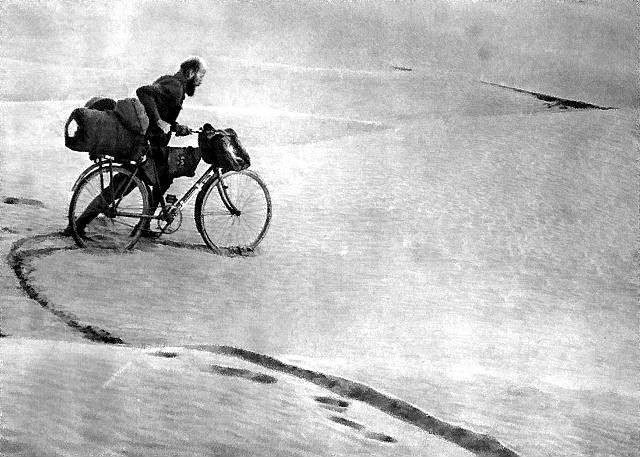
Kazimierz Nowak crossing a desert in Africa, c. 1931–36
