= Travels with Herodotus =

Non-fiction book by Ryszard Kapuściński

- First edition (Polish)
- Author: Ryszard Kapuściński
- Original title: Podróże z Herodotem
- Cover artist: Klara Glowczewska
- Language: Polish
- Genre: Non-fiction/Autobiography
- Publisher: Znak
- Publication date: 2004
- Publication place: Poland
- Media type: Print (Paperback)
- Pages: 284
- ISBN: 9788307034058

Travels with Herodotus (Polish: Podróże z Herodotem) is a non-fiction book written by the Polish journalist, Ryszard Kapuściński, published in 2004. The book mixes together a collection of Kapuściński's own experiences connected to his work in India, China and Africa, and philosophical themes with excerpts from the book The Histories by Herodotus which serves not only as a companion in his often long and occasionally perilous journeys but also as a guide to the conflicts that waged in current times (such as East vs. West and the debate over whether many European customs originally came from Africa). The book was translated into English by Klara Glowczewska.

== See also ==
- Polish literature
- List of Polish writers
