= Polish Telegraphic Agency =

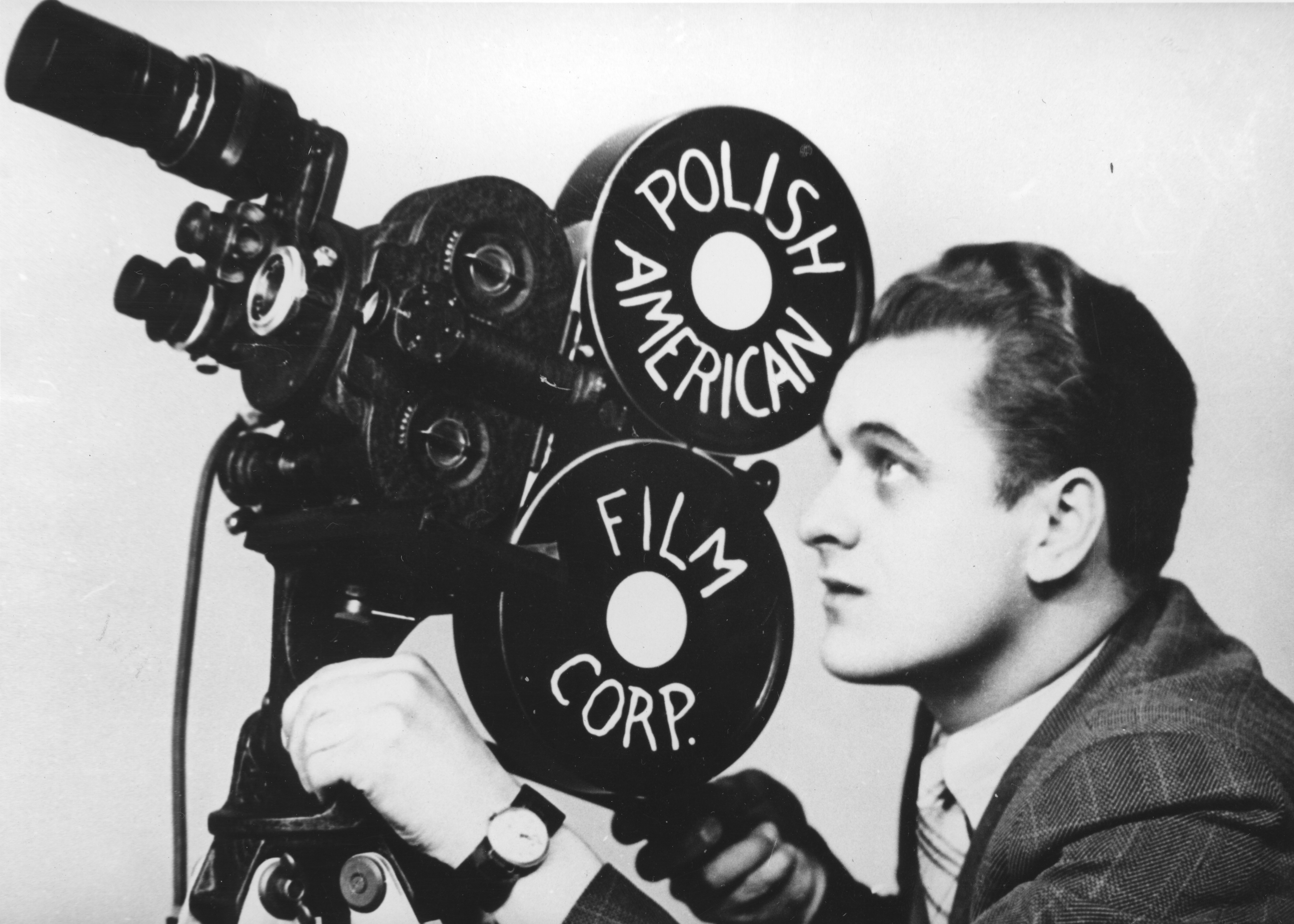
Kazimierz Karasiewicz, PAT war correspondent at work, 1940s.

The Polish Telegraphic Agency (Polish: Polska Agencja Telegraficzna, PAT) was a Polish state-owned news agency established on October 31, 1918. Its main office was at first located in Kraków. Later, it was moved to Lwów, and finally to Warsaw, where it remained until the 1939 Invasion of Poland.

As the only such agency in the Second Polish Republic, the PAT was the official supplier of news on Poland both for the Polish press and foreign media (through 14 yearly bulletins issued in a number of languages, including Polish, French, English and German). Since 1927, the PAT also issued a weekly newsreel. After the Soviet and German take-over of Poland in 1939, the PAT continued its service abroad as the news agency of the Polish Government in Exile. In 1991, it was officially united with the Polish Press Agency operating in Poland. It is also considered a distant predecessor of the Polish Information Agency.

== Operations ==
The bulletins, issued by the PAT, were main source of information about Poland for foreign press. They provided political, economic, cultural and sports news. In 1927, the agency produced its first, 10-minute-long weekly newsreels. They were shown in Polish cinemas prior to the main film, and this custom was continued after World War II, with the Communist-sponsored Polish Film Chronicle. Until September 1939, some 600 newsreels were produced. Only 100 survived the war, as following the Warsaw Uprising, archives of the PAT were destroyed.

Since 1921, the chairman of the agency was Piotr Gorecki, but after the May Coup, all major posts were handed over to the group of supporters of Jozef Pilsudski. In 1929, the chairman was Roman Starzynski, replaced in July 1933 by Konrad Libicki. Last prewar chairman of the PAT was Mieczyslaw Obarski.

Since 1925, it produced a regular newsreel. In 1926, PAT consisted of two departments: information and advertising. In 1927, a separate film department was added. In 1930, the agency established a film and photo studio and started offering a photo service.

In 1935, autonomous film institute was opened, and in the same year, information department was divided into two offices: political, economical, art and culture, sports and provincial news. There also was a separate office handling foreign news. In 1935, the PAT had fourteen local offices, in the following towns: Białystok, Bydgoszcz, Gdynia, Grudziądz, Katowice, Kraków, Lublin, Lwów, Łódź, Łuck, Poznań, Sosnowiec, Toruń and Wilno. It also had ten foreign offices, at Berlin, Free City of Danzig, Geneva, London, Moscow, Paris, New York City, Riga, Rome and Vienna.

In the mid-1930s, the agency employed some 250 correspondents. In 1932, the PAT was merged with National Publishing House (Wydawnictwo Panstwowe), which resulted in opening four bulletins. In 1935, the agency signed advertising agreements with three major state monopolies: Polish Spirit Monopoly, Polish Tobacco Monopoly, and General Savings Bank.

== Sources ==
- "Radiotechnika była zalążkiem rozwoju elektroniki dziedziny" (in Polish). Archived from the original on 8 March 2010.
