= Polish Film Chronicle =

The Polish Film Chronicle (Polish: Polska Kronika Filmowa) (1944–95) was a 10-minute-long newsreel shown in Polish cinemas prior to the main film. It continued the traditions of the pre-war Polish Telegraphic Agency, and in Communist Poland was often used as a propaganda tool. The chronicle was for the first time presented in Polish cinemas on December 1, 1944. It was produced biweekly by Warsaw's Wytwornia Filmow Dokumentalnych i Fabularnych (Documentary and Feature Film Studio, WFDiF), with cooperation of the “Czołówka” Film Studio.

The chronicle presented current events, economy, sports and culture news, commentaries and opinion journalism, also entertainment like private life of Irena Szewińska. Usually one newsreel consisted of five parts, each describing a different topic. In some cases, such as official holiday (e.g. International Workers' Day) the whole newsreel was dedicated to the events of this holiday. Apart from cinemas, the chronicle was also presented in the 1960s by the Polish Television. In few selected cases the chronicle presented news from outside of Poland but this was rare as it concentrated on domestic issues.

The first editor-in-chief of the Polish Film Chronicle was Jerzy Bossak, and among its speakers were such renowned actors such as Władysław Hańcza and Andrzej Łapicki. Among other personalities who cooperated with the chronicle were Andrzej Munk and Władysław Szpilman. Almost all newsreels are black and white, although already in the 1950s the first colour productions were made with Sovcolor technology. Among colour newsreels are those which describe events of special importance, such as the 1952 construction of the Palace of Culture and Science in Warsaw, the 1953 reconstruction of the Warsaw Old Town, the '1000 years of Poland Parade' in (1966), or Mirosław Hermaszewski’s flight (1978).

The Polish Film Chronicle was cancelled at cinemas on January 1, 1995. Warsaw's Documentary and Feature Film Studio still exists and continues to make newsreels.

== Sources ==
- Historia o historii, czyli Polska Kronika Filmowa. Polish Radio article about the chronicle. 28.01.2013
