= Ryszard Kapuściński =

Polish journalist, photographer and author (1932–2007)

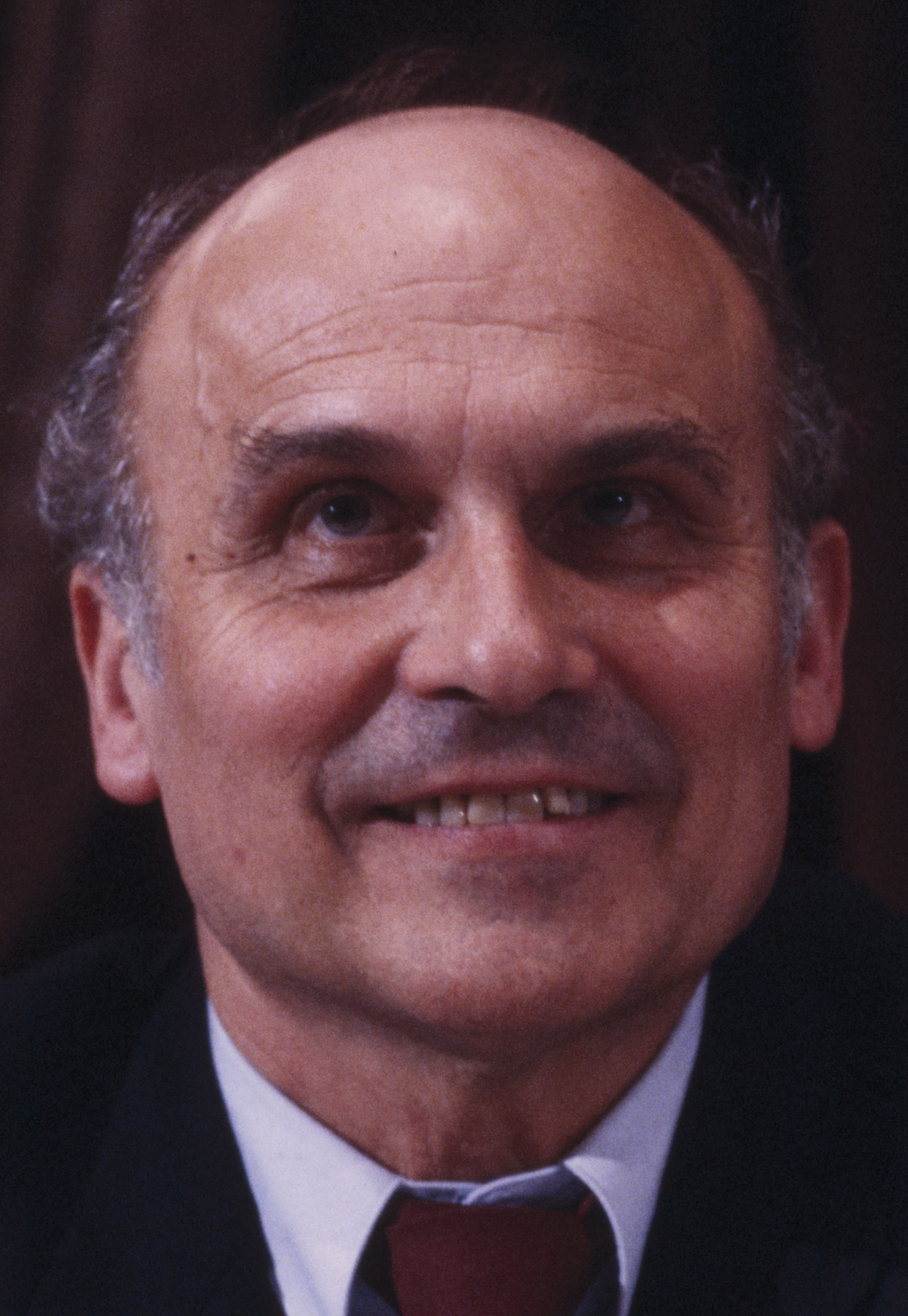
- Kapuściński in 1986
- Born: 4 March 1932; Pińsk, Poland
- Died: 23 January 2007 (aged 74); Warsaw, Poland
- Burial place: Powązki Military Cemetery
- Education: University of Warsaw
- Occupations: Author and journalist
- Awards: Order of Polonia Restituta; 1997; Hanseatic Goethe Prize; 1999; Prince of Asturias Award; 2003

Ryszard Kapuściński (Polish: [ˈrɨʂart kapuˈɕt͡ɕij̃skʲi]; 4 March 1932 – 23 January 2007) was a Polish journalist, photographer and author. He received many prestigious awards and was considered a candidate for the Nobel Prize in Literature. Kapuściński's personal journals in book form attracted both controversy and admiration for blurring the conventions of reportage with the allegory and magical realism of literature. He was the Communist-era Polish Press Agency's only correspondent in Africa during decolonization, and also worked in South America and Asia. Between 1956 and 1981 he reported on 27 revolutions and coups, until he was fired because of his support for the pro-democracy Solidarity movement in his native country. He was celebrated by other practitioners of the genre; Tiziano Terzani, Gabriel García Márquez, and Luis Sepúlveda accorded him the title "Maestro".

Notable works include Jeszcze dzień życia (1976; Another Day of Life), about Angola; Cesarz (1978; The Emperor, 1983), about the downfall of Ethiopian ruler Haile Selassie, also considered to be a satire of Communist Poland; Wojna futbolowa (1978; The Soccer War, 1991), an account of the 1969 conflict between Honduras and El Salvador, and other stories from the life of the reporter in Africa and Latin America; Szachinszach (1982; Shah of Shahs, 2006) about the downfall of the last Shah of Iran; Imperium (1993), an account of his travels through the collapsing Soviet Union; Heban (1998), later published in English as The Shadow of the Sun (2001), the story of his years in Africa; and Podróże z Herodotem (2004; Travels with Herodotus), in which he ponders over relevance of The Histories by Herodotus to a modern reporter's job.

== Biography ==
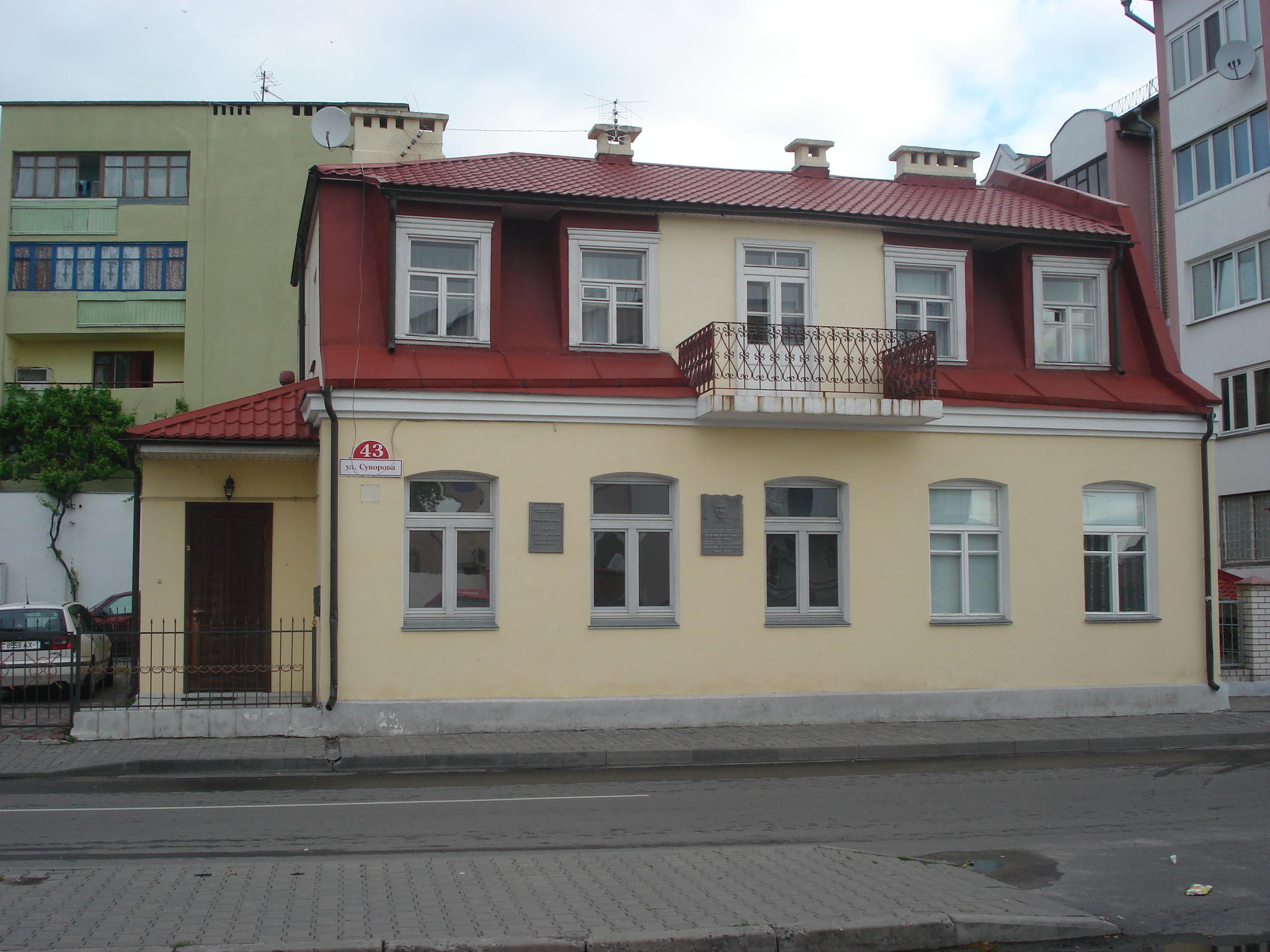
House where Kapuściński's family lived in Pinsk in the 1930s (photo from 2009) at Błotna Street (now Suvorov Street 43)

Ryszard Kapuściński was born in Pinsk (now in Belarus), Polesie Voivodeship, in the Kresy Wschodnie or eastern borderlands of the Second Polish Republic in 1932, the son of Maria Bobka and Józef Kapuściński, primary school teachers. His sister Barbara was born the following year. They were born into poverty: he would later say that he felt at home in Africa as "food was scarce there too and everyone was also barefoot." In September 1938 Ryszard started attending Primary School No 5 in Pinsk. He spent the summer of 1939 together with his mother and sister in Pawłów, a small village near Rejowiec in Lublin Voivodeship. When the Second World War began in September 1939 they came back to Pinsk after the city was captured by the Red Army and Ryszard returned to school there. In 1940 Maria, afraid of deportation to the East, together with Ryszard and Barbara left Pinsk and moved to Sieraków, near Warsaw. There they met Józef. Later the family moved near Otwock. Ryszard continued education in primary school in Otwock (1944–45). He described his early life in the book Imperium.

In 1945 the family settled in Warsaw where Ryszard began education in Stanisław Staszic Gymnasium. He became an amateur boxer (bantamweight) and football player. In 1948, Kapuściński joined the official Communist youth organisation—the ZMP—and served lower rank posts. Kapuściński was the hero of the article published in the weekly periodical Odrodzenie reporting on a poetry conference organised at his school, in which the teenager's poems were compared with works of Mayakovsky and Wierzyński.

In June 1950 he graduated from Gymnasium and started working for the Sztandar Młodych (The Banner of Youth), a nationwide newspaper founded in 1950 as the organ of the ZMP. In October 1950 he began his studies at Warsaw University (Department of Polish Studies) and in 1951 he moved to the department of history after he suspended working for Sztandar Młodych till 1955. He participated in the Youth Festival in East Berlin staged in August 1951 in East Germany. This was his first foreign trip. From 1952 and till his death Ryszard Kapuściński was married to doctor Alicja Mielczarek (1933–2022). Their daughter Zofia was born in 1953. During the period from 1953 to 1981—the year of the imposition of the martial law in Poland—Kapuściński was a member of the Polish United Workers' Party (the PZPR). His attitude to the PZPR changed early on, "the decisive moment having come in the year 1956" (presumably a reference to the events of Poznań June and the process of de-Stalinisation brought about by the Thaw of Gomułka, and the Hungarian Revolution of 1956).

In June 1955 he graduated from Warsaw University. After publishing, in September 1955, a critical article about the construction of Nowa Huta, a Kraków conurbation built on a site chosen as the "first socialist municipality in Poland", which brought to light the inhuman working and living conditions of the labourers involved in the venture—a story which occasioned consternation before eventually winning favour with the Communist authorities unsure at first how to react to a fault-finding depiction of their pet project by one of their own—Kapuściński was awarded the Golden Cross of Merit at the age of 23.

In August 1956 he reported from Kyiv and in September he was sent to India, his first travel outside Europe. He returned via Afghanistan (where he was detained at the airport in Kabul) and Moscow. In August 1957 he went for half a year to China (via Tokyo and Hong Kong). He came back to Poland by the Trans-Siberian Railway. Beginning with that journey to India undertaken at the age of 24, he travelled across the developing world reporting on wars, coups and revolutions in Africa, Asia, and Latin America. He started learning English in India by reading, with the help of a dictionary, a copy of Hemingway's For Whom the Bell Tolls. He wrote about his first travels to Asia in the book Travels with Herodotus.

In 1958 he left Sztandar Młodych and started working for the Polish Press Agency. Shortly afterwards he also joined the weekly Polityka (where he worked till 1962). The result of his work for the weekly was the book Busz po polsku (The Polish Bush) published in 1962, a collection of his articles from the "Polish wilderness" that he went into to relate "the perspectives of forgotten, invisible, marginal people and so to record a living history of those seldom deemed worthy to enter the annals of official history" (in the words of Diana Kuprel, the literary scholar and translator of Kapuściński's works). He was aggrieved at the indifference of the reading public towards the majority of his early books.

In the late 1950s he went for the first time to Africa (Ghana, Republic of Dahomey and Niger). After honing his skills on domestic stories he was later "'responsible' for fifty countries" for the Polish Press Agency in Africa (although a correspondent of an official state press agency, he never in his life asked a single question at any press conference that he attended). When he finally returned to Poland, he had lived through twenty-seven revolutions and coups, been jailed 40 times and survived four death sentences. In the English-speaking world, Kapuściński is best known for his reporting from Africa in the 1960s and 1970s, when he witnessed first-hand the end of the European colonial empires on that continent.

In 1961 he reported from the Republic of the Congo. He described his escape to Bujumbura and subsequent arrest in the book The Soccer War. In the years 1962–65 he lived initially in Dar es Salaam and later in Nairobi from where he travelled to other countries in Africa. He came back to Poland for only a few weeks in 1965 but returned to Africa to live in Lagos and continue reporting. In April 1965 he travelled to Senegal and Mauritania which he later described in the book The Shadow of the Sun. At the end of 1966 he came back to Poland. In April 1967 he went to Central Asia and Caucasus. In November the same year he started working as a foreign correspondent in South America, based in Santiago. Later he moved to Mexico (1969–72). In 1969 he witnessed war in Honduras which he described in the book The Soccer War. In 1969 he edited and translated from the Spanish El diario del Che en Bolivia, the final literary bequest of Che Guevara. Kapuściński analyzed the situation in Guatemala after a German diplomat Karl von Spreti was kidnapped. He published his reportage in 1970 entitled Dlaczego zginął Karl von Spreti (Why Karl von Spreti Died). He returned to Poland in 1972 and later worked for magazines Kontynenty and Kultura. In September 1975 he went to Angola after which he published the book Another Day of Life. In 1975 and 1977 he went to Ethiopia. The Emperor was written after his travels there. In 1979 he visited his birthplace Pinsk for the first time since 1940. In 1979 he went to Iran to witness the Iranian Revolution. His book Shah of Shahs deals with this subject and the fall of Mohammad Reza Pahlavi, the last Shah of Iran.

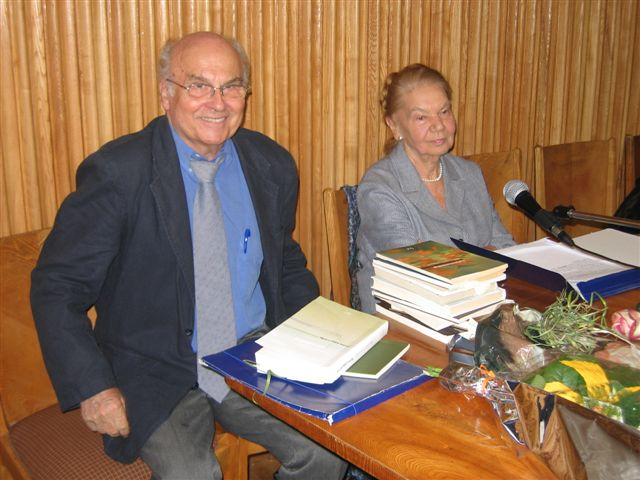
Kapuściński with Julia Hartwig in Warsaw, 2006

In 1980 he witnessed the strikes that took place in Gdańsk, Poland. In 1988 two episodes of Arena were dedicated to him and his work. He travelled in European and Asian parts of the Soviet Union (1989–1992) and witnessed the dissolution of the Soviet Union. After this experience he wrote Imperium. He was awarded German Academic Exchange Service scholarship in Berlin in 1994. In 1999 Kapuściński talked about his life in VPRO in a series of autobiographical interviews with prominent people from the worlds of science, culture and politics.

In a 2006 interview with Reuters, Kapuściński said that he wrote for "people everywhere still young enough to be curious about the world." He was fluent in Polish, English, Russian, Spanish, French and Portuguese. He was visiting professor in Bangalore (1970s), Bonn, Cape Town, Caracas (1979), Columbia University (1983), Harvard University, Irkutsk, London, Madrid, Mexico (1979), San Sebastian, Temple University (1988) and Vancouver.

Kapuściński died on 23 January 2007, of a heart attack suffered in a Warsaw hospital where he was being treated for unrelated ailments.

== Literary works ==
From the early 1960s onwards, Kapuściński published books of increasing literary craftsmanship characterized by sophisticated narrative technique, psychological portraits of characters, a wealth of stylization and metaphor and unusual imagery that serves as means of interpreting the perceived world. Kapuściński's best-known book, The Emperor, concerns itself with the decline of Haile Selassie's anachronistic régime in Ethiopia. The book's story had a special meaning that was not lost on the people of Poland, especially as dissent against the PZPR was taking root. The Emperor was also the book that established Kapuściński's reputation in the West. When it appeared in English translation in 1983 it received an immediate critical success. In 1987 the book was adapted by Michael Hastings and Jonathan Miller into a theatre play, produced by the Royal Court Theatre, London.

Kapuściński: We know everything about the global problem of poverty. What we can't figure out is how to reduce it in practical terms. [The moment we try] there appear obstacles that cannot be surmounted, and interests one cannot go against.

— From an interview with Kapuściński published in Press magazine, 2006

Kapuściński was fascinated by the humanity he found in different worlds and people, as well as the books of these worlds and people: he approached foreign countries first through literature, spending months reading before each trip. He was skilled in listening to the diverse people he met, but he was also capable of "reading" the hidden sense of the scenes he encountered: the way the Europeans moved out of Angola, a discussion regarding alimony in the Tanganyikan parliament, the reconstruction of frescoes in the new Russia—he turned each of these vignettes into a metaphor of historical transformation.

This tendency to process private experiences into a greater social synthesis made Kapuściński an eminent thinker, and the volumes of the ongoing Lapidarium series are a record of the shaping of a reporter's observations into philosophical reflections on the world, its people and their suffering.

Kapuściński himself called his work "literary reportage", and reportage d'auteur. In the English-speaking world, his genre is sometimes characterised as "magic journalism" (in counterpoint to magic realism), a term coined by Adam Hochschild in 1994. Kapuściński often introduced himself with the line "I am a poor reporter who unfortunately lacks the imagination of a writer".

Italian journalist Tiziano Terzani and Ryszard Kapuściński shared a similar vision of journalism. Jaime Abello Banfi, the friend and associate of Gabriel García Márquez, reports that García Márquez and Kapuściński, unbeknownst to each other, shared the opinion that the way to good journalism led through poetry (because it inculcates both the conciseness of expression and its aptness).

Kapuściński considered the ancient Greek historian Herodotus a great reporter and his master. He wrote a book Travels with Herodotus where he shows that the Histories of Herodotus are timeless and the masterpiece of reportage. He also considered Melchior Wańkowicz, Ksawery Pruszyński, Curzio Malaparte and Franciszek Gil (1917–1960) to have been his literary models and stylistic precursors. On some level, Pruszyński and Wańkowicz shared a very similar approach to facts with Kapuściński, believing that the general picture of the story can be glued from bits and pieces to reveal a truth as a wholly independent construct. Students of Kapuściński's work observed correspondences between his work and that of J. M. Coetzee in that both writers were supposedly beholden to the theory of "the responsibility of witness".

One reviewer saw in Kapuściński's mixing of subtle psychological reflection with vivid description an invitation to a comparison with Joseph Conrad; Binyavanga Wainaina and Aleksandar Hemon made the same comparison, if for other, less laudatory reasons. Kapuściński confirmed to Bill Deedes the fact that Conrad was one of his literary inspirations. Neal Ascherson likened him to Egon Erwin Kisch (1885–1948) considered the father of literary reportage. Kapuściński himself cites Kisch with approval as the "classic of reportage" who dealt a death blow to traditional forms of reporting by putting the person of the reporter at centre stage. Certainly, neither Kisch nor Kapuściński believed in what might be called "journalistic objectivity": whereas Kisch thought it necessary for a (Communist) reporter to "engage politically" with his subject, Kapuściński would put objectivity as a concept out of court altogether, stating explicitly, "There is no such thing as objectivity. Objectivity is the question of the conscience of the one who writes. And he himself should answer the question is this what he writes close to the truth or not".

Kapuściński's views on his craft were published in 2000 in the book in Italian Il cinico non è adatto a questo mestiere: conversazioni sul buon giornalismo (A Cynic wouldn't Suit This Profession: Conversations about Good Journalism), the book in Spanish from 2003 (distributed for free) Los cinco sentidos del periodista (estar, ver, oír, compartir, pensar) (The Journalist's Five Senses: Witnessing, Seeing, Listening, Sharing and Thinking) and in his Polish book Autoportret reportera (A Reporter's Self Portrait) published the same year. In 1987 Marek Miller talked with Kapuściński on the art of reportage and his life. These conversations were published in Poland in 2012 in the book Pisanie (Writing) but broadcast in Canada on Kalejdoskop Polski TV as early as 1988. He was vocal denouncing manipulations and ignorance of big media.

=== Photographer ===
Kapuściński debuted as a photographer in the year 2000 with the publication of the album entitled Z Afryki ("Out of Africa"), a photographic harvest of his journeys in that continent. "Every snapshot is a recollection, a remembrance," he writes in the introduction, "and nothing can sensitise us more to the fragility of time, to its impermanent and fleeting nature—than photography." A sequel, entitled Ze świata ("From the World", published in November 2008 with the introduction of John Updike), comprising a cross-section of Kapuściński's photographs from all parts of the world, contains some truly outstanding shots.

=== Posthumous and non-reportage works ===
In Ten Inny ("The Other"), a collection of lectures delivered in Vienna, Graz and Kraków, published shortly before his death, Kapuściński laments a state of affairs perpetuated by the myths which inculcate the notion of the Other as sub-human or non-human. He saw encountering the Other as the main challenge for the twenty-first century. The posthumously published Ho dato voce ai poveri: dialogo con i giovani ("I Gave a Voice to the Poor: Conversations with the Youth"; Trent, Il Margine, 2007; subsequently published in Poland as Dałem głos ubogim. Rozmowy z młodzieżą; Kraków, Znak, 2008) is a record of Kapuściński's interactions with the students of the University of Bolzano in Italy in October 2006; while Rwący nurt historii. Zapiski o XX i XXI wieku ("In the Whirlpools of History: Jottings on the 20th and the 21st Centuries"; Kraków, Znak, 2007) is a compilation of interviews and lectures, reflecting Kapuściński's training as a historian and dealing with contemporary issues and their historical and cross-cultural parallels (including such issues as globalisation, Islam, the birth of the Third World, and the dawn of the Pacific civilisation).

Question: Is it possible to describe a war on terror?

Kapuściński: No; this is a web. Its structure is immensely difficult to scrutinize. We have to concede that there are many things in this world which are impossible to delineate.

— From an interview with Kapuściński published in Press magazine, 2006.

Kapuściński's pronouncements on current affairs were noteworthy: he thought that the causes of the 9/11 tragedy, for example, were too complex to lend themselves to an exhaustively thorough analysis at present, although he offered an extensive and sophisticated exposition of some of the key elements of the puzzle in the Clash of Civilisations. He was critical on the Clash of Civilisations theory which he saw as an American vision of the world. He told a BBC interviewer right after the attacks: "I greatly fear that we will waste this moment. That instead of meaningful dialogue, it will just be gates and metal detectors".

In an interview granted in 2002 to the then editor-in-chief of the monthly Letras Libres, Ricardo Cayuela Gally, Kapuściński opined that the war on terror, owing to the asymmetrical character of the combatants engaged in it, could only be won—and indeed easily, within a month—through a (re)introduction of "Stalinism", a method undesirable for the sole reason that it would leave the world under the permanent "hegemony" of the United States, a circumstance that would spell the end of "the free society".

In Poland, since 1986 Kapuściński was also known as a poet: he privately confided in his Swedish translator, Anders Bodegård, that he considered this to be his primary identity. In November 2007 the Canadian publishing house Biblioasis published Kapuściński's selected poems in English, I Wrote Stone, the first English translation of his poetry. Los Angeles Times wrote: "Big events (...) may have been treated lyrically in his prose, but (...) these poems capture the moments between crises, impressions that carry a book-length argument in a few lines". Collected poems from his books were published in Poland and Canada in 2012 in both Polish and English in the book Collected Poems, translated by Diana Kuprel and Marek Kusiba.

Although he was not the sole model for the role, Kapuściński was given a portrayal as the main character in Andrzej Wajda's 1978 film Without Anesthesia. Aleksandar Hemon, the Bosnian-American novelist (who had previously impugned Robert D. Kaplan's stereotyping of "the Balkan mind"), in a critique of Kapuściński's Africa writings published in The Village Voice, accused Kapuściński's readers of turning a blind eye to "the underlying proto-racist essentialism" that informs his vision of and his approach to the cultures of the continent: "[Kapuściński] fumes against the racism absurdly based on skin colour, and would probably be shocked if told that his obsessive listing of essential differences [between "the African mind" and "the European mind"] is essentially racist".

== Reception ==
Kapuściński had a global reputation, and is one of the Polish writers translated into the highest number of foreign languages.

In an obituary published in Der Spiegel, Kapuściński was described by German journalist Claus Christian Malzahn as "one of the most credible journalists the world has ever seen". Daniel Alarcón, a Peruvian-American novelist, cited Kapuściński as a formative influence together with Dostoyevsky. The American journalist and reportage-writer Richard Bernstein, saw value in the "penetrating intelligence" of Kapuściński's vision and in his "crystallised descriptive" style of writing. The British journalist Bill Deedes, who had witnessed the Rwandan genocide first-hand, said of Kapuściński that what he "writes about Africa is authoritative as well as captivating. His account of how the Hutus and the Tutsis were drawn into that dark night of genocide in Rwanda is the most enlightening I have read anywhere" and that he had "transformed journalism into literature in his writings about Africa". Professor Philip Melling of Swansea University has concurred with this opinion, citing Kapuściński as an authority on the Rwandan conflict.

Salman Rushdie wrote about him: "One Kapuściński is worth more than a thousand whimpering and fantasizing scribblers. His exceptional combination of journalism and art allows us to feel so close to what Kapuściński calls the inexpressible true image of war".

Frequently mentioned as a favorite to win the Nobel Prize in literature, he never did. Kapuściński's dying before he could be awarded the Prize was bemoaned in the Swedish press as late as October 2010. Since his death he has been offered many epitaphs in the press, such as, "The master of modern journalism", "Translator of the World" and "The Greatest Reporter in the World", "Herodotus of our times", "Third World chronicler".

In Kapuściński, the personal search for authenticity is always linked to his relationship to those around him. In his writings, he always seeks the universal in the particular, a trait that John Merrill's ideological opposite in U.S. academic circles, University of Illinois media scholar Clifford G. Christians, would applaud. Truth, Christians has written, is "reason radiated by love", thus individual authenticity must be contingent on links to the other, the "I" always defined by its relationship to "Thou".

— Joseph B. Atkins and Bernard Nežmah, "Ryszard Kapuściński: The Empathetic Existentialist", 2002.

Over the years, particularly since 1983 when The Emperor was named Book of the Year by The Sunday Times of London, Kapuściński was the recipient of many international literary prizes that brought recognition to his creative oeuvre: these included, for example, the biennial Hanseatic Goethe Prize awarded by the Hamburg-based foundation, the Alfred Toepfer Stiftung, which he received in 1999; or the Italian Elsa Morante Prize (Premio Elsa Morante, Sezione Culture D'Europa) in 2005, for his Travels with Herodotus (the new category of the Premio Elsa Morante, called "Cultures of Europe", in effect a separate prize awarded by the same jury, having apparently been created specially for him).

In 2001 Kapuściński received the literary Prix Tropiques of the French Development Agency for his book The Shadow of the Sun, published in France under the title Ébène: Aventures africaines, which had a year earlier been named the best book of the year by the French literary monthly, Lire; the book also won the Italian literary award, Feudo Di Maida Prize (in full, Premio Letterario Internazionale Feudo Di Maida), for the year 2000. That same year (2000) Kapuściński was honoured with the prestigious Premio Internazionale Viareggio-Versilia, as well as having received the Creola Prize (Premio Creola) in Bologna (awarded for travel books and facilitation of intercultural encounters), and the "Premio Letterario 'Della Resistenza'" of the Piedmontese city of Omegna (Premio Omegna).

In 2003 Kapuściński received the Premio Grinzane Cavour per la Lettura in Turin; shared the Prince of Asturias Award (in the category "Communications and Humanities") with the Peruvian theologian Gustavo Gutiérrez; and was awarded the Kreisky Prize (Bruno-Kreisky-Preis für das politische Buch) for the entirety of his work ("Sonderpreis für das publizistische Gesamtwerk"; the award ceremony having taken place in Vienna in May of the following year). As the doyen of literary reportage, he was the keynote speaker at the inaugural ceremony, held in Berlin in October 2003, for the Lettre Ulysses Awards for the Art of Reportage.

In 2005 the Italian edition of Kapuściński's poems (which appeared in print the previous year as Taccuino d'appunti in the translation of Silvano De Fanti) won the state-funded Naples Prize (Premio Napoli). To complete the round-up of Italian prizes, the next year Kapuściński was awarded a special category of the Ilaria Alpi Prize for the entirety of his career (Premio Ilaria Alpi alla carriera), one of the best-known of Italian journalistic awards, named for an Italian investigative reporter murdered in Somalia in 1994 (although the scope of the prize is limited to TV journalism, special categories of prizes for which he would not otherwise qualify—as also for example in the case of the Elsa Morante Prize—have been created for Kapuściński). Kapuściński received honorary doctorates from the University of Silesia (1997), the University of Wrocław (2001), the University of Sofia (2002), the University of Gdańsk (2004), Jagiellonian University (2004). In June 2005 Kapuściński was invested with an honorary doctorate by the private Ramon Llull University of Barcelona, Spain; and in May 2006, just eight months before his death, he received a similar degree from the University of Udine in Italy.

In 2010, Warsaw City Council established the Ryszard Kapuściński Award as a form of distinction and promotion of the most worthwhile reportage books which touch on important contemporary issues, evoke reflection, and deepen our knowledge of the world of other cultures.

=== Controversy and biographies ===
Since at least 1987 Kapuściński's veracity as a reporter has been disputed, and he responded with the explanation that his work had been allegorical. By his own account he chose to avoid dates, names, and orders of events. Since at least 2001, there has been literary debate about to which genre Kapuściński's work should be categorized.

A 2001 review by John Ryle concerned the Kapuściński memoir entitled The Shadow of the Sun released in the same year. Ryle alleged that questions about the reliability of Kapuściński's reportage began with The Emperor. Scrutinizing Kapuściński's translation of expressions of fealty by Ethiopian courtiers, Ryle said that "native speakers of Amharic say that these honorifics correspond to no known expressions in their language." Ryle wrote that he visited Ethiopia in the 1990s when the action of The Shadow of the Sun was taking place. He said there were inaccuracies in the story, for example, that Mengistu's generals did not escape justice and that the 'academics' among them were few and far in between. Ryle noticed that the initials of Kapuściński's informants did not correspond to the names of witnesses in the trial of the Derg in Addis Ababa. He added that Kapuściński's description of the capital devoid of bookstores did not correspond to what he has seen on his last visit there, because he found six bookstores there. He also disputed Kapuściński's assertion that Haile Selassie did not read books by saying he had a library, was well read, and annotated documents.

Ryle continued:

In answer to such criticisms it has been argued that The Emperor is not meant to be about Ethiopia at all, that it is an allegory of Communist power in Poland, or of autocratic regimes in general. ... Like Kapuściński's other books, The Emperor is presented unambiguously as factual reportage and it asserts its claim on the reader's attention as such. ... There is a double standard at work in such excuses, a clear eurocentric bias. Consider the hypothetical case of an author publishing a book of scandalous revelations about the last years of the Gierek regime in communist Poland, using dubious information obtained in obscure circumstances from anonymous and untraceable members of the Polish Internal Security Police. It would not be considered a reasonable defence of such a book to say that it did not matter whether it was true or not because it was really intended, not as a book about Poland, but as an allegorical account of events in imperial Ethiopia. ... Such criticisms do not rob Kapuściński's writing of its bright allure, its illuminating moments, its often lively sympathy for the people of the countries he writes about, but they warn us not to take it seriously as a guide to reality.

Polish scholars Dr. Beata Nowacka (University of Silesia) and Dr. Zygmunt Ziątek (Polish Academy of Sciences) wrote the first biography of Kapuściński, which was published by Znak in 2008 under the title Ryszard Kapuściński. Biografia pisarza. Their monograph was translated in 2010 to Spanish (Kapuscinski. Una biografía literaria) and in 2012 to Italian (Ryszard Kapuściński. Biografia di uno scrittore). Professor Silvano De Fanti from the University of Udine wrote Kapuściński's biography for the Opere (2009), published in Italian in the Meridiani series which aims to collect major writers of all times from all countries.

In 2010, a Polish language monograph titled Kapuściński Non-Fiction written by Artur Domosławski was published in Warsaw. Kapuściński's widow, Alicja Kapuścińska, sought an injunction against Domosławski's book, claiming defamation and invasion of privacy. The injunction was rejected by the Polish court on the grounds that she had chosen to give Domosławski access to her husband's archive. In an interview with The Guardian Domosławski said: "Kapuściński was experimenting in journalism. He wasn't aware he had crossed the line between journalism and literature. I still think his books are wonderful and precious. But ultimately, they belong to fiction." Domosławski's monograph was translated to English in 2012 by Antonia Lloyd-Jones and first published by Verso Books as Ryszard Kapuściński. A Life in 2012.

Neal Ascherson defended Kapuściński in March 2010 by saying: "None of the doubts, as far as I can see, are about the despatches and features he sent to newspapers, or to the Polish Press Agency. They are about his books. The adventures and encounters he describes in his books are on a different level of veracity. Like his friend Gabriel García Márquez, Kapuściński used to talk about "literary reportage". You're meant to believe what you are being told, but not in every literal detail. ... Scrupulous in his journalism, in his books he was capable of inventing to make a truth even truer. He was a great story-teller, but not a liar." Timothy Garton Ash was more critical. Ash wrote later that month (reprinted in his Facts Are Subversive): "with Kapuscinski, we keep crossing from the Kenya of fact to the Tanzania of fiction, and back again, but the transition is nowhere explicitly signalled."

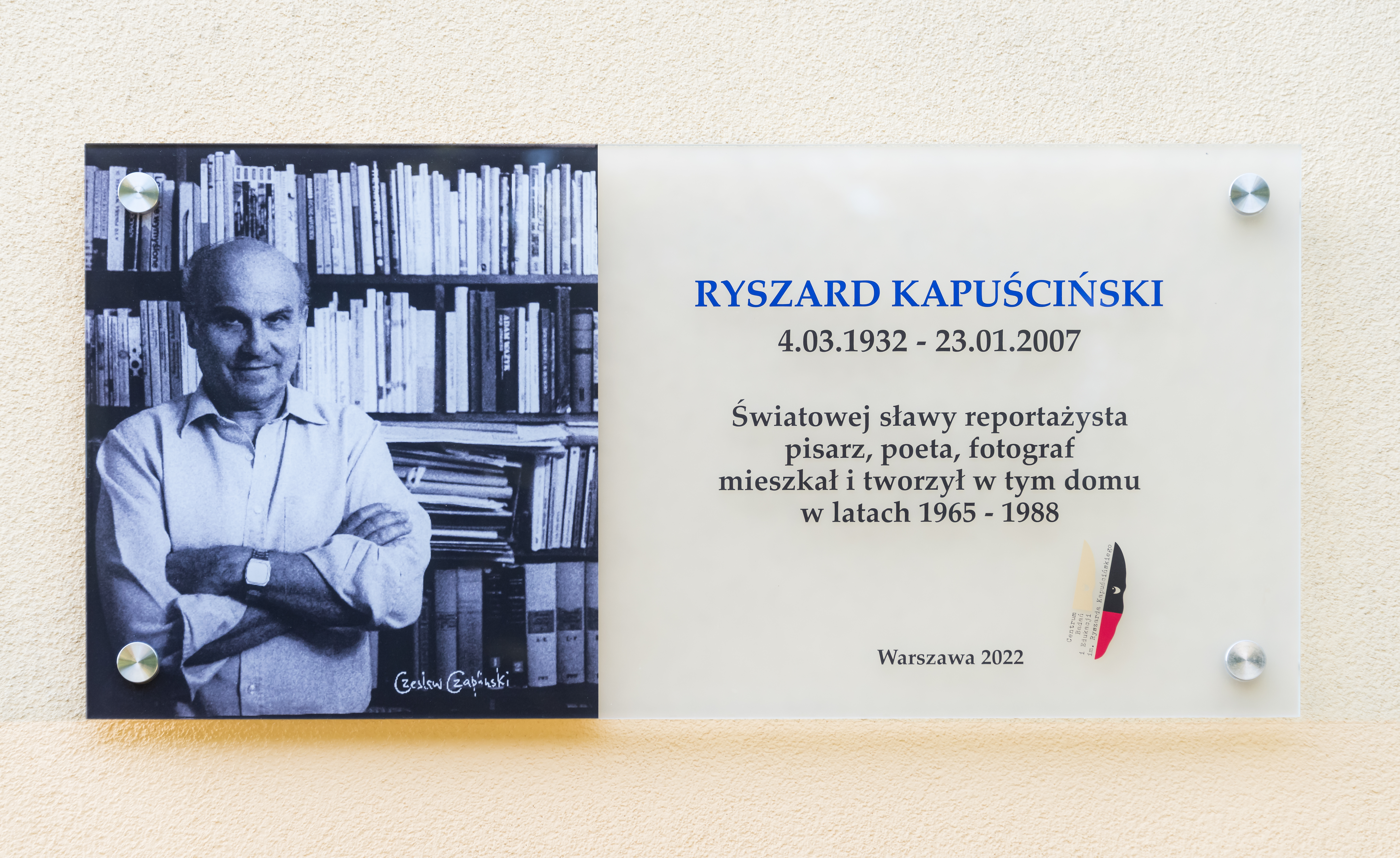
Kapuściński commemorative plaque in Warsaw

Reviewing the English translation of Domosławski's book for The Financial Times in 2012, the then permanent secretary of the Nobel-awarding Swedish Academy, Peter Englund, said: "In any case, the "literary" in "literary reportage" doesn't absolve you of your duty to the facts. Neither is it possible, in my mind, to see it as a sliding scale, in which you are able slowly to introduce droplets of fiction into a factual text until, at a certain point, the mixture transforms into pure fiction. No, once an element of fiction is introduced into a text everything immediately turns into fiction – maybe fiction with a strong resemblance to the real world, but still fiction."

The first biographers, Nowacka and Ziątek, responded to Domosławski's allegations with their own new book, Literatura non-fiction. Czytanie Kapuścińskiego po Domosławskim (Non‑fiction literature: Reading Kapuściński after Domosławski) which was published in Polish by the University of Silesia Press in 2013. They oppose the accusation of creating a myth, and his own legend, as well as confabulations and opportunism, showing a selected and tendentious usage of the author's life knowledge, the lack of comprehension of literary reportage, manipulation with texts and quotations, as well as numerous factual and technical mistakes made by Domosławski. In 2013 the publisher of Domosławski's book apologized to Alicja Kapuścińska and her daughter. In May 2015 amendments were ordered by a court in Warsaw which also ruled that Domosławski should apologise to Kapuściński's widow, however in August 2015 the same court has ruled that the author will not have to apologise to Kapuściński's daughter.

== Selected books ==
=== Works available in English ===
- Another Day of Life (Jeszcze dzień życia) (1976)
- The Soccer War (Wojna futbolowa) (1978)
- The Emperor: Downfall of an Autocrat (Cesarz) (1978)
- Shah of Shahs (Szachinszach) (1982)
- Imperium (Imperium) (1993)
- The Shadow of the Sun (Heban) (1998)
- Our Responsibilities in a Multicultural World (Powinności obywatela świata wielokulturowego) (2002)
- Travels with Herodotus (Podróże z Herodotem) (2007)
- Encountering the Other: The Challenge for the Twenty-first Century—The Inaugural Lecture of the Thirty-six[th] Annual School of Polish Language and Culture at the Jagiellonian University, 5 July 2005 (Spotkanie z Innym jako wyzwanie XXI wieku: wykład z okazji otwarcia 36. Szkoły Języka i Kultury Polskiej Uniwersytetu Jagiellońskiego) (2005)
- Inside an Iceberg (Wewnątrz góry lodowej; extract from The Shadow of the Sun) (2007)
- I Wrote Stone: The Selected Poetry of Ryszard Kapuściński (2007)
- The Cobra's Heart (extract from The Shadow of the Sun) (2007)
- The Other (Ten Inny) (2008) – A collection of the author's lectures.
- My Morning Walk (Spacer poranny) (2009) – The reportage about Poland and Warsaw, written in the 1990s and found after Kapuściński's death. Published in a book which, besides Polish original text, includes translations to English, German and Spanish.
- Collected Poems (Wiersze zebrane) (2012)

=== Works currently unavailable in English ===
- The Polish Bush (Busz po polsku) (1962) – A collection of early essays.
- Black Stars (Czarne gwiazdy) (1963) – A book which focuses on Kwame Nkrumah and Patrice Lumumba.
- The Kirghiz Dismounts (Kirgiz schodzi z konia) (1968) – Essays and articles about seven of the Caucasian and Central Asian republics of the (then) Soviet Union (some of the material subsequently incorporated in Imperium).
- If All Africa... (Gdyby cała Afryka) (1969) – A collection of essays and articles about Africa.
- Why Karl von Spreti Died (Dlaczego zginął Karl von Spreti) (1970) – A book about Guatemala during the 1960s and 1970s, in the background of the assassination of Karl von Spreti.
- Christ With a Rifle on His Shoulder (Chrystus z karabinem na ramieniu) (1975) – A book which focuses on the partisan movements in Africa, Latin America and Middle East. It also chronicles the last execution carried out by El Salvador, that of convicted murderer Victoriano Gómez Urrutia.
- An Invitation to Georgia (Zaproszenie do Gruzji) (1983)
- The Notebook (Notes) (1986) – First collection of the author's poetry.
- Lapidarium (1990)
- Lapidarium II (1995)
- Lapidarium III (1997)
- Lapidarium IV (2000)
- A Cynic wouldn't Suit This Profession: Conversations about Good Journalism (Il cinico non è adatto a questo mestiere: conversazioni sul buon giornalismo) (2000) – Later translated into Spanish and Polish, includes a previously unpublished dialogue with John Berger.
- Lapidarium V (2002)
- A Reporter's Self Portrait (Autoportret reportera) (2003) – A collection of interviews with and quotes by Kapuściński, translated into Hungarian (2004), Spanish (2005), Italian (2006) and French (2008).
- The Journalist's Five Senses: Witnessing, Seeing, Listening, Sharing and Thinking (Los cinco sentidos del periodista (estar, ver, oír, compartir, pensar)) (2003) – distributed for free
- The Laws of Nature (Prawa natury) (2006) – Second collection of the author's poetry
- I Gave a Voice to the Poor: Conversations with the Youth (Ho dato voce ai poveri: dialogo con i giovani) (2007) – A collection of interactions with Italian students.
- Kapuściński: I cannot Encompass the World (Kapuściński: nie ogarniam świata) (2007) – A collection of seven interviews with Kapuściński between 1991 and 2006.
- Lapidarium VI (2007)
- Collected Poetry (Wiersze zebrane) (2008)
- Hospital Diary (Zapiski szpitalne) (2008) – Kapuściński's last writings.
- Writing: Marek Miller talks with Ryszard Kapuściński (Pisanie. Z Ryszardem Kapuścińskim rozmawia Marek Miller), Warsaw, Czytelnik, 2012 (book + DVD) – conversations with Kapuściński on the art of reportage, recorded in the 1980s.

=== Magazine contributions in English (by issue) ===
- Granta 15: A Warsaw Diary
- Granta 16: Science
- Granta 20: In Trouble Again
- Granta 21: The Story-Teller
- Granta 26: Travel
- Granta 28: Birthday Special!
- Granta 33: What Went Wrong?
- Granta 48: Africa
- Granta 73: Necessary Journeys
- Granta 88: Mothers
- see also, in book form: Ryszard Kapuściński [et al.], The Best of Granta Reportage, London, Granta, 1993.

=== Photography ===
- Out of Africa (Z Afryki) (2000) – The author's first photo album. Published in Spain as Desde Africa (2001), and in Italy as Dall'Africa (2002).
- Ryszard Kapuściński: Fragment (2002) – Catalogue of the author's photography exhibition held at the Opus Gallery in Wrocław in May 2002.
- From the World (Ze świata) (2008) – A collection of the author's photographs from all over the world, with an introduction by John Updike (text in Polish).
- My Morning Walk (Spacer poranny) (2009) – A collection of the author's photographs from the Mokotów Field in Warsaw (text in English, German and Spanish, as well as Polish).
- Ryszard Kapuściński: From the Imperium (2010) – Catalogue of the author's photography exhibition held at the Zachęta National Gallery of Art in Warsaw, 18 December 2010 – 20 February 2011.
- The Polish Bush: Postscriptum (Busz po polsku. Postscriptum) (2012) – A collection of the author's photographs from the exhibition Konin jak Colorado. These photographs were discovered in 2010.

=== Other ===
- Pracownia Reportażu (Beck et al., inspired by Marek Miller), Who Allowed Journalists Here (Kto tu wpuścił dziennikarzy), Independent Publishing House NOWA, 1985 – 41 conversations with journalists (including Kapuściński) recorded between September 1980 and May 1981 about the Gdańsk Shipyard strikes in 1980.
- Adam Hochschild, Finding the Trapdoor: Essays, Portraits, Travels, Syracuse, N.Y., Syracuse University Press, 1997 ("Magic Journalism," pp. 241–250).
- Anders Bodegård and Maria Söderberg, A Visit to Pinsk with Ryszard Kapuściński, tr. Frank Gabriel Perry, Enskede (Sweden), Maria Söderberg, 1999; ISBN 91-630-7912-7.
- Kazimierz Wolny-Zmorzyński, Wobec świata i mediów. Ryszarda Kapuścińskiego dylematy dziennikarskie, literackie, społeczno-polityczne, Kraków, Instytut Dziennikarstwa Uniwersytetu Jagiellońskiego, 1999
- Gdański Areopag – Forum Dialogu (Bock et al.), The Truth (Prawda), Gdańsk – Pelplin, WDP Bernardinum, 2004, ISBN 83-7380-206-1 – Includes conversations with Kapuściński and other interlocutors on the subject of truth, which took place on 9 November 2003 in Gdańsk.
- Krzysztof Masłoń, Love is not Our Lot (Miłość nie jest nam dana), Warsaw, Prószyński i S-ka, 2005 – Includes conversations with Kapuściński and other interlocutors.
- Aleksandra Kunce, The anthropology of points. Deliberations on texts by Ryszard Kapuściński (Antropologia punktów. Rozważania przy tekstach Ryszarda Kapuścińskiego), Katowice, Silesia University Press, 2008
- Maciej Sadowski, Ryszard Kapuściński: Photobiography, Warsaw, VEDA, 2013 – in English and Polish.
- Marek Kusiba, Ryszard Kapuściński from far and near (Ryszard Kapuściński z daleka i z bliska), Warsaw, Znak 2018

== Documentary films ==
Kapuściński wrote a screenplay for a 1962 Polish documentary film 80-dni Lumumby (80 days of Lumumba) directed by Tadeusz Jaworski about Patrice Lumumba. Imperfect Journey is a 1994 Ethiopian documentary film directed by Haile Gerima. Gerima travelled to Ethiopia together with Kapuściński. The film explores the political and psychic recovery of the Ethiopian people after the repression of the military junta of Mengistu Haile Mariam.

Documentary films about Kapuściński include Jacek Talczewski's Ryszard Kapuściński (Polish, 1987, the idea of the film by Marek Miller), Filip Bajon's Poszukiwany Ryszard Kapuściński (Polish, 1998), Piotr Załuski's Druga Arka Noego (Polish, 2000), Pejzaże dzieciństwa. Ryszard Kapuściński (Polish, 2005), Gabrielle Pfeiffer's A Poet on the Front Line: The Reportage of Ryszard Kapuściński (English, 2004), Beata Hyży-Czołpińska's Ostatnia książka Ryszarda Kapuścińskiego (Polish, 2008), Olga Prud'homme-Farges' L'Afrique vue par Ryszard Kapuściński (French, 2014, also in German as Am Puls Afrikas)., and Ela Chrzanowska's Los ríos. El viaje a México con el Maestro Kapuściński (Spanish and Polish, 2016).

== See also ==
- Ryszard Kapuściński Award
- Travel writing
- Foreign correspondent
- Herodotus
- V. S. Naipaul
- Kazimierz Nowak
- Ferdynand Ossendowski
- Tiziano Terzani
- Anjan Sundaram
