= Czytelnik Publishing House =

Polish publishing house

Czytelnik
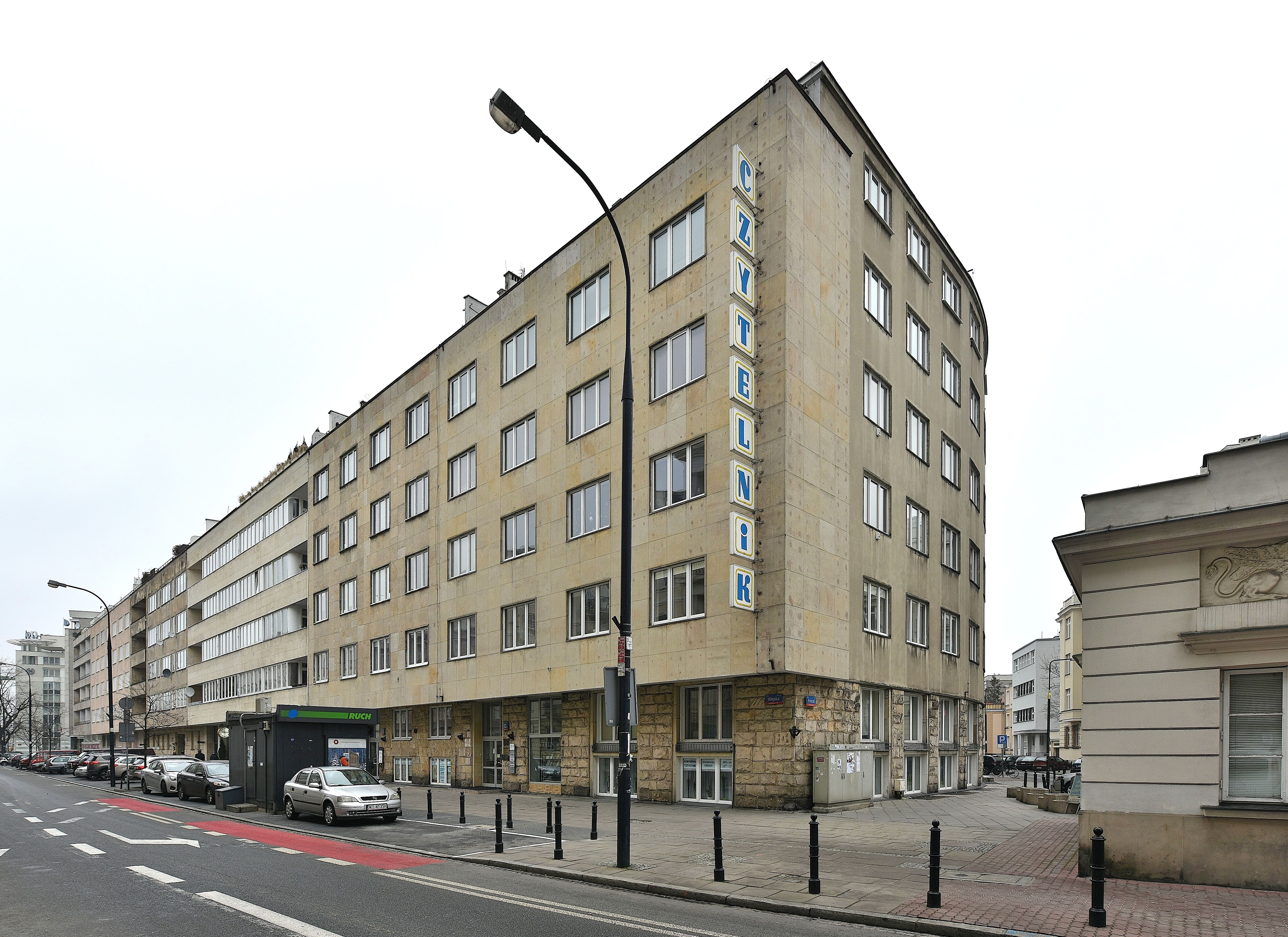
- Czytelnik Publishing House
- Status: Active
- Founded: 1944
- Country of origin: Poland
- Headquarters location: Warsaw
- Official website: www.czytelnik.pl

The Czytelnik Publishing House (Polish: Spółdzielnia Wydawnicza „Czytelnik”) is a publishing company in Poland. It was established in 1944 behind the Soviet front line as the Spółdzielnia Wydawnicza "Czytelnik" ("Czytelnik" Publishing Cooperative). As of now, it is the oldest post–World War II publisher in Poland. The word czytelnik means "reader" in Polish.

Intended to be located in Warsaw after the Nazi German withdrawal, it was temporarily headquartered in Lublin and Łódź. In July 1945 the headquarters were moved to Warsaw. Initially, the Czytelnik published newspapers, periodicals, as well as books. Since 1951 publishing of newspapers and periodicals was transferred to the Workers' Publishing Cooperative "Prasa" ("Press"), which was reorganized and greatly expanded in 1973 as the Prasa-Książka-Ruch ("Press-Book-Movement") monopoly financing the PZPR until the end of Soviet domination.

In 1945–48 the publishing house was under heavy influence of a committed Stalinist Jerzy Borejsza. It was a publishing monopoly in Communist Poland, described by Czesław Miłosz as Borejsza's "personal state-within-a-state for books and press". Borejsza was removed from his role during the ousting of Władysław Gomułka in 1948, part of the Soviet-led campaign against the so-called "right-wing and nationalist deviation" in Polish Workers' Party.

== Presidents ==
- 1944: Jerzy Borejsza
- 1948: Jerzy Pański
- 1952: Jan Stefczyk
- 1955: Ludwik Kasiński
- 1975: Stanisław Bębenek
- 1989: Wacław Sadkowski
- 1990: Jerzy S. Sito
- 1991: Stefan Bratkowski
- 1992: Marek Bogucki
- 1994: Włodzimierz Michalak
- 1995: Marek Żakowski

== Book series ==
- Archiwum Kultury (English, "Culture Archive")
- Biblioteka Dwudziestolecia (English, "Library of the Interwar Period")
- Biblioteka Expressu Wieczornego (English, "Library of the Evening Express")
- Biblioteka Gazety Poznanskiej (English, "Library of Poznan Newspapers")
- Biblioteka Literatury Faktu XXX-lecia (English, "30th Anniversary of Fact Literature Library")
- Biblioteka Naukowa Mlodego Czytelnika (English, "Scientific Library of the Young Reader")
- Biblioteka Popularnonaukowa "Mathesis Polskiej" (English, "'Polish Knowledge' Popular Science Library")
- Biblioteka Powszechna (English, "Public Library")
- Biblioteka Romansow i Powiesci (English, "Library of Romance and Novels")
- Biblioteka Satyry (English, "Library of Satire")
- Biblioteka Szpilek (English, "Pins Library")
- Biblioteka Trybuny Wolnosci (English, "Library of Freedom Tribune")
- Biblioteka Uniwersytetow Robotniczych (English, "Library of Workers' Universities")
- Dom i Swiat (English, "Home and World")
- Klasycy Literatury XX Wieku (English, "Classics of 20th Century Literature")
- Kolekcja Polskiej Literatury Wspolczesnej (English, "Collection of Polish Contemporary Literature")
- Ksiazka Nowego Czytelnika (English, "New Reader's Book")
- Klub Dobrej Ksiazki (KDK) (English, "Good Book Club")
- Mala Biblioteczka Towarzystwa Wiedzy Powszechnej (English, "Little Library of Universal Knowledge")
- Maly Album Malarstwa Polskiego (English, "The Small Album of Polish Painting")
- Muzyczna Biblioteka Pedagogiczna (English, "Pedagogical Music Library")
- Nike (English translation (from Greek): "Victory")
- Nowy Sympozjon (English, "New Symposium")
- Oni Zmienili Swiat (English, "They Changed the World")
- Pamietniki kobiet (English, "Women's Diaries")
- Panorama (English, "Panorama")
- Pejzaże Kultury (English, "Cultural Landscapes")
- Piosenki Czytelnika (English, "Reader Songs")
- Poeci Polscy (English, "Polish Poets")
- Polska Krytyka Literacka (English, "Polish Literary Criticism")
- Prace Polskiego Instytutu Socjologicznego Studium Problemow Chlopskich i Robotniczych (English, "Works of the Polish Sociological Institute of the Study of Peasants' and Workers' Problems")
- Prace Slasko-Dabrowskiego Towarzystwa Przyjaciol Nauk (English, "Works of the Silesian-Dabrowski Society of Friends of Sciences")
- Seria z Faunem (English, "Series with Faun")
- Seria z Jamnikiem (English, "Series with a Dachshund")
- Studia z Dziejow Mysli i Ruchu Demokratycznego (English, "Studies from the History of Thought and the Democratic Movement")
- Symposion
- U Podstaw Wiedzy (English, "Basic Knowledge")
- Wiedza Powszechna (English, "Common Knowledge")
- Wielka wojna bialych ludzi (English, "Great War of the White People") – Polish translations of World War I novels by Arnold Zweig
- Wielkie Problemy Dziejow Czlowieka (English, "Great Problems of Human History")
- Wzorowy Zawodowiec (English, "Exemplary Professional")
- Z Kosmonauta (English, "From the Cosmonaut")
- Z Prac Instytutu Badan Literackich Polskiej Akademii Nauk (English, "From the works of the Institute of Literary Research of the Polish Academy of Sciences")
- Z Prac Instytutu Sztuki Polskiej Akademii Nauk (English, "From the works of the Institute of Art of the Polish Academy of Sciences")
