= Empire (disambiguation) =

An empire is a group of states or peoples under centralized rule.

Empire may also refer to:

== Buildings ==
- Empire (skyscraper), formerly the Imperia Tower, a complex in Moscow, Russia
- Empire, Colombo, a residential complex in Sri Lanka
- Empire State Building, a skyscraper in New York City

== Places in the United States ==
- Empire, Alabama, an unincorporated community in Walker County, Alabama
- Empire, California, in Stanislaus County
- Empire, Colorado
- Empire, Georgia
- Empire, Kentucky
- Empire, Louisiana
- Empire, Michigan
- Empire, Minnesota
- Empire, Missouri
- Empire, Nevada
  - Empire, Ormsby County, Nevada
- Empire, Ohio
- Empire, Oregon
- Empire, Wisconsin
- Empire, Wyoming

== Arts, entertainment, and media ==
=== Comics and graphic novels ===
- Empire (comics), a 2000 DC Comics miniseries
- Empire (graphic novel), by Samuel R. Delany and Howard Chaykin
- Empyre, a 2020 Marvel Comics miniseries

=== Films ===
- Empire (1965 film), by Andy Warhol
- Empire (1986 film), by Alexander Sokurov
- Empire (2002 film), starring John Leguizamo
- Empire (2023 film), by Frederikke Aspöck
- The Empire (film), by Bruno Dumont
- The Empire Strikes Back, 1980, referred to as "Empire" by the Star Wars community

=== Gaming ===
==== Computer and video games ====
- Empire (1972 video game), a 1972 4X wargame
- Empire (1977 video game), a 1977–2004 series of turn-based strategy games invented by Walter Bright
  - Empire: Wargame of the Century, video game developed by Walter Bright and published by Interstel Corporation in 1987
- Empire (PLATO), a 1973 space battle game for the PLATO system
- Empire, a 1980s strategy game for the BBC Micro
- Empire, or Empire: Alpha Complex, the working titles for the Xbox Live Arcade game Shadow Complex
- Empire!, a 1986 space trading and combat video game
- Empire: Total War, a 2009 strategy computer game
- Empires: Dawn of the Modern World, a 2003 computer game in the Empire Earth series
- The Empire, a video game trilogy (I: World Builders, II: Interstellar Sharks, III: Armageddon), developed by David Mullich

==== Other games ====
- Empire LRP, a large UK fest game run by Profound Decisions
- The Empire (Warhammer)

=== Literature ===
- Empire (Card novel), 2006, by Orson Scott Card
- Empire (Hardt and Negri book), a 2000 book about imperialism by Michael Hardt and Antonio Negri
- Empire (H. Beam Piper book), 1981 short story collection by H. Beam Piper
- Empire (Saylor novel), by Steven Saylor
- Empire (Vidal novel), a 1987 Narratives of Empire novel by Gore Vidal
- Empire (graphic novel), 1978, by Samuel R. Delany
- Empire, a The Legend of Sigmar book by Graham McNeill
- Empire, a Galaxy Science Fiction Novel by Clifford D. Simak
- Empire: How Britain Made the Modern World, a book by Niall Ferguson
- Empire: What Ruling the World Did to the British, a book by Jeremy Paxman
- Empire Trilogy, a fantasy series by Raymond E. Feist and Janny Wurts
- Galactic Empire series, a sci-fi series by Isaac Asimov
- The Empire (play), by DC Moore

=== Music ===
==== Groups ====
- Empire (band), a British-German metal band
- Empire (English band)
- Empire (Japanese group), a Japanese idol group
- Empire! Empire! (I Was a Lonely Estate), an emo group
- Empires (band), an American rock group

==== Albums ====
- Empire (Circle album), 2004, or the title song
- Empire (Scott Colley album), 2010
- Empire (Frankie DeCarlos album), 2011
- Empire (EP), by The Word Alive, 2009
- Empire (Kasabian album), 2006
- Empire (Madball album), 2010, or the title song
- Empire (Derek Minor album), 2015, by American artist Derek Minor
- Empire (Queensrÿche album), 1990
- Empire (Super8 & Tab album), 2010
- Empire, from the Hood to Hollywood, 2015, by American rapper Master P
- Empires (Animosity album), 2005, or the title song
- Empires (Hillsong United album), 2015, or the title song
- Empires (Jimi Jamison album), 1999
- Empires (VNV Nation album), 1999
- The Empire (album), by Vader, 2016

==== Songs ====
- "Empire" (Kasabian song), 2006
- "Empire" (Queensrÿche song), 1990
- "Empire" (Shakira song), 2014
- "Empire", by Asking Alexandria on Asking Alexandria
- "Empire", by August Burns Red on Leveler
- "Empire", by Bomb the Bass
- "Empire", by BoySetsFire on The Misery Index: Notes from the Plague Years
- "Empire (Let Them Sing)", by Bring Me the Horizon on Sempiternal
- "Empire", by David Byrne on Grown Backwards
- "Empire", by Chimaira on Resurrection
- "Empire", by Fear Factory on Transgression
- "Empire", by Ella Henderson on Chapter One
- "Empire", by Hybrid on Disappear Here
- "Empire", by In Strict Confidence on Face the Fear
- "Empire", by Mac on Shell Shocked
- "Empire", by Machinae Supremacy on Redeemer
- "Empire", by Of Monsters and Men on Beneath the Skin
- "Empire", by Pete Philly and Perquisite on Mystery Repeats
- "Empire", by Serenity on Lionheart
- "Empire", by Superheist on Identical Remote Controlled Reactions
- "Empire", by The Black Angels on Passover
- "Empire", by Trampled by Turtles on Duluth
- "Empire", by Dar Williams on My Better Self
- "Empires", by 10 Years on The Autumn Effect
- "Empires", by Chicane on Easy to Assemble
- "Empires", by the Smashing Pumpkins on Atum: A Rock Opera in Three Acts
- "Empires", by Snog
- "Empires", by Trenches on Reckoner
- "Empires (Bring Me Men)", 2002, by Lamya on Learning from Falling
- "Empires" (Alicja Szemplińska song), the Polish entry for the Eurovision Song Contest 2020
- "The Empire", by Myrath on Karma

=== Periodicals ===
- Empire (magazine), a British film magazine
- Empire (newspaper), an Australian newspaper
- Empire News, an 1884–1960 British newspaper

=== Television ===
- Empire (1962 TV series), a Western series
- Empire (1984 TV series), a sitcom
- Empire (2005 TV series), a historical drama series
- Empire (2006 TV series), a current-events series
- Empire (2012 TV series), a documentary series
- Empire (2015 TV series), a music industry drama series
- Empire with David Olusoga, a 2025 documentary series co-produced by the BBC and the Open University
- "Empire" (Big Love), an episode of the American TV series Big Love
- "Empire" (Law & Order), a 1999 episode of the police/legal drama series
- The Empire (Indian TV series), a 2021 historical drama centered on the Mughal Empire
- The Empire (South Korean TV series), a 2022 drama series
- "Empire", a Series E episode of the television series QI (2007)

=== Other uses in arts, entertainment, and media ===
- Empire (show), a contemporary circus show that debuted in New York City
- Galactic Empire (Star Wars), a fictional autocracy in the Star Wars franchise
- Empire (podcast), a British podcast

== Brands and enterprises ==
=== Airlines ===
- Empire Airlines (1976–1985), a defunct American airline
- Empire Airlines, an American airline
- Empire Air Lines, an American airline that operated in the 1940s

=== Motor vehicles ===
- Empire (1901 automobile), an American automobile manufactured 1901–1902
- Empire (1910 automobile), an American automobile manufactured 1910–1919
- Dial EV Empire, a Chinese automobile

=== Other brands and enterprises ===
- Empire Company, a Canadian holding company
  - Empire Theatres, the second-largest movie theatre chain in Canada and a subsidiary of the above company
- Empire Distribution, an American distribution company and record label
- Empire Interactive, a video game publisher
- Empire Records (disambiguation), any of several record labels
- Empire Theatre (41st Street), a Broadway theatre that was prominent in the first half of the twentieth century
- Empire Today, an American home furnishing company, well known for its Empire TV advert jingle
- Moss Empires music hall theatres, and now cinemas as well, originally including:
  - O2 Shepherd's Bush Empire
  - Empire Cinemas, a British cinema chain, or any of its theatres
    - Empire, Leicester Square, a central London cinema owned by Empire Cinemas
  - Hackney Empire, London
  - Liverpool Empire Theatre, Liverpool, England

== Plants and animals ==
- Empire (apple), a cultivar of apple
- Empire (biology), a taxonomic rank of organisms

== Transportation ==
- Empire ships, ships prefixed Empire - many ships operated by the British Government
- Short Empire, a pre-WWII flying boat

== Sports ==
- Atlanta Empire, an American women's gridiron football team
- Empire Cricket Club, Barbados
- Empire Games, a sporting festival now known as the Commonwealth Games
- The Empire (professional wrestling), a professional wrestling stable, formed in 2020 in New Japan Pro-Wrestling (NJPW)

== Other uses ==
- Empire (program), a computer software for molecular orbital calculations
- Empire High School, Tucson, Arizona
- Empire silhouette, a style of women's fashion
- Empire style, a design movement
- Project EMPIRE, a design-study for a human mission to Mars

== See also ==
- Emperor (disambiguation)
- Empire City (disambiguation)
- Empire series (disambiguation)
- Empire State (disambiguation)
- Empire Township (disambiguation)
- Inland Empire (disambiguation)
- Imperium (disambiguation)
- New Empire (disambiguation)
