= Empire series =

Empire series may refer to:

- Galactic Empire series or Empire series by Isaac Asimov
- The Empire Duet or Empire series, two novels by Orson Scott Card
- Empire Trilogy, a series of novels by Raymond E. Feist and Janny Wurts
- Empire (2015 TV series)
- Empire (2012 TV series)
- Empire (2005 TV series)
- Empire (1962 TV series)
- Empire ship, a series of ships
- Empire (comics), a comic series
- Star Wars: Empire, a Star Wars comic series
- Empire (1977 video game), a series of commercial games, originally designed by Walter Bright
- Empire (1972 video game), a series of free games, originally designed by Peter Langston

== See also ==
- Empire (disambiguation)
