= Draco (programming language) =

Shareware programming language

- Paradigm: imperative (procedural), structured
- Designed by: Chris Gray
- First appeared: early 1980s, discontinued around 1990
- Typing discipline: static, strong, manifest
- OS: CP/M, Amiga
- License: copyrighted shareware
- Filename extensions: .d .g

Influenced by
- ALGOL 68, Pascal, C

Draco was a shareware programming language created by Chris Gray. First developed for CP/M systems, Amiga version followed in 1987.

Although Draco, a blend of Pascal and C, was well suited for general purpose programming, its uniqueness as a language was its main weak point. Gray used Draco for the Amiga to create a port of Peter Langston's game Empire.

== Examples ==
Hello world:

proc main()void:
    writeln("Hello world");
corp;
