= Imperium (disambiguation) =

Imperium refers to a legal concept of authority in Roman antiquity

Imperium may also refer to:

- the authority of an imperator, as a special class of official in the Roman Republic
- during the Roman Empire, the authority of the Roman emperors
- Imperium Romanum, the Roman Empire
- Imperium Romanum Sacrum, the Holy Roman Empire
- any Empire

== Film and television ==
- Imperium (film series), TV movie series on the Julio-Claudian Dynasty
- Imperium (TV series), 2012 Spanish TV series
- Imperium (2016 film), film starring Daniel Radcliffe as an undercover FBI agent
- Imperium (2026 film), a 2026 documentary

== Games ==
- Imperium (board game), a 1977 science fiction board wargame
- Imperium (Warhammer 40,000), a galactic empire in the fictional Warhammer 40,000 universe
- Imperium (Traveller), a galactic empire in the fictional Traveller role-playing game universe
- Imperium (1990 video game), developed by Electronic Arts for the Amiga, Atari ST and DOS
- Imperium (1992 video game), developed by Vic Tokai for the Super NES/Super Famicom system
- Dune: Imperium, a 2020 science fiction board game

== Literature ==
- Imperium (Harris novel), a 2006 novel by Robert Harris
  - Imperium (play cycle), 2017 theatre adaptation of the novel and its two sequels
- Imperium (Kapuściński book), a 1993 book by Ryszard Kapuściński
- Imperium (Kracht novel), a 2012 novel by Christian Kracht
- Imperium: The Philosophy of History and Politics, a 1948 book by Francis Parker Yockey (using the pen name Ulick Varange)
- The Imperium, a fictional race in the novel Worlds of the Imperium by Keith Laumer

== Music ==
- Imperium (Current 93 album)
- Imperium (Blouse album), 2013
- Imperium (Hunter album), 2013
- "Imperium" (Madeon song), 2014
- "Imperium" (Machine Head song)

== Other uses ==
- Imperium, play by the Austrian writer and director Götz Spielmann
- Imperium (professional wrestling), a professional wrestling stable in WWE

== See also ==
- Empire (disambiguation)
