= Wander (1974 video game) =

1974 text adventure

- Designer: Peter Langston
- Platform: Mainframe
- Release: 1974
- Genre: Interactive fiction
- Mode: Single-player

Wander is a text adventure written by Peter Langston in 1974. It is one of the earliest text adventure video games in existence, predating Colossal Cave Adventure. The game was originally coded in BASIC on a mainframe computer with multiple databases to create the worlds that formed the game. It was distributed in Langston's PSL Games collection for Unix.

For a long time, the original files had been kept in an archived email by one of Langston's friends. The files now exist on GitHub.

== Gameplay ==
Wander is both a text adventure game and a tool for creating interactive fiction; it describes itself as "a tool for writing non-deterministic fantasy stories". The game comes with one such story, named "a3", along with instructions for authors to write their own stories that the game can parse. The game is entirely text based, with the player entering commands such as "north" or "kick machine" in order to progress. The player also has an inventory, which stores objects that they have collected in a game for use.

== Plot ==
In the story included with the game, the player takes the role of First Under-secretary to the Ambassador for the Corps Diplomatique Terrestrienne (CDT). Sent by Mr. Magnan to the mysterious country Aldebaran III, the player's mission is to prevent an uprising against Terran nationals in a limited time.

== Development ==
Wander was created in 1973 or 1974 by Peter Langston. It was initially created by Langston in HP BASIC at Evergreen State College where Langston was teaching computer science and audio engineering. He likely developed Wander on an HP2000 minicomputer like his 1972 game Empire. Langston rewrote the game in C in 1974 while at Harvard University and released it to other users of the mainframe system. He maintained the early mainframe game through the rest of the decade, with a release in 1980 as part of his PSL Games Collection package of games for Unix. The game was thought lost since, as the mainframe computers it ran on were discontinued and no backup copies were known, but in 2015 an interactive fiction enthusiast named "ant", upon seeing the game on a list of lost mainframe games, contacted Langston, who found a copy of the 1980 version in a friend's email archives. The 1980 source code has since been uploaded to GitHub, with adjustments made by Langston and others to make it run on non-unix systems.
