= Imperial City =

Imperial city was a medieval class of cities that were directly subject only to the Holy Roman Emperor.

Imperial City may also refer to:

- Imperial City, Beijing, a section of the city of Beijing in the Ming and Qing dynasties
- Imperial City of Huế, former capital of Vietnam
- Toledo, Spain, nicknamed "The Imperial City"
- Sarnia, Canada, also nicknamed "The Imperial City"
- Petrópolis, Brazil, also nicknamed "The Imperial City"

== See also ==
- Empire City, disambiguation
- Imperial, California, United States, a city
- Imperial Capital (disambiguation)
- Vatican City
