= L'Empire =

L'Empire may refer to:

- French colonial empire
- L'Empire, working title of Hors Satan
- The Empire (film), 2024 film by Bruno Dumont
- Théâtre de l'Empire, former theatre in Paris

== See also ==
- Empire (disambiguation)
