= Inland =

Inland may refer to:

== Places ==
=== Sweden ===
- Inland Fräkne Hundred, a hundred of Bohuslän in Sweden
- Inland Northern Hundred, a hundred of Bohuslän in Sweden
- Inland Southern Hundred, a hundred of Bohuslän in Sweden
- Inland Torpe Hundred, a hundred of Bohuslän in Sweden

=== United States ===
- Inland Northwest (United States), also known as the Inland Empire, a region in the U.S. Pacific Northwest
- Inland Township, Cedar County, Iowa, USA
- Inland Township, Michigan, USA
- Inland, Nebraska, USA
- Inland Township, Clay County, Nebraska, USA

== Arts, entertainment, and media ==
=== Literature ===
- Inland (Murnane novel), a 1988 novel by Gerald Murnane
- Inland (Obreht novel), a 2019 novel by Téa Obreht
- The Inland, an underprivileged Brazilian community in 3%

=== Film ===
- Inland (2022 film), a film by Fridtjof Ryder

=== Music ===
- Inland (Jars of Clay album), 2013, or the title song
- Inland (Mark Templeton album), 2009

== Other uses ==
- Inland navigation, transport with ships via inland waterway
- Inland Revenue, a former department of the British government
- Inland sea (geology), a shallow sea that covers central areas of continents during periods of high sea level

== See also ==
- Inland Empire (disambiguation)
  - Inland Empire, California, a metropolitan area in the U.S. state of California
