= Empire (Card novel) =

2006 novel by Orson Scott Card

- First edition
- Author: Orson Scott Card
- Cover artist: Bob Warner
- Language: English
- Genre: Speculative fiction
- Publisher: Tor Books
- Publication date: 2006
- Publication place: United States
- Media type: Print (hardcover)
- Pages: 352
- ISBN: 0-7653-1611-0
- OCLC: 71210222
- Dewey Decimal: 813/.54 22
- LC Class: PS3553.A655 E486 2006
- Followed by: Hidden Empire

Empire is a 2006 dystopian novel by American writer Orson Scott Card. It tells the story of a possible Second American Civil War, this time between the right wing and left wing in the near future. It is the first of the two books in the Empire duet, followed by Hidden Empire with the video game Shadow Complex bridging the two.

== Plot ==
The book follows U.S. Army Major Reuben Malich and U.S. Army Captain Bartholomew Coleman, both former Special Forces officers, as America falls into a civil war after the assassinations of both the President and Vice President. A radical leftist army calling itself the Progressive Restoration takes over New York City and declares itself the rightful government of the United States.

The book opens with Major Malich, a captain at the time, leading a Special Forces team in a town of an unnamed Persian-speaking country. They are attacked and return fire, saving a village with only one civilian casualty and earning Captain Malich a promotion to Major.

Major Malich works at the Pentagon, where he writes the plans to find holes in American security but has no idea that they will fall into the wrong hands. The plans call for a stealthy underwater entrance into Washington, D.C., followed by a rocket launcher attack on the White House by relying on an inside informant to give the location of the President. Malich and Coleman come upon the attack in progress and, after acquiring rifles, attempt to prevent the attack. Although they succeed in killing one of the men holding the launchers, the second fires and hits the south wall of the West Wing, which kills the President, Secretary of Defense, and several others. It is later revealed the Vice President had been assassinated by a dump truck backing up into his limousine. Suspicion then turns to Malich, as he had written the plans and was present at the attack.

While Malich is being debriefed at the Pentagon, Coleman is asked to participate in a right-wing coup to correct the existing government. Coleman recounts the meeting on live television and retreats to Malich's side in New Jersey. The next morning they both decide to take a borrowed SUV to Ground Zero. They are caught in an uprising led by high-tech mechs, which fire on anyone wearing a uniform. After rescuing a squad of New York Police officers, they escape on foot via the Holland Tunnel to New Jersey where they collaborate with the National Guard to repel a horde of the mechanized warriors. Two Air Force F-16 jets are shot down into New York Harbor, one hitting the gown of the Statue of Liberty.

Once back in New Jersey, Malich and Coleman join Malich's wife, who used to work for an Idaho congressman who is now, by the order of succession, President. Malich's wife is summoned by the new President. He asks for Malich, Coleman, and Malich's former Special Forces unit to help save the United States. Malich is ordered to retrieve his operations report created at the Pentagon. There, his trusted secretary, DeeNee, betrays him by shooting him in the eye and killing him before his Secret Service escorts could react. Coleman escapes, only to be pursued by more mechanized warriors and hover-bikes. They are eventually repelled by Apache gunships dispatched by the President.

The new National Security Advisor, Averell Torrent, is one of Malich's former professors. He sends a team including Malich's Special Forces operators and Coleman out to discover information about the Restoration group, which was responsible for Malich's death and the subversion of the United States.

Upon finding the Progressive Restoration's lair, the team, led by Coleman, reconnoiter the Washington mountain hideout. They invade the base and take its leader prisoner. After the defeat of the Progressive Restoration, Torrent is elected in a landslide victory as he was the presidential nominee for both the Democratic and Republican Parties. Rather than wait until the next year's inauguration, the current president immediately steps down to let Torrent start his term.

Towards the end of the novel, Malich's wife, Cecily, begins to suspect Torrent's involvement in instigating the entire conflict in order to ascend to power. She discovers many of the key rebel leaders were taught at some point by him. From the notes that Malich left from his classes with him, she uncovers Torrent's obsession with the transition between the Roman Republic and the Empire and Torrent's belief that the United States is in the same stage. The book ends with Cecily and Coleman to whom she reveals her suspicions and wonders whether this is truly the case. No indication is given as to how Torrent will use his power, which sets the novel up for a sequel.

== Setting ==
The leader of the "Progressive Restoration" rebellion movement in the book, Aldo Verus, is often seen as corresponding the real-life liberal financier George Soros.

== Reception ==
The novel's political stance has received both praise and derision. Booklist commended the novel for being "heartfelt and sobering" and expressed approval for "the author's message about the dangers of extreme political polarization and the need to reassert moderation and mutual citizenship." Other critics were less favourable. "Right-wing rhetoric trumps the logic of story and character in this (...) implausibly plotted departure from Card's bestselling science fiction," wrote Publishers Weekly. Library Journal assessed the novel as "entertaining, though not one of Card's best efforts," and expressed reservations about its tendency to "lean heavily to the right" and sound "more like social commentary than fiction". In Locus, Gary K. Wolfe faulted the novel for constructing a world where "insanity is mostly the province of liberalism" and compared the characters and dialogue to "Mattel action figures" and "bumper stickers and political-convention applause lines." He also dismissed its afterword's claim of impartiality as a false centrism.

In addition, the novel has received praise for its action. Booklist characterized it as a "relentless thriller," praising its plot and pacing: "Intriguing plot wrinkles come fore and aft of those basic developments, there are many deftly shaped supporting players, and major shocks explode in a split second (...) Moreover, all the action doesn't obscure the author's message (...); indeed, it drives it home." Entertainment Weekly praised the story as a "blistering read" in which "Card plots hard-boiled action just as well as Tom Clancy, and layers in character detail and dialogue you'll never find in a Jack Ryan novel."

=== Awards ===
The novel was nominated for the Prometheus Award for Best Novel in 2007.

== Adaptations ==
=== Video game ===
Empire is not an original Orson Scott Card project, but rather stems from the development of the Empire video game. The game was being developed by the Mustard brothers, founders of the Chair Entertainment Group development studio until it was canceled. Card was contacted by Donald Mustard and offered the chance to develop the game's storyline as well as a novel to set the series into action. The Xbox Live Arcade Game Shadow Complex was announced by Donald Mustard to be a tie-in to the second installment of Orson Scott Card's Empire Trilogy and is a prequel to the Empire novel that is developed by ChAIR.

=== Film ===
The rights to a film version of Empire have been acquired by Joel Silver and Warner Bros.

== Sequel ==
At the video game convention E3 it was revealed by Donald Mustard of Chair Entertainment that the Xbox Live Arcade game Shadow Complex will serve as a tie-in to the second installment of the Empire trilogy, Hidden Empire, which was released on December 22, 2009. In a developer's diary for the video game Card stated that the game serves as a prequel to the original book. The game takes place a few hours after the vice president is killed and ends within a 24-hour period of its opening. It is also noteworthy that Orson Scott Card was approached by Chair to start the trilogy.

== See also ==
- List of works by Orson Scott Card
- Orson Scott Card
