= Imperial Capital =

Imperial Capital may refer to these imperial capital cities:

- Rome, of the Roman Empire
- Constantinople, as New Rome in the Byzantine Period of Eastern Roman Empire and later in the Ottoman Empire
- Saint Petersburg, of the Russian Empire

== See also ==
- Imperial Capital Bank, a part of City National Bank (California)
- Imperial City (disambiguation)
- Capital city
- Capital (economics)
