= Empire City =

Empire City may refer to:

== Places in the United States ==
- Empire City (California), a historic landmark in Empire, California
- Empire City, Kansas, an unincorporated community
- Empire City, Nevada, a former town site absorbed by Carson City
- Empire City, Oklahoma, a town
- Empire City, Oregon (1853), former county seat of Coos County, Oregon and, since 1965, the Empire district of the city of Coos Bay, Oregon
- Empire City, a nickname for New York City
- Empire City, a nickname for Glen Falls, New York

== Arts, entertainment, and media ==
=== Fictional entities ===
- Empire City (film), an upcoming action-thriller film
- Empire City (comics), a fictional place in the DC Universe
- Empire City, a fictional city that is home to Courageous Cat and Minute Mouse
- Empire City, New Mexico, a fictional city in the video game Gun
- Empire City, the fictional city in which the video game inFAMOUS is set
- Empire City, a fictional city featured in the animated series COPS
- Empire City, a fictional city featured in the animated series Steven Universe
- Empire City, the fictional city setting for Superhero Movie

=== Literature ===
- The Empire City, a 1959 novel by Paul Goodman
- Empire City, a 2020 novel by Matt Gallagher

=== Video games ===
- Empire City, an extra track of the EA game Need For Speed III: Hot Pursuit
- Empire City, a level in the Sonic the Hedgehog game Sonic Unleashed
- Empire City: 1931, a video game by Seibu Kaihatsu

== Other uses ==
- MV Empire City, a British merchantman sunk by U-198 during World War II
- Yonkers Raceway & Empire City Casino, a New York Thoroughbred horse racing facility opened in 1899 that became Yonkers Raceway and expanded to include Empire City Casino

== See also ==
- Empire (disambiguation)
- Empire State (disambiguation)
