= The Beast (2026 film) =

American action film

- Theatrical release poster
- Directed by: Renny Harlin
- Written by: Umair Aleem
- Produced by: Keith Kjarval; Wayne Marc Godfrey; Nicki Cortese; John Logan Pierson; Peter Berg
- Starring: Samuel L. Jackson; Joel Kinnaman; Colin Morgan; Guy Burnet
- Cinematography: Jacques Jouffret
- Edited by: Alex Rodriguez
- Music by: Tuomas Kantelinen
- Production companies: Unified Pictures; Bright White Light; Fifth Season; Film 44; QWGmire
- Distributed by: Aura Entertainment
- Release date: October 9, 2026
- Running time: 99 minutes
- Country: United States
- Language: English

The Beast is a 2026 American action thriller film directed by Renny Harlin and written by Umair Aleem. It stars Samuel L. Jackson, Joel Kinnaman, Colin Morgan, and Guy Burnet.

== Cast ==
- Samuel L. Jackson as Oscar, the President of the United States, codename 'Paladin'
- Joel Kinnaman as Secret Service Special Agent Taft
- Guy Burnet as 'The Professional', the unnamed masked leader of the terrorist group
- Eoin Macken as the voice of Secret Service Command
- LaTanya Richardson Jackson as the voice of Rosa, the First Lady of the United States

== Plot ==
A summit in Madrid is attacked by heavily armed and well organised terrorists. The US President escapes in “The Beast” with Taft, an injured Secret Service agent, but the rest of his detail and Counter Assault Team are killed. Taking control of the car, the President is directed over comms by Secret Service Command to an extraction point whilst Taft treats his injuries. The attackers gun down civilians in the street, and it becomes clear they are aware of all Secret Service contingencies. Command advises that Morón Air Base and Naval Station Rota were also attacked, halting air support, and other attacks are taking place throughout Europe with conflicting and contradictory intel on the perpetrators.

The President activates The Beast’s offensive countermeasures, killing two waves of terrorists. Command updates that the Vice President, UK Prime Minister and Turkish President have been killed. The President reassures Taft that his injuries, similar to ones sustained by a friend in the Vietnam War, are survivable, and how his wife, Rosa, helped him overcome his PTSD. He later performs rudimentary surgery to prevent Taft going into hemorrhagic shock. Command is attacked and communications cease, but the terrorists broadcast a reading of The Second Coming as part of their manifesto. When The Beast is cornered in a tunnel, the President deploys a railgun to clear the way.

Looking Glass assumes communications, advising the President that TACAMO is in place after Offutt AFB was compromised, and he will now be redirected to Marine One to coordinate a nuclear response with remaining world leaders. When Taft dies from his injuries, and Rosa’s hotel in Madrid is obliterated by ordnance, the President’s PTSD relapses. When the Beast is again cornered, he activates the self destruct protocol and resigns himself to death until he speaks with a still-alive Rosa on the radio. The self destruct explosion takes out most of the terrorists, and the President brutally kills the remainder with his long dormant combat skills and disembowels the leader. As the sun rises, he sees Marine One landing in the distance and makes his way to his wife.

== Production ==
In September 2023, it was announced that an action film titled The Beast was being directed by James Madigan and written by Umair Aleem. Samuel L. Jackson and Joel Kinnaman joined the cast, as the United States President and Agent Taft. In August 2024, Guy Burnet joined the cast in an undisclosed role. In November, Renny Harlin had replaced Madigan as the director.

=== Filming ===
Principal photography began in October 2024, in the Canary Islands and Madrid.

== Release ==
Aura Entertainment acquired the distribution rights at the 2026 Cannes Film Festival. The film was released in the United States on October 9, 2026.
