= Imperium (film series) =

Imperium is a British-Italian TV film series about key events and rulers of the history of the Roman Empire. The films were generally broadcast as miniseries.

The films in the series so far are:

- Imperium: Augustus (2003), a film about Caesar Augustus. Starring Peter O'Toole.
- Imperium: Nero (2004) A film about Emperor Nero.
- Imperium: Saint Peter (2005)
- Imperium: Pompeii (2007)
- Imperium: Augustine: the Decline of the Roman Empire (2010)

== See also ==
- Imperium (2016 film), an unrelated British-American film
- Imperium (disambiguation)
