= Hidden Empire =

2009 novel by Orson Scott Card

- First edition
- Author: Orson Scott Card
- Cover artist: Bob Warner
- Language: English
- Series: The Empire duet
- Genre: Science fiction
- Publisher: St Martin's/Tor
- Publication date: December 22, 2009
- Publication place: United States
- Media type: print (hard-cover) and Audio book
- ISBN: 978-0-7653-2004-9
- OCLC: 317928746
- Dewey Decimal: 813/.54 22
- LC Class: PS3553.A655 H54 2009
- Preceded by: Empire

Hidden Empire is a 2009 science fiction novel by American writer Orson Scott Card. It is the second book (out of two) in the Empire duet.

== See also ==
- Empire
- Shadow Complex
- List of works by Orson Scott Card
- Orson Scott Card
- The Mustard brothers
