= United States presidential state car =

Vehicle used by the president of the US

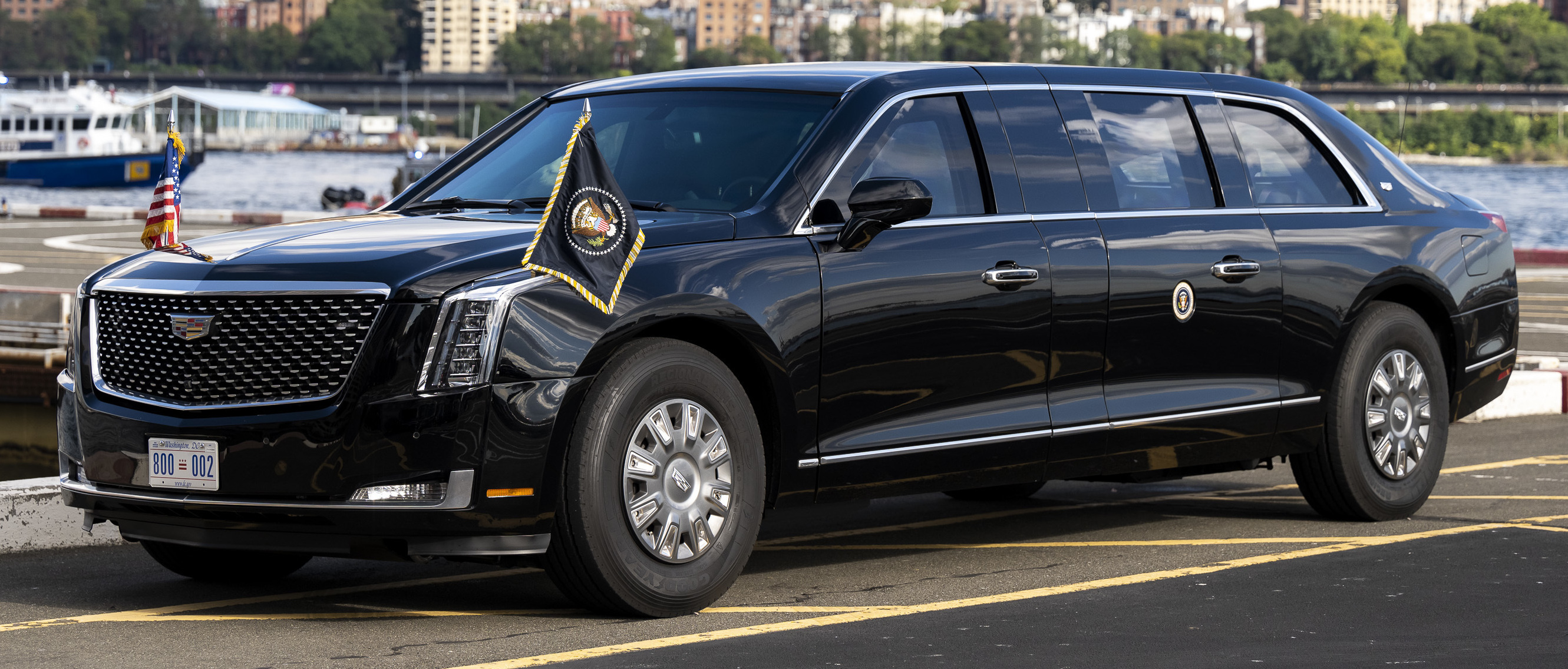
The current Cadillac model of United States presidential state car, which debuted in September 2018

The United States presidential state car (nicknamed "the Beast", "Cadillac One", "First Car"; code named "Stagecoach") is the official state car of the president of the United States.

United States presidents embraced automotive technology in the early 20th century with President William Howard Taft's purchase of four cars and the conversion of the White House stables into a garage. Presidents rode in stock, unmodified cars until President Franklin D. Roosevelt's administration bought the Sunshine Special, the first presidential state car to be built to United States Secret Service standards. Until the assassination of John F. Kennedy, presidential state cars frequently allowed the president to ride uncovered and exposed to the public. President Kennedy's assassination began a progression of increasingly armored and sealed cars; the 2009–2018 state car had five-inch (130 mm) bulletproof glass and was hermetically sealed with its own environmental system. Since 2018 the presidential state car has been a custom-built Cadillac.

Decommissioned presidential state cars are destroyed by the Secret Service for training and to protect their secrets. Late 20th-century and 21st-century presidential motorcades have consisted of 24–45 vehicles other than the presidential state car, including those for security, healthcare, the press, and route-clearing, among others.

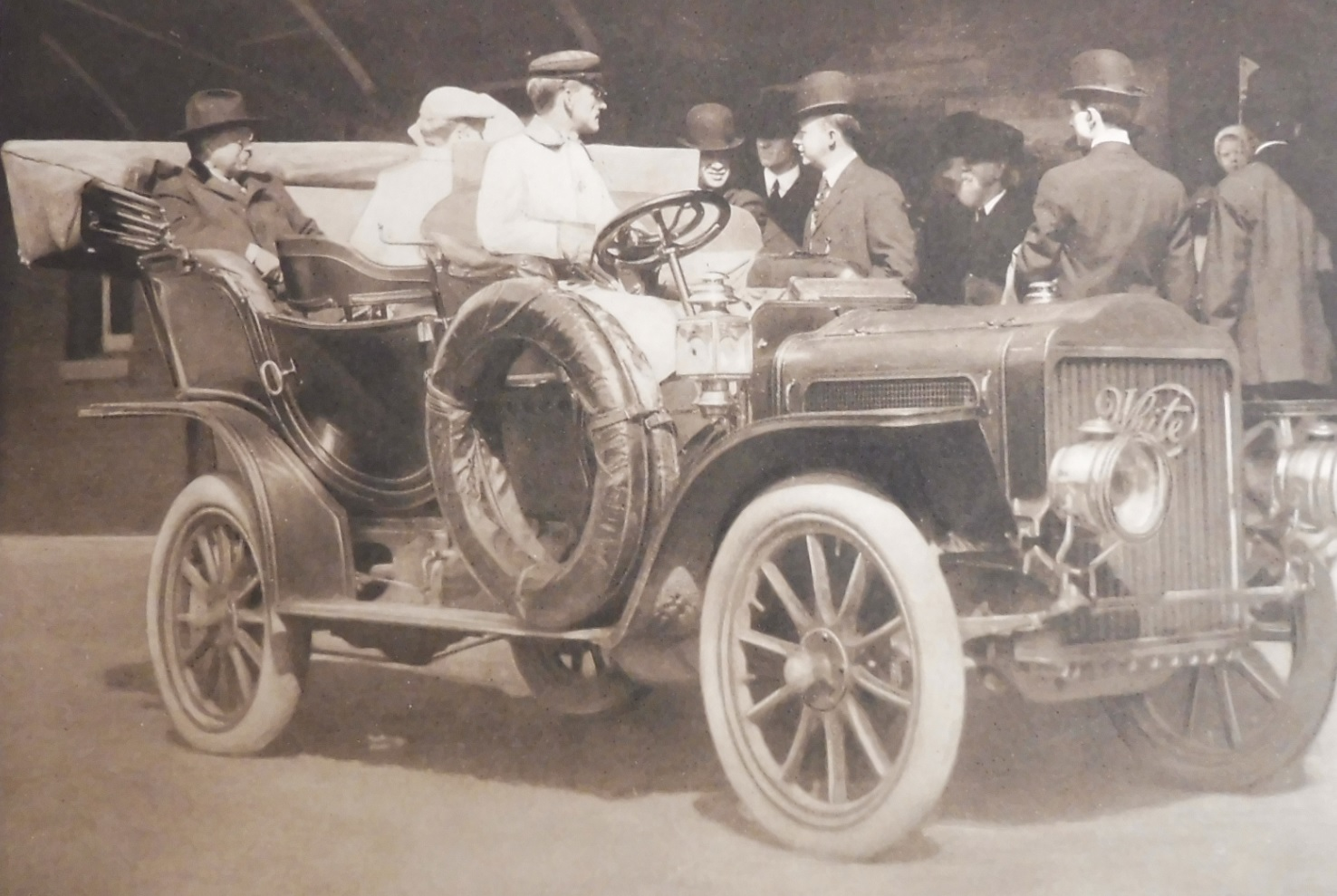
Theodore Roosevelt in a US Government 30 hp White steam car, 1906 (Note: The photograph appears to show Roosevelt accompanying his daughter Alice before her wedding on February 17, 1906)

The first president to ride in a car was President William McKinley, who briefly rode in a Stanley Motor Carriage Company steam car on July 13, 1901. According to the United States Secret Service, it was customary for them to follow the presidential horse-drawn carriage on foot. In 1907 they bought a White Motor Company Model G 30 hp steam car, supposedly so they could follow President Theodore Roosevelt's carriage. Seeking to protect his image as a "rough-riding horseman", Roosevelt usually avoided using it, but sometimes he did (see photograph).

== William H. Taft ==
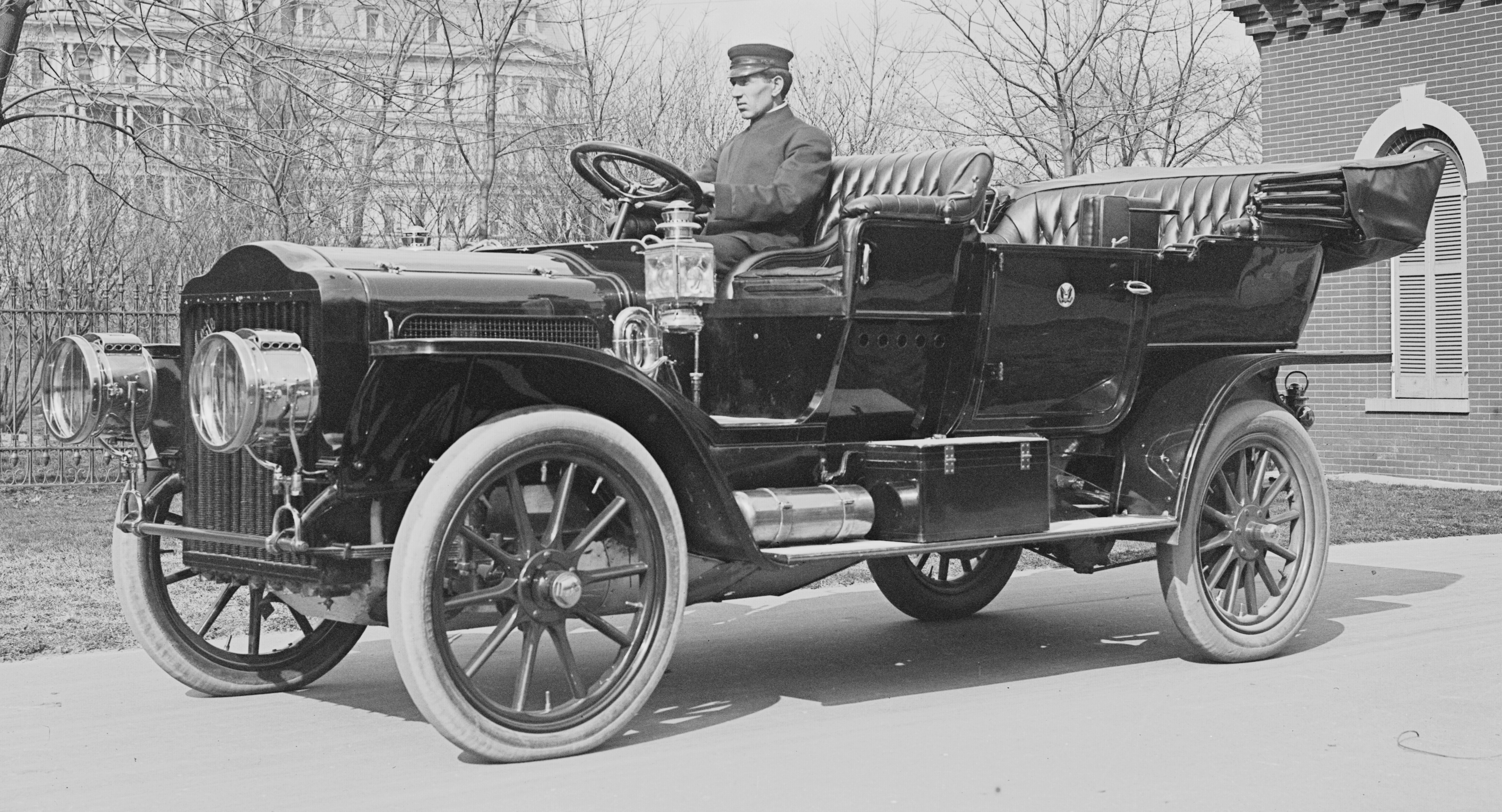
Taft's 1911 White steamer

President William Howard Taft changed things at the White House, converting the stables there to a garage and purchasing a four-car fleet on a budget of $12,000 (equivalent to about $430,000 in 2025): two "luxurious" Pierce-Arrow cars, a Baker Motor Vehicle electric car, and a $4,000 (equivalent to about $143,000 in 2025) 1911 White Motor Company steam car. President Taft became a fan of the steam car when he discovered he could conceal himself from press photographers with a "carefully timed burst of steam."

== Woodrow Wilson ==
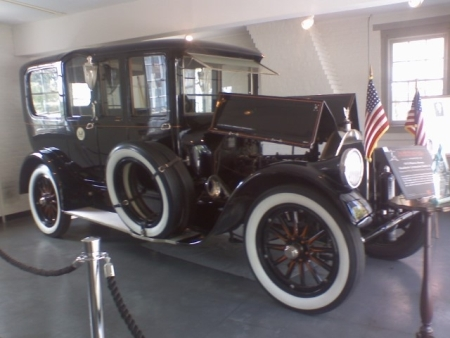
One of three Pierce-Arrow cars purchased by Wilson's administration

During part of his presidency, Woodrow Wilson and his Secret Service detail utilized 1918 model year Milburn Light Electrics as a presidential automobile.

President Woodrow Wilson was such a fan of the three Pierce-Arrow cars purchased by his administration that he bought one of them from the government for US$3,000 (equivalent to $54,151 in 2025) when he left office in 1921. President Warren G. Harding was the first president to use a car to drive to his inauguration, and was the first qualified driver to be elected president. President Herbert Hoover had a Cadillac V-16.

== Franklin Roosevelt ==
In 1936, President Franklin D. Roosevelt bought a Ford V8 Phaeton coupe and had it equipped with hand controls in direct contravention of a Secret Service directive prohibiting sitting presidents from getting behind the wheel of a car.

Sunshine Special
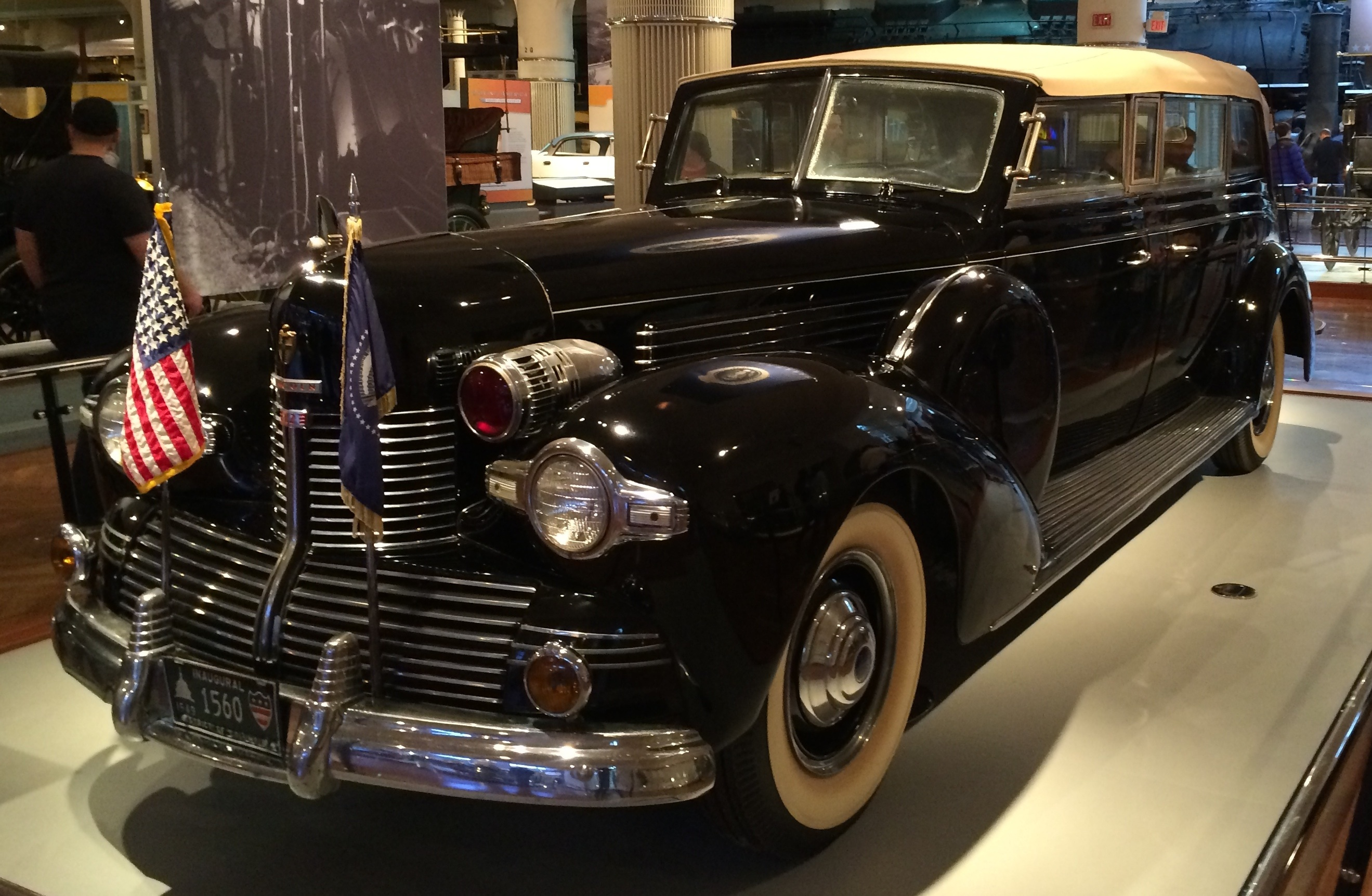
- December 2013 at The Henry Ford

Overview
- Manufacturer: Lincoln Motor Company

Body and chassis
- Class: Limousine
- Platform: Lincoln K-series

Dimensions
- Wheelbase: 160 inches (4,100 mm)
- Curb weight: 9,300 pounds (4,200 kg)

In December 1939, President Roosevelt received a 1939 Lincoln Motor Company V12 convertible—the Sunshine Special. The Sunshine Special (so named because the top was frequently open) became the president's best-known automobile, the very first to be built to Secret Service specifications, and the first to be leased rather than bought. Built on the chassis of the Lincoln K series, the Sunshine Special has a 160-inch (4,100 mm) wheelbase, room for 10 passengers, rear suicide doors, heavy-duty suspension, two side-mounted spare tires, and standing platforms attached to the exterior to accommodate Secret Service agents.

The Sunshine Special underwent two sets of modifications. In 1941 the car's top was lowered three inches (76 mm) out of aesthetic concerns. In 1942, after the attack on Pearl Harbor, the car underwent the addition of armor, one-inch (25 mm) bulletproof glass, "metal-clad flat-proof inner tubes, a radio transceiver, a siren, red warning lights, and a compartment for submachine guns." After the second set of modifications, the car weighed 9,300 pounds (4,200 kg) and was six feet (1.8 m) longer.

== Truman/Eisenhower Lincoln Cosmopolitans ==
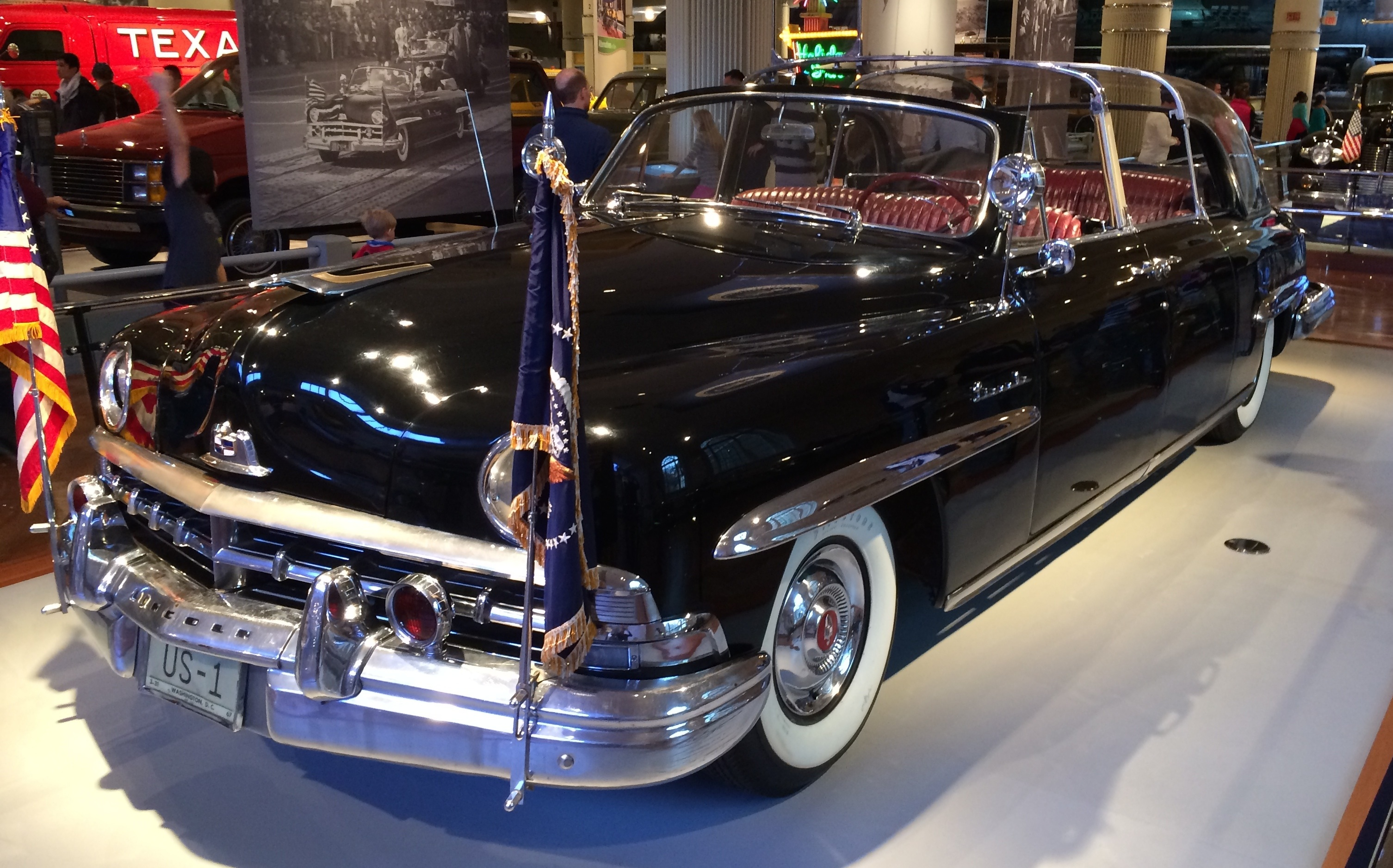
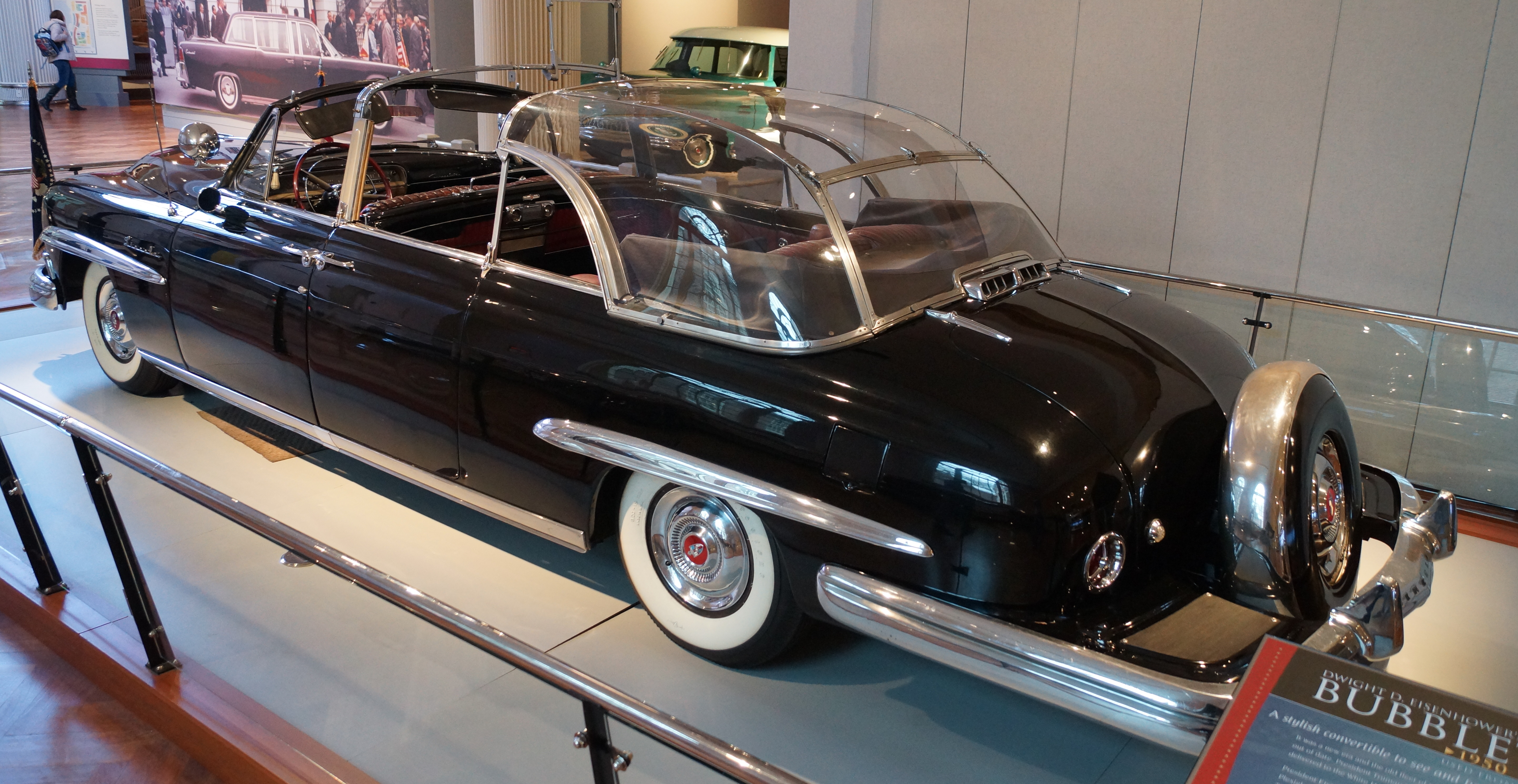
Front and rear views of the "Bubble-top" (2013 & 2016, respectively)

Legend has it that Harry S. Truman held a grudge against General Motors because they would not give him use of their cars during his run for the 1948 presidential election; and, so, in 1950 he chose Lincoln to make the presidential state car. The White House leased ten Lincoln Cosmopolitans. The cars were modified by coachbuilders Henney Motor Company and Hess and Eisenhardt to provide extra security features and extra headroom to accommodate the tall silk hats popular at the time, and were painted black. Nine of the automobiles had enclosed bodies, while the tenth was an armored convertible especially for President Truman. The tenth Cosmopolitan was 20 feet (6.1 m) long, 6.5 feet (2.0 m) wide, and weighed 6,500 pounds (2,900 kg), 1,700 pounds (770 kg) heavier than a stock Cosmopolitan. All ten cars were outfitted with 152-horsepower (113 kW) V8 engines "with heavy-duty automatic transmissions." In 1954, President Dwight D. Eisenhower had the Cosmopolitan convertible fitted with a Plexiglas roof that became known as the "Bubble-top"; it remained in presidential service until 1965, and had approximately 105,942 miles (170,497 km) on the odometer as of May 2008.

== Kennedy Lincoln Continental ==
X-100
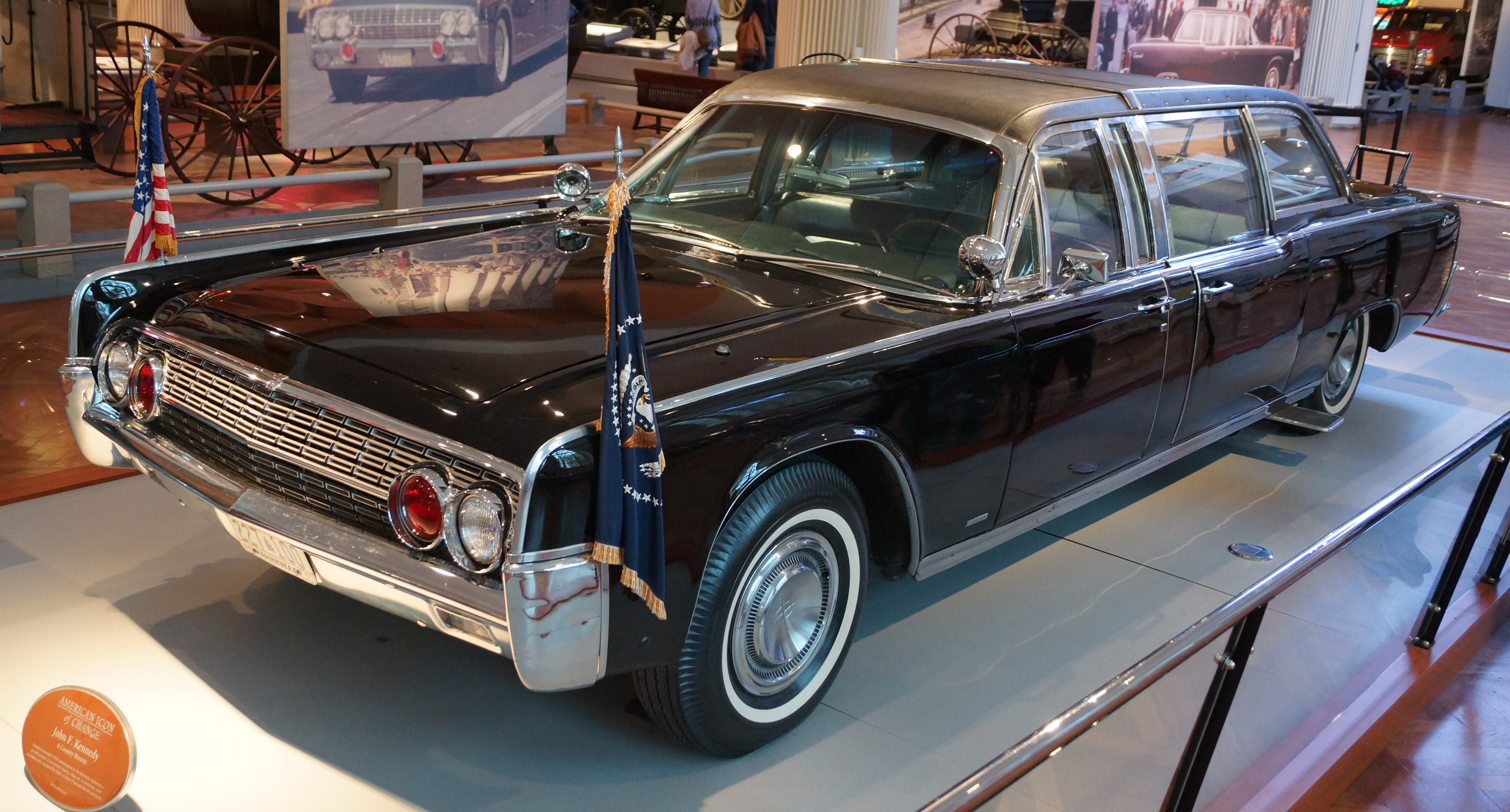
- The X-100 at The Henry Ford in 2016

Overview
- Manufacturer: Lincoln Motor Company

Body and chassis
- Class: Limousine
- Platform: Lincoln Continental

Dimensions
- Curb weight: 9,800 pounds (4,400 kg)

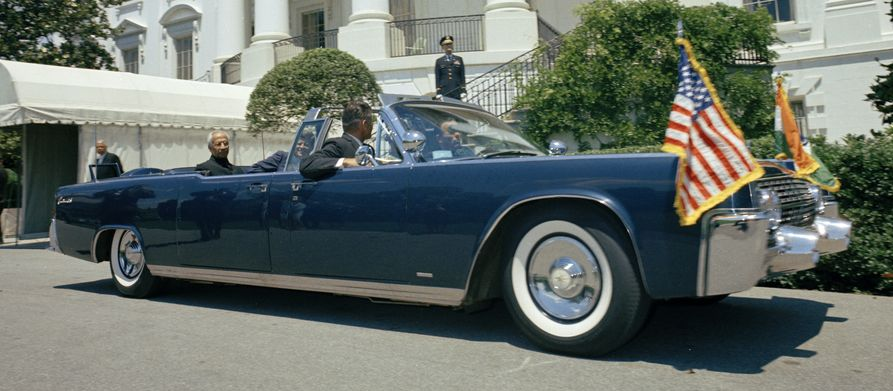
Kennedy's state car in June 1963

President John F. Kennedy's 1961 Lincoln Continental was originally a stock car, built in Wixom, Michigan, and retailing for $7,347 (equivalent to $79,156 in 2025). The federal government leased it from the Ford Motor Company for $500 (equivalent to $5,387 in 2025) annually, and then commissioned Hess and Eisenhardt to modify it for presidential use—with a pricetag of $200,000 (equivalent to $2,154,788 in 2025). The convertible was painted "Presidential Blue Metallic", with silver metal flakes embedded within it; it was given the Secret Service code names of SS-100-X and X-100. Work began on the custom car on March 3, 1961, after four years of planning and discussion between Ford, Hess and Eisenhardt, and the Secret Service. It was delivered to the White House on June 14, 1961, with 2,024 miles (3,257 km) already on its odometer from thorough testing by the Secret Service.

The dark-blue car included a "heavy-duty heater and air conditioner, a pair of radiotelephones, a fire extinguisher, a first-aid kit, and a siren." The stock car was stretched 3.5 feet (1.1 m) to accommodate a foldable center row of forward-facing jump seats. The exterior featured retractable standing platforms and handles for Secret Service agents, and flashing red lights recessed into the bumper. Unique to the X-100 were three removable roofs (made of fabric, lightweight metal, and transparent plastic) and a hydraulic lift that could raise the rear cushion 10 1/2 inches (270 mm) off the floor. Both of these feature sets were designed to make the president more visible to the public, but they also increased the president's vulnerability. Kennedy was assassinated while sitting in the limousine as it drove through Dealey Plaza in Dallas, Texas, on November 22, 1963.

After the assassination, the "Death Car" (as named by the Associated Press), was rebuilt in an operation named "The Quick Fix". Hess and Eisenhardt, the Secret Service, the United States Army Materials and Mechanics Research Center, PPG Industries, and Ford engineers all collaborated to strip the limousine and make substantial improvements. In an effort to prevent "ghoulish collectors" from obtaining discarded car parts, they were destroyed. For an estimated cost of $500,000, the car was painted black; received improved telecommunications gear; its fuel tank was protected against explosion by a "porous foam matrix" that minimized spillage in the event of a puncture; and the passenger compartment was protected by 1,600 pounds (730 kg) of armor. The three removable roofs were replaced by a fixed glass enclosure that cost more than $125,000; the glass enclosure was made of 13 different pieces of bulletproof glass ranging in thickness from 1 to 1 13/16 inches (25 to 46 mm), and was then the largest piece of curved bulletproof glass ever made. Titanium armor was added to the body of the car, the standard windows were made bullet-resistant with sandwiched layers of glass and polycarbonate vinyl, and prototype aluminum run-flat tires were added. To compensate for the 25 percent increase in weight—to 9,800 pounds (4,400 kg)—the upgraded car received a hand-built 350-horsepower (260 kW) V8 engine, providing 17 percent more power.

President Lyndon B. Johnson used the refurbished car for the first time on October 5, 1964, riding with Philippine president Diosdado Macapagal around Washington. In the interim, Johnson had been borrowing one of FBI director J. Edgar Hoover's bulletproof Cadillacs for presidential travel.

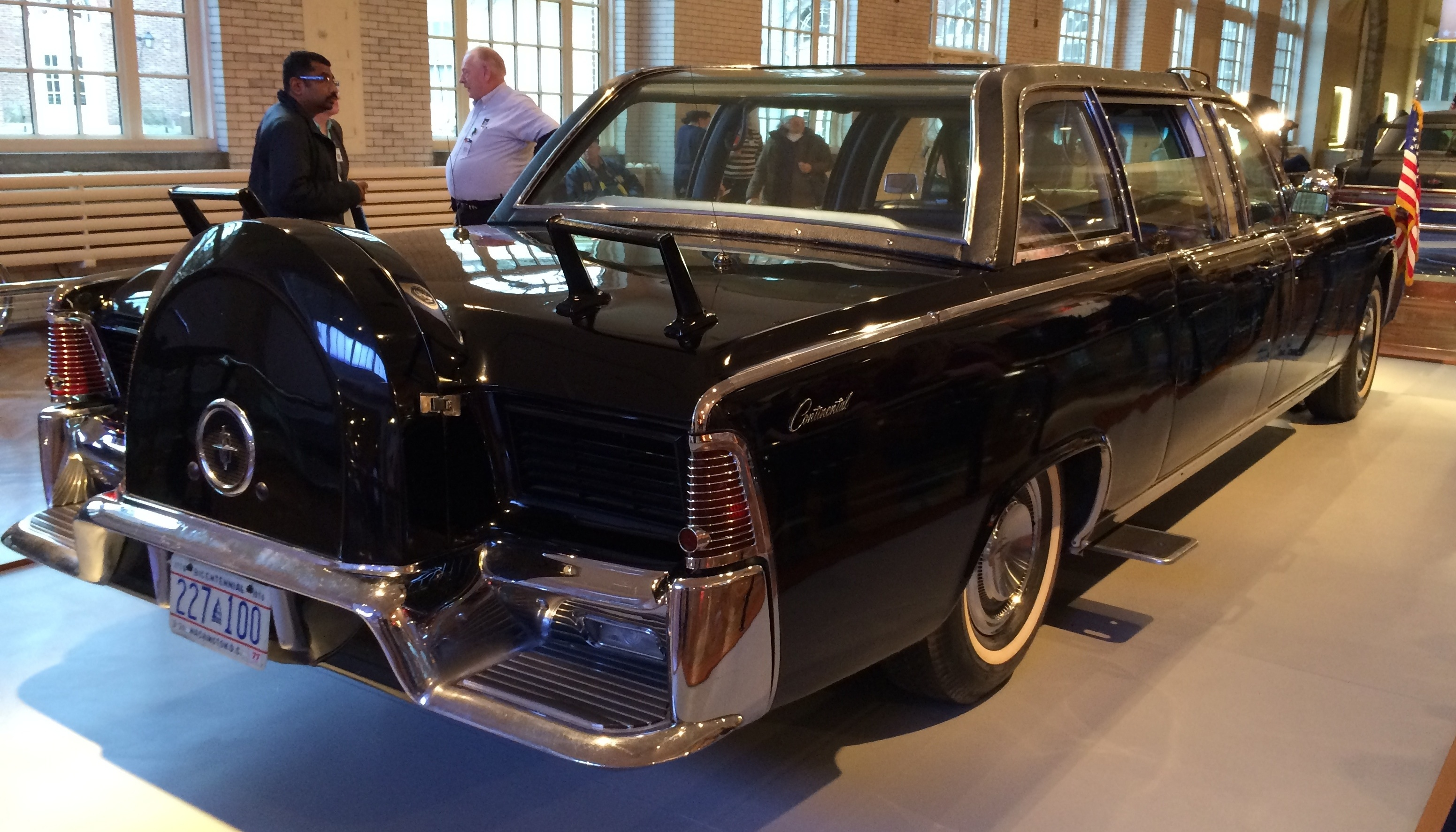
The modified X-100 in 2013

In 1967, the car was modified again with an upgraded air conditioning system, an openable rear-door window, and structural enhancement to the rear deck. Despite successive presidential state cars being built and delivered to the White House, the X-100 continued to be occasionally used by Presidents Lyndon B. Johnson, Richard Nixon, Gerald Ford, and Jimmy Carter until it was retired from service in March 1977. At that time, the federal government donated the car to the Henry Ford museum in Dearborn, Michigan, which also owned the previous presidential Lincolns as well as the chair in which Abraham Lincoln was sitting when he was assassinated at Ford's Theatre. Out of respect for the Kennedy family, the museum stated it would not display the car until Kennedy's children were both 21 or older. The car was kept in storage in a building next to the museum until October 24, 1981, when "The President's Car" exhibit opened to the public (one month before the 21st birthday of John F. Kennedy Jr., Kennedy's youngest surviving child). As of March 2021, it remains on display at the museum.

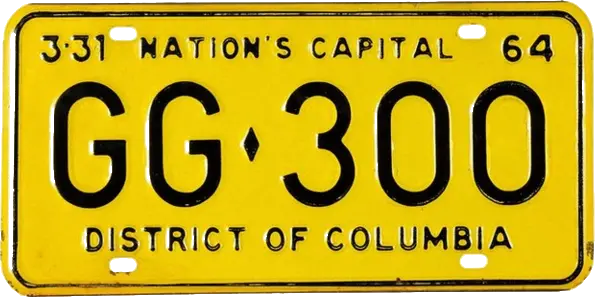
The plates from Kennedy's car

The license plates (DC plates, "GG-300") were removed from the X-100 when the vehicle was upgraded after the Kennedy shooting. When they were auctioned in 2015, they sold for $100,000 (equivalent to $135,828 in 2025).

== 1967 Lincoln Continental ==
President Johnson preferred white convertibles, but "concerns for protocol and safety" had him receiving a black 1967 Lincoln Continental as his state car. The hardtop cost the Ford Motor Company about $500,000 (equivalent to about $4,830,000 in 2025), which leased it to the federal government for an annual cost of $1 (equivalent to $9.66 in 2025). With 4,000 pounds (1,800 kg) of armor, "a bubble top thicker than the protective cockpit of an F-16 fighter", and a 340-horsepower (250 kW) V8 engine, the 11,000-pound (5,000 kg) car could still reach speeds of 100 miles per hour (160 km/h) — or 50 miles per hour (80 km/h) with four flat tires. According to White House spokespeople, President Johnson's car was not equipped with a television, though several of his cabinet members' were. This car also served Presidents Nixon, Ford, and Carter, and traveled to 32 nations before it was retired in the mid-to-late 1970s. In 1996, the Ford Motor Company restored the car to its original state and donated it to the Richard Nixon Presidential Library and Museum in recognition of its use during several of his most-significant presidential trips.

== 1972 Lincoln Continental ==
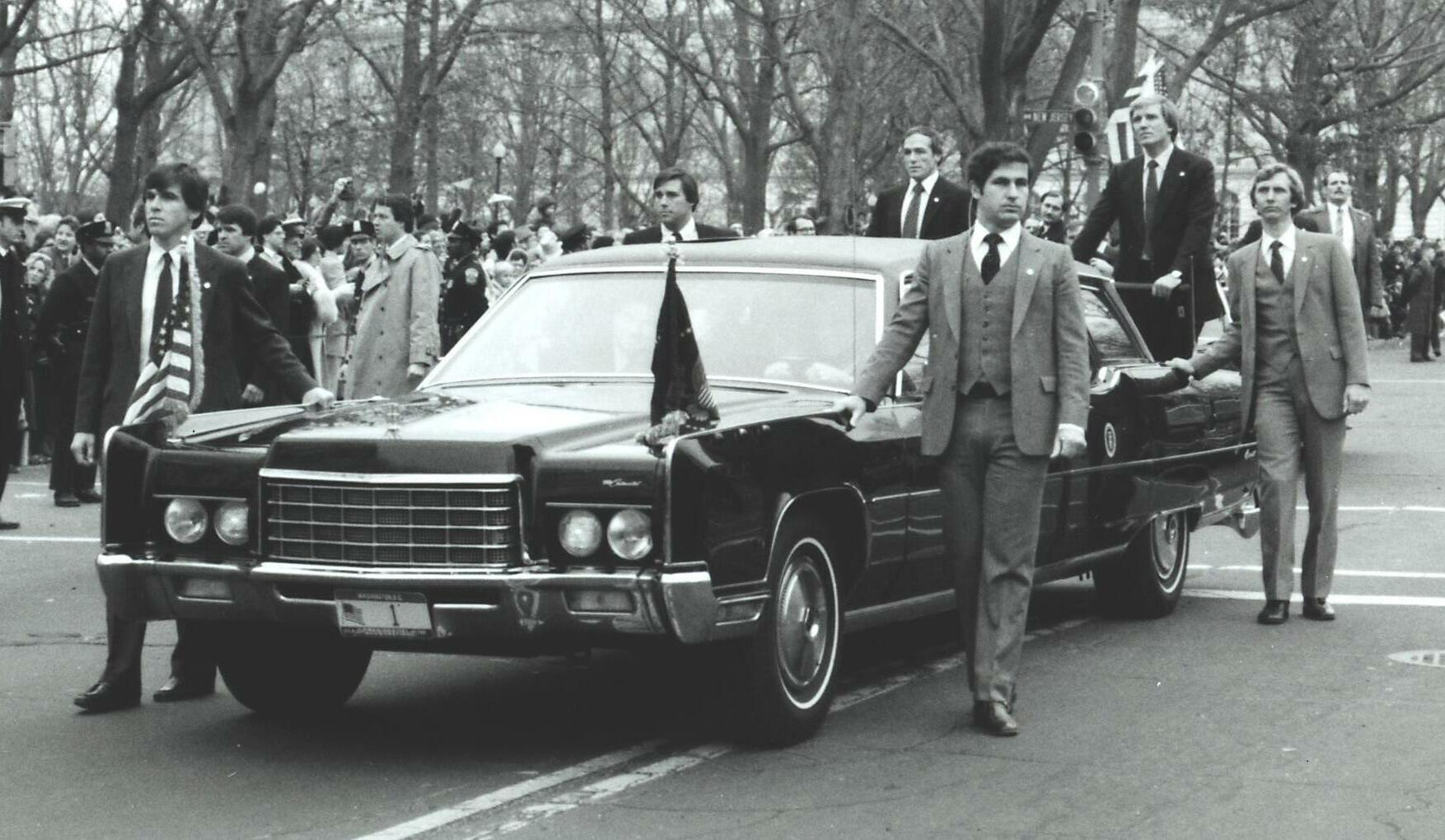
The 1972 Lincoln limousine original appearance

A modified, 22-foot (6.7 m), 13,000-pound (5,900 kg) 1972 Lincoln Continental was delivered to the White House in 1974. A mid-construction photo show the vehicle utilizes heavy duty components including eight lug steel rims and a full floating rear axle; equivalent to what the Ford F250 of the same time period would utilize. The six-passenger limousine was leased from the Ford Motor Company for US$5,000 (equivalent to $32,642 in 2025) per year. The fully loaded automobile had a 460-cubic-inch (7.5 L), 214-horsepower (160 kW) V8 engine; external microphones to allow occupants to hear outside noises; full armor plate; bulletproof glass; and racks for the Secret Service to store submachine guns.

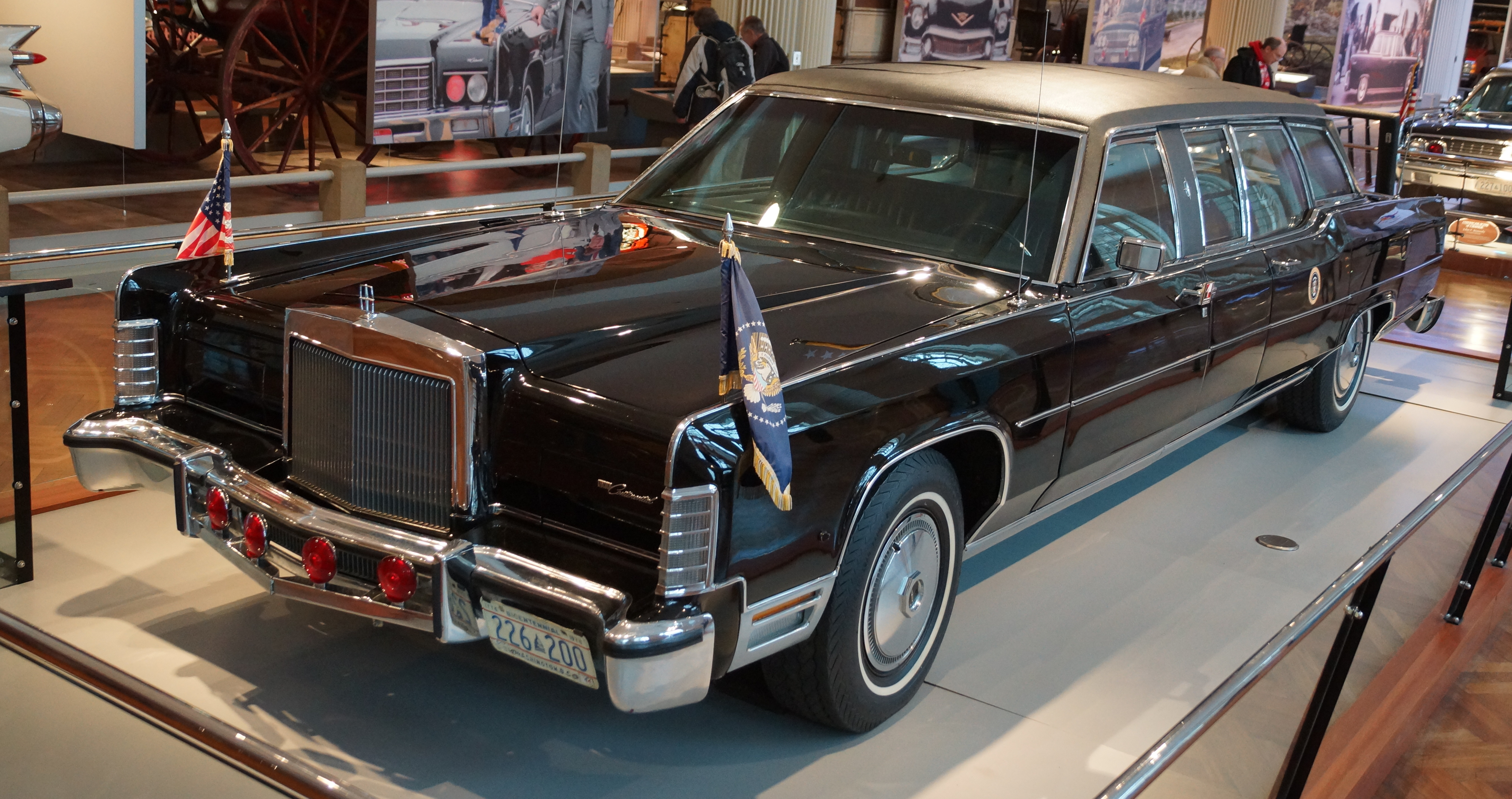
The 1972 Lincoln limousine in 2016-note the conversion to appear as a clone of a 1979 model

The car was used by presidents Nixon, Ford, Carter, Ronald Reagan, and George H. W. Bush. By 1974, the car was typically transported by the United States Air Force in a Lockheed C-141 Starlifter cargo plane at an hourly jet fuel cost of 1,800 US gallons (6,800 L; 1,500 imp gal). Because security concerns legally mandated its use by the president, political parties were not required to reimburse the government for its use during political campaigns. It was the vehicle in which Ford was shot at by Sara Jane Moore in 1975. During the March 1981 attempted assassination of Ronald Reagan, the car was hit by the last two of six gunshots, which respectively damaged the bulletproof window of the right rear passenger's door, and ricocheted off the back-right quarter panel before striking the president. The car then transported Reagan to George Washington University Hospital.

After the 1981 shooting, the car was returned to Ford and was modified. Sources state that it received a new interior, front sheet metal, and 1979 Lincoln grille, a visual inspection shows the magnitude of modification was much greater. Bolt-off bolt-on modification was performed to the vehicle rendering it an apparent clone a 1979 model, the final production year of the fifth generation Lincoln Continental(1970-1979). External accoutrements specific to the 1972 model were replaced with the accoutrements of the 1979 model during the overhaul. This change includes the complete front clip (bumper, header panel with grille and headlight doors, fenders, front marker lenses, and hood), bolt-on fender flares replacing the rear wheel skirts, and the complete taillight and rear bumper assembly. The limousine received a custom formal squared off roofline as originally built, unlike factory production 1972 Lincoln Continentals with a slope backed roof; later production Continentals have a revised squared off rear roof line, thus the limousine roofline closely resembles that of 1979 production model.

The 1972 car left service in 1992 with 40,617 miles (65,367 km) on its odometer. After maintenance and care in 2008, The Henry Ford measured the car at 259 inches (6,600 mm) long, 79.6 inches (2,020 mm) wide, 61.1 inches (1,550 mm) tall, at 10,440 pounds (4,740 kg), with a wheelbase of 161 inches (4,100 mm).

== 1983 Cadillac Fleetwood ==
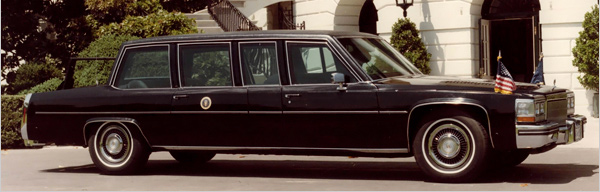
The 1983 Cadillac Fleetwood

The next presidential state car was a 1983 Cadillac that was delivered on January 30, 1984. This Cadillac Fleetwood is 17 inches (430 mm) longer and 3 inches (76 mm) taller than the stock Fleetwood. It featured armor and bulletproof glass (2 3/8 inches [60 mm] thick), and was described as "distinctively styled, with a raised roof and a large rear greenhouse." To compensate for the weight of the armor, the car had oversized wheels and tires, heavy-duty brakes, and an automatic leveling system.

== 1989 Lincoln Town Car ==
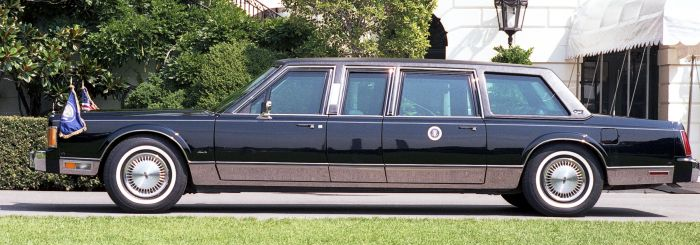
The 1989 Lincoln Town Car

A 1989 Lincoln Town Car, 22 feet (6.7 m) long and more than 5 feet (1.5 m) tall, was delivered to the White House on request of the George H. W. Bush administration. It featured an extra section behind the B pillar, containing rear facing seats, a redesigned E-pillar with forward facing seats, as well as a raised roof.

== Clinton Cadillac Fleetwood ==
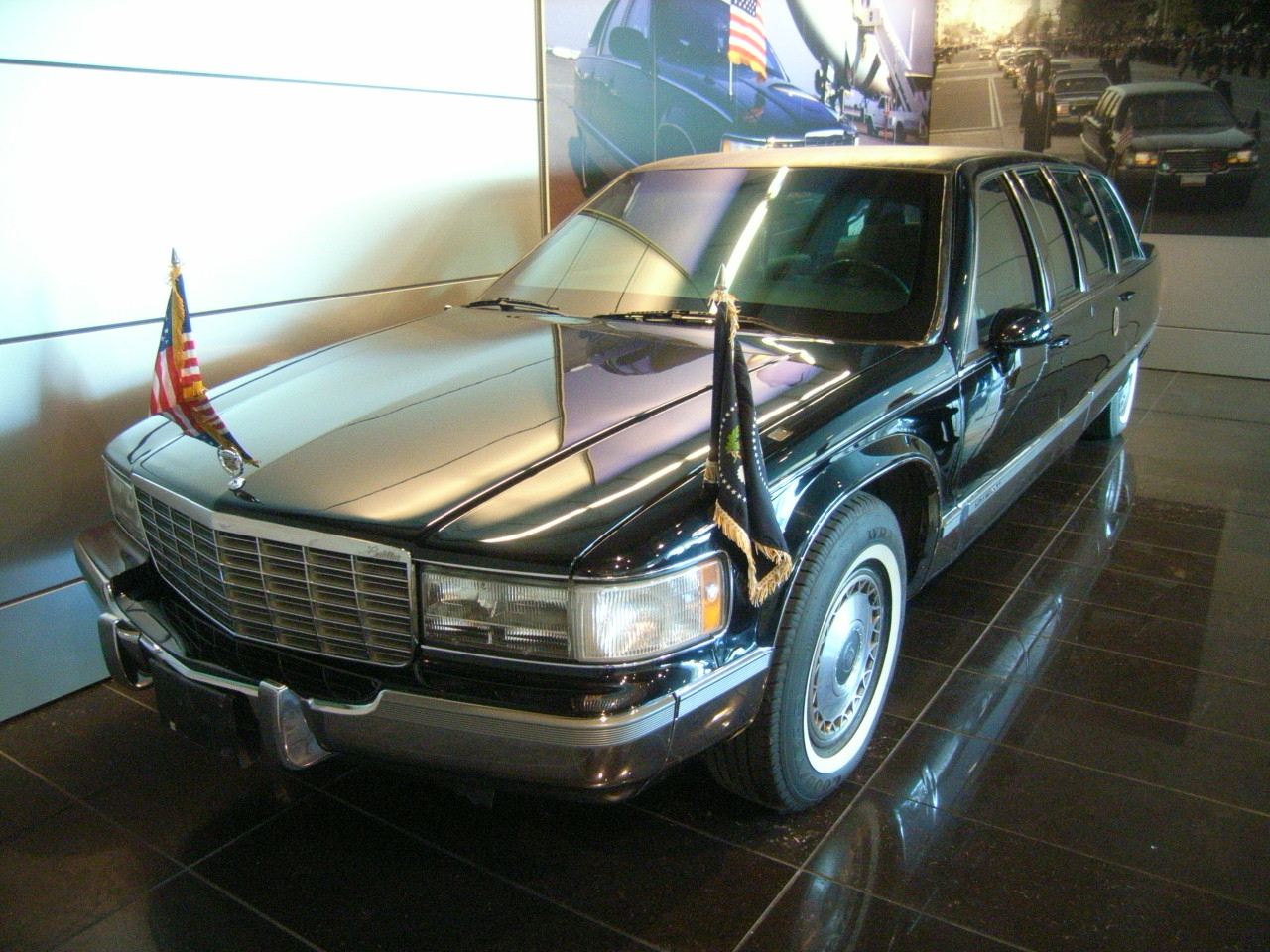
The 1993 Cadillac Fleetwood

President Bill Clinton used a 1993 Cadillac Fleetwood as his presidential state car. It is currently on display at the Clinton Presidential Center in Little Rock, Arkansas, where it sits with all its doors closed to the public. Museum curator Christine Mouw noted that they can "dust the outside of the car, but if we needed to get inside it, we would have to contact the regional Secret Service office".

CNN interviewed Joe Funk, a former Secret Service agent and driver of Clinton's presidential state car during part of his tenure. Funk described a dichotomy of the car: while the president is wholly cut off from the outside world by the armor and bulletproof glass of the vehicle, he has at his fingertips communication capabilities including phones, satellite communications, and the Internet.

== 2001–2009 custom Cadillac ==
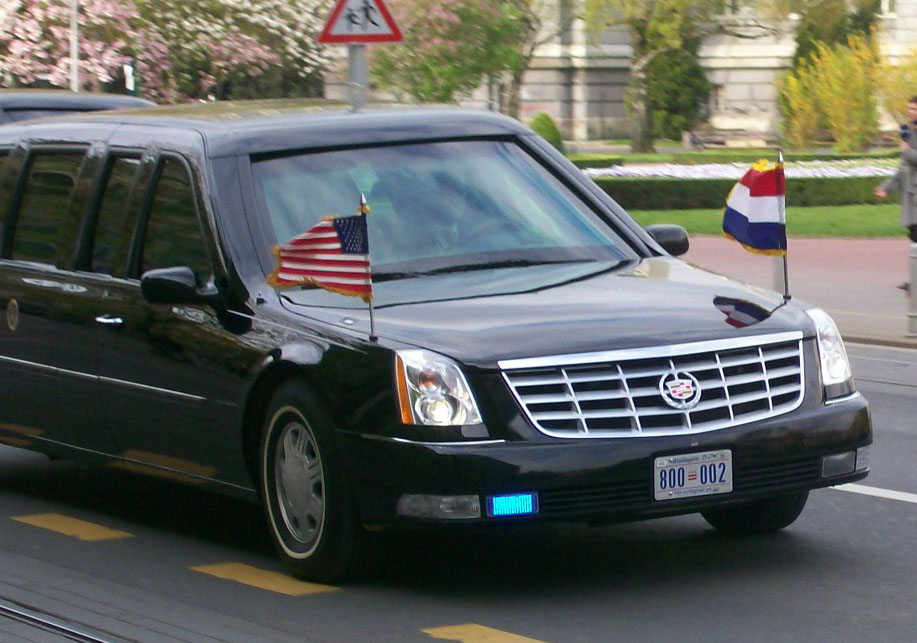
George W. Bush's limousine in Zagreb, Croatia in 2008, after it was modified to resemble a Cadillac DTS

In 2001, for the first inauguration of George W. Bush, Cadillac no longer produced a car suitable for conversion into a presidential limousine. The additional armor and amenities that were added to the state car by the Secret Service taxed previous presidential limousines beyond their limits, resulting in failing transmissions and short-lived brakes. The George W. Bush state car was instead designed from the ground-up by "an R&D arm of General Motors in Detroit" to meet Secret Service specifications.

"[I]nformed speculation" had President George W. Bush's Cadillac Deville actually based on the chassis of General Motors' line of full-size sport utility vehicles such as the "Chevrolet Suburban, GMC Yukon[,] and Cadillac Escalade." This "Deville" featured five-inch (130 mm) armored doors, and "bulletproof glass so thick it blocks out parts of the light spectrum." Rumored components of the car were sealed passenger compartments with their own air supply, run-flat tires, and a 454-cubic-inch (7.44 L) engine. Confirmed accessories include "an integrated 10-disc CD changer, a foldaway desktop[,] and reclining rear seats with massaging, adaptive cushions." This presidential state car was estimated to weigh approximately 14,000 pounds (6,400 kg).

When the DeVille was replaced by the Cadillac DTS for the 2006 model year, the exterior of the vehicle was modified to resemble the new sedan by January 2005. The Second inauguration of George W. Bush thus was utilized as a publicity stunt for General Motors to preview the DTS before it was pubicilly unveiled at the Chicago Auto Show weeks later.

Bush's presidential state car was nicknamed "The Beast", a name that persisted through the first presidency of Donald Trump. When traveling, President Bush took along two of the armored limousines (flown by either C-5 or C-17), one for use and one for backup. This proved fortuitous during a 2007 trip to Rome where one of the presidential state cars stalled for five minutes on a street; the car was restarted, but was replaced with the backup limousine after President Bush reached his destination. Sometimes, President Bush would instead use vehicles already present at his destination such as embassy motor pool cars or military assets, rather than transporting the presidential state car. The president never used non-American-governmental vehicles when overseas.

== 2009–2018 custom Cadillac ==
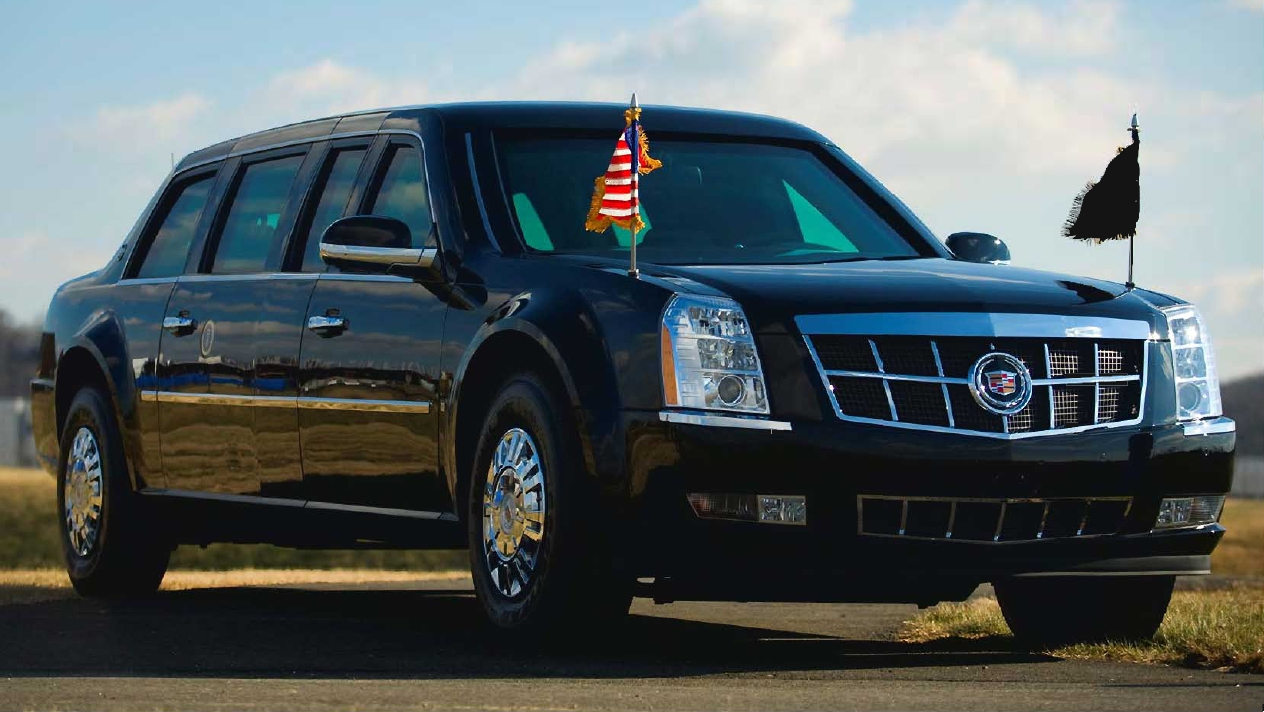
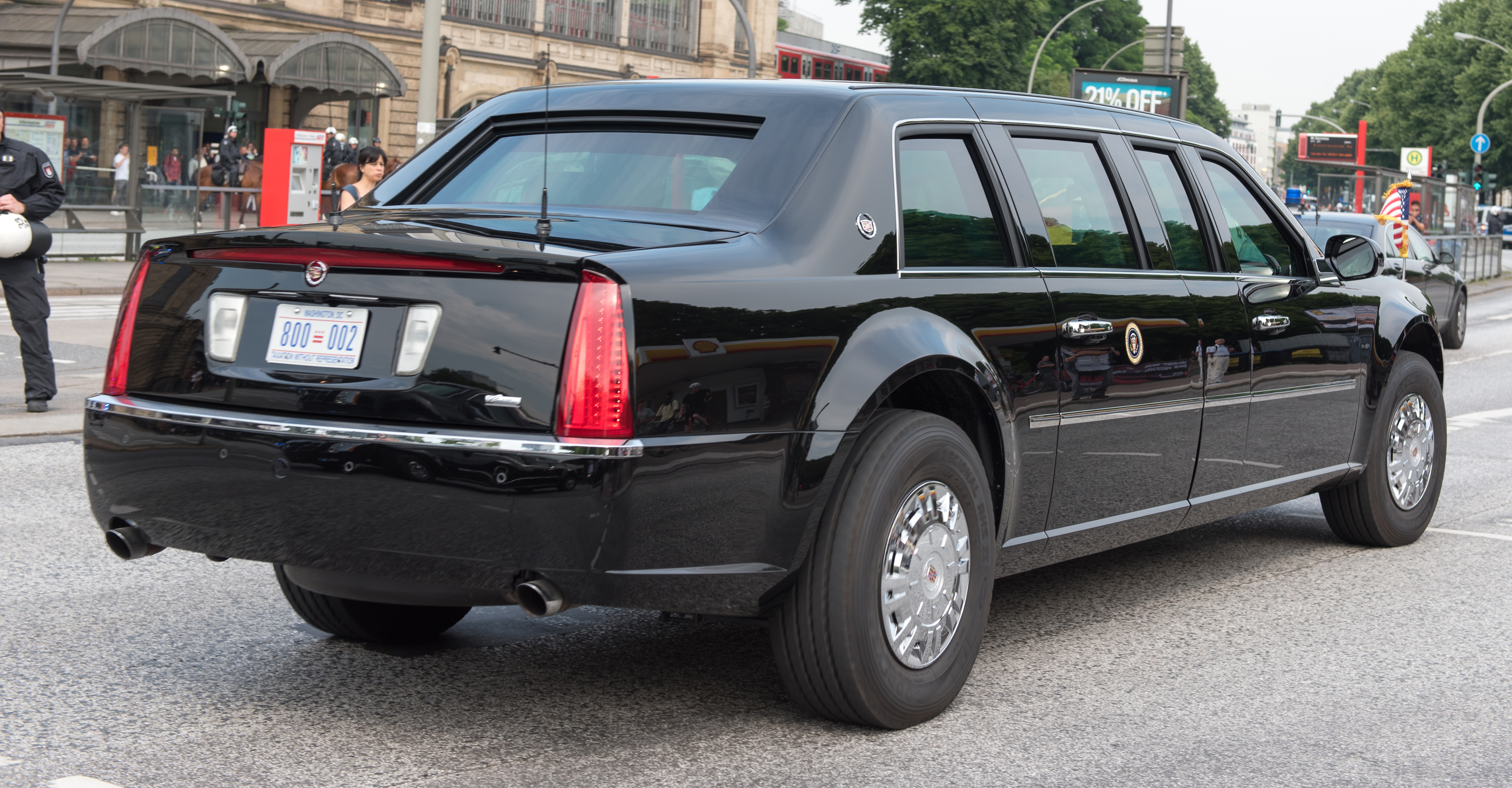
The 2009–2018 car

The 2009–2018 presidential state car went into service on January 20, 2009, and drove President Obama the two miles (3.2 km) down Pennsylvania Avenue from his first inauguration to the inaugural parade. A Cadillac, the presidential state car was not based on any single model of car, though it had the "dual-textured grille and the dinner plate-sized Cadillac coat-of-arms badge" emblematic of the Cadillac CTS and the Cadillac Escalade. The headlights and taillights were identical to those used on other Cadillac production models. Anton Goodwin of CNET's Road/Show blog noted that speculation was that the presidential state car was based on the GMC Topkick platform.

In 2009, Goodwin assumed the car would feature either a gasoline-powered 8.1-liter (490 cu in) V8 General Motors Vortec engine or a diesel-powered Duramax 6.6-liter (400 cu in) turbo V8 engine. Autoweek magazine asserted in 2013 that the car ran on a gasoline-fueled engine.

This presidential state car was also believed to be much heavier than its predecessor as it is equipped with Goodyear Regional RHS tires that are usually reserved for medium- and heavy-duty trucks; speculated weights range from 15,000 to 20,000 pounds (6,800 to 9,100 kg). Due to the weight of the car, it could only reach about 60 mph (97 km/h), and only achieved 3.7 to 8 miles per US gallon (64 to 29 L/100 km; 4.4 to 9.6 mpg_{‑imp}). The limousine was reported to cost between $300,000 and $1,500,000 (equivalent to about $500,000–2,100,000 in 2025). The presidential state car was maintained by the United States Secret Service.

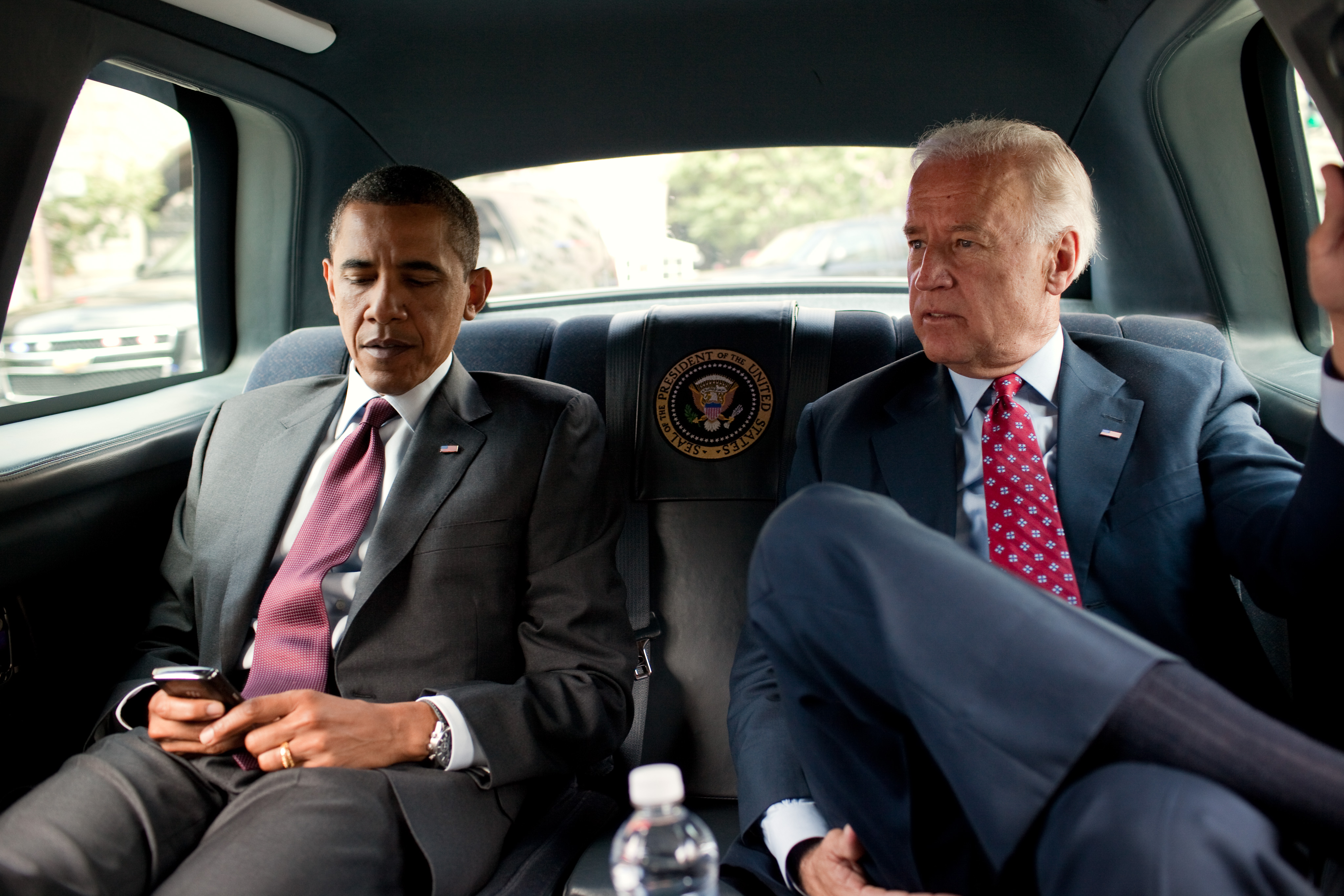
Barack Obama and Joe Biden riding in a presidential state car (July 2010)

The car had more five-inch (130 mm) bulletproof glass than the previous model. It also had run-flat tires and an interior that was completely sealed to protect the occupants in the event of a chemical attack. The 2009 presidential state car model had night vision optics, a tear gas cannon, onboard oxygen tanks, an armored fuel tank filled with foam to prevent explosion, and pump-action shotguns. Whether it was or was not armed with rocket-propelled grenades, the car featured eight-inch (200 mm) doors.

General Motors spokeswoman Joanne K. Krell said of the presidential state car, "The presidential vehicle is built to precise and special specifications, undergoes extreme testing and development, and also incorporates many of the top aspects of Cadillac's 'regular' cars—such as signature design, hand-cut-and-sewn interiors, etc." The curator of The Henry Ford told The Dallas Morning News that President Obama's state car was "a tank with a Cadillac badge."

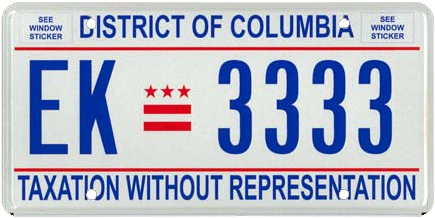
Washington, D.C. license plate

In 2013, the presidential state car was outfitted with standard Washington, D.C. license plates that read "TAXATION WITHOUT REPRESENTATION" in reference to the district's lack of representation in the United States Congress. The switch came after the D.C. city council petitioned President Obama to use the plates on his motorcade, which would be seen by millions of people as he headed down Pennsylvania Avenue for his second inauguration.

== Current state car ==
"The Beast"
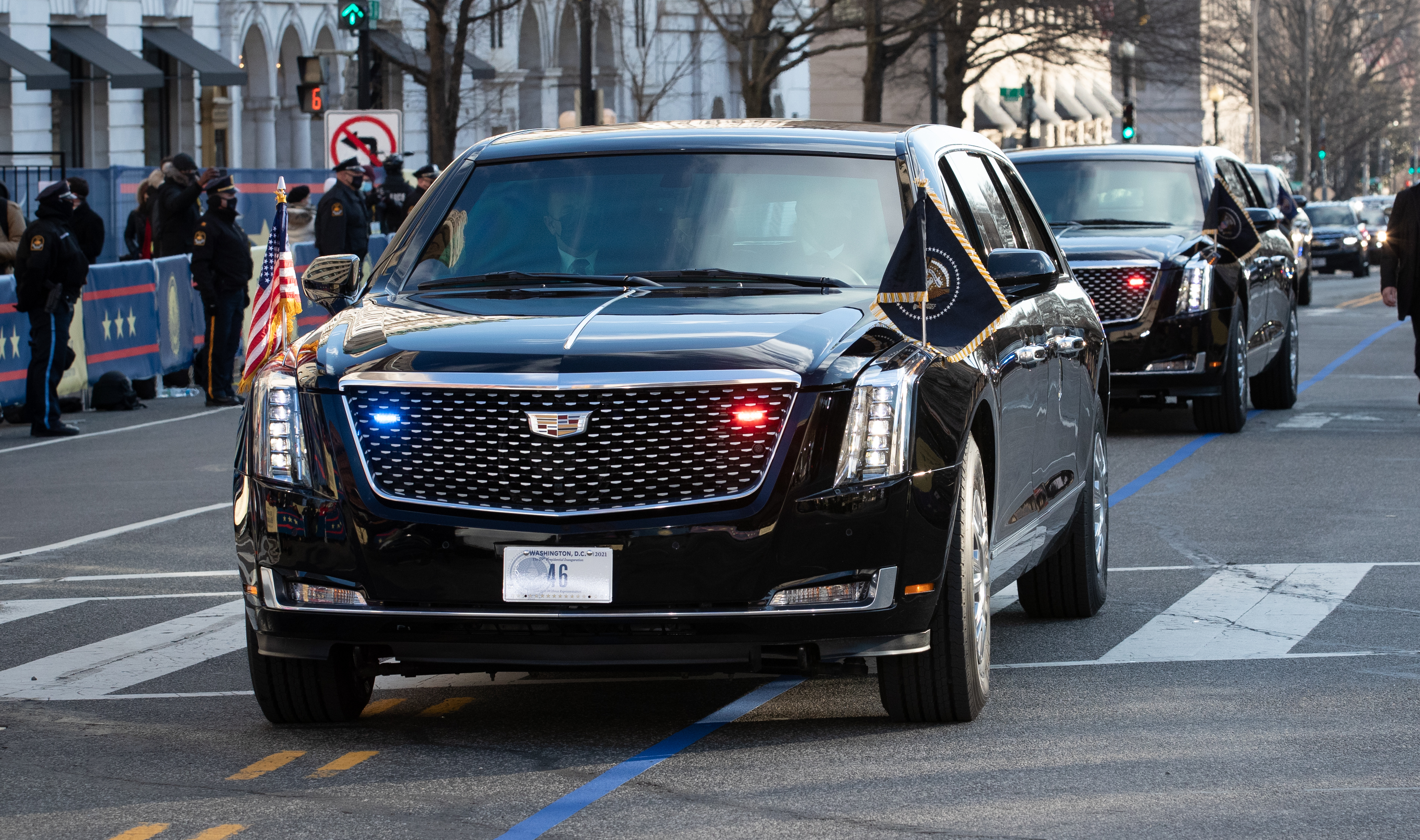
- A current-model state car in January 2021

Overview
- Manufacturer: General Motors

Body and chassis
- Class: Limousine
- Platform: GMC TopKick

Dimensions
- Curb weight: 15,000–20,000 pounds (6,800–9,100 kilograms)

Chronology
- Predecessor: 2009–2018 version

=== Development ===
When first commissioned by the Secret Service in 2014, General Motors (GM) was awarded three contracts for the new limousine. Each state car was expected to cost US$1–1.5 million, and by January 2016, GM had been paid $15,800,765 (equivalent to $21,196,950 in 2025) for its work on the new model.

After prototypes of the new model were seen driven on public roads wrapped in monochromatic multi-scale camouflage, Cadillac confirmed to Fox News that "We've completed our task and we've handed over the vehicle to the customer". The Secret Service confirmed that the program to replace the presidential car was "on track and on schedule" and should be in service by late summer 2018. Fox News' Gary Gastelu opined that the camouflaged prototype looked similar to the Cadillac CT6.

=== Realization ===
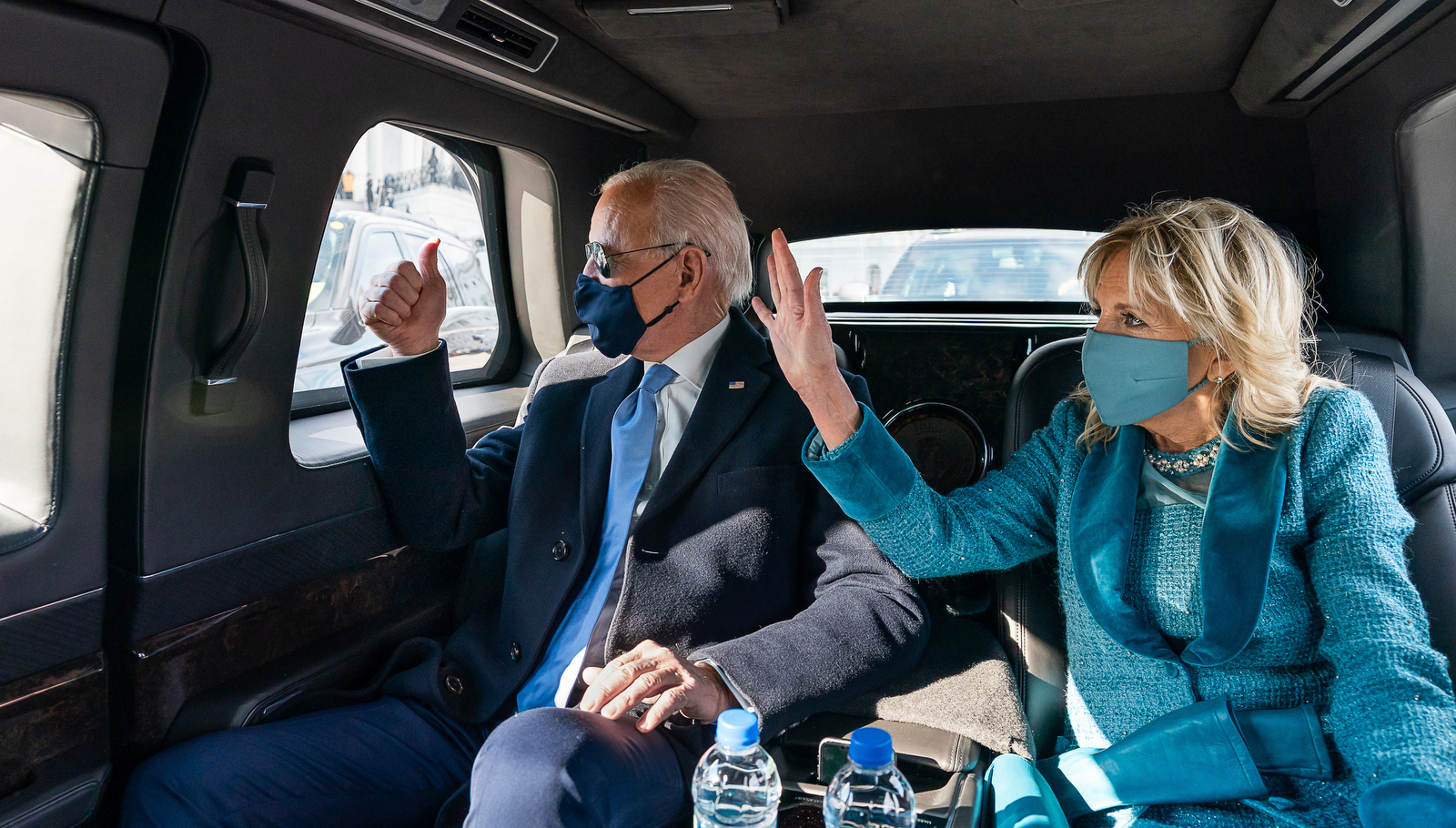
Joe and Jill Biden, 20 January 2021

Still nicknamed "the Beast", as established with the 2001–2009 model, the current model debuted with a trip by President Trump to New York City on September 24, 2018. Road & Track reported that "the design appears to be a simple evolution of the old model with more current Cadillac design cues, like an Escalade sedan." Road & Track described the state car as "massive and tall", and weighing 15,000–20,000 pounds (6,800–9,100 kg).

NBC News reported a weight of 20,000 pounds and the capacity to seat seven, and speculated that the limousine was intended to evoke the aesthetic of the Cadillac XT6. Car and Driver said that the car was built on the GMC TopKick platform, weighs as much as 15,000 pounds, has the headlamps from the Cadillac Escalade, and the grille emblematic of the Cadillac Escala concept car. The car is approximately six feet (1.8 m) tall.

In addition to defensive measures designed to protect the president, this state car has stores of blood in the president's type for medical emergencies. The car is hermetically sealed against chemical attacks, and features run-flat tires, night-vision devices, smoke screens, and oil slicks as defensive measures against attackers. NBC reported that the car features armor made of aluminum, ceramic, and steel; the exterior walls have a thickness of eight inches (200 mm), the windows are multi-layered and five inches (130 mm) thick, and each door—believed to be one foot (0.30 m) thick and weigh as much as those on a Boeing 757—can electrify its handles to deter entry.

As of May 2019, the current model was used alongside the previous model.

=== Cadillac Escalade ===
In January 2026, Donald Trump used a new armored presidential Cadillac Escalade when he attended the World Economic Forum in Davos, Switzerland. It is unclear if this new vehicle is intended to replace the "Beast" sedans, or if it is designed for specific duty such as presidential trips abroad. It has been noted that custom Secret Service vehicles typically have an 8-year service life, and the current "Beasts" will hit that service life in 2026.

== End of service ==
Upon the end of the presidential limo service life, the US Secret Service sometimes retain older models for training purposes at the Secret Service Training Center. Most limos are eventually destroyed by being used in target practice. Firearms and explosive devices are used to test the ability of the security along with ensuring that sensitive equipment is properly destroyed. The remains will be sent to an incinerator or a shredder for complete destruction.

== Presidential motorcades ==
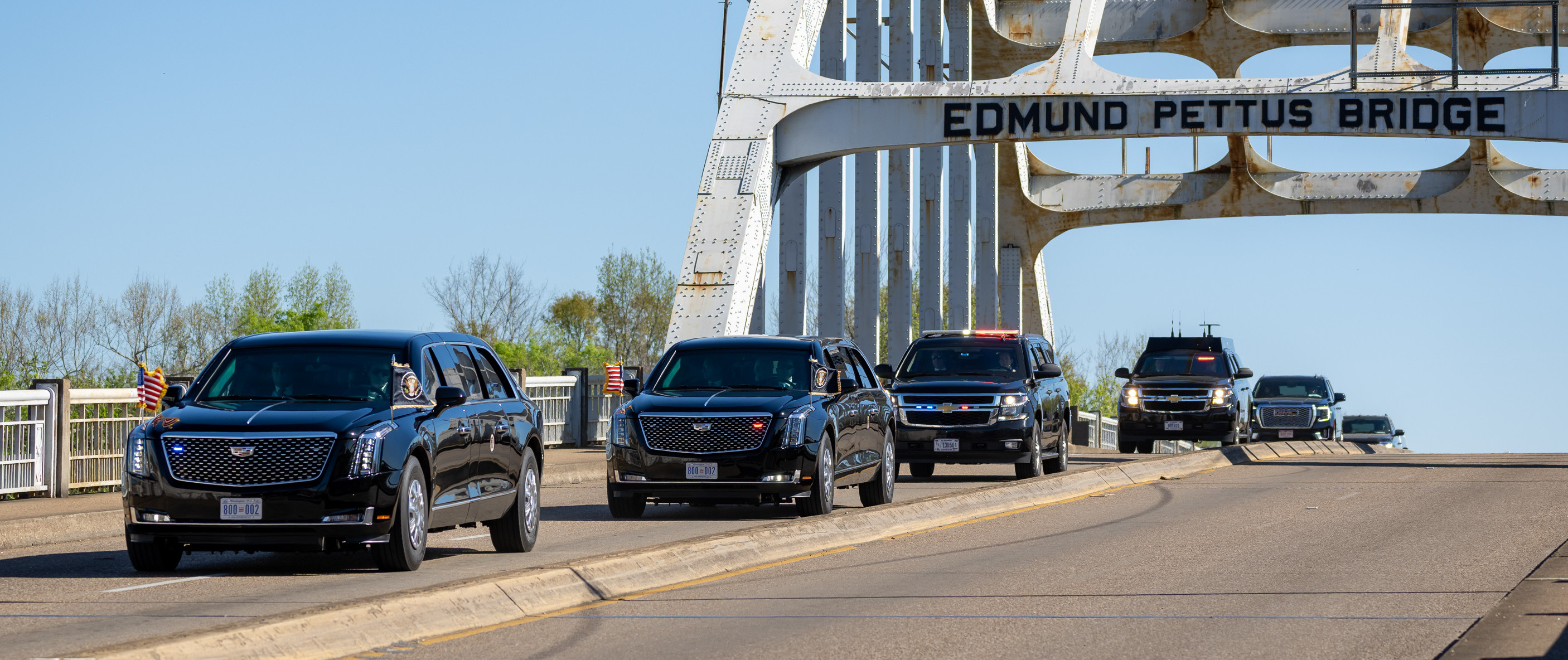
Presidential motorcade crossing the Edmund Pettus Bridge in March 2023

Motorcades involving the presidential state car are detailed, involved operations.

Upon the assassination of John F. Kennedy, the motorcade consisted of four motorcycle escorts, three buses, and over 17 cars (including the presidential state car). Motorcades under President George W. Bush involved up to two dozen cars. Under President Obama they constituted 30 other vehicles, including police cars to lead the motorcade and clear the streets; sport utility vehicles to carry the United States Secret Service detail, electronic countermeasures, key staff, a Secret Service Counter Assault Team, "hazardous-materials-mitigation" personnel and equipment, and White House Communications Agency personnel; press vans; an ambulance; and more.

The presidential state car is maintained by the United States Secret Service. Other support vehicles in the president's motorcade are maintained by the White House Military Office. Due to difficulty in organizing motorcades, helicopters (Marine One) are preferred.

== See also ==
- Ferdinand Magellan (railcar) – U.S. presidential railroad car
- Ground Force One – State motor coach of the president of the United States
- List of official vehicles of the president of the United States
- Official state car – Secured vehicles used to transport heads of state or government

== Depictions in art, media, and literature ==
The 2026 film The Beast fictionalizes the car's offensive measures against domestic terrorism in the United States.
