= Empire (graphic novel) =

1978 graphic novel by Samuel R. Delany

- First edition
- Author: Samuel R. Delany
- Illustrator: Howard Chaykin
- Language: English
- Genre: Fiction, graphic novel, speculative fiction, science fiction
- Publisher: Berkley Windhover and Byron Preiss Visual Publications
- Publication date: 1978
- Publication place: United States
- ISBN: 0-425-03900-5

Empire is a 1978 graphic novel written by Samuel R. Delany and illustrated by Howard Chaykin.

== Plot ==
Thousands of years in the future, a powerful device has been hidden in separate pieces. Qrelon, whose planet was destroyed by the empire, leads a small group of rebels that risk everything to collect the pieces of the device that, once complete, will be the weapon powerful enough to destroy the planet-sized computer that runs the empire. Wryn, an archaeology student, is chosen by the empire to assassinate the rebel leader.

== Style ==
Empire is categorized as speculative fiction and science fiction. The graphic novel is a fantastical foray into space and planetary travel. It is 120 pages long.

Delany challenges traditional stylistic approaches to the science fiction genre by selecting a protagonist and sidekick who are both female. In a 1979 interview, Delany notes the lack of representation of women in speculative fiction as well as female friendships within this genre, highlighting how he has broken "a lot of mythical patterns" by selecting this approach. Yet, despite this claim, Delany continues to comment that he wishes he had focused on this female friendship more, arguing that they may not have "done enough with the woman sidekick" and that "there are times when the male point-of-view-character almost displaces her."

In regards to illustrations, Chaykin primarily utilizes three-panelled pages which feature bold, detailed, and colourful painted graphics. This artistic approach allows Delany and Chaykin to portray "action [which] shifts from landscape to landscape pretty quickly."

== Reception ==
Reviews contemporary with Empire's publication identify issues with the visual novel's integration of literary and visual storytelling techniques. Richard E. Geis' review in Science Fiction Review, derides Empire as a "basic interstellar Star Wars plot" that is not at par with some of Delany’s other fiction and suggests "the pretty comic book pictures [are] where it's at in this book." Bob Toomey in The Comics Journal writes a more detailed criticism of Empire's failings in terms of literary merit and visual design and concludes that "in nearly all respects" Empire is "boring, hard to follow, and poorly conceived." Algis Budrys thought that while the story was imperfect, recommended the work overall: "Some of the plot transitions are a trifle abrupt, and it seems characteristic of this kind of story that the brave revolutionaries overthrow the interstellar oppressors rather easily when all is said and done. But the saying and the doing are first-class."

The graphic novel received 8th place in the 1979 Locus Award for Best SF Art or Illustrated Book.

== Publication history ==
Published in 1978, Empire is regarded as one of the first graphic novels in the United States. The first edition of Empire was published as a hardcover by Berkley Windhover with Byron Preiss.

Delany and Chaykin, illustrator of Star Wars comics, had been looking to collaborate since the late 1960s. In 1976, Delany, Chaykin and Preiss, who knew Chaykin from school, finally began to discuss and devise a visual novel which would become Empire.

Before its publication, Mediascene reported that Berkley Publishing science fiction editor David Hartwell was so confident about this "breakthrough novel in graphic story form" that the print run for the $9.95 paperback edition was planned for 50,000 copies, with 1,500 signed and numbered hardcovers retailed at $24 each.

=== Edits by Byron Preiss ===
In 1977, Preiss told convention-goers that for Empire, "separate, type-set text was necessary for commercial reasons."

In a 1979 interview with The Comics Journal, Delany recalled Preiss suggesting that Empire would use no speech balloons because "they made things look too comicy," which Delany thought "was a mistake." Despite being marketed as a "science fiction novel," the writer protested that "I never thought of it as such... I think of it as a comic book."

In the same interview, Delany also remarked that Preiss "rewrote a good number of my sentences… I take full responsibility for maybe half the sentences in the text." A more exact figure was provided by Delany in a later volume of The Comics Journal in a Letter to the Editor, in which he says "a mere 39 percent" had been rewritten by Preiss.

== Influences ==
When asked about his influences for writing Empire in a 1979 interview with The Comics Journal, Delany acknowledges being largely inspired by comic writers he admires, including, but not limited to: Dennis O'Neil, Neal Adams, Jim Aparo, S. Clay Wilson, Jan Strnad, Lee Marrs, Richard Corben, and Trina Robbins. Chaykin identifies his greatest artistic influence as former DC Comics' and Marvel Comics' artist, Gil Kane. Delany and Chaykin have each acknowledged their interest in working together as well as their admiration of each other's work.

Aside from Delany's and Chaykin's personal influences, Empire is undoubtedly influenced by the creative direction of Preiss, who took many personal liberties in editing as he altered the style and content of the creators' work.

Oxford Bibliographies also identifies Métal Hurlant, a French science fiction magazine, as a potential source of inspiration or influence for Empire.
