= Empire Township =

Empire Township may refer to the following places in the United States:

- Empire Township, McLean County, Illinois
- Empire Township, Ellsworth County, Kansas
- Empire Township, McPherson County, Kansas
- Empire Township, Dakota County, Minnesota
- Empire Township, Leelanau County, Michigan
- Empire Township, Andrew County, Missouri
- Empire Township, North Dakota
