= Empire, Wyoming =

Former community in Wyoming, US, populated and administered by African Americans

Coordinates: 42.1653°N 104.0640°W

Empire, Wyoming was an all-black community of ex-slave families who settled in the Spoon Hill Creek Valley in Goshen County, Wyoming, near the Nebraska state border, between 1908 and 1920. This group of individuals is separate from the "Exodusters" who moved West in the late nineteenth century.

== History ==
Empire, WY was founded in 1908 by African American families from Custer County, Nebraska. At its peak in 1911, Empire's population reached around 50 African American residents. The community had a post office, a Presbyterian church, and its own school. The settlers practiced dryland farming and the residents managed to grow crops such as potatoes, sweet corn, cucumbers, and millet.

Russell Taylor, an ordained Presbyterian minister, moved to Empire in 1911 with his family. Taylor applied for the organization of a post office on December 29, 1915.

By the 1920s, economic hardships, such as a severe drought in 1919, and continued racial violence led to the gradual decline of the community.

By 1930, Empire had largely disappeared, with only a few Black families remaining in the area.

== Legacy ==
Today, two historical markers commemorate the homesteaders who lived in Empire. One is located on the Interstate 25's Dwyer Junction Rest Area close to the town of Wheatland, Wyoming. The second commemoration was placed in Torrington, Wyoming, next to the Goshen County Homesteaders Museum.
