= Peter Langston =

American computer programmer (born 1946)

Peter Langston (born 1946) is a computer programmer who wrote and distributed for free, several games for Unix systems in the 1970s, including one of the earliest text adventure video games Wander, the original version of Empire and the program "Oracle" upon which the later net-wide Oracle was modeled. He is also an experienced jazz, rock, and folk musician. He wrote his first game in 1965.

In 1982, he was hired as the first employee by the Computer Division of Lucasfilm to start Lucasfilm Games. He hired the programming and design teams and wrote the music for and contributed to the game design of Lucasfilm Games' first two releases, Ballblazer and Rescue on Fractalus!. In fact, for Ballblazer, Langston created an algorithmic composition system, which allowed the game to improvise music (from an initial set of musical snippets contributed by famous musicians) based on what is happening in the game. Langston later left Lucasfilm Games for Bellcore (now Telcordia Technologies). Langston retired in 1991, and is now consulting and running adult music camps.
