= The Empire Duet =

Book series by Orson Scott Card

The Empire Duet is a two-book series written by Orson Scott Card under license from Chair Entertainment, beginning with Empire in 2006. The sequel Hidden Empire was released December 22, 2009.

== Video game ==
Shadow Complex, released in 2009, is a video game set in the world of The Empire Duet.

== See also ==
- List of works by Orson Scott Card
