= Empire Records (disambiguation) =

Empire Records is a 1995 film.

Empire Records can also refer to:

- Empire Records, a label founded in 1979 by Tim Berne
- Empire Distribution, a record label founded in 2010
- Empire Entertainment, a fictional record label in Empire (2015 TV series)
