= Empire (program) =

Empire is a computer software for semiempirical Molecular Orbital calculations designed to run in parallel on multi-core desktop computers and on massively parallel supercomputers. Empire is used to calculate chemical structures and is able to calculate large systems such as proteins .
