= Inland Empire Magazine =

American lifestyle magazine

- Categories: American lifestyle magazines
- Frequency: Monthly
- Publisher: Brenda Lorenzi
- Total circulation: 41,857 (June 2012)
- Founder: Donald Lorenzi
- Founded: 1976
- Country: USA
- Based in: Riverside, California
- Language: English
- Website: inlandempiremagazine.com
- ISSN: 0199-5073

Inland Empire Magazine is a lifestyle magazine focused on entertainment, dining, and other topics related to the Inland Empire Metropolitan Area of Southern California. It was established in 1976. The magazine's offices are located in Riverside, California.

== History ==
The magazine was founded by 1976 by 32-year-old Donald Lorenzi. At that time circulation was 5,000, with another thousand sold at retailers. He funded the magazine's launch with a $1,000 and "a lot of credit." Lorenzi went on to start Lorenzi Estate Vineyards & Winery in Temecula.
