= Inland Empire (disambiguation) =

The Inland Empire is a geographic region in Southern California, once referred to as the Orange Empire.

Inland Empire may also refer to:

== Geography ==
- Inland Northwest, a geographic region encompassing Eastern Washington and North Idaho
- Inland Empire State, a nickname for Illinois, perhaps in rivalry with New York, the Empire State; see Outline of Illinois § General reference

== Arts, entertainment, and media ==
- Inland Empire (film), a 2006 film directed by David Lynch
- Inland Empire Magazine, a lifestyle magazine focused on topics related to the Inland Empire in Southern California
- "Inland Empire", one of the 24 skills in the video game Disco Elysium

== Sports ==
- Inland Empire 66ers of San Bernardino, a California League baseball team
