= Imperium (Blouse album) =

Professional ratings
Aggregate scores
| Source | Rating |
|---|---|
| Metacritic | 67/100 |
Review scores
| Source | Rating |
| Allmusic | 3.5/5 stars |
| Consequence of Sound | D |
| DIY | 7/10 |
| Drowned in Sound | 7/10 |
| Filter | 76% |
| Loud and Quiet | 3/10 |
| musicOMH | 3.5/5 stars |
| Pitchfork Media | 7/10 |
| Popmatters | 6/10 |
| Under the Radar | 6.5/10 stars |

Imperium is an album by the American rock band Blouse, released in 2013.
