= Empire State (disambiguation) =

The Empire State is the official nickname of New York State, in the United States of America. Empire State may also refer to:

== Geography ==
- Georgia (U.S. state), nicknamed "Empire State of the South"
- Inland Empire State, an old nickname for Illinois

== Arts, entertainment, and media ==
=== Films ===
- Empire State (1987 film), a British film about gang warfare
- Empire State (2013 film), an American heist film

=== Music ===
- "Empire State", a song by Fleetwood Mac from their album Mirage (1982)
- "Empire State (Son House in Excelsis)", a song by Mercury Rev from their album See You on the Other Side (1995)
- "Empire State", a song by Guster from their album Ganging Up on the Sun (2006)
- Empire State, a 2007 hip hop album by Vast Aire and Karniege
- "Empire State of Mind", a song by Jay-Z and Alicia Keys from The Blueprint 3 (2009)

=== Other uses in arts, entertainment, and media ===
- Empire State, a nation in the fictional universe of Crimson Skies
- Empire State, a 2012 science fiction novel by Adam Christopher
- The Empire State (audio play), an audio play by Big Finish productions

== Buildings ==
- Empire State Building, skyscraper in New York City, one of the tallest buildings in the world
- Empire State Plaza, state office complex in Albany, New York

== Education ==
- Empire State College a state college in New York
- T.S. Empire State VI, a U.S. training vessel operated by the State University of New York Maritime College
- Empire State VII, a training ship owned by the United States Maritime Administration

== See also ==
- List of U.S. state nicknames
