= Empire (2012 TV series) =

- Genre: Documentary
- Written by: Jeremy Paxman
- Directed by: John Hay; Roger Parsons; Robin Dashwood; David Vincent
- Presented by: Jeremy Paxman
- Theme music composer: Chris Nicolaides
- Composer: Chris Nicolaides
- Country of origin: United Kingdom
- Original language: English
- No. of episodes: 5

Production
- Executive producers: Basil Comely (BBC); Catherine McCarthy (Open University)
- Producer: Julian Birkett
- Cinematography: Mike Garner
- Editor: Andrea Carnevali
- Running time: 55–60 minutes
- Production companies: The Open University, BBC productions CoProduction

Original release
- Network: BBC
- Release: 27 February – 26 March 2012

Empire is a 2012 docuseries co-produced and written by the BBC and Open University and presented by Jeremy Paxman. Charting the rise of the British Empire from the trading companies of India to the rule over a quarter of the world's population and its legacy in the modern world.

== Media ==
A book, Empire: What Ruling the World Did to the British, and a region 2 DVD Empire accompany the series.

== Reception ==
The series was criticised by some for its handling of controversial material while trying to avoid offense to numerous stakeholders and audiences. Associate editor of The Guardian, Michael White, said that "the structure of the programme was ramshackle" and he found the narrative to be "episodic and superficial". He said that Paxman "was diffident charm itself", as opposed to treating "the former subjects of empire with his customary ... abrasiveness". While White also found "the photography pretty as always", he concluded that "the overall effect was curiously patronising, serving to reinforce the impression that the great man was basically on a jolly and going through the motions".

Stuart Jeffries, also for The Guardian, offered similar views, concluding that "Jeremy Paxman fails to argue strongly enough".
