= Empire (1972 video game) =

1972 video game

- Designers: Peter Langston; Ben Norton
- Platforms: PDP-11/45 (1972), HP2000 (1972), HP3000 (1984), MS-DOS, Amiga, Macintosh, Windows, Linux (2003)
- Release: 1972, 1984, 2003
- Genres: 4X, wargame

Empire is a 4X computer wargame created in 1972 by Peter Langston, taking its name from a Reed College board game of the same name. It was initially created by Langston in BASIC on an HP2000 minicomputer at Evergreen State College. When the host computer was retired, the source code to the game was lost. Subsequently, two other authors each independently wrote a new version of the game, both named Empire. In the decades since, numerous other versions of Empire have been developed for a wide variety of platforms.

The game is turn-based, with players giving orders at their convenience, and in some versions then executed simultaneously by the game server at set intervals ranging from a few hours to once per day. The game world consists of "sectors", which may be designated as agricultural, industrial, etc. There are dozens of unit types requiring a variety of raw and manufactured materials for their creation. "Blitz" games may last a few hours, typical games a few months, and some larger games up to a year.

== Gameplay ==
Empire is a turn-based 4X wargame, where players command armies of units which they use to explore the game world, control territory, and attack opponents. The game world consists of "sectors", which may be designated as agricultural, industrial, etc. Control of these sectors grants the player a variety of raw and manufactured materials, which they may use to construct dozens of unit types. In each round, the players submit their commands for the activities of their units to the central server, which executes all of the commands either simultaneously or in a sequence. Rounds can last anywhere from a few hours to a day. As such, a full game can take much longer than modern 4X games, depending on the size of the game world; "Blitz" games may last a few hours, while typical games last months and larger games can take up to a year to complete.

== Development ==
Empire was created in 1972 by Peter Langston, taking its name from a Reed College board game of the same name. It was initially created by Langston in BASIC on an HP2000 minicomputer at Evergreen State College. Between 1972 and 1974, Langston expanded on the game, with additions by Ben Norton, Chuck Douglas, Mike Rainwater, and several others. When the host computer was retired, the original game was lost. Subsequently, two other authors each independently wrote a new version of the game, both named Empire, and several ports of the game were created for other computer systems, such as PSL Empire for the PDP 11/70, and a version with added weather effects for the VAX-11. Langston, now at Harvard University, recreated the game in C, and shared the source code with a few other developers; disliking the changes they made, he stopped doing so, maintaining the canonical version of the game until 1985, when he stopped development. Around that time, he gave the source code to a group including Dave Pare, who was attempting to reverse engineer the game. Pare then adapted the game into a version named UCSD Empire after the University of California at San Diego, and the following year into BSD Empire with several additions such as planes.

Numerous other versions were created over the next decade for various computer types, including KSU Empire, Xerox Development Environment (XDE) Empire on Xerox computer workstations, PC Empire by Gordon Storga for MS-DOS, Amiga Empire for the Amiga, and Wolfpack Empire. In 1984, Ben Norton wrote a version titled Empire Classic in Pascal on an HP3000 and released to the HP3000 Contributed Library, which became the definitive version until the Wolfpack Empire project began in 1996. In 2003, the game was ported to the C++ programming language for the Linux operating system, and a subsequent Java client/server version was produced.

== See also ==
- Empire (1977 video game)
