= The Citadel of the Autarch =

1983 science fiction novel by Gene Wolfe

- First edition
- Author: Gene Wolfe
- Cover artist: Don Maitz
- Language: English
- Series: The Book of the New Sun
- Genre: Science fantasy
- Publication date: 1983
- Publication place: United States
- Media type: Print (Hardcover & Paperback)
- Pages: 317
- ISBN: 0-671-45251-7
- Preceded by: The Sword of the Lictor
- Followed by: The Urth of the New Sun

The Citadel of the Autarch is a science fantasy novel by American writer Gene Wolfe, first released in 1983. It is the fourth and final volume in the four-volume series The Book of the New Sun.

In 1987, Wolfe followed this fourth volume with a coda novel entitled The Urth of the New Sun, after complaints from readers that it ended abruptly and without an adequate sense of conclusion. Many consider The Urth of the New Sun to be the fifth and final part of the series.

== Plot introduction ==
Unlike the first books in the series, The Citadel of the Autarch picks up right after the end of the previous one, The Sword of the Lictor. It tells of the travels of Severian, weak and defenseless after his encounter with Baldanders and Dr. Talos. Severian continues his travels, which lead him into war.

== Plot ==
Severian finds himself wandering on the outskirts of the Northern war, and happens upon a dead soldier whom he revives with the Claw. The soldier remains unable to speak as they make their way to the Pelerines camp. Severian suffers from fever and is treated along with others injured in the war. While recovering, Severian judges a storytelling contest meant to win a woman named Foila's heart. He returns the Claw by putting it in an altar. Then, he is tasked to visit a friend of the Pelerines in the mountains, to bring him to the camp and keep him safe from the war. Severian reaches the man's house but, due to time-travel related phenomena, the man disappears as he is led away. Upon returning to the camp, Severian discovers it has been attacked and abandoned. Severian soon finds the survivors. Foila is there and he promises to share her stories.

Eventually, Severian is drawn into war against armies of the North composed of people known as Ascians. Severian nearly dies but is rescued by the androgynous spy he met in the House Absolute, the Autarch of the Commonwealth. Severian is nursed back to health and converses with the Autarch about his role in the Commonwealth. They board a flier and are shot down over the war zone. The Autarch is dying. He tells Severian to consume the alzabo vial around his neck and consume his flesh. By doing so, the hundreds of minds making up the Autarch's would enter Severian, who would become the next Autarch. He also tells Severian that he sent a message to Vodalus of their location, so they will be rescued. Severian is reluctant and they are interrupted by Vodalus' men and Agia descending on the crash site and rescuing them both.

They are flown to the jungles of the north, where they are kept prisoner and brought to the Ascians. Alone together again, Severian speaks with the Autarch, drinks the vial, and consumes his flesh. The minds enter Severian's and the side effects temporarily incapacitate him. He is rescued by Agia and the green time traveler whom he rescued earlier in The Claw of the Conciliator. The green man opens a passage through time in which Severian is then visited by an alien who takes the form of Master Malrubius and Triskele. Malrubius tells him that he must one day face a challenge that will either allow man to return to the stars (if he succeeds) or strip him of his manhood, leaving him infertile, and unable to produce an heir (if he fails). Severian realizes that the last Autarch must have failed, which feminized him and gave him his androgynous looks.

After the meeting, Severian is left on a beach. He discovers a rose bush covered in black thorns and white blossoms, and is pricked. He realizes the thorn is the Claw, and all the thorns are Claws, and keeps it. He remembers seeing a similar bush early in his journey, and ponders the meaning of the Claw in relationship to higher beings, time-travel, and the New Sun.

Severian makes his way back to Nessus aboard a ship whose crew revere him on sight. On the way he visits Dorcas, who has returned to her ruined old home, but leaves unnoticed. In Nessus, he visits people of his past and assumes the role of Autarch. He speaks to the waiter who slipped him the note in the Shadow of the Torturer saying that Agia had been there before. The note was meant for Dorcas, who reminded the waiter of his mother. A picture of Dorcas in a locket around the waiter's neck confirms this suspicion. Severian realizes the waiter resembles him strongly, and it is implied that the waiter is Severian's father. Severian tasks the waiter to protect Dorcas and takes him to her.

The book ends with Severian exploring the citadel and retracing Triskele's steps through an underground building. Seeing the dog's footsteps and his own he follows the latter, returning to the Atrium of Time.

== Reception ==
Dave Langford reviewed The Citadel of the Autarch for White Dwarf #44, and stated that "I think it's extremely good: marvellously written, with a feel for language which Stephen Donaldson would have done well to imitate. Unlike Donaldson's, Wolfe's obscure words lurk unobtrusively until they seem both familiar and - thanks to their careful planting in context - meaningful."

Dave Pringle reviewed The Citadel of the Autarch for Imagine magazine, and stated that "The awful suspicion dawns: are the Ascians commies? Is all this an allegory of the Korean War?"

=== Awards ===
Citadel was nominated for the Nebula Award for Best Novel in 1983, but did not win.
