= The Book of the New Sun =

Novel series by Gene Wolfe

- Front cover of the first one-volume edition (1998)
- Author: Gene Wolfe
- Cover artist: Don Maitz
- Language: English
- Series: Solar Cycle; Book of the New Sun sub-series (Note: ISFDB includes the non-fiction collection The Castle of the Otter (1983) and the "coda" novel The Urth of the New Sun (1987) in the Book of the New Sun sub-series (along with some separately published excerpts).)
- Genre: Science fiction
- Publisher: Simon & Schuster; Orb / Tor Books (first two-volume)
- Publication date: 1980–1983 (four vols.); 1987 (coda); 1994 (two volume ed.)
- Publication place: United Kingdom
- Media type: Print (hardcover first; trade paperback first two-volume ed.)
- Pages: 1225 (1597 including coda)
- ISBN: 1568658079
- OCLC: 30700568
- Dewey Decimal: 813/.54 20
- LC Class: PS3573.O52 S53 1994
- Followed by: The Urth of the New Sun

The Commonwealth

The Book of the New Sun (1980–1983, 1987) is a four-volume science fantasy novel written by the American author Gene Wolfe. The work is in four parts with a fifth novel acting as a coda to the main story. It inaugurated the "Solar Cycle" that Wolfe continued by setting other works in the same universe (The Book of the Long Sun series, and The Book of the Short Sun series).

It chronicles the journey of Severian, a journeyman torturer from the Order of the Seekers for Truth and Penitence. After helping a client kill herself, he is exiled in disgrace to journey to the distant city of Thrax where he is to live out his days as their executioner. Severian lives in the ancient city of Nessus in a nation called the Commonwealth, ruled by the Autarch, in the Southern Hemisphere. It is at war with Ascia, its totalitarian northern neighbor. It is a first-person narrative, purportedly translated by Wolfe into contemporary English, set in a distant future when the Sun has dimmed and Earth is cooler (a "Dying Earth" story).

The four volumes and additional fifth coda are:

- 1980 The Shadow of the Torturer
- 1981 The Claw of the Conciliator
- 1982 The Sword of the Lictor
- 1983 The Citadel of the Autarch
- 1987 The Urth of the New Sun

In a 1998 poll of its subscribers, Locus magazine ranked the tetralogy number three among 36 all-time best fantasy novels before 1990, behind only The Hobbit and The Lord of the Rings by J.R.R. Tolkien. (Note: Locus subscribers voted only two Middle-earth novels by J. R. R. Tolkien ahead of Wolfe's New Sun, followed by Ursula K. Le Guin's Earthsea series. Third and fourth ranks were exchanged in the 1987 rendition of the poll, "All-Time Best Fantasy Novels", which considered as single entries Wolfe's The Shadow of the Torturer and Le Guin's A Wizard of Earthsea, the first volumes of New Sun and Earthsea.)

== Major themes ==
=== Severian as a Christ figure ===
Severian, the main character and narrator of the series, can be interpreted as a Christ figure. His life has many parallels to the life of Jesus, and Gene Wolfe, a Catholic, has explained that he deliberately mirrored Jesus in Severian. He compares Severian's profession as a torturer to Jesus's profession as a carpenter in The Castle of the Otter:

It has been remarked thousands of times that Christ died under torture. Many of us have read so often that he was a "humble carpenter" that we feel a little surge of nausea on seeing the words yet again. But no one ever seems to notice that the instruments of torture were wood, nails, and a hammer; that the man who built the cross was undoubtedly a carpenter too; that the man who hammered in the nails was as much a carpenter as a soldier, as much a carpenter as a torturer. Very few even have seemed to have noticed that although Christ was a "humble carpenter," the only object we are specifically told he made was not a table or a chair, but a whip.

Severian's life parallels Jesus' occasionally, with his descent into the cave of the man-apes being a Harrowing of Hell scene, his resurrection of Dorcas being a Lazarus of Bethany scene, and his friendship with Jonas reflecting Ahasuerus. Jonas has traveled the world looking to reconnect with the Hierodules, "tinkers with clumsy mechanisms", and is redeemed from wandering exile after befriending Severian. In this respect, he represents the wandering Jew. Severian also suffers from occasional seemingly random bleeding from his forehead, as if from a crown of thorns. Also mirroring the crown of thorns, the Claw of the Conciliator, a thorn that causes Severian to shed blood, becomes a religious relic due to its relation to Severian. Terminus Est represents his crucifix, with Severian describing his sword in Urth of the New Sun as a "dark cross upon my shoulder." In the following volume, The Urth of the New Sun, Severian is resurrected as well, escaping to a Heaven-like plane of existence where an angel resides and then emerging from a stone tomb, as Jesus rose from his stone tomb.

However, Wolfe said in an interview, "I don't think of Severian as being a Christ figure; I think of Severian as being a Christian figure. He is a man who has been born into a very perverse background, who is gradually trying to become better."

== Related works ==
During the years when The Book of the New Sun was published, Wolfe published two stories from it separately: "Foila's Story: The Armiger's Daughter" (one of the entries in the story-telling contest in the Pelerines' hospital) and "The Tale of the Student and his Son" (one of the two stories that Severian reproduces from a book he obtained for Thecla when she was imprisoned).

Shortly after The Citadel of the Autarch, Wolfe published The Castle of the Otter, a book of essays about The Book of the New Sun containing a few fictional elements, such as jokes told by some of the characters.

After the original four-volume novel, Wolfe wrote a novel often called a coda, The Urth of the New Sun (1987). He also wrote three short stories, "The Map", "The Cat", and "Empires of Foliage and Flower", that are closely related to The Book of the New Sun.

Later he wrote two book series that are set in Severian's universe. The Internet Speculative Fiction Database catalogs it all as the "Solar Cycle", comprising the short works and three sub-series. The two later subseries are The Book of the Long Sun (1993–1996, four volumes) and The Book of the Short Sun (1999–2001, three volumes). Two of the Long Sun books were nominated for Nebula Awards.

== Place within the genre ==
The Book of the New Sun belongs to the Dying Earth subgenre of speculative fiction. Peter Wright calls the series an "apotheosis" of traditional Dying Earth elements and themes, and Douglas Barbour suggests that the book is a foundational mosaic of that literary heritage:

Wolfe has not only written a truly marvellous science-fantasy set millions of years in our future on a dying 'Urth', but he has also written the book on such works ... where every formal development in this sub-genre is laid out for our interpretation and then done right.

Traces of this literary tradition can be found throughout the book. In The Sword of the Lictor, Cyriaca (the woman whom Severian spares in Thrax) tells Severian a legend about an automated city, with rebirth as a central theme. This mirrors John W. Campbell's Twilight, where sentient machines remove the need for human labor. Wolfe himself said that when he was a teenager Twilight had a great effect on his writing, and this homage to that story is not just a passing reference, but an allusion to a literary predecessor. Earlier in the story, Wolfe alludes to The Time Machine, with the scene where Severian meets the glowing man-apes mirroring the Time Traveler's confrontation with the Morlocks. In both stories, the protagonist holds up a light to awe the cave peoples, but in the Book of the New Sun Severian relates to the humanity of the man-apes with the glowing Claw of the Conciliator, while in The Time Machine the Time Traveler intimidates the Morlocks with his fire.

== Publication history ==
Shadow and Claw
- Cover, by Don Maitz, of the US reprint
- Author: Gene Wolfe
- Original title: The Book of the New Sun, Vols. I & II
- Language: English
- Series: The Book of the New Sun
- Genre: Science fiction
- Publisher: Sidgwick & Jackson
- Publication date: 1983
- Publication place: United Kingdom
- Media type: Print (hardback)
- Pages: 604
- ISBN: 978-0-283-99029-8
- OCLC: 21019355
- Followed by: Sword and Citadel

Gene Wolfe had originally intended the story to be a 40,000-word novella called "The Feast of Saint Catherine", meant to be published in one of the Orbit anthologies, but during the writing, it continued to grow. Despite being published with a year between each book, all four books were written and completed during his free time without anyone's knowledge when he was still an editor of Plant Engineering, allowing him to write at his own pace and take his time.

The tetralogy was first published in English in the United Kingdom by Sidgwick & Jackson from 1980 to 1983, and the coda published in 1987, with second publications for each book occurring approximately a year after the first. Don Maitz illustrated the covers of the US publication, and Bruce Pennington illustrated the covers of the UK publication. The series was also published in two volumes, named Shadow and Claw and Sword and Citadel, both published in 1994 by Orb Publications.

It was published as a single volume titled The Book of the New Sun in 1998 by Science Fiction Book Club and again in 2007 under the title Severian of the Guild, published by Orion Publishing Group.

Each book has been separately translated into Spanish, French, German, Dutch, and Japanese.

The Japanese printings of the tetralogy and coda were illustrated by Yoshitaka Amano.

== Awards and nominations ==
Each of the four original volumes won at least one major fantasy or science fiction award as the year's "Best Novel" as shown by the table below. The tetralogy was not considered as a whole for any of the annual literary awards compiled by the Internet Speculative Fiction Database (ISFDB).

Best Novel of the year? – annual awards
Title (volume or novel)	Award wins	Nominations
The Shadow of the Torturer (Simon & Schuster, 1980)	British Science Fiction; World Fantasy	Balrog (fantasy), Campbell Memorial (3rd place), Locus Fantasy (2nd place), Nebula
The Claw of the Conciliator (Timescape Books, 1981)	Locus Fantasy; Nebula (Science Fiction)	Hugo (Science Fiction) (2nd place), Mythopoeic Fantasy, World Fantasy
The Sword of the Lictor (Timescape Books, 1982)	British Fantasy Award for Best Novel; Locus Fantasy	Balrog, British Science Fiction, Hugo (6th place), Nebula, World Fantasy
The Citadel of the Autarch (Timescape Books, 1983)	Campbell Memorial (Science Fiction)	Balrog, British Science Fiction, Locus Fantasy (2nd place), Nebula
The Urth of the New Sun (Tor Books, 1987)	Science Fiction Chronicle	Hugo, Locus Science Fiction (3rd place), Nebula

== Language ==
=== Vocabulary ===
Gene Wolfe uses a variety of archaic and obscure terms throughout the series and in the appendix of The Shadow of the Torturer he explains his fictitious method:

In rendering this book—originally composed in a tongue that has not yet achieved existence—into English, I might easily have saved myself a great deal of labor by having recourse to invented terms; in no case have I done so. Thus in many instances, I have been forced to replace yet undiscovered concepts by their closest twentieth-century equivalents.

Wolfe admitted, however, that some mistakes may have been made in spelling or exact meaning. His unusual words often come from an English–Latin dictionary or an English–Greek dictionary, where he finds roots of words to use.

Wolfe stated that he uses strange and arcane words because he "thought they were the best for the story [he] was trying to tell." Language is Wolfe's medium as a writer, and he wishes to "press against the limits of prose." Wolfe's deliberate use of exotic words is meant to manipulate the reader and force upon them a certain visualization of the story, but he does not mean to confuse the reader. He compares the narrator, Severian, and the reader to an English-speaking person and a German-speaking person building a boat:

[The English-speaker] would say, "Bring me a flat board," and [the German-speaker] would bring him a board of proper size. They were actually doing something, you see, and the German understood what it was they were doing. Because they were working together (exactly as a writer and reader must) the unintelligible request was heard as "I need something," and the German had little difficulty guessing what was needed.

Why bother, in that case, to learn English? Or learn German? In the narrowest sense, you don't ... But knowing is better and broader and deeper than even the best guessing, and knowing is more fun.

Two examples of the arcane words Wolfe uses are "Ascian" and "Hydrargyrum". Ascian, despite its similarity to "Asian", is derived from a Latin word meaning "without shadow", as the Ascians are tropic dwellers who have no shadow at noon. Hydrargyrum, the fluid contained in Severian's sword Terminus Est, is derived from the Ancient Greek "ὕδωρ", meaning water, and "ἄργυρος", meaning silver, as hydrargyrum is liquid mercury.

=== Ascian language ===
The Ascian language further expounds on the idea that word choice alters the thinking of people, as the Ascian language is simply a set of quotations from government propaganda called "Correct Thought". In order to communicate, Ascians must memorize many quotations and learn to interpret others' use of them. This government regulation of language is intended to directly regulate the thought of Ascians. However, it is illustrated in the novels that the human capacity to adapt language to its own immediate needs and deploy it in unintended or unforeseen ways allows the Ascians to convey meanings outside of or even contradictory to those intended by the creators of "Correct Thought."

== See also ==
- Bildungsroman
