= Aldersgate =

Ward of the City of London

Coordinates: 51°31′03″N 00°05′50″W

- Ward
- Location within Greater London
- Aldersgate ward boundaries since 2013
- Population: 1,465 (2011 Census Ward)
- OS grid reference: TQ321817
- Sui generis: City of London
- Administrative area: Greater London
- Region: London
- Country: England
- Sovereign state: United Kingdom
- Post town: LONDON
- Postcode district: EC1, EC2
- Dialling code: 020
- Police: City of London
- Fire: London
- Ambulance: London
- UK Parliament: Cities of London and Westminster
- London Assembly: City and East

Aldersgate is one of the 25 wards of the City of London, with the City forming the historic and financial centre of Greater London, England. It is named after one of the northern gates in the London Wall which once enclosed the City.

The Ward of Aldersgate is traditionally divided into Aldersgate Within and Aldersgate Without, the suffix denoting whether the part was within the line of the wall or outside it. The ancient ward boundaries were redrawn in 2013; the names are preserved but their location only loosely approximates to their historic extent.

The gate also gave its name to Aldersgate Street, which runs north from the former gate towards Clerkenwell. The street was wholly part of Aldersgate Without ward until a short section further north was renamed and so added to it.

== The gate ==
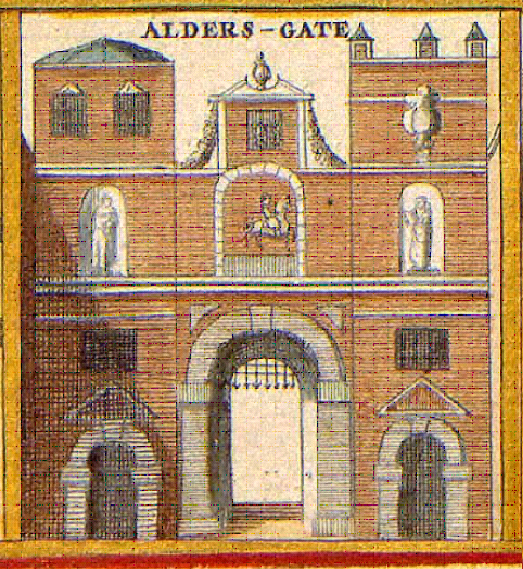
An old illustration of the gate, c. 1650

The Wall was first built around the year 200, but Aldersgate was not one of the original Roman gates, being added later in the Roman period.

The name Aldersgate is first recorded around 1000 in the form Ealdredesgate, i.e. "gate associated with a man named Ealdrād"; the gate probably acquired its name in the late Saxon period.

When James VI of Scotland came to England to take the crowns of both England and Scotland in 1603, he entered the City at Aldersgate. Statues of the king were placed both outside (on horseback) and inside (seated on the throne) the gate to commemorate the occasion.

The old gate was taken down in 1617, and rebuilt in the same year from a design by Gerard Christmas. The gate was damaged in the Great Fire of London in 1666 but was repaired and remained until 1761. Aldersgate Street contained the Bishop of London's chapel and his chambers at London House, which was used from the 18th century because it was closer to St Paul's Cathedral than his official residence in Fulham.

== Ward of Aldersgate ==
Ward boundaries between 2003 and 2013

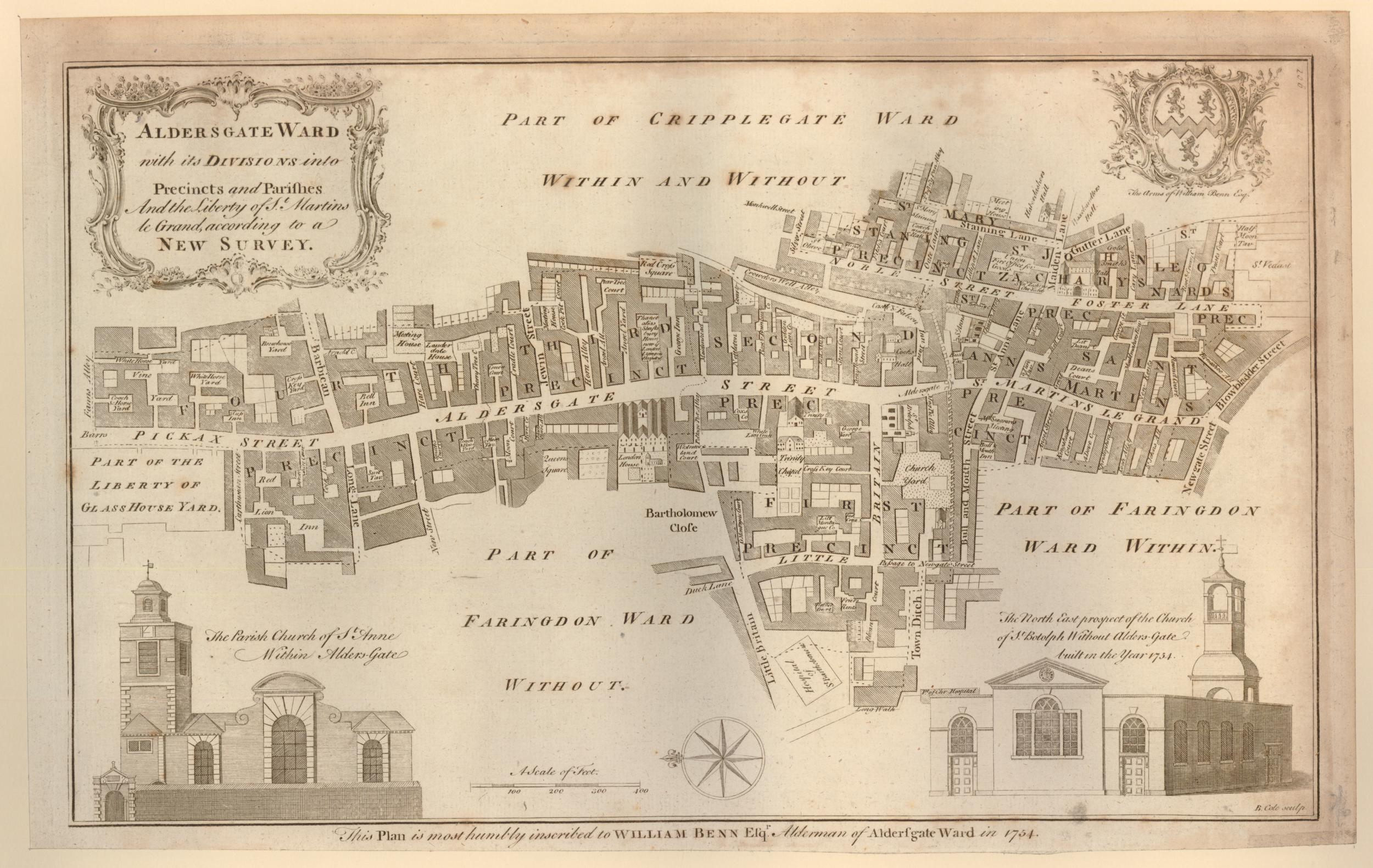
Map of the ward, 1755

The ward of Aldersgate straddles the (now former) line of London Wall and the old gate and historically was divided into "Within" and "Without" divisions, with a deputy (alderman) appointed for each division. There is now only one deputy alderman for the ward.

=== Geography ===
==== Aldersgate Within ====
The Within division was focussed on the buildings on each side of St. Martin's Le Grand (which extends northward as Aldersgate Street), Noble Street and Foster Lane.

The ward took in the liberty of St. Martin's Le Grand when that was disestablished in the 16th century.

==== Aldersgate Without ====
Aldersgate Without was, at an early date, part of an area outside the northern wall called the Soke of Cripplegate, held by the church of St. Martin's Le Grand. The Without division was coterminous with that part of the Ancient Parish of St Botolph Without Aldersgate that was part of the City. The area included the parish church of St Botolph's Aldersgate and the adjacent Postman's Park, named after the former principal sorting office in King Edward Street, and the location of the Memorial to Heroic Self Sacrifice.

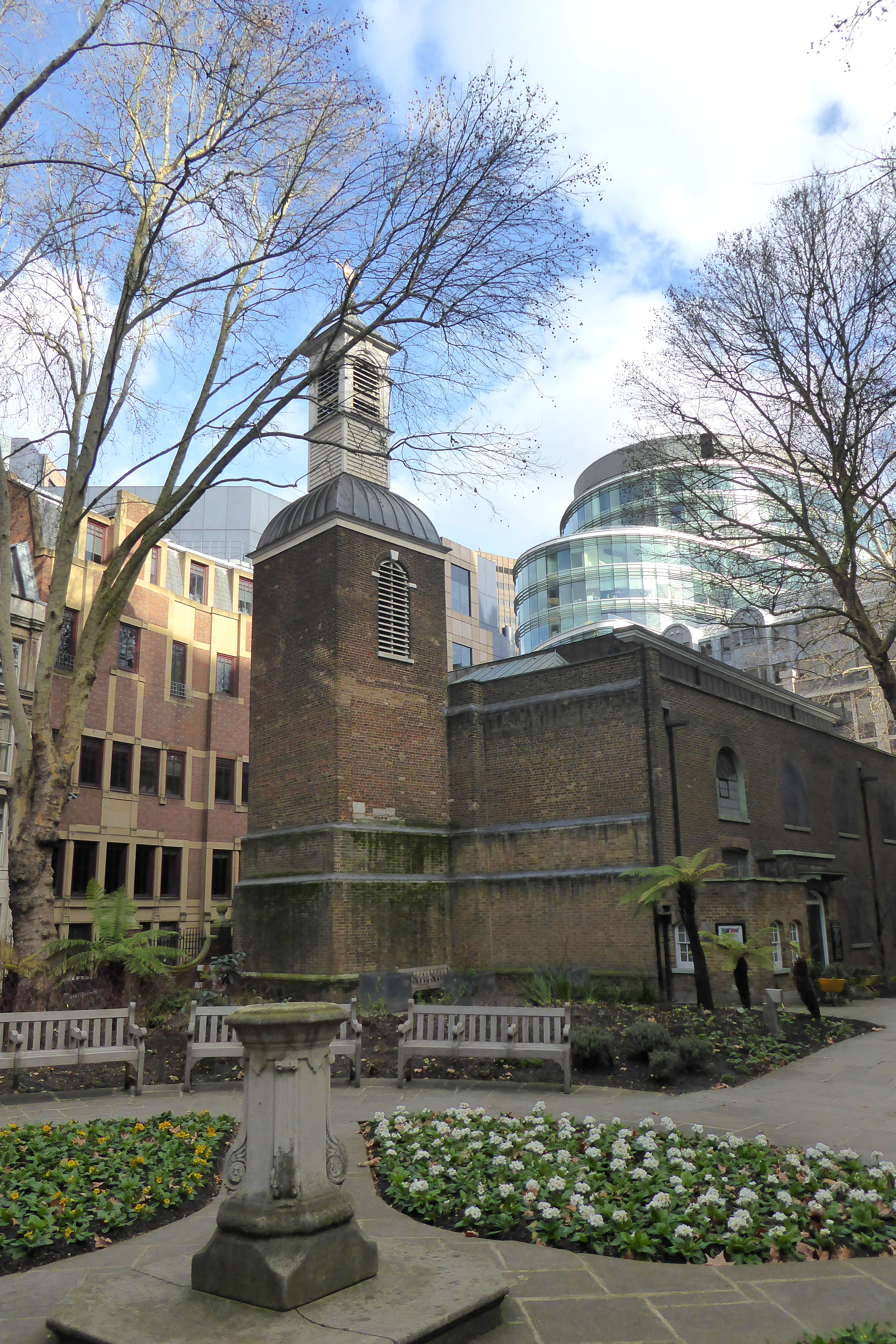
St Botolph's, Aldersgate as seen from Postman's Park

The church outside Aldersgate was one of four London churches dedicated to Saint Botolph, a 7th-century English saint. By the end of the 11th century Botolph was regarded as the patron saint of boundaries, and by extension of trade and travel.

The division was mainly focussed on the buildings on each side of Aldersgate street and included the western part of the Barbican Estate (including the Museum of London), two livery company halls (the Ironmongers' Hall and the Plaisterers' Hall) as well as 200 Aldersgate, a large office complex at the southern end of the street.

==== Post-2013 ward ====
Since ward boundary changes in 2013, almost all of the ward is Without and the former liberty and street of St. Martin's is no longer within the ward's boundaries.

The much-altered new ward of Aldersgate is bounded by Aldersgate Street, Beech Street, Noble Street, Angel Street, King Edward Street and Montague Street.

==== Aldersgate Street ====
Aldersgate Street forms a short section of the A1 route towards Edinburgh. It is located on the west side of the Barbican Estate and Barbican Centre, near St Bartholomew's Hospital and the Museum of London from its opening in 1976 until it closed in December 2022 prior to its move to Smithfield Market (during which time it fell within the ward).

Northbound it continues into Goswell Road at the junction with Fann Street; southbound it continues into St. Martin's Le Grand. Barbican Underground station is located on Aldersgate Street and when it was opened in 1865 was named Aldersgate Street tube station. In 1910 it was renamed Aldersgate, then Aldersgate & Barbican in 1924, before finally being renamed Barbican in 1968.

Originally Aldersgate Street only corresponded to the section starting from the church of St Botolph without Aldersgate towards Long Lane. The portion of the road from Long Lane till Goswell Street (after 1864 Goswell Road) was formerly named Pickax Street, where today is located the Barbican tube station. This name may derive from Pickt Hatch, an area of brothels said to be in this part of London during the Elizabethan era. Pick Hatch is mentioned in The Merry Wives of Windsor ("Goe ... to your Mannor of Pickt-hatch") and in The Alchemist ("The decay'd Vestalls of Pickt-hatch"). By the late eighteenth century the name Pickax was no more in use, and the road was fully incorporated into Aldersgate Street.

=== Politics ===
Aldersgate is one of 25 wards of the City of London, each electing an alderman to the Court of Aldermen and commoners (the City equivalent of a councillor) to the Court of Common Council of the City of London Corporation. Only electors who are Freemen of the City of London are eligible to stand.

In the 2017 City-wide Common Council elections, the Labour Party won one seat in Aldersgate ward with local resident Richard Crossan standing for Labour and being elected unopposed. The Labour Party won a record total of five seats on the Common Council in March 2017 winning two seats in Portsoken, two seats in Cripplegate ward and one seat in Aldersgate ward.

Current elected representatives in Aldersgate, following the 2022 Common Council election and Aldermanic election are Christopher Makin (Alderman), Randall Anderson (Deputy), Naresh Sonpar, Steve Goodman, Helen Fentiman, Deborah Oliver and Anett Ridegg.

=== History ===
The wards of London appear to have taken shape in the 11th century, before the Norman Conquest. Their administrative, judicial and military purpose made them equivalent to Hundreds in the countryside. The primary purpose of wards like Aldersgate, which included a gate, appears to be the defence of the gate, as gates were the weakest points in any fortification.

The ward initially only included land within the walls, but a degree of growth beyond the gate meant some of the land beyond came under the sway of the City. Boundary markers – bars – were established here and elsewhere with the suburb eventually becoming part of the City. Aldersgate Bars are recorded as early as 1197.

A mansion above Aldersgate, referred to as Aldrichgate, was gifted to John Blytone, the earliest known sword-bearer of the City of London when he resigned from the service of the Lord Mayor of London in 1395.

==== Religion ====
In 1554, Aldersgate Street was the scene of a fraud where Elizabeth Crofts was smuggled into a wall to pretend to be a heavenly voice. Reputedly 17,000 people came to listen to her give out anti-Catholic propaganda.

The house of Sarah Sawyer, in Rose and Rainbow Court (approximately the site of the present Museum of London), formed one of the earliest Quaker meetings in London (before 1655). In 1675, it became a dedicated meeting house, the Box Meeting, used mainly by Quaker women for poor relief, on her marriage.

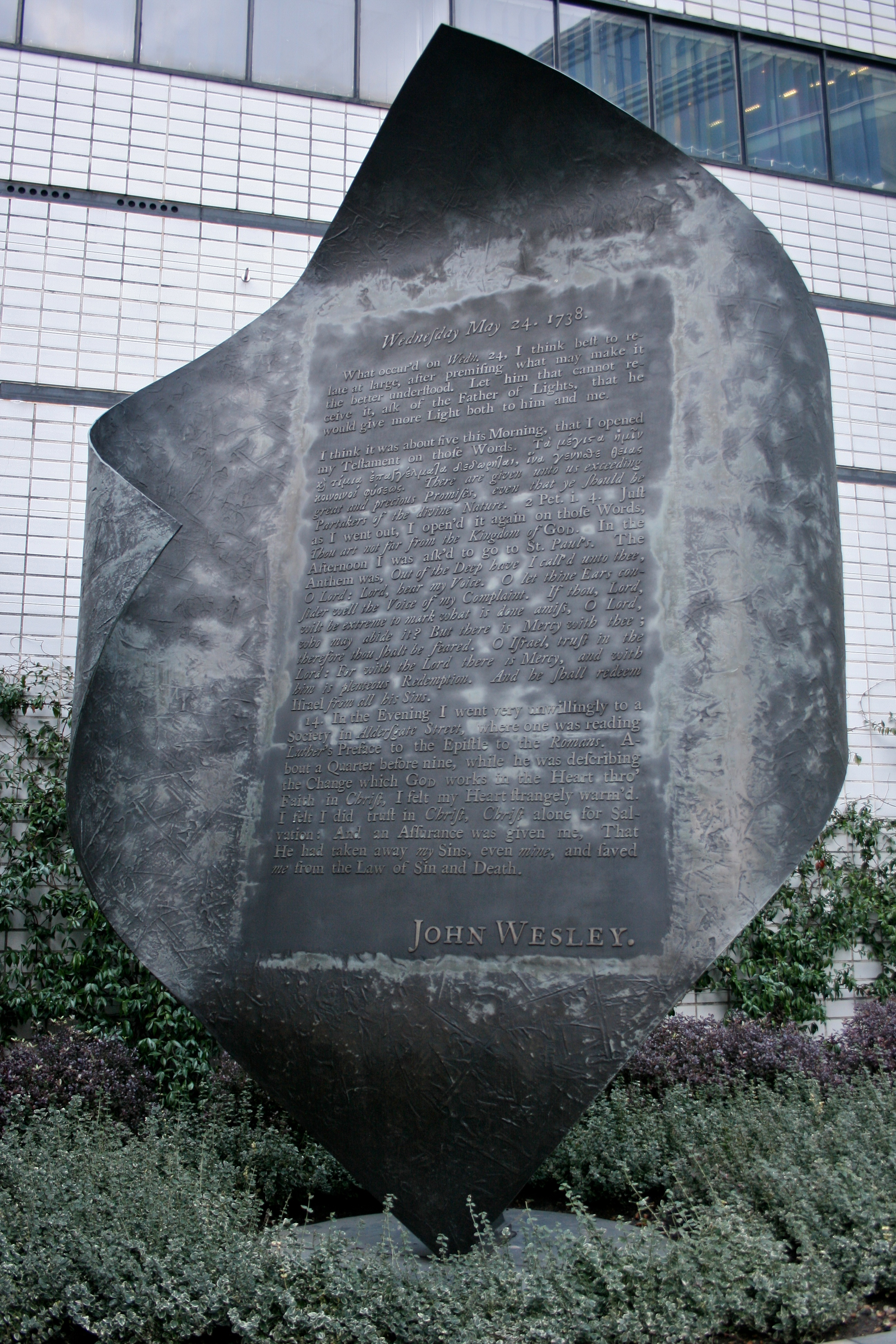
Memorial at Aldersgate commemorating John Wesley's religious experience

The property at 28 Aldersgate Street is the approximate former location of a Moravian Church. On (24 May 1738) / May 24, 1738, while attending a meeting at the church, the Anglican clergyman John Wesley underwent a profound religious experience that he described as a "warming of the heart". The following year, he left the Moravians and founded the Methodist Society of England. The yearly anniversary of his experience is celebrated by Methodists on Aldersgate Day. Wesley's Chapel, in nearby City Road, remains a major focal point of the worldwide Methodist charismatic movement. Aldersgate Renewal Ministries (ARM) is a global movement where people may experience their own Pentecost, pray for healing, pray God's will in a heavenly language unknown to the speaker (tongues), encounter and pray with the Holy Spirit using spiritual / charismatic gifts that are listed in 1 Corinthians 12 of the Holy Bible. Working with churches in the Wesleyan heritage (including the United Methodist Church), people encounter the Holy Spirit, and are encouraged to live supernatural, Holy Spirit-filled lives. ARM teaches people today of the rich Wesleyan heritage and history, recognizing that John Wesley's theology of grace is in fact a theology of the Holy Spirit.

==== The arts ====
The poet Thomas Flatman was born in a house in Aldersgate Street in 1633. As with most historic buildings on this stretch of road, the building no longer stands. At Nos. 35-38 stood Shaftesbury House, built around 1644 by Inigo Jones. It was demolished in 1882. Lauderdale House was demolished in 1708, the London home of the Duke of Lauderdale and earlier the house of his mother-in-law, the Countess of Home.

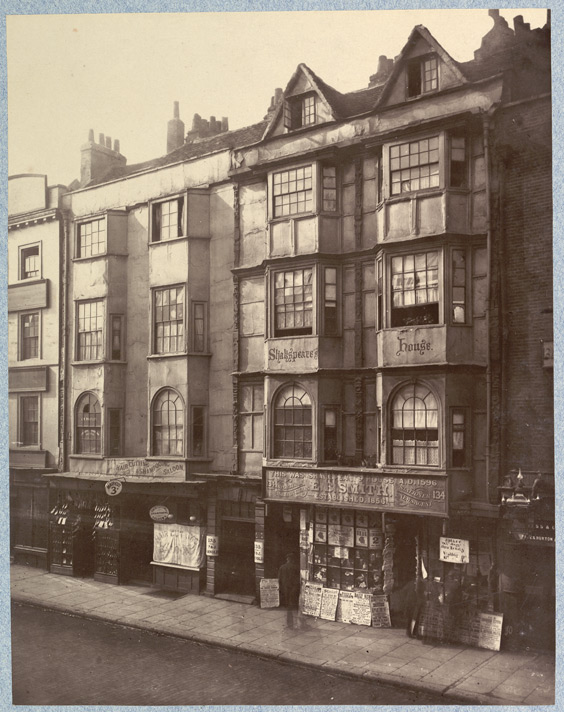
134 Aldersgate Street, Shakespeare's House - demolished in 1879

No. 134 for many years had a sign claiming: "This was Shakespeare's House". Although the building was very close to the nearby Fortune Playhouse, there is no documentary evidence surviving to indicate that Shakespeare resided here; a subsidy roll from 1598 shows a "William Shakespeare" as owner of the property, but there is nothing to indicate that it is the playwright. The building no longer exists, and Barbican station now occupies the site. The nearby Shakespeare Tower is named for this (tenuous) connection. At the point where Aldersgate Street changes its name to Goswell Road there is also a public house "The Shakespeare".

==== Lost buildings ====
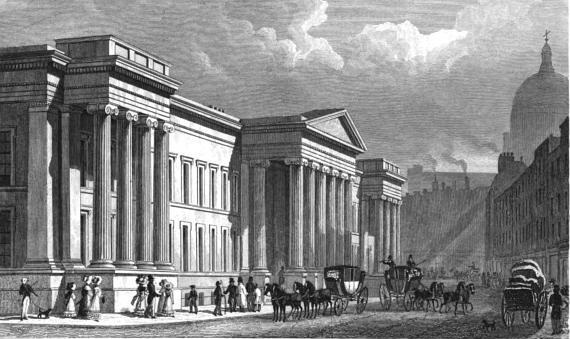
General Post Office, late 1820s.

Adjacent to the modern roundabout on the site of the gate was the former headquarters of the General Post Office (closed in 1910 and demolished shortly afterwards), and the adjoining Postman's Park. The southern part of the roundabout and the northern part of where the Post Office once stood are located on the site of a collegiate church and sanctuary founded in 750 by Withu, King of Kent, hugely expanded in 1056 by Ingebrian, Earl of Essex, and issued with a royal charter in 1068 by William the Conqueror. The site of the church was cleared in 1818 in preparation for the construction of the Post Office.

Most of the buildings on Aldersgate Street were destroyed or badly damaged in the Second World War. The entire length of the eastern side of the street is now occupied by a part of the 40-acre (16 ha) Barbican residential and arts complex.

At the corner in between Aldersgate Street and Long Lane, opposite to the now Barbican station and Beech Street, stood the "Manchester Hotel" with over 240 rooms. It used to be a Victorian landmark in the area, popular with business men, visitors and juries attending trials at the Old Bailey. Opened in 1879 and refurbished and modernised in 1921, it suffered severe damage by the Second World War bombs and was consequently demolished. After the First World War it was temporary closed and commandeered by the government as a hostel for Jewish refugees escaping Poland and Belgium. Advertisement of the hotel regularly featured on local magazines and periodicals referring to its splendid rooms, wine cellar, luncheon for City workers, and as a venue for wedding receptions.

== See also ==
- Aldgate
- List of demolished buildings and structures in London
- Fortifications of London
- London
- City gate
- City wall

== Image gallery ==
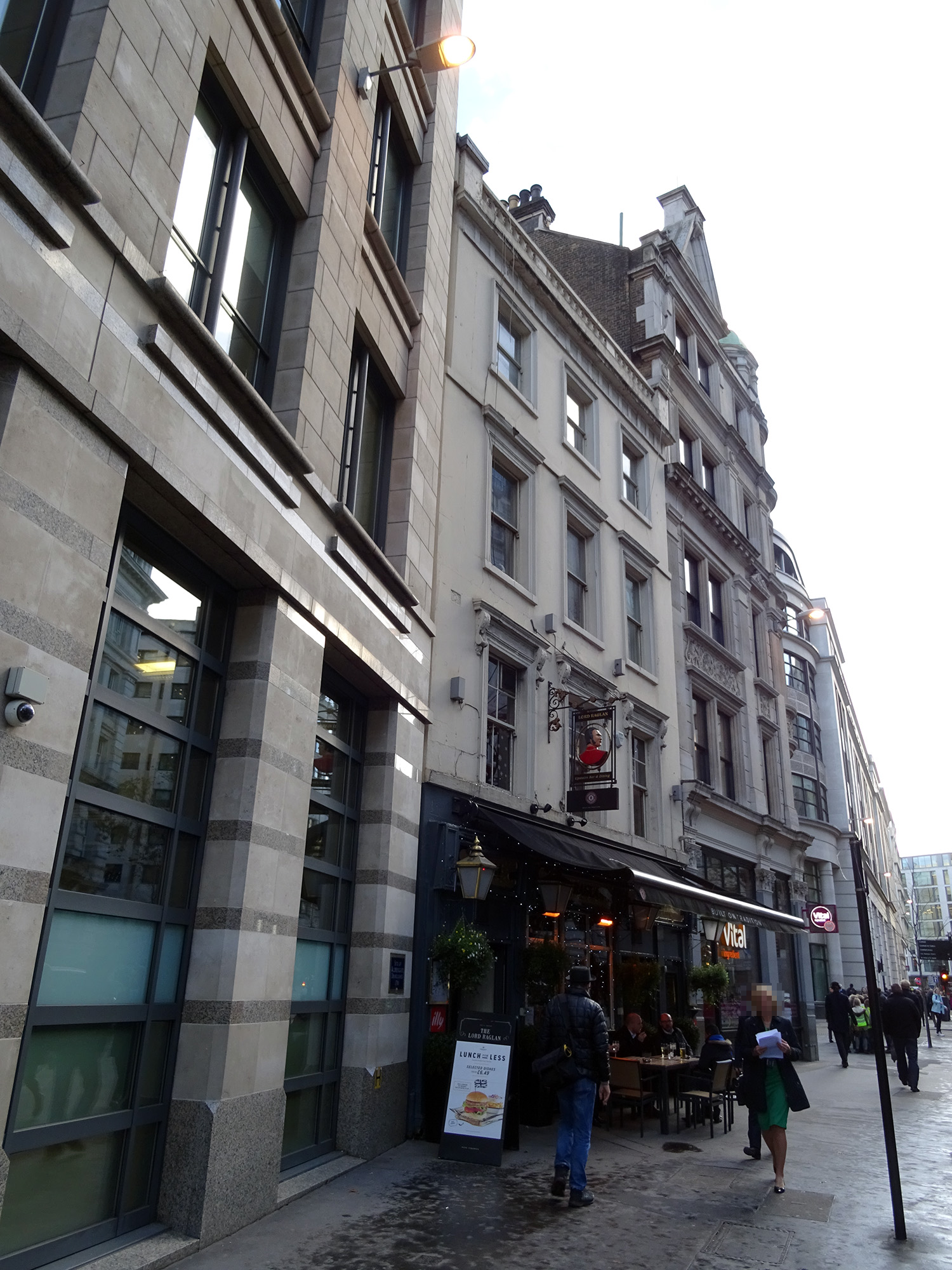
Site of Aldersgate

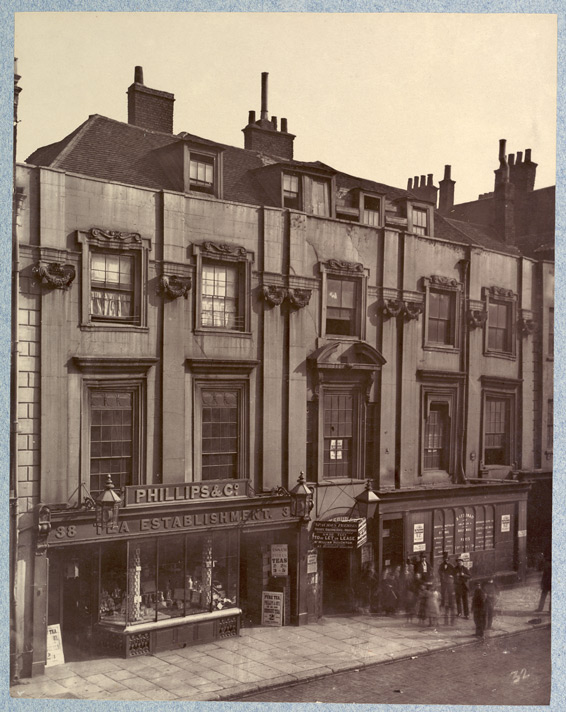
ShaftesburyHouse - demolished in 1882

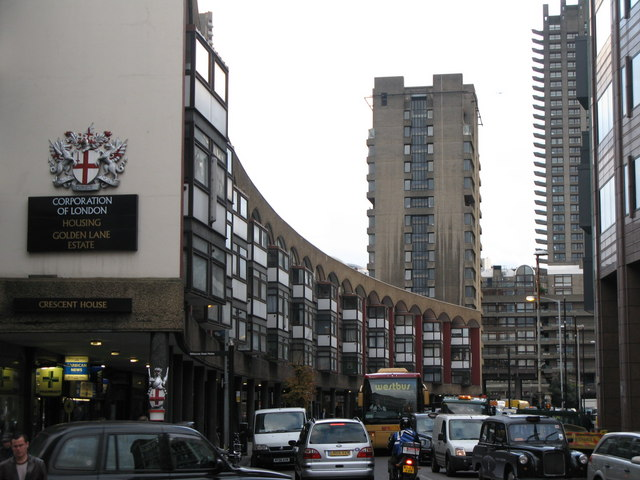
Aldersgate Street

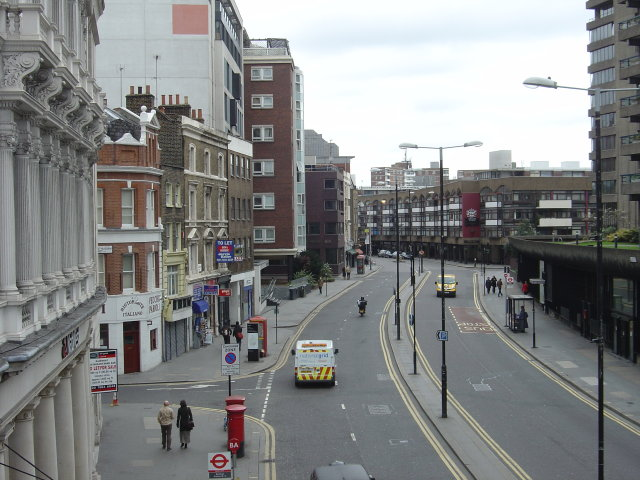
Aldersgate Street, north side from the Barbican highwalk

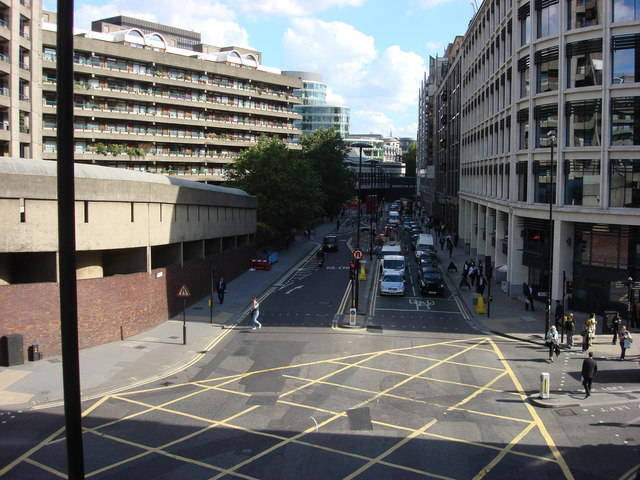
Aldersgate Street, south side from the Barbican highwalk

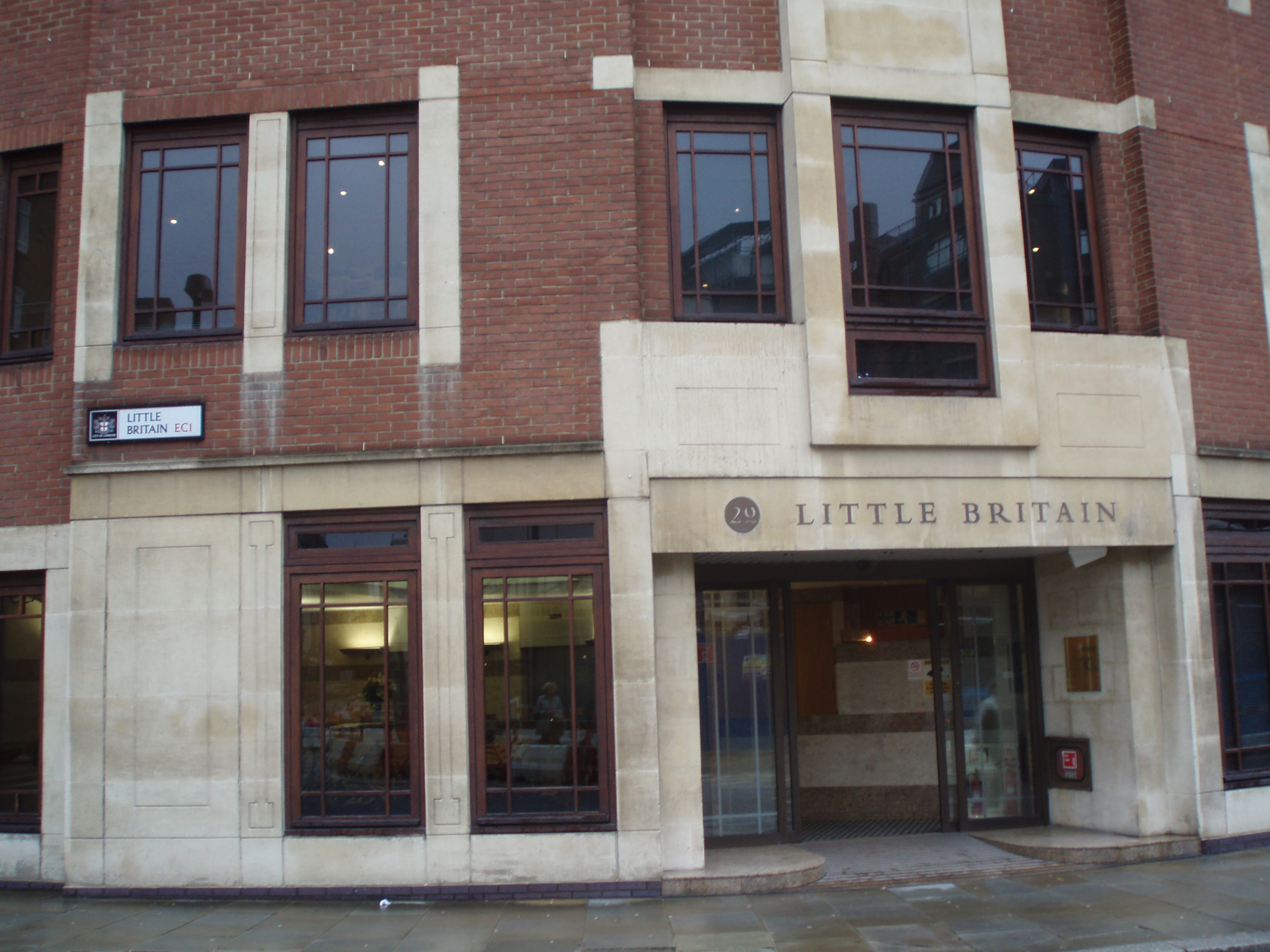
Little Britain, a street in the ward

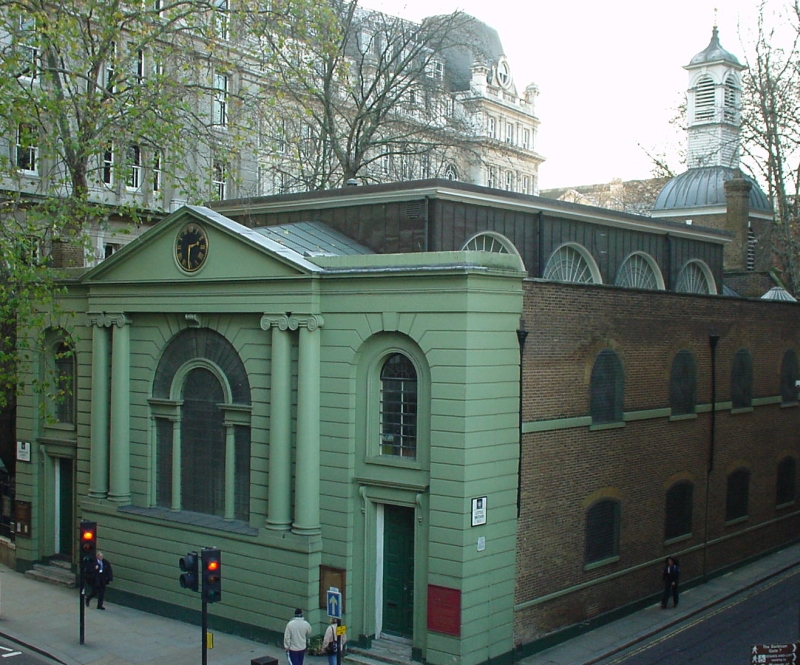
St Botolph-without-Aldersgate Church

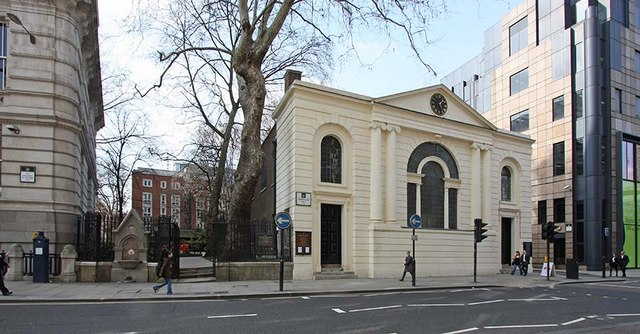
St Botolph-without-Aldersgate Church after redecoration

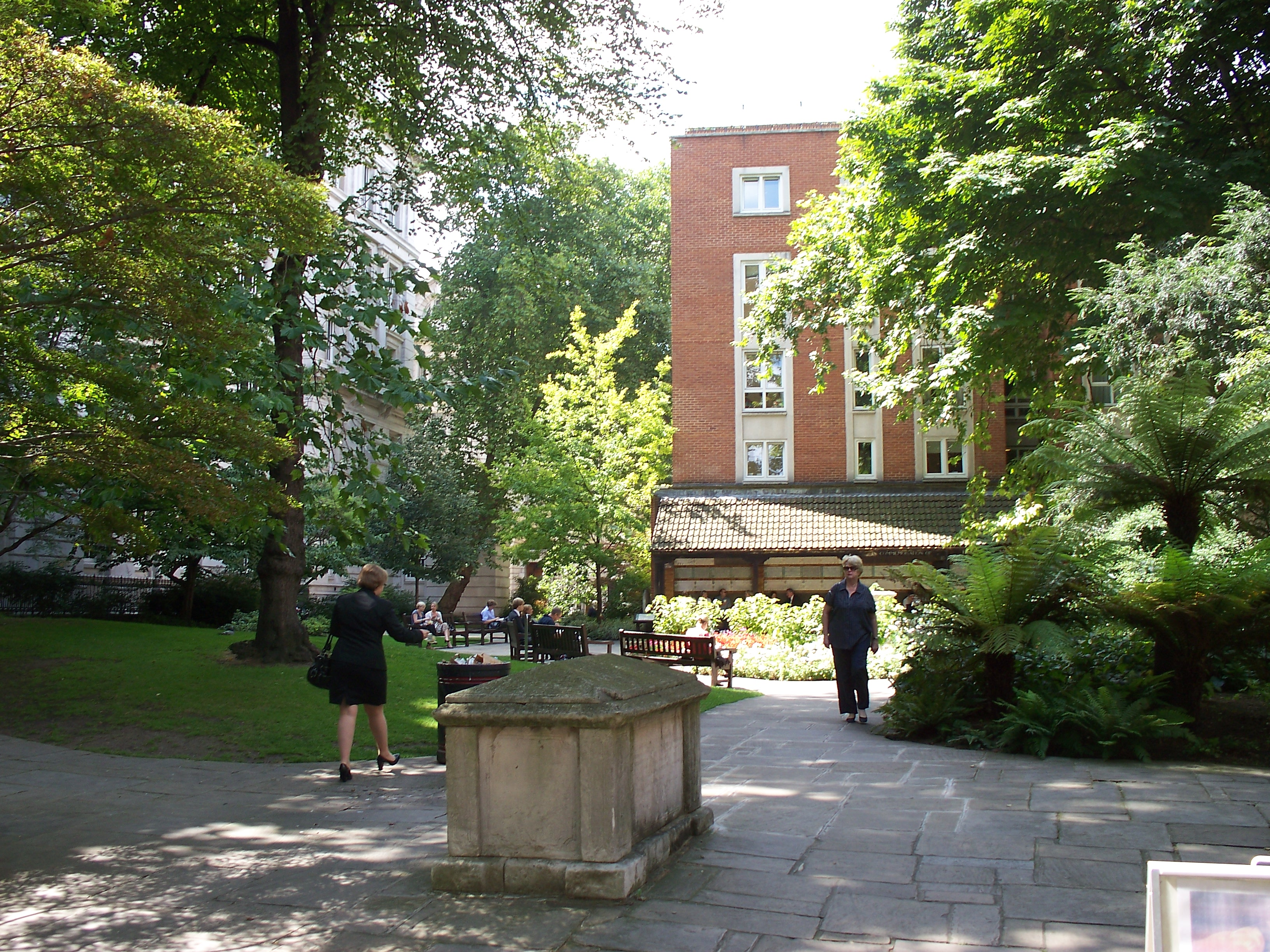
Postman's Park from Aldersgate Street

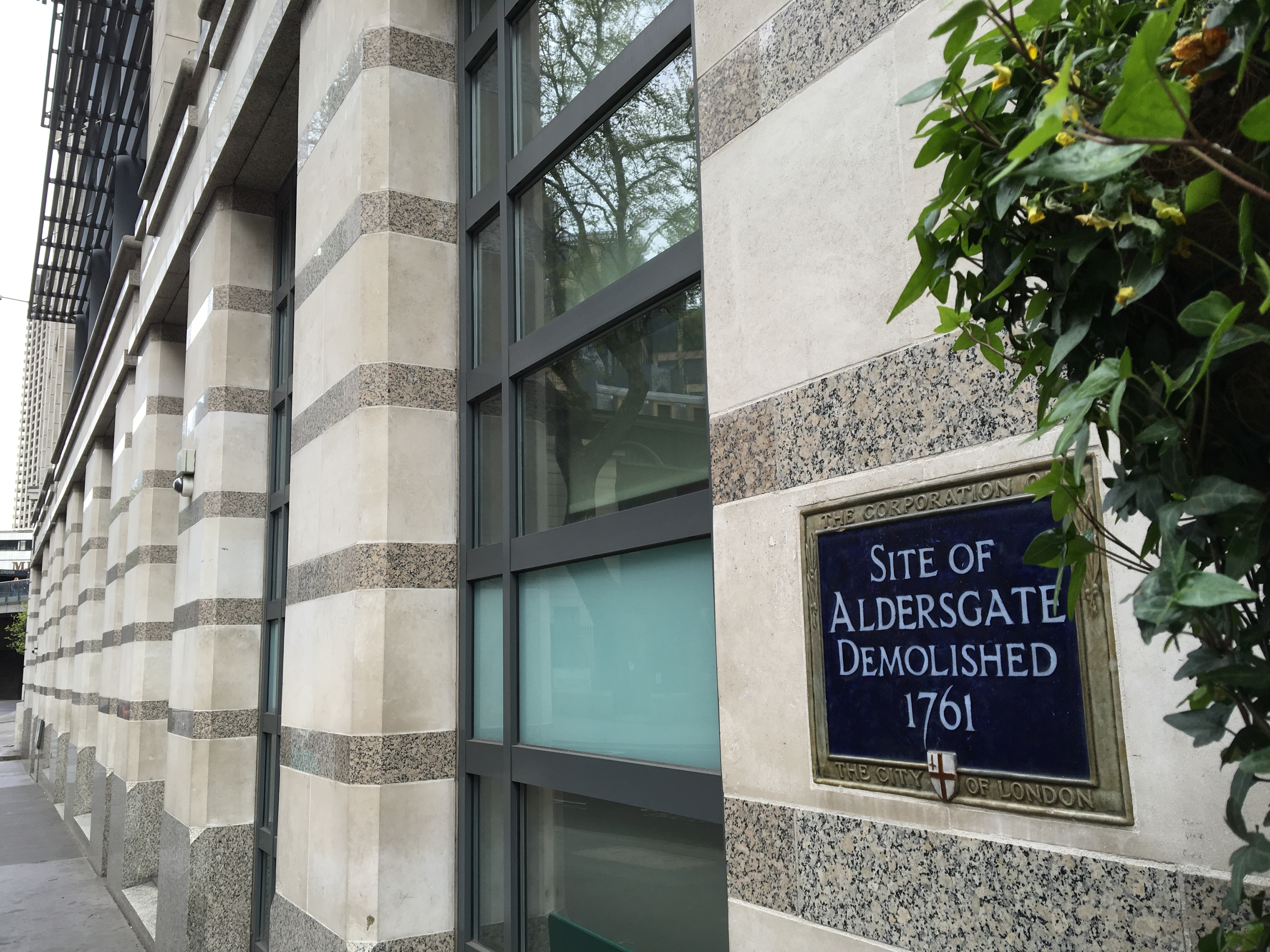
Aldersgate plaque

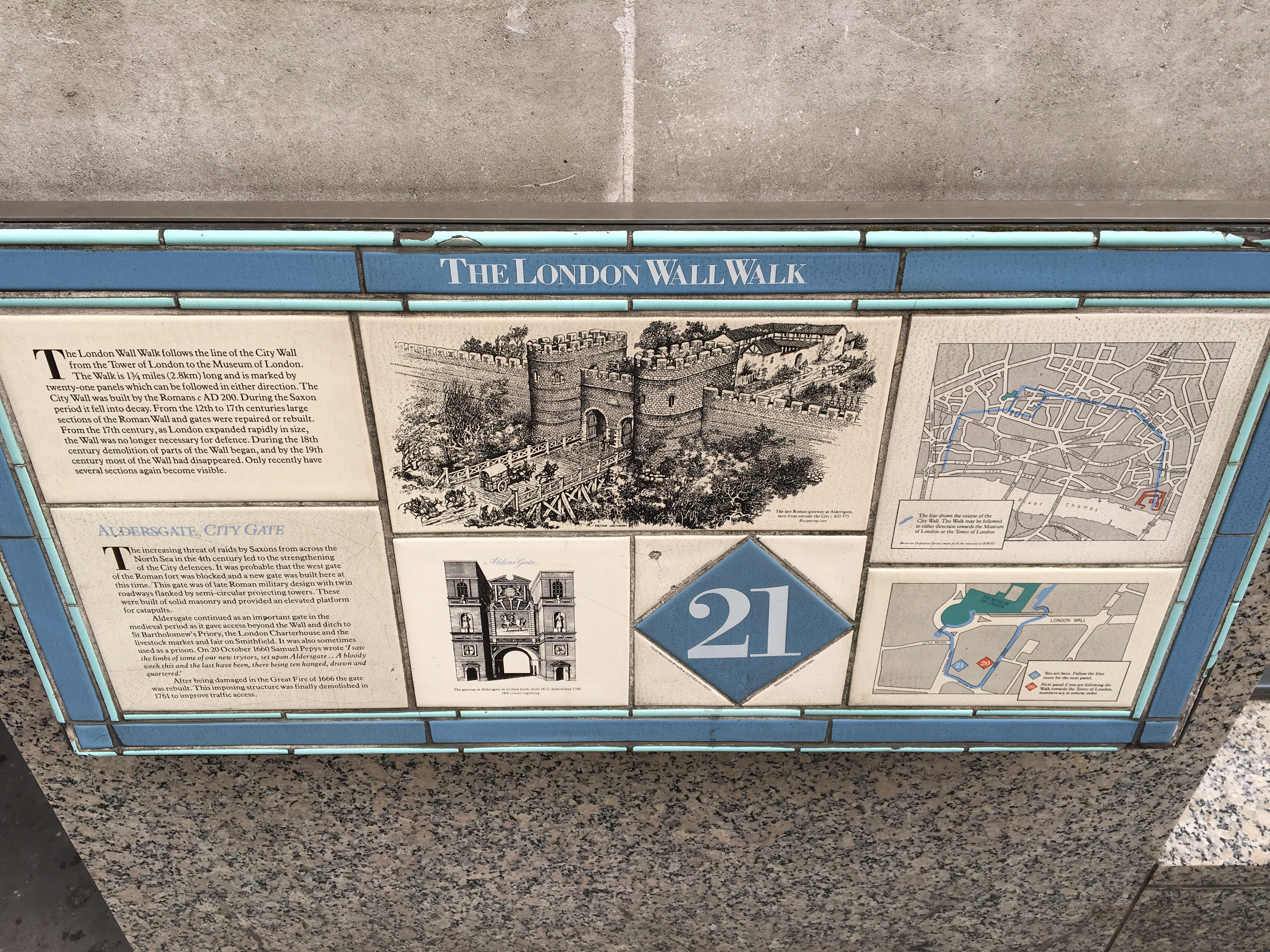
Aldersgate history

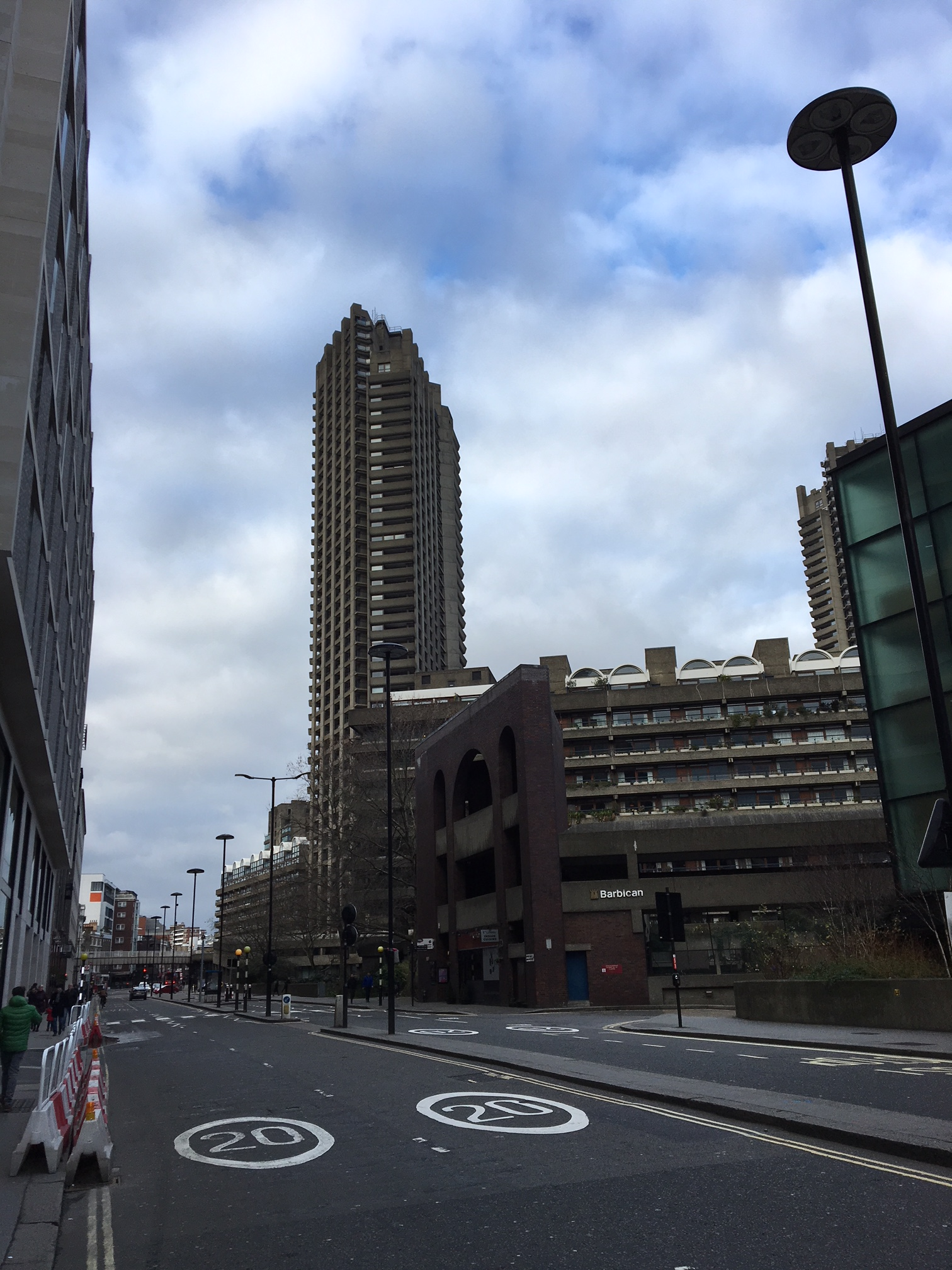
Aldersgate street view

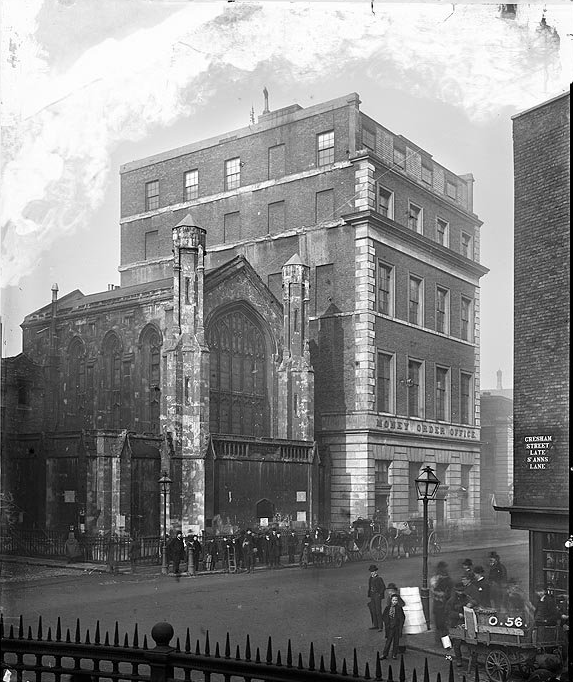
No. 1 Aldersgate Street (the Money Order Office) (right) and the French Protestant Chapel in St Martin's Le Grand (left) (both demolished 1888).
