= The Sword of the Lictor =

1982 science fiction novel by Gene Wolfe

- First edition
- Author: Gene Wolfe
- Cover artist: Don Maitz
- Language: English
- Series: The Book of the New Sun
- Genre: Science fiction, High fantasy
- Publisher: Timescape Books
- Publication date: 1982
- Publication place: United States
- Media type: Print (Hardcover & Paperback)
- Pages: 302
- Award: Locus Award for Best Fantasy Novel (1983)
- ISBN: 0-671-43595-7
- Preceded by: The Claw of the Conciliator
- Followed by: The Citadel of the Autarch

The Sword of the Lictor is a science fantasy novel by American writer Gene Wolfe. First released in 1982, it is the third volume in the four-volume series The Book of the New Sun.

== Plot introduction ==
The book continues the story of Severian, a lictor in the Seekers for Truth and Penitence, describing his time as a torturer in the city Thrax and then his travels after soon leaving Thrax.

== Plot summary ==
Having completed the journey he was sent upon when he was exiled from the Citadel, Severian takes up his position as the Lictor (or Master of Chains) of the city of Thrax. His lover Dorcas falls into depression, in part because of her position as the partner of a reviled and feared figure in a strange city. She is also becoming increasingly upset by her mysterious past, and convinced that she must unravel its secrets, however disturbing they may turn out to be.

Escaping an exotic creature that incinerates things, which seems to have come to Thrax to find him, Severian finds himself again showing mercy to a condemned prisoner and is forced to flee the city. He and Dorcas separate, and he journeys alone into the mountains in search of the Pelerines, whom he believes to be the rightful keepers of the priceless relic which he carries, the Claw of the Conciliator.

On the road, he battles his enemy Agia, an Alzabo—a beast which acquires the memories of those it consumes—and a gang of men who have opted to become as animals. In the wake of this violence, he takes an orphaned boy, little Severian, into his care. They encounter a village of men who claim to be sorcerers, and who possess more power than Severian at first believes. Escaping amidst the threat that yet another dangerous creature has been set upon his trail, Severian discovers a monarch from the past, Typhon, in an ancient city. Typhon tries to manipulate Severian during a complex confrontation. Little Severian is killed.

Continuing his journey, Severian is drawn into a local conflict on the side of a group of islanders being enslaved. He then discovers that his old companions Dr. Talos and Baldanders are the enslavers, and is forced to battle the giant Baldanders.

In the wake of this battle, in which his sword and the Claw are both (at least apparently, in the latter case) destroyed, Severian seeks to digest a series of revelations: about the nature of Baldanders, the nature of the aliens who manipulate events on Urth yet profess to be his friends, and the nature of the Claw which he carried for so long. As he does so, he finds himself approaching the edge of the war in the North.

== Awards ==
In 1983 The Sword of the Lictor won the Locus Award for Best Fantasy Novel and the August Derleth Award, and was nominated for the Nebula in 1982 and Hugo in 1983.
