= Elizabeth Crofts =

English impostor

Elizabeth Crofts was an English imposter known for her involvement in one event in 1554 known as "the bird in the wall". Reports indicate that Crofts, a serving maid, was paid or volunteered to pretend to be a heavenly messenger against the marriage of Mary I of England and Philip II of Spain. She was smuggled into a hollow wall on Aldersgate Street where she declaimed disinformation regarding the Queen, her marriage and Catholicism whilst her accomplices moved amongst the crowd interpreting and encouraging it. Within 24 hours they had reputedly gathered a crowd of 17,000 people. It is thought that Sir Anthony Knyvett may have been involved.

After the wall had been knocked down, Crofts was arrested and revealed her story. Some of her accomplices were arrested and punished but generally it was felt that Crofts was not responsible for her actions.
