= The Identity Matrix =

1982 science fiction novel by Jack L. Chalker

- First edition cover
- Author: Jack L. Chalker
- Language: English
- Genre: Science fiction
- Publisher: Timescape Books
- Publication date: July, 1982
- Publication place: United States
- Media type: Print (Paperback)
- ISBN: 0-671-44481-6

The Identity Matrix is a science fiction novel by American writer Jack L. Chalker, published in 1982 by Timescape Books. The work focuses on the body swap and enemy mine plot devices, as well as a background conflict between two powerful alien races.
