= The Dragon Waiting =

1983 novel by John M. Ford

- Author: John M. Ford
- Language: English
- Genre: Historical fantasy
- Publisher: Timescape Books
- Publication date: 1983
- Publication place: United States
- Media type: Print (hardcover, paperback)
- Pages: 365
- ISBN: 0-671-47552-5

The Dragon Waiting: A Masque of History is a 1983 historical fantasy novel by American writer John M. Ford. It won the 1984 World Fantasy Award for Best Novel. This book, set in an alternate history, contains such plot elements as vampirism, the House of Medici, and the convoluted English politics surrounding Edward IV and Richard III. It also deals with the fate of the Princes in the Tower.

== Plot summary ==
Edward IV is on the throne of England, but in this world, medieval Europe is dominated by the threat from the Byzantine Empire. During the 4th century CE, Julian the Apostate reigned longer than he did in our world, succeeded in displacing Christianity and reintroduced religious pluralism within the Roman Empire, resulting in the subsequent disappearance of Islam as well. Without any cohesive threat from the east, presumably Byzantium was able to survive, consolidate its authority and expand.

Sforza, the Vampire Duke, marshals his forces for his long-planned attack on Florence, and Byzantium is on the march. Gregory, a mercenary; Dimi, the exiled heir to the Byzantine throne; Cynthia, a young physician forced to flee Florence; and Hywel, a Welsh wizard, nephew of Owain Gly Dwr, seem to have no common goals but together they wage an intrigue-filled campaign against the might of Byzantium, striving to secure the English throne for Richard, Duke of Gloucester, and make him Richard III.

This succeeds, and Richard III goes on to win the Battle of Bosworth in this alternate universe, killing Henry Tudor and ensuring that he never becomes Henry VII as he did in the reality. At that point, the book ends.

== Meaning of the title ==
Neil Gaiman has noted that the book "contains no dragons, or rather, the dragon of the title is Wales."

== Reception ==
In 1985, Gaiman reviewed The Dragon Waiting for Imagine magazine, and called it "a complex and brilliant work, serious, funny, and highly entertaining," recommending that readers buy it despite the cover art.

In 1995 Ford reported its sales as "40,000 copies in print (six thousand in hardcover) in English, about 10K more in the foreign editions".

The novel won the 1984 World Fantasy Award for Best Novel.

Jo Walton praised it as "a brilliantly written, absorbing book with great characters", lauding Ford for having convincingly portrayed "a feudal world without Christianity", and emphasizing that it is a book "written by [an American] and set in Britain ... where the geography works and the scale of the landscape feels right." Graham Sleight observed that it is "probably the most plotted of Ford's books", and that it "makes [the] most allowance for readers who may not be expecting the filigree intricacy of [Ford's] stories.

== Editions ==
- 1983, Timescape Books, ISBN 0-671-47552-5
- 1985, Avon Books, ISBN 0-380-69887-0 cover by Sanjulián
- 2002, Gollancz (#29 in Fantasy Masterworks line), ISBN 0-575-07378-0
- 2020, Tor Books, ISBN 978-1250794802 hardcover, ISBN 978-1250269010 paperback, e-book.
