= The Years of the City =

1984 novel by Frederik Pohl

Cover of the first edition, published by Timescape Books. Art by Howard Koslow.

The Years of the City is a science fiction novel by American writer Frederik Pohl, published in 1984.

== Plot summary ==
The novel is composed by five connected stories, describing an utopia being built in New York City.

== Reception ==
Dave Langford reviewed The Years of the City for White Dwarf #64, and stated that "There are corny elements (like the traditional whores and crooks with hearts of gold in story 1) and things I can't believe; but overall it's impressive, with enough 'realistic' bitterness to make us cynics swallow the sugary core of optimism."

Wendy Graham reviewed The Years of the City for Adventurer magazine and stated that "If this is the future, it's not so bad, and I liked the book too."

== Reviews ==
- Review by Dan Chow (1984) in Locus, #281 June 1984
- Review by Patricia Hernlund (1985) in Fantasy Review, January 1985
- Review by Robert Coulson (1985) in Amazing Stories, March 1985
- Review by Algis Budrys (1985) in The Magazine of Fantasy & Science Fiction, March 1985
- Review by Tom Easton (1985) in Analog Science Fiction/Science Fact, April 1985
- Review by Kenny Mathieson (1985) in Foundation, #35 Winter 1985/1986, (1986)
