= John Blytone =

Sword-bearer of the City of London

John Blytone was the first known sword-bearer of the City of London, a position he resigned in 1395. In 1384 he was arrested and King Richard II wrote to the Lord Mayor of London Nicholas Brembre and the Sheriffs of the City of London on 14 June, and to Brembre again on 15 June, "bidding them deliver Robert Cumbertone and John Blytone, who had been arrested in London, to Edmund Tettesworth and Thomas Hore, the King's Serjeants-at-arms, to conduct to Corfe Castle, as their continued presence in London was likely to cause a disturbance, as it had done on a former occasion." He was granted the "Gate of Aldrichgate" (the mansion over Aldersgate) for life when he resigned in 1395.
