= Timescape Books =

Defunct American specialty publishing imprint

- Parent company: Pocket Books
- Status: Defunct
- Founded: 1981
- Founder: David G. Hartwell
- Country of origin: United States
- Headquarters location: New York City
- Publication types: books
- Fiction genres: science fiction

Timescape Books was a science fiction line from Pocket Books operating from 1981 to 1985. Pocket Books is an imprint of Simon & Schuster.

It was named after the Gregory Benford novel Timescape, which was not published by the Timescape imprint. The imprint was founded by David G. Hartwell. It published both original hardcover and reprinted mass market paperback novels. Many of the imprint's titles were nominees or winners of Hugo and Nebula awards, along with other major SF awards. It published more than 30 original hardcover works and over 100 paperback titles, but the imprint was not financially successful enough for the parent company at the time, as it was not producing major bestsellers.

== Select bibliography ==
- Golem^{100}, Alfred Bester (1981 reprint), ISBN 0-671-82047-8
- Oath of Fealty, Larry Niven and Jerry Pournelle (1981), ISBN 0-671-22695-9
- Windhaven, George R. R. Martin and Lisa Tuttle (1981), ISBN 0-671-25277-1
- The War Hound and the World's Pain, Michael Moorcock (1981), ISBN 0-671-43708-9
- The City of the Singing Flame, Clark Ashton Smith (1981), ISBN 0-671-83415-0
- The Sword of the Lictor, Gene Wolfe (1981), ISBN 0-671-43595-7
- The Claw of the Conciliator, Gene Wolfe (1981), ISBN 0-671-41370-8 (Nebula Award)
- The Divine Invasion, Philip K. Dick (1981), ISBN 0-671-41776-2
- The Prince of Morning Bells, Nancy Kress (1981)
- No Enemy But Time, Michael Bishop (1982), ISBN 0-671-44973-7 (Hugo Award)
- The Transmigration of Timothy Archer, Philip K. Dick (1982), ISBN 0-671-44066-7
- Courtship Rite, Donald Kingsbury (1982), ISBN 0-671-44033-0
- Roadside Picnic, Arkady and Boris Strugatsky (1982 reprint), ISBN 0-671-45842-6
- The Identity Matrix, Jack L. Chalker (1982), ISBN 0-671-65547-7
- The Red Magician, Lisa Goldstein (1982)
- A Rose for Armageddon, Hilbert Schenck (1982)
- Orion Shall Rise, Poul Anderson (1983), ISBN 0-671-46492-2
- Frost, Robin Wayne Bailey (1983), ISBN 0-671-45596-6
- Cugel's Saga, Jack Vance (1983), ISBN 0-671-49450-3
- A Matter for Men, David Gerrold (1983), ISBN 0-671-46493-0
- The Dragon Waiting: A Masque of History, John M. Ford (1983), ISBN 0-671-47552-5
- The Citadel of the Autarch, Gene Wolfe (1983), ISBN 0-671-45251-7
- Blooded on Arachne, Michael Bishop (1983 reprint), ISBN 0-671-41319-8
- Unicorn Variations, Roger Zelazny (1983), ISBN 0-671-49449-X
- Against Infinity, Gregory Benford (1983), ISBN 0-671-45901-5
- Across the Sea of Suns, Gregory Benford (1984), ISBN 0-671-44668-1
- The Flight of the Dragonfly, Robert L. Forward (1984), ISBN 0-671-49939-4
- The Years of the City, Frederik Pohl (1984)
