= Sword of justice =

Ceremonial sword

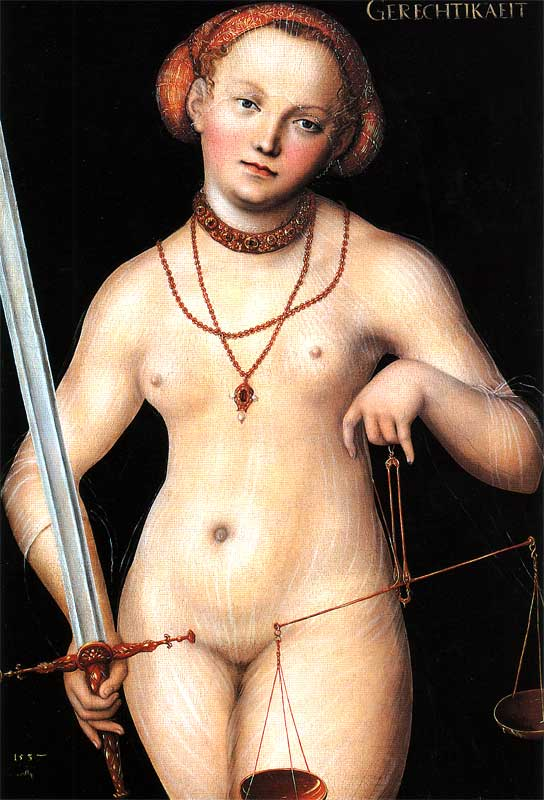
A sword-wielding allegory of justice, painted by Lucas Cranach the Elder in 1537

A sword of justice is a ceremonial sword that is used to signify a monarch's supreme judicial power. In some cases, this may have been an executioner's sword that was no longer used for executions, becoming instead a ceremonial one.

The Crown Jewels of the United Kingdom include two swords of justice: the sharply pointed Sword of Temporal Justice and the obliquely pointed Sword of Spiritual Justice, whose characteristics are said to indicate that only temporal courts have power over death. The current two swords, together with Curtana, the Sword of Mercy, were made for coronation of Charles I of England, which took place in 1626.
