= The Urth of the New Sun =

1987 science fiction novel by Gene Wolfe

- First edition (UK)
- Author: Gene Wolfe
- Cover artist: Peter Goodfellow
- Language: English
- Genre: Science fiction
- Publisher: Gollancz (UK); Tor Books (US)
- Publication date: Aug 1987 (UK); Sep 1987 (US)
- Publication place: United Kingdom
- Media type: Print (hardback & paperback)
- Pages: 372 pp
- ISBN: 0-575-04116-1
- OCLC: 16003956
- Dewey Decimal: 813/.54 19
- LC Class: PS3573.O52 U78 1987
- Preceded by: The Book of the New Sun

The Urth of the New Sun is a 1987 science fiction novel by Gene Wolfe that serves as a coda to his four-volume Book of the New Sun series. Like Book of the New Sun, it is of the Dying Earth subgenre. It was nominated for the Hugo Award for Best Novel, Locus Award for Best Science Fiction Novel and the Nebula Award for Best Novel in 1988.

Urth of the New Sun picks up the tale of Severian, the protagonist of Book of the New Sun, years after that work's end. He leaves his role as Autarch of Urth to seek a new sun for Urth.

== Plot summary ==
Unlike The Book of the New Sun, The Urth of the New Sun mostly takes place outside Urth. The book is a continuation of Severian's narration of the aftermath of his ascent to the throne and subsequent journey "between the suns" to be judged and win back the fountain of life that will rejuvenate the slowly dying sun and revive life on Urth. When the book begins, Severian has already rewritten his accounts of before and is beginning his new log aboard the spaceship that will take him to Yesod, an enigmatic planet, home to the godlike beings who have the power to revitalize Urth and its sun.

Aboard the ship, Severian meets Zak, a mysterious being, who begins small and soon develops human form and turns out to be the all-powerful Tzadkiel of Yesod. Once in Yesod, Severian faces an immense task of facing all the deceased people he has encountered since his childhood, including Thecla and Master Malrubius. When he faces the tribunal to be judged by Tzadkiel, he is told that the trial was already successfully passed. Severian is made the New Sun.

After his return to Urth from Yesod, he finds the sun still dying, and that the New Sun is still very far, far away, but nevertheless moving relentlessly. He learns that many years have passed backwards. He also learns that he possesses healing power that he once attributed the Claw of the Conciliator and is taken as a prisoner into the Citadel, where he tells a story to his followers to comfort them. A prisoner in the next cell writes it down as The Book of the New Sun, the holy text of the Church of the Conciliator. He encounters the first Autarch Ymar and an earlier version of Typhon, who attempts to kill him. He manages to escape via the Corridors of Time. There, with the aid of a version of Tzadkiel, he travels back to the future. In his palace he finds his wife Valeria sitting on the throne attended by his old rival Baldanders (who has grown enough to match the size of an undine). Shortly after Severian reveals himself, an apocalyptic flood washes away the citadel and much of the land of Urth, thus bringing destruction and rebirth.

Severian travels as far into the past as he can and a primitive tribe accepts him as their divine king Apu-Punchau. After teaching and helping them for decades, he finally decides to leave, but is then killed by the tribe in their panic. He wakes inside a tomb and is once again accompanied by the Hierodules Ossipago, Barbatus and Famulimus, as well as the dead body of Apu-Punchau. It is revealed that Severian is an eidolon, a ghost-like being become material, and that he actually died on Tzadkiel's ship.

Once more, Severian flees through the Corridors of Time. Urth, now called Ushas, has recovered from the flood. A priest recognizes Severian as the Sleeper, one of their gods, and then leads him to where the other gods sleep as the novel ends.

== Reception ==
Dave Langford reviewed The Urth of the New Sun for White Dwarf #95, and stated that "Light is cast on minor points like the origin of the Claw, or Severian's link with the bygone demigod Apu-Punchau, but the old enigmas remain. Fascinating and infuriating."

Kirkus Reviews considered it to be "brilliantly inventive, dense, demanding" and "intellectually stunning", but nonetheless faulted the narrative for having "frequently impenetrable metaphysical musings", and described Severian as "remote" and "unengaging". The SF Site praised Wolfe's imagery, but noted that Severian's departure from linear time can be difficult to follow.

The Urth of the New Sun was nominated for the Hugo Award for Best Novel, the Locus Award for Best Novel, and the Nebula Award for Best Novel in 1988.
