= Bearing sword =

Ceremonial weapon

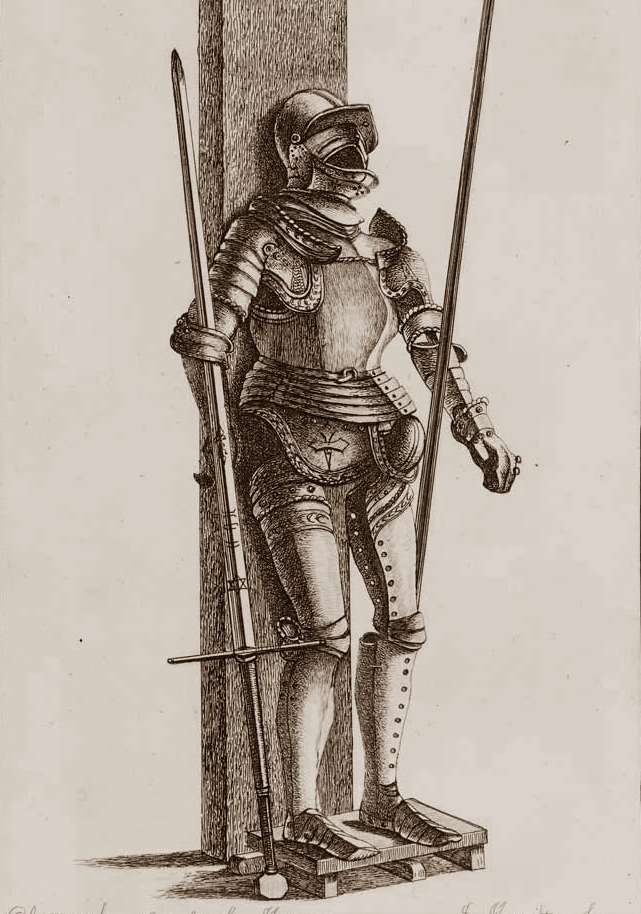
Two handed bearing sword from 'A Treatise on antient armour and weapons' by F. Grose, London, 1786, pl.22

A bearing sword is a type of oversized, unwieldy ceremonial sword usually carried by a squire or servant during parades to demonstrate the wealth and status of its owner. Often held upright and lavishly decorated, these swords were not intended for combat or practical use. Carried by royal bodyguards as a display of power, bearing swords were used throughout Europe from at least as early as the medieval period and as late as the 18th century.
