= Executioner's sword =

Sword used for decapitation of criminals

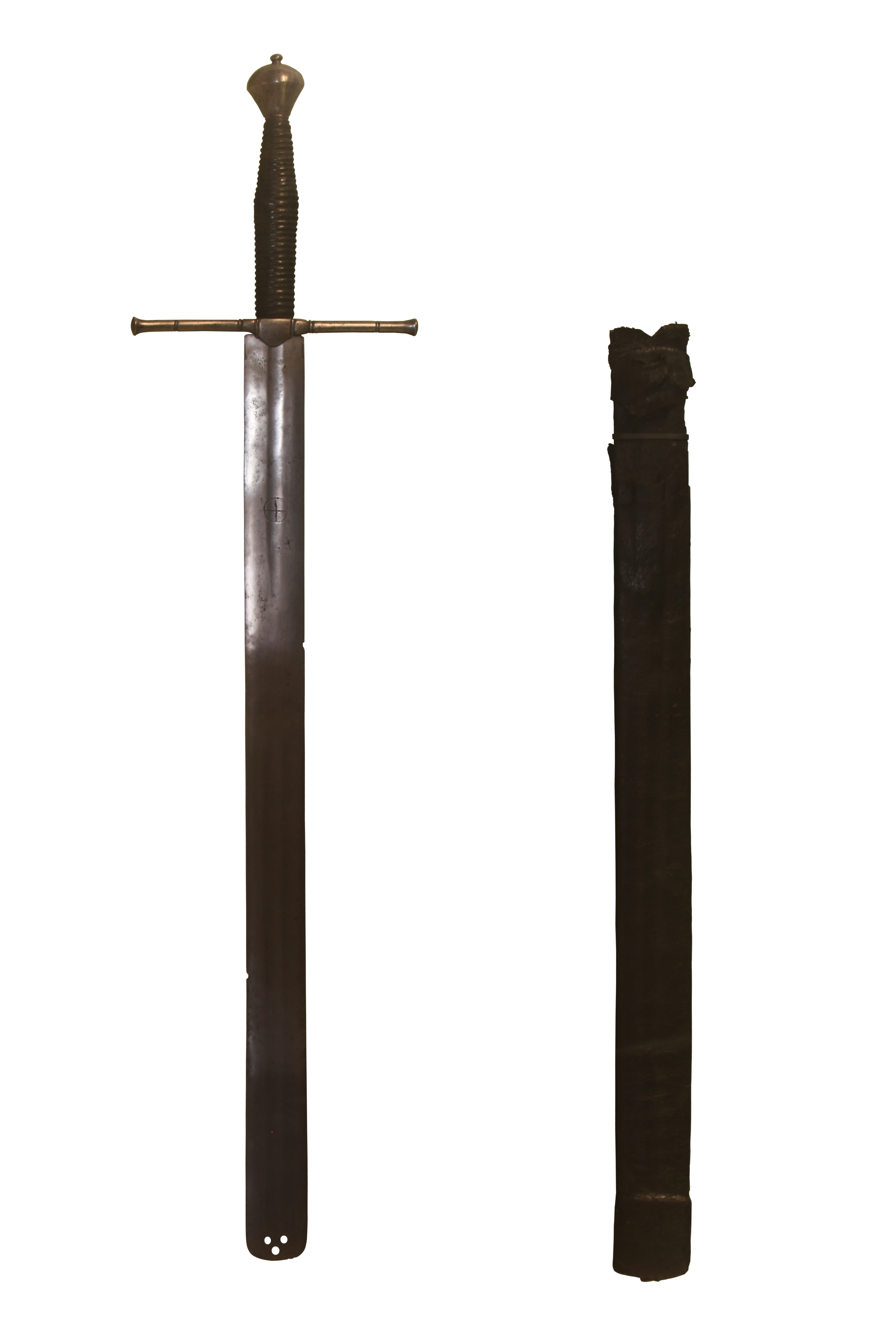
A 16th century executioner's sword from Switzerland

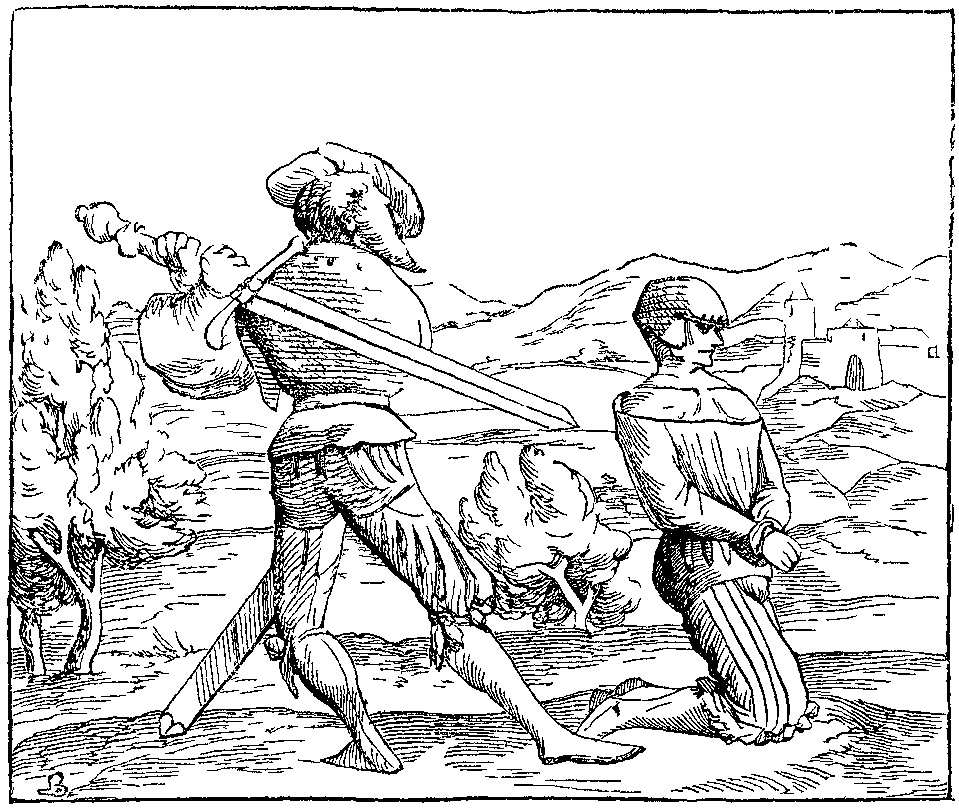
A decapitation scene as shown in Cosmographia universalis of Sebastian Münster (1552).

An executioner's sword is a sword designed specifically for decapitation of condemned criminals (as opposed to combat).

== Design ==
These swords were intended for two-handed use, but were lacking a point, so that their overall blade length was typically that of a single-handed sword (ca. 80–90 cm (31–35 in)). The quillons were quite short, and mainly straight, and the pommel was often pear-shaped or faceted.

Some have 3 holes near the tip, or more rarely 2 or 4, referred to as "bloody" but by 2012 its purpose is considered a mystery.

The blades of executioner's swords were often decorated with symbolic designs. When no longer used for executions, an executioner's sword sometimes continued to be used as a ceremonial sword of justice, a symbol of judicial power.

== History ==
In the Middle Ages, decapitations were performed with regular swords.

Most specifically designed executioner's sword are from the early 16th century up to mid 18th. The earliest known example dates to ca. 1540. They were in wide use in 17th-century Europe, but fell out of use quite suddenly in the early 18th century.

In 1792, official Paris executioner Charles-Henri Sanson produced a memo on decollation and its humane and practical issues when performed by swords to Minister Duport du Tertre, which were raised to the National Assembly and lead to the implementation of the guillotine: Sanson owned two swords given by the Parliament, worth 600 ₶ each, they needed to be sharpened after each beheading and broke often.

The last executions by sword in Europe were carried out in Switzerland in 1867 and 1868, when Niklaus Emmenegger in Lucerne and Héli Freymond in Moudon were beheaded for murder. Swords known as a sulthan are used to carry out executions in Saudi Arabia (see Capital punishment in Saudi Arabia).

== Gallery ==
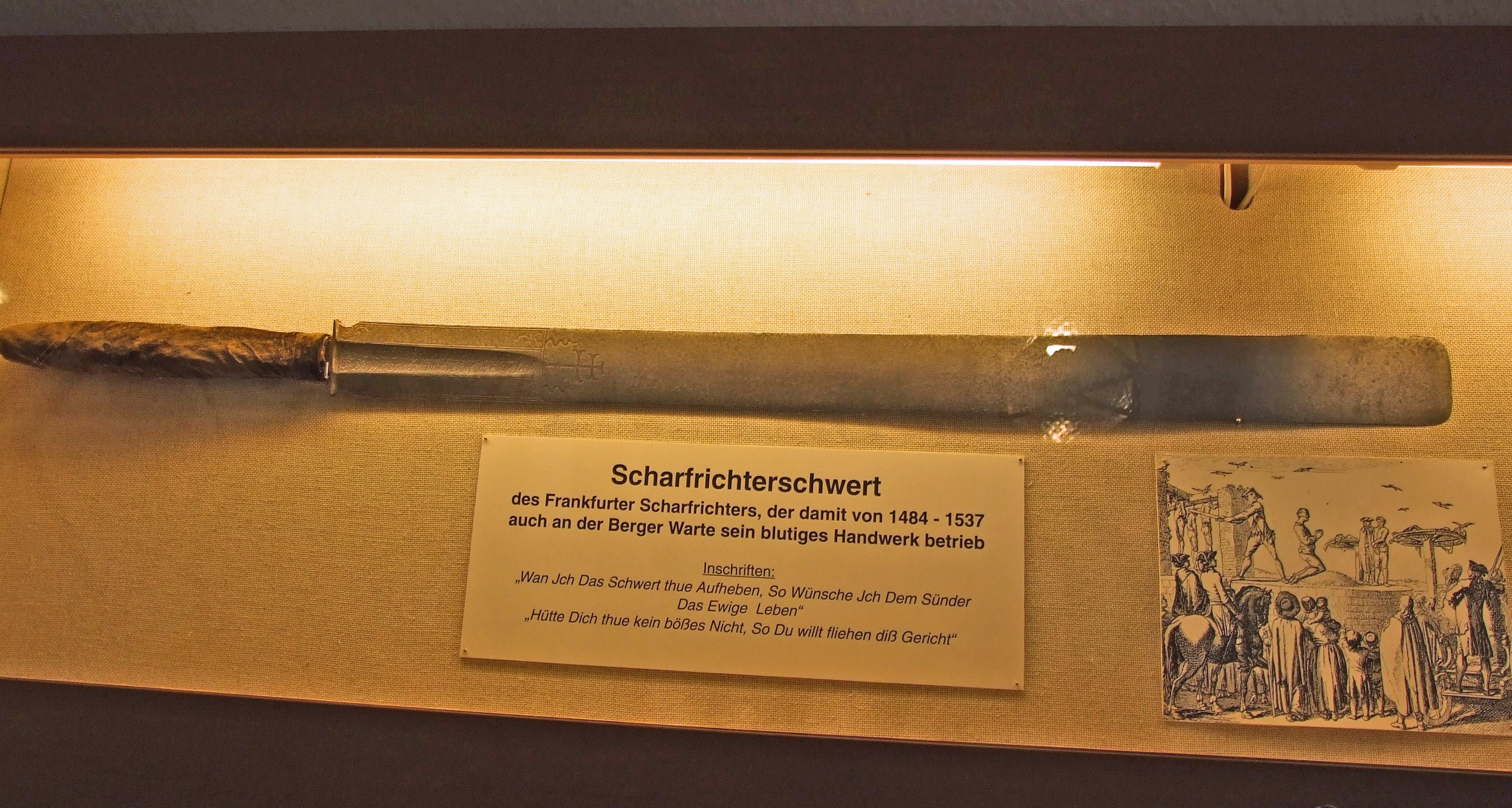
15th century, "Heimatmuseum" at Frankfurt-Bergen-Enkheim
16th century executioner sword. The blade reads, “Wan ich Das Schwerdt thu auff heben so / Wunch ich Dem armen sunder das Ewege Leben,” which translates to “When I raise this sword, so I wish that this poor sinner will receive eternal life.”
16th century executioner sword. The blade reads, “Wan ich Das Schwerdt thu auff heben so / Wunch ich Dem armen sunder das Ewege Leben,” which translates to “When I raise this sword, so I wish that this poor sinner will receive eternal life.”

== See also ==
- Guillotine
- Muhammad Saad al-Beshi, Saudi Arabian executioner
- Terminus Est, a fictional executioner's sword wielded by Severian in the novel series The Book of the New Sun
