= Severian (character) =

Fictional character in The Book of the New Sun

Severian is the narrator and main character of Gene Wolfe's four-volume science fiction series The Book of the New Sun, as well as its sequel, The Urth of the New Sun. He is a Journeyman of the Seekers for Truth and Penitence (a Guild of torturers) who is exiled after showing mercy to one of his clients.

Severian claims to have perfect memory (his eidetic memory is stated as a fact by Gene Wolfe in Shadows of the New Sun). In spite of this, some critics and analysis claim him to be an unreliable narrator.

== Severian's life ==
=== Youth ===
Severian was raised by his guild from birth. His mother was pregnant when she was imprisoned in Matachin Tower of the torturers. They kept him alive after her death, which was their method for getting new candidates for members of the guild. He led a sheltered life there, not knowing much about the rest of the world.

He did hear about Vodalus—an aristocratic rebel, claiming to fight to restore Urth to its former glory—and accidentally saved the outlaw's life. Severian later idolized Vodalus and wanted to join him, but with time he learnt the bitter truth about him.

Severian starts the novel as an apprentice but shortly becomes the captain of apprentices, and later a Journeyman in the Guild of Torturers. As a boy, he rescues a dog named Triskele, which leads him through secret tunnels to a courtyard belonging to an "exultant" (aristocratic) family, where he meets a girl named Valeria.

While still captain of apprentices, Severian meets and befriends the Chatelaine Thecla, a woman who is part of the Autarch's court who has been imprisoned because her sister had become the consort of Vodalus. Thecla is to be treated with special care, and since she takes a liking to Severian, asks that he sit with her for a while each day. Severian eventually falls in love with Thecla. When Thecla is tortured, Severian is moved by love and pity, and sneaks a knife into her cell, allowing her to take her own life and end her suffering.

Severian is briefly imprisoned, but it is decided that his life is to be spared, and (after being given the sword Terminus Est) he is sent to be the Lictor of Thrax, a city in the north. He is also allowed to keep his Torturer's cloak, which is fuligin, "the color that is darker than black."

=== Journey to Thrax ===
As he exits the Necropolis he must pass through the city of Nessus. As he does this, he meets Dorcas and Agia, two diametrically different women he falls in love with. He also obtains the Claw of the Conciliator, a gem with apparently supernatural powers that Severian is attempting to return to its rightful owners, the Pelerines.

He frequently encounters and occasionally travels with a troupe of actors composed of Dr. Talos; a giant, Baldanders; and a beautiful woman, Jolenta. Dr. Talos appears to be the leader of the group but is later revealed to be a homunculus created by Baldanders to be his doctor and servant. Baldanders' gigantism is later revealed to be self-experimentation designed to increase his intelligence and longevity so he may better understand alien technology.

During his travels, he meets with Vodalus and agrees to join his insurrection. At a feast that evening, Severian ingests a portion of Thecla's recovered body together with a drug taken from an (apparently alien) creature called an alzabo, a ritual that conveys to him Thecla's memories. Part of her personality and presence occasionally emerge and some characters seem to recognize, or sense, Thecla when they look at him.

Travelling further, Severian visits the House Absolute, the throne of the commonwealth's Autarch, and is persuaded by the Autarch to change sides and act as a spy on Vodalus' cause.

=== Thrax and further journey ===
When Dorcas and Severian reach Thrax, he thrives as the city's Lictor for a while. However, he once again shows mercy (allowing a woman to escape rather than strangling her to death) and is forced again to flee, leaving Dorcas behind.

He climbs a series of high mountains and rescues a small boy, also named Severian, from an alzabo, a bear-like animal that speaks with the voices of dead people it has eaten. The boy is later killed by a trap set up by Typhon, the former dictator of Urth. Severian accidentally revives Typhon from suspended animation and then kills him.

In additional travels, he eventually becomes a mercenary in the north and is seriously injured. During his convalescence he encounters an Ascian man, before venturing out once again. Towards the end of the final volume of Book of the New Sun, he encounters the Autarch again, but they're captured by Vodalus. The Autarch is critically injured and can only survive within Severian's mind, who eats the forebrain of the Autarch with a mixture the ruler kept along himself at all times, inheriting the throne and all the memories of his predecessors.

Severian marries Valeria and apparently rules the Commonwealth before leaving Urth to bring the New Sun. These events are covered in the follow-up novel Urth of the New Sun, a corollary piece further detailing Severian's travels, offering much insight into some abstruse events in the 4 part Book of the New Sun

== Lineage ==
Dorcas, whom Severian inadvertently resurrects at the Lake of Birds, is almost certainly Severian's paternal grandmother. (Wolfe has named her for the Biblical Dorcas, who was also resurrected.) Ouen, the waiter at the Inn of Lost Loves in Nessus, refers to Dorcas as his "mother come again". Ouen later tells Severian that a locket he has contains a picture of said mother, who died young; Severian recognizes it as Dorcas. The innkeeper there then notes that while Ouen does resemble his mother's picture, in profile he's very like Severian.

Severian quizzes Ouen about his past loves, asking "A woman you loved—or perhaps only one who loved you—a dark woman—was taken once?" Ouen confirms that a woman named Catherine was taken by the law (and therefore handed to the Torturers) after having run off from some religious order (probably the Pelerines). Catherine's child was raised by the Guild, which is where we find the young Severian at the beginning of the book.

At the end of the book, after becoming Autarch and returning to Nessus, Severian takes Ouen to see Dorcas, who has gone to the abandoned outlying districts of Nessus to look for her husband. He tells him to look after Dorcas.

As the Book of the New Sun is full of puns and double meanings, the name of Severian's presumed father, Ouen, is Welsh for the name 'Gene,' the author of the series itself. Catherine is the name of the patron saint of the Guild of Torturers, associated with the real-life torture instrument known as a Catherine wheel.

== Personality ==
Severian's personality is open to interpretation. John Clute wrote in Wolfe's obituary that: "Severian is a torturer who forgives his victims, who has perfect verbal recall but lies constantly. He is a man of insuperable ambition who tells us he has none, even though he is somehow destined to become the ruler of his land. The twist is that he is also something like Christ, transfigured by millions of years of history, but darkly eternal."

Severian is prone to self-doubt and at one point in his narrative, he says he may be insane. As a professional torturer, despite his displays of mercy, he tends to be clinical and detached when describing his work activities, to the point where he assumes the reader is already familiar with his methods and rationalizations.

By the middle of the first book, he carries with him, at all times, an unusual artifact, the "Claw," which apparently has the power to bring the dead back to life, as he does with Dorcas and, later on, a young soldier (before he brings this young man back to life, Severian seems to realize that he almost prefers the company of the dead to the living).

== Appearance ==
Severian describes himself as having a straight nose, deep-set eyes and sunken cheeks. Thecla states she has "never seen such white skin coupled with dark hair." Regarding Severian's appearance of strength, the Autarch remarks that Severian "seemed to me a construction of horn and boiled leather." He is said to be tall, although not at genetically-altered exultant levels. Cyriaca, who never saw him without his mask, describes Severian as having a narrow waist, a sharp chin with a cleft, deeply set, large and mobile eyes, high cheekbones, flat cheeks, black hair and thin lips.

He is usually dressed in the habit of his guild: a fuligin mask, fuligin cloak and fuligin breeches, a belt, hose, black boots & a bare chest. He also carries his sword, Terminus Est, in a "sable manskin" sheath slung over his left shoulder in a baldric. He carries his few possessions in a sabretache attached to his belt.

Severian's height and apparent strength, along with his intelligent and educated manner of speaking, repeatedly lead him to be singled out for special treatment by people who have known him only briefly. These include Dr. Talos, who offers Severian a partnership; the Autarch, who recognizes him as his successor; Cyriaca, who seduces him; the people of the lake, who follow him into battle; Foila, who asks him to judge a story contest; Mannea of the Pelerines, who sends him on an important mission; Guasacht, who offers him a place in the cavalry; and the captain of the Samru, who gives Severian free passage and protection on his vessel. Meeting Severian at the Saltus fair, the green man says, "I'm a fool, I suppose, to put any confidence in you. And yet I do." However, the Cumean's acolyte Merryn calls him "common," and none of the servitors or courtiers of the House Absolute pay him any heed, except for steward Odilo, who takes him for a nobleman [and later, the younger Odilo, in The Urth of the New Sun, who does the same.]

Wolfe describes Severian in Shadows of the New Sun as being 6'1", 175 pounds, with straight black hair and a high square forehead. He has slightly large hands, a long bony face, with moderately high cheekbones and a strong chin. He has dark eyes, pale skin, and good teeth.

== Severian's sword ==
Before Severian leaves the Citadel, Master Palaemon gives him Terminus Est. A sharp, intimidating sword, it serves as a symbol of his authority and as a deadly weapon. Despite its utility, the sword is apparently extremely ostentatious, as "art had been lavished upon her," according to the narrator.

Terminus Est is described as being "Light to raise, weighty to descend." This is due to (in addition to the obvious ethical quandary, in that raising the sword causes no harm, but the descending stroke ends a life by decapitation) a channel in the spine of the blade, containing liquid hydrargyrum, another name for mercury. (Wolfe makes use of obscure terms from Latin and Greek in many of his works, and in the New Sun Cycle additionally makes heavy use of French and Spanish.)

During the course of Severian's travels Terminus Est plays a vital role, alternately saving his life and placing it in peril. Shortly after leaving the Citadel of Nessus, Severian is caught in a ploy masterminded by Agia and her twin brother Agilus, designed to deprive him of his sword and belongings after he loses a duel to the disguised Agilus. Terminus Est is described as having been one of the last works of a famous swordsmith—so in addition to its inherent utility, it is also an antique; Agia describes it as being worth ten times the value of her shop and its inventory.

The sword is double-edged, having both a "male" and "female" side, designed to sever only male heads with one edge and only female heads with the other. Severian takes meticulous care of the sword, always cleaning, oiling, and sharpening the blade before and after an execution, to the point where he uses Terminus Est to shave with, forgoing a razor.

It is analogous to a real-world Sword of Justice, which is designed solely for the purpose of execution. Just like this sword, Terminus Est has a square end and therefore cannot be used as a thrusting weapon.

Terminus Est is eventually destroyed while Severian wields it in battle. This occurs during his fight against Baldanders, his former traveling companion. When Terminus Est strikes the massive and bizarre mace Baldanders wields, which seems to be tuned to the resonant frequency at which Terminus Est would shatter, both weapons are destroyed. Upon the destruction of Terminus Est, Severian recovers the hilt of the shattered blade, later returning it to Master Palaemon upon his return to the Citadel at the close of the series.

=== Other meanings ===
Terminus Est is commonly translated from the Latin as "This is the end", or literally "It is the end". It can also mean "this is the limit", "this is an end" (due to the lack of the definite article), or "this is the border". However, Severian interprets the phrase to mean "this is the line of division", and Typhon translates it as "this is the place of parting".

While it is not strictly in accordance with the grammar of the original Latin, it might perhaps be considered appropriate by some to rephrase the translation "This is the end" as "It is finished." This adjustment would provide a further nod to Christian symbolism, as in the section below.

=== Symbolism ===
Severian describes Terminus Est several times as a "paterissa" or cross (the sword has long, straight guards and is carried over the shoulder, tip-downward) and once as an "iron phallus" (an image suggested by the fluid-filled channel inside the blade.) The cross is of course an instrument of torture and death, but in Christianity it symbolizes resurrection. Master Gurloes's iron phallus was also a torture instrument, but phallic images have long been used to symbolize fertility and therefore life.

== Character creation ==
Wolfe had an idea for a character being a torturer well before he started to work on The Book of the New Sun. When he started writing what was initially to be a novella, he planned for Severian to be banished and return in position of high authority and also to face the problem with Thecla and role of suffering in human life.

== Character analysis ==
=== Severian as a Christ figure ===
Wolfe said in an interview, "I don't think of Severian as being a Christ figure; I think of Severian as being a Christian figure. He is a man who has been born into a very perverse background, who is gradually trying to become better."

=== Severian as The New Sun ===
Severian in his existence earned many names, one of them is Apu-Punchau, which Wolfe borrowed from the Incan Sun God. While Apu-Punchau's identity isn't outwardly revealed in the Tetralogy, it's confirmed in Urth of the New Sun.
