= Gene Wolfe bibliography =

Books by Gene Wolfe

Gene Wolfe was an American author of science fiction and fantasy, with a career spanning six decades.

== Novels ==
Series	Title	Year	Publisher	Nominations	Awards	Ref
	Operation Ares	1970	Berkley Books			
	The Fifth Head of Cerberus	1972	Charles Scribner's Sons			
	Peace	1975	Harper and Row			
	The Devil in a Forest	1976	Follett Publishing			
The Book of the New Sun	The Shadow of the Torturer	1980	Simon & Schuster	1980: Nebula 1981: Locus Fantasy, John W. Campbell	1981: BSFA Award, WFA	
The Book of the New Sun	The Claw of the Conciliator	1981	Timescape Books	1982: Hugo, Mythopoeic, WFA	1981: Nebula 1982: Locus Fantasy	
The Book of the New Sun	The Sword of the Lictor	1982	Timescape Books	1982: Nebula, BSFA 1983: Hugo, WFA	1983: Locus Fantasy, August Derleth Award	
The Book of the New Sun	The Citadel of the Autarch	1983	Timescape Books	1983: Nebula, BSFA, Locus Fantasy	1984: John W. Campbell	
The Book of the New Sun	The Urth of the New Sun	1987	Gollancz	1988: Hugo, Nebula, Locus Science Fiction		
	Free Live Free	1984	Mark V. Ziesing	1985: BSFA 1986: Nebula		
The Soldier series	Soldier of the Mist	1986	Gollancz	1987: Nebula, WFA	1987: Locus Fantasy	
The Soldier series	Soldier of Arete	1989	Tor Books	1990: Locus Fantasy, WFA		
The Soldier series	Soldier of Sidon	2006	Tor Books	2007: Locus Fantasy	2007: WFA	
	There Are Doors	1988	Tor Books	1989: Locus Fantasy		
	Castleview	1990	Tor Books			
	Pandora, By Holly Hollander	1990	Tor Books			
The Book of the Long Sun	Nightside the Long Sun	1993	Tor Books	1993: Nebula 1997: Mythopoeic		
The Book of the Long Sun	Lake of the Long Sun	1994	Tor Books			
The Book of the Long Sun	Caldé of the Long Sun	1994	Tor Books	1995: Nebula		
The Book of the Long Sun	Exodus from the Long Sun	1996	Tor Books			
The Book of the Short Sun	On Blue's Waters	1999	Tor Books			
The Book of the Short Sun	In Green's Jungles	2000	Tor Books	2001: Locus Science Fiction		
The Book of the Short Sun	Return to the Whorl	2001	Tor Books	2002: Locus Science Fiction		
The Wizard Knight	The Knight	2004	Tor Books	2004: Nebula		
The Wizard Knight	The Wizard	2004	Tor Books	Collected as The Wizard Knight: 2005: Locus Fantasy, Mythopoeic, WFA		
	Pirate Freedom	2007	Tor Books	2008: Locus Fantasy		
	An Evil Guest	2008	Tor Books	2009: Locus Fantasy, Mythopoeic		
	The Sorcerer's House	2010	Tor Books	2011: Locus Fantasy		
	Home Fires	2011	Tor Books	2012: John W. Campbell		
	The Land Across	2013	Tor Books	2014: WFA		
Borrowed Man	A Borrowed Man	2015	Tor Books	2016: Locus Science Fiction, Prometheus		
Borrowed Man	Interlibrary Loan	2020	Tor Books	2021: Locus Science Fiction		

== Story collections ==
- The Island of Doctor Death and Other Stories and Other Stories (1980) (Not an error but a literary joke; the title story is "The Island of Doctor Death and Other Stories". Among others, the collection also includes "The Death of Dr. Island" and "The Doctor of Death Island." "The Death of Dr. Island" won the Nebula Award for Best Novella.)
- Gene Wolfe's Book of Days (1981)
- The Wolfe Archipelago (1983), consisting of:
  - "Death of the Island Doctor" (1983)
  - "The Island of Doctor Death and Other Stories" (1970)
  - "The Death of Dr. Island" (1973)
  - "The Doctor of Death Island" (1978)
- Plan(e)t Engineering (1984) (published by Boskone when Wolfe was guest of honor; contains previously uncollected short stories, a new essay on Book of the New Sun and map, several poems, and an article by Wolfe on robots from Plant Engineering magazine)
- Bibliomen (1984)
- Storeys from the Old Hotel (1988) [winner of the World Fantasy Award for best collection]
- Endangered Species (1989)
  - Includes short story Suzanne Delage (1980), originally published in Edges (ed. Ursula K. Le Guin & Virginia Kidd)
- Castle of Days (1992) (omnibus of essay collection Castle of the Otter and story collection Gene Wolfe's Book of Days, along with other essays)
- The Young Wolfe (1992)
- Strange Travelers (2000)
- Latro in the Mist (2003) – omnibus collection of Soldier of the Mist and Soldier of Arete
- Innocents Aboard (2004)
- Starwater Strains (2005)
- The Best of Gene Wolfe (2009) A specialty press edition including an additional story and an introduction by Kim Stanley Robinson was published as The Very Best of Gene Wolfe.
- The Dead Man and Other Horror Stories (2023) – posthumous collection of horror stories
- The Wolfe at the Door (2023) – posthumous collection of previously uncollected stories

== Short stories ==
- "Trip, Trap", first published in Orbit (1967)
- "The Changeling", first published in Orbit (1968)
- "Paul's Treehouse", first published in Orbit 5 (1969)
- "How the Whip Came Back", first published in Orbit 6 (1970)
- "Remembrance to Come", first published in Orbit 6 (1970)
- "Eyebem", first published in Orbit 7 (1970)
- "The Island of Doctor Death and Other Stories", first published in Orbit 7 (1970)
- "A Method Bit in “B”", first published in Orbit 8 (1970)
- "The HORARS of War", first published in Nova 1 (1970)
- "Alien Stones", first published in Orbit (1972)
- "The Headless Man", first published in Universe 2 (1972)
- "Against the Lafayette Escadrille", first published in Again, Dangerous Visions (1972)
- "How I Lost the Second World War and Helped Turn Back the German Invasion", first published in Analog Science Fiction and Fact (May 1973)
- "Continuing Westwards", first published in Orbit 12 (1973)
- "La Befana", first published in Galaxy Magazine (1973)
- "An Article About Hunting", first published in Saving Worlds (1973)
- "The Death of Doctor Island", first published in Universe 3 (1973)
- "Forlesen", first published in Orbit 14 (1974)
- "The Eyeflash Miracles", first published in Future Power, ed. Jack Dann & Gardner Dozois, Random House. (1976)
- "When I Was Ming the Merciless", first published in The Ides of Tomorrow: Original Science Fiction Tales of Horror (1976)
- "Many Mansions", first published in Orbit 19 (1977)
- "To the Dark Tower Came", first published in Orbit 19 (1977)
- "Seven American Nights", first published in Orbit 20 (1978)
- "The Doctor of Death Island", first published in Immortal (1978)
- "The Adopted Father", first published in Isaac Asimov's Science Fiction Magazine (1980)
- "Folia's Story: The Armiger's Daughter", first published in Amazing Stories (November 1982)
- "A Solar Labyrinth", first published in The Magazine of Fantasy & Science Fiction (April 1983)
- "The Cat", first published in the 1983 World Fantasy Convention program book
- "Death of the Island Doctor", first published in The Wolfe Archipelago (1983)
- "A Cabin on the Coast", first published in The Magazine of Fantasy & Science Fiction (1984)
- "The Map", first published in Light Years and Dark: Science Fiction and Fantasy Of and For Our Time (1984)
- "Ain't You 'Most Done", first published in The Sandman, Book of Dreams (1996)
- "Flash Company", first published in The Horns of Elfland (1997)
- "From the Cradle", first published in Shelf Life: Fantastic Stories Celebrating Bookstores (2002)
- "Memorare", first published in The Magazine of Fantasy & Science Fiction (2007)
- "Frostfree", first published in Shadows of the New Sun: Stories in Honor of Gene Wolfe (2013)

== Chapbooks ==
Wolfe published a number of short chapbooks, many published in very small quantities by Cheap Street. Some of these have been reprinted in his collections, as when Starwater Strains reprinted "Empires of Foliage and Flower".

- At the Point of Capricorn (1983)
- The Boy Who Hooked the Sun (1985)
- Empires of Foliage and Flower: A Tale From the Book of the Wonders of Urth and Sky (1987)
- The Arimaspian Legacy (1988)
- Slow Children at Play (1989)
- The Old Woman Whose Rolling Pin is the Sun (1991)
- The Case of the Vanishing Ghost (1991) through The Pretentious Press
- The Grave Secret (1991) through The Pretentious Press
- The Hero as Werwolf (1991) Pulphouse Publishing
- Talk of Mandrakes (2003)
- Christmas Inn (2005)
- Strange Birds (2006)
- Memorare (2008) (novella, first published in The Magazine of Fantasy and Science Fiction in 2007, as a signed limited edition hardcover in 2008)

== Other works ==
- The Castle of the Otter (1982) (a companion to The Book of the New Sun, later collected into Castle of Days)
- Introduction to Patti Perret's The Faces of Science Fiction (1984)
- Introduction to Nancy Kress's Trinity and other stories (1988)
- Letters Home (1991) (collection of letters Wolfe sent home to his mother while he was fighting in the Korean War)
- Introduction to Neil Gaiman's Sandman: Fables and Reflections
- A Walking Tour of the Shambles (with Neil Gaiman) (2002)
- Introduction to Vera Nazarian's Salt of the Air (2006)
- Shadows of the New Sun: Essays (2007)
- Introduction to John Cramer's Twistor (Dover Edition) (2016)

== Critical studies and reviews of Wolfe's work ==
A borrowed man

- Sakers, Don (October 2015). "The Reference Library". Analog Science Fiction and Fact. 135 (10): 105–108.
