= Good News from the Vatican =

Short story by Robert Silverberg

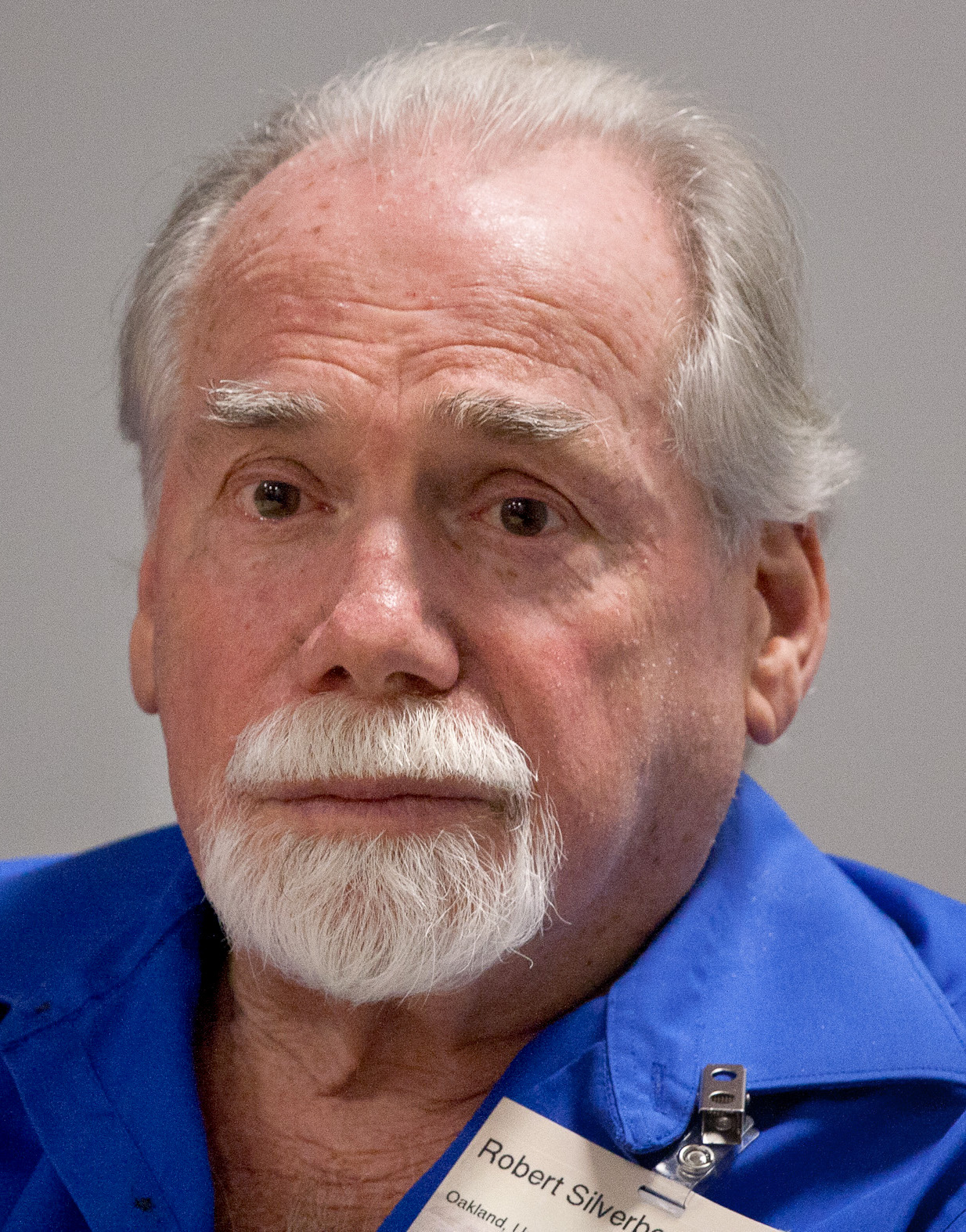
Silverberg in 2009

"Good News from the Vatican" is a 1971 science fiction short story by American author Robert Silverberg, featuring the election of a robot to the position of Pope of the Church of Rome. It won that year's Nebula Award for Best Short Story.

== Plot summary ==
The unnamed first person narrator is one of a group of tourists and travelers, including a Roman Catholic bishop and a rabbi, who find themselves in Rome during an unexpected Papal conclave to select a new Pope. The group gathers each day in an outdoor cafe close to Saint Peter's Square to discuss their thoughts about the possibility of a robot Pope, likely since news reports indicate that the leading candidates, Cardinal Asciuga of Milan and Cardinal Carciofo of Genoa, are unable to garner majority support in the conclave. The narrator and the clergymen appear to be optimistic, but the other characters openly express their misgivings about a robot serving as Pope. White smoke, the traditional sign of a successful election, is seen and the robot appears on the balcony of St Peter's Basilica as the new Pope, taking the name of Pope Sixtus the Seventh. (To date, there have been only five real Popes of that name.) As the story ends, Pope Sixtus delivers a blessing, while flying through the air impelled by levitation jets.

== Interpretation ==
According to The Encyclopedia of Science Fiction, the story celebrates "the integration of the robot into human religious culture", but other critics have noted the satirical and ironic content of the story. Paul Brians points out that the story announces its satirical intent in the first paragraph, with the names of the competing Cardinals being the Italian words for "towel" and "artichoke", respectively. Don D'Ammassa writes that it is a "quiet, understated satire" and notes the themes of the growing homogeneity and dehumanization of religion. Malcolm Edwards categorizes this story as one of a group that Silverberg published in the early 1970s that were more experimental than his longer form work and were influenced by techniques employed by contemporary literary writers like Donald Barthelme and Robert Coover. In these stories, Silverberg ironically reexamined traditional themes of science fiction.

== Publications ==
The story was originally published in Universe 1, an anthology of original science fiction stories edited by Terry Carr. It has been widely anthologized since, including in Best Science Fiction Stories of the Year (1972), edited by Lester del Rey, Nebula Awards Stories 7 (1972), edited by Lloyd Biggle, Jr., and The Norton Book of Science Fiction: North American Science Fiction, 1960-1990 (1999) edited by Ursula K. Le Guin and Brian Attebery.

== See also ==
- Robert Silverberg bibliography
