= SafeRack =

American company manufacturing safety products

SafeRack LLC
- Industry: Industrial supply distribution and manufacturing
- Founded: 2002
- Founders: Rob Honeycutt & Fred Harmon
- Headquarters: Andrews, SC, United States
- Number of employees: ~300
- Website: www.saferack.com

SafeRack is an American company founded in 2002. It manufactures industrial safety products for truck, railcar and industrial loading applications. Its products include access gangways, fall protection systems, loading arms, safety cages and loading rack products.

All SafeRack products are manufactured in Andrews, South Carolina, using robotic technology. Its products are sold internationally and domestically.

== History ==
In 2002, SafeRack was founded.

In November 2011, Plant Engineering awarded SafeRack's ErectaStep platform and stair system Product of the Year Finalist in the Safety Category.

In May 2014, Jeff Reichert was appointed the president of SafeRack.

In December 2015, SafeRack announced a $20 million expansion of its manufacturing facility.

In June 2017, Northern Platforms LTD becomes an exclusive Canadian distributor for SafeRack products in Alberta and British Columbia regions with truck and railcar loading platform systems and safety equipment

== Awards and honors ==
In July 2015, Bluff Manufacturing, Inc. awarded SafeRack with its 2014 Bronze Level Dealer of Excellence Award.

In May 2016, the Georgetown County Chamber of Commerce awarded SafeRack with its “Business of the Year" award.

In September 2020, Occupational Health & Safety recognizes SafeRack GX Gangway with "Product of the Year" in the Fall Protection/Prevention category.
