= Roads Not Taken: Tales of Alternate History =

Short story collection

- Cover of first edition
- Author: edited by Gardner Dozois, Stanley Schmidt
- Language: English
- Genre: Science fiction
- Publisher: Del Rey/Ballantine
- Publication date: 1998
- Publication place: United States
- Media type: Print (paperback)
- Pages: xiv, 322 pp.
- ISBN: 0-345-42194-9

Roads Not Taken: Tales of Alternate History is an anthology of alternate history short works edited by Gardner Dozois and Stanley Schmidt. It was first published in paperback by Del Rey/Ballantine in July 1998.

== Summary ==
The book collects ten short stories by various authors, together with an introductory essay by Shelly Shapiro.

== Contents ==
- "What Is Alternate History?" [essay] (Shelly Shapiro)
- "Must and Shall" (Harry Turtledove)
- "An Outpost of the Empire" (Robert Silverberg)
- "We Could Do Worse" (Gregory Benford)
- "Over There" (Mike Resnick)
- "Ink from the New Moon" (A. A. Attanasio)
- "Southpaw" (Bruce McAllister)
- "The West Is Red" (Greg Costikyan)
- "The Forest of Time" (Michael Flynn)
- "Aristotle and the Gun" (L. Sprague de Camp)
- "How I Lost the Second World War and Helped Turn Back the German Invasion" (Gene Wolfe)
