= Pirate Freedom =

2007 novel by Gene Wolfe

- Cover of first edition
- Author: Gene Wolfe
- Illustrator: David Grove
- Cover artist: David Grove
- Language: English
- Genre: Fantasy novel
- Publisher: Tor
- Publication date: 2007
- Publication place: United States
- Media type: Print (Hardback & Paperback)
- Pages: 320 pp
- ISBN: 0-7653-1878-4
- OCLC: 122527050
- Dewey Decimal: 813/.54 22
- LC Class: PS3573.O52 P75 2007

Pirate Freedom (2007) is a fantasy novel by Gene Wolfe about a young man who is transported back in time and becomes a pirate.

== Setting ==
The majority of the book is set in the Caribbean and nearby regions during the "Golden Age of Piracy". It takes place mostly if not entirely after Henry Morgan burned Panama City (1671) and before the earthquake that destroyed Port Royal, Jamaica (1692).

The rest of the book appears to be set in the early 21st century. The hero is genetically engineered to be tall, and at the time of his birth, monorails are common in the United States, so his birth is in the near future of the time the book was published or in a parallel universe.

== Plot summary ==
The hero is named Christopher (Chris, Crisóforo, Christophe). He recounts his childhood and career as a pirate, interspersed with digressions about events in his later life, including the time when he is writing the book (as in The Book of the Short Sun). The following summarizes his story in the order in which he experiences it.

Chris is a Sicilian-American. When he is ten, Communism ends in Cuba, and his father (apparently a "wiseguy") moves there with him to run a casino. Chris goes to school at a monastery, where he becomes a novice and helps a Brother Ignacio with the farm work. Eventually he walks away from the monastery. Details he notices around that time make it clear that he is now centuries in the past, though Brother Ignacio is still in the monastery.

He lives by theft in Havana until he signs on to a Spanish brig bound for Veracruz, Mexico. After avoiding his shipmates after being raped twice, he takes pleasure in mastering military seamanship.

In Veracruz he meets an English captain, Abraham Burt. Then Chris's ship sails to Spain, where he becomes infatuated with Estrellita, the maid of a wealthy young married woman. Her master puts a stop to the relationship.

He returns to his ship, but on the way back to Mexico they are captured by English pirates under Captain Burt, who takes him onto the pirate ship. They capture a Spanish slave ship, and Burt puts Chris in charge of taking it to Port Royal. When he returns, having freed a few of the slaves, he refuses to join in piracy and Burt abandons him on Hispaniola.

There a French buccaneer (a settler in the wilderness) helps him survive. They and other buccaneers capture a small Spanish warship sent against them, and Chris assumes command. A "boy" on the ship reveals herself as a woman who Chris knew in Spain; Chris takes her to be the maid Estrellita, but calls her "Novia", meaning "sweetheart". They become lovers.

After fights against the Spanish, Chris and his crew meet with Burt. An allied ship has captured a Spanish galley and its owner. The passengers had included one Jaime Guzmán and his wife. Chris deduces Señora Guzmán's hiding place and finds that she is Estrellita; Novia is Guzmán's real wife and Estrellita's former mistress. Guzmán had beaten Novia because—she says—she too was in love with Chris. Though Chris is angry with Novia for lying to him, she still loves him and they reconcile.

Chris rejoins Burt, and their fleet engages in successful and unsuccessful piracy, sailing around South America. At Río Hato, Panama, they rob a mule train of Peruvian gold. That night one crew massacres the rest of the pirates and takes the gold. Chris escapes and finds the dying Burt, who gives him his maps to the treasure he has buried on the Pearl Islands.

Chris and Novia marry in Veracruz. Chris runs into Brother Ignacio and hires him to take care of Novia while Chris reclaims Burt's treasure. He sets out single-handed, but is wrecked and on the last page of the book is rescued by Mexican fishermen who have a radio.

He makes his way to the United States and enters a seminary, then becomes a priest. He resists the temptation to visit the home where his child self lives.

The Cuban Communists fall, and Chris heads to Cuba. He has realized Brother Ignacio was his older self. Finishing his manuscript on a plane to Miami, he explains that he plans to enter his childhood monastery as a lay brother named Ignacio, follow young Chris out of the monastery into 17th-century Cuba, go to Veracruz to meet him and take care of Novia, and eventually take his place as her husband and recover Burt's treasure.

== Religious aspects ==
The book includes religious symbols (including the name of the protagonist) and experiences. It begins with Chris's declaration that he often reads about the lives of people who have sought God and found him, but that he has ". . . either never lost Him, or I have never sought Him." At one point, in response to a prayer of repentance, Chris hears the voice of God as an audible sound.

Chris believes that boys should know how to fight and be willing to so that older boys can, among other things, defend themselves from molestation by priests. When he is a priest in an urban parish, he knocks down teenagers who cause problems in the Youth Center. In another parish, he reinstitutes the Adoration of the Blessed Sacrament.

== Style ==
Chris tells his story in an informal style reminiscent of Wolfe's Wizard Knight (narrated by another young American man), but slangier and more irreverent. His narration includes elements not usually seen in formal narrative, such as colloquial Italian ("alla grande"), profanity in Italian and English ("merda" and "shit"), a private joke that he then explains, and capitals for emphasis. He also uses "parlay" to mean "parley".

== Reception ==
Paul Di Filippo described Pirate Freedom as "remarkably straightforward for Gene Wolfe" and "rip-snorting". He praised the minor characters and the accurate depiction of the period, adding that "Wolfe also makes sure to substitute hard reality in place of any cliché".

Paul Witcover called the book "deceptively breezy" and "surprisingly dark", and said it dealt with deep Christian questions. For him it was "distasteful in many ways" but "a small masterpiece". He too regarded the adventure as "rousing".

Di Filippo saw Chris as charmingly naive, "no matter how bloody his hands get or how many skirts he lifts". However, Witcover saw Chris, the product of genetic engineering who may not have a mother, as "a half-human monster" (a phrase Chris uses about himself), largely unrepentant and lacking empathy. For him, Chris's only redeeming (perhaps in the literal Christian sense) quality is his love for Novia.

The book was a finalist for the Locus Award for best fantasy novel.
