= Universe 3 (Carr anthology) =

- Cover of first edition, 1973
- Editor: Terry Carr
- Cover artist: Bob Silverman
- Language: English
- Series: Universe
- Genre: Science fiction
- Publisher: Random House
- Publication date: 1973
- Publication place: United States
- Media type: Print (hardcover)
- Pages: 209
- ISBN: 0-394-48181-X
- Preceded by: Universe 2
- Followed by: Universe 4

Universe 3 is an anthology of original science fiction short stories edited by Terry Carr, the third volume in the seventeen-volume Universe anthology series. It was first published in hardcover by Random House in 1973, with a Science Fiction Book Club edition following from the same publisher in November of the same year, a paperback edition from Popular Library in January 1975, and a British hardcover edition from Dennis Dobson in October 1977.

The book collects seven novellas, novelettes and short stories by various science fiction authors, with an introduction by Carr.

== Contents ==
- "Introduction" (Terry Carr)
- "The Death of Doctor Island" (Gene Wolfe)
- "The Ghost Writer" (George Alec Effinger)
- "Many Mansions" (Robert Silverberg)
- "Randy-Tandy Man" (Ross Rocklynne)
- "The World Is a Sphere" (Edgar Pangborn)
- "The Legend of Cougar Lou Landis" (Edward Bryant)
- "Free City Blues" (Gordon Eklund)

== Reception ==
Theodore Sturgeon reviewed the anthology favorably, citing Carr for selecting "literate and thought-provoking stor[ies] bearing a special texture."

== Awards ==
The anthology placed third in the 1974 Locus Poll Award for Best Original Anthology.

"The Death of Doctor Island" won the 1973 Nebula Award for Best Novella, was nominated for the 1974 Hugo Award for Best Novella, and placed first in the 1974 Locus Poll Award for Best Novella.

"Many Mansions" placed eleventh in the 1974 Locus Poll Award for Best Short Fiction.

"The World Is a Sphere" placed sixteenth in the 1974 Locus Poll Award for Best Short Fiction.
