= Control Engineering (magazine) =

Trade publication and web site

- Covering control, instrumentation, and automation systems worldwide
- Type: business magazine
- Owner: CFE Media
- Editor: Mark Hoske
- Founded: 1954
- Language: English
- Headquarters: Downers Grove, Illinois, USA
- ISSN: 0010-8049
- Website: Control Engineering

Control Engineering (CtE) (ISSN 0010-8049) is a trade publication and web site owned by CFE Media serving the global control, instrumentation, and automation marketplace.

Established in 1954 by Technical Publishing Company, a division of Dun-Donnelley Publishing Corporation, a Dun & Bradstreet Corp. company, Control Engineering is published monthly. Common topics presented through news, product listings, feature articles, case studies and opinion, included controllers (PLCS & PACs), motors and drives, safety (machine and process), system integration (software, hardware, power supplies, components), control software (including HMI, SCADA and MES), process control, discrete control, industrial networks (fieldbus, Ethernet and wireless), sensors, robotics, I/O, and sustainable/green engineering.

Control Engineering published six other editions.

As of June 2008, total BPA audited circulation was 87,000 subscribers.

Cahners Publishing, a predecessor of Reed Business Information, acquired Technical Publishing in 1986. In April 2010, former owner Reed Business Information announced the magazine's closure; later that month, Control Engineering, Consulting-Specifying Engineer and Plant Engineering were acquired by a new company, CFE Media.

Control Engineering Magazine is available in paper, digital, and online versions. The monthly online version contains several blogs that focus on a variety of topics in the world of automation and control.

One of the blogs is written by former DARPA Grand Challenge team leader Paul Grayson. He writes about an eclectic assortment of people, parts, and products that people interested in the progress of autonomous vehicles might find interesting. Grayson is also a strong supporter of efforts to improve STEM education in the USA and has started a 4-H technology club in his neighbourhood. His adventures working with the next generation of engineers and scientists provide and interesting perspective and sometimes surprises which he reports in the blog.
