= Starwater Strains =

2005 collection of short stories by Gene Wolfe

- First edition cover Art by Joseph Van Os
- Author: Gene Wolfe
- Genre: Short story collection; Science fiction
- Publisher: Tor Books
- Publication date: August 2005
- ISBN: 0-7653-1202-6

Starwater Strains is a collection of short stories by American writer Gene Wolfe. While his previous collection, Innocents Aboard, contained fantasy and horror stories, this one largely consists of science fiction.

== Contents ==
- "Viewpoint"
- "Rattler" (with Brian A. Hopkins)
- "In Glory like Their Star"
- "Calamity Warps"
- "Shields of Mars"
- "From the Cradle"
- "Black Shoes"
- "Has Anyone Seen Junie" Moon?"
- "Pulp Cover"
- "Of Soil and Climes"
- "Dog of the Drops"
- "Mute"
- "Petting Zoo"
- "The Fat Magician"
- "Hunter Lake"
- "The Boy Who Hooked the Sun"
- "Try and Kill It"
- "Game in the Popes Head"
- "Empires of Foliage and Flower"
- "The Armaspian Legacy"
- "The Seraph and the Sepulchre"
- 'Lord of the Land"
- "Golden City Far"
