= The Forest of Time =

1996 novella by Michael Flynn

- Author: Michael Flynn
- Language: English
- Genre: Alternate history
- Published in: Analog
- Publication date: June 1987
- Publication place: USA

The Forest of Time is an alternate history novella by American writer Michael Flynn. It was originally published in the June 1987 issue of Analog magazine. In 1988, the story was nominated for the Hugo Award for Best Novella. It was reprinted in the anthologies The Year's Best Science Fiction: Fifth Annual Collection (1988) and Roads Not Taken: Tales of Alternate History (1998), as well as Flynn's short story collection The Forest of Time and Other Stories (1997).

== Plot ==
The story is set in an alternative world wherein the Thirteen Colonies, after gaining independence from Britain, did not succeed in creating the United States, but instead developed into separate and mutually hostile nation-states which often fight bitter wars with each other.

In the novella, the citizens of Pennsylvania speak a language they call "Pennsylvanisch", which a character describes as "[a] German dialect mainly derived from Swabian and with many English loan words, which a speaker of High German would find it difficult to follow". This language has a rich literary tradition of which the Pennsylvanians are proud; and they feel suspicious of, and threatened by the hostile English-speaking nations of New York to their north, and Virginia to their south.

In that Pennsylvania, only the Quaker communities still speak English as their native language, and they are therefore recruited by the Pennsylvanian Intelligence Service as spies to infiltrate the territories of neighboring nations.

The story's main conflict comes when a Pennsylvanisch officer encounters a man who claims to be from the United States as we, the readers, know it. The officer first regards the man as either truly mad, or feigning madness to cover his mission of espionage for an enemy such as New York, but soon becomes enamored and full of longing for the parallel universe described by the captive. As it turns out, he had been in several life-threatening situations in previous worlds he visited and thought making a transit in the countryside away from cities would be the best way to avoid getting attention - a logical idea, but completely wrong. In this world, the piece of countryside was a hotly disputed no-man's land in a war zone, and the very fact of his speaking English caused him to be suspected as an enemy spy.

In a brief part of the story, the time traveler's journal reveals that he has visited other worlds, including one with an Axis victory in World War II. A reference to nuns being hanged on lamp posts in Philadelphia might point specifically to Eric Norden's The Ultimate Solution, in whose plot the Nazi occupiers of that city summarily execute the members of a resistance cell made up of Catholic priests, monks and nuns. The traveler has also passed through a world where the Plantagenet Dynasty still rules England (and North America) and where a kind of scientific magic is practiced. This might be the world of Randall Garrett's Lord Darcy. Other visited worlds include one where Native American culture kept pace with the European one, an Iroquis ship discovered Ireland at much the same time that Europeans reached America (not called that in this timeline) and by the 20th Century a united humanity established a colony on Mars. A far less pleasant world visited was one which had recently undergone a nuclear war and Pennsylvania was a radioactive wasteland. And there was also a world where the site of Philadelphia was taken by a Medieval Japanese city, inhabited by suspicious, aggressive sword-wielding samurai (no explanation of the history which led to this).

== Historical background ==
The alternate history timeline of the story hinges on the historical event known as the Pennamite–Yankee Wars. In actual history, Pennsylvania and Connecticut both laid claim to the Wyoming Valley, both colonies having been granted that territory by King Charles II in the 17th century, though only a century later did European settlers overcome Native American resistance and embark on settling it. Rival settlers from Pennsylvania (Pennamites) and Connecticut (Yankees) came into violent conflict, both just before and just after the American War of Independence—though very few people were actually killed, so that the term "war" for this conflict is rather exaggerated. Eventually, the conflict was settled peaceably: Pennsylvania's possession of the disputed area was confirmed, but the Yankees settled in it were accepted as full-fledged citizens of Pennsylvania, their main town of Wilkes-Barre becoming one more Pennsylvanian town (eventually, city). By the early 19th century the whole issue receded into the past.

However, in the alternate history of Flynn's book, in the 1780s George Washington took a personal interest in the Pennamite–Yankee War and in a fatally misguided step placed a unit of the Virginia militia, commanded by himself, as a neutral buffer between Pennamites and Yankees. This culminated with the Virginians being trapped and decimated in a crossfire, Washington himself being among those killed. When the news of Washington's death reached Philadelphia, where the Constitutional Convention was just convening, Benjamin Franklin suffered a stroke and died, too. The convention broke up in consternation, and the Constitution of the United States was never adopted and a Federal Government never created. The loose structure of the Continental Congress eventually disintegrated, with the Thirteen Colonies going each its own way as full-fledged nation states—except that the Yankees of New England created their own more narrow confederation.

In this situation, Yankee settlers—backed by the rest of New England—held on to much of the Wyoming Valley, their conflict with Pennsylvania further escalating; rather than part of Connecticut, they created the new nation of The Wyoming (not connected to our history's State of Wyoming, much more to the west). Eventually, two mutually hostile nation states emerged, possessing fully equipped regular armies—hereditary enemies which habitually and repeatedly go to war with each other. To Pennsylvanians, Wilkes-Barre became a deeply hated enemy capital, created on stolen land which was rightfully Pennsylvania's (reminiscent of the historical conflict between France and Germany over Alsace-Lorraine). With Pennsylvania adopting the German language while the Yankees remained English-speaking, the political enmity was exacerbated by increasing linguistic and cultural differences. At the same time, Pennsylvania also has marked cultural and political differences from the Prussian-dominated Germany in Europe. Pennsylvanians speak a different kind of German, and pride themselves on having much more free society and political institutions, a difference especially owing to many Pennsylvanians being descended from political refugees who fled Germany.

In the 19th century, the British helped Chiefs Tecumseh and Sequoyah create Native American states which, although thinly populated, were able to stand up to European settlers, with the former Thirteen Colonies being disunited, acting at cross-purposes and often going to war with each other. Eventually, the idea of further westward expansion was abandoned, the European settlement of North America never reached much further than it was at the end of the 18th century. In Britain, there was no Victorian Era, since Victoria never became Queen, and in her absence Britain did much worse economically and incidentally lost its power in North America; this world has no United States and also no Canada. By 1970 when the story takes place, technology has only reached a level roughly similar to our history's late 19th or early 20th century. Samuel Morse is remembered only as a painter, not an inventor; the telegraph was invented only much later, by Thomas Edison, who made only a few other inventions. Henry Ford either did not exist at all, or he never built his factory; automobiles are few, hand-made and very expensive, and a case when two of them nearly collided is remembered as a special occasion. Radio does not yet exist, and its feasibility is hotly debated, and the same for heavier than air flight. In military affairs, a Star fortress—long obsolete in our history—remains a highly effective military resource for all armies, and the story's plot takes place in such a fortress.

About twenty years before, Pennsylvania was involved in a major war, the "Piney War". Its foes, New York and Virginia, sought to partition New Jersey between themselves and deny Pennsylvania access to the sea; however, the Pennsylvanians proved the victors, trashing their opponents and securing the bulk of New Jersey. In this war, New York troops were decimated when trying to storm a Pennsylvanian machine gun position; however, this world did not yet see such scenes on the scale of our history's First World War. The story's Pennsylvanian protagonist had a major role in that war's decisive battle. (Though not explicitly mentioned, for Virginia to be in a position to try conquering parts of New Jersey, Virginia must have swallowed Maryland at some earlier stage.)

At the time of the story, the Virginians and the New York "Knicks", seeking revenge, had forged an alliance with Pennsylvania's hereditary Yankee enemies as well as with the Iroquois to the west, creating a ring of enemies all around Pennsylvania. Should all of them attack simultaneously from all directions, Pennsylvania would be in a dire situation. The Pennsylvanians' best strategy would be to play for time and seek to create divisions among its enemies—who had often fought each other, even in the recent past—and hope for the anti-Pennsylvanian alliance to fall apart.

The full political and military details are not provided, and only glimpses are given in passing. In this history's nation state of New York, New York City is far smaller than in reality and of much less account; decision-making in New York is still to a considerable degree in the hands of patroons, Dutch-descended landowners of the Hudson Valley. In Virginia, effective political power is in the hands of "The Lee Brothers", presumably members of the Lee family which was prominent in Colonial Virginia; but the story does not tell what is the Lee Brothers' official and legal position in Virginian politics, or even how many brothers are there. The rest of North America is also balkanized into many nations and there are passing references to some of them, which are too distant to take direct part in the conflict: The Kingdom of Carolina to the south, French-speaking Quebec to the north, Spanish-speaking Nuevo Aztlan far to the west, Columbia, Cumberland, Pontiak. There is a single reference to Texas and no reference whether this Texas is Spanish- or English-speaking. The Kingdom of Carolina is mentioned as "the biggest state on the Eastern seaboard" and a producer of fine tobacco; probably, as well as North and South Carolina, its territory includes Georgia and possibly Florida, too.

The whole story includes no reference to Blacks and leaves unclear whether slavery was abolished and if so, how that was achieved.

The story's plot takes place at a Pennsylvanian festung (star fortress) overlooking the no-man's-land of the Wyoming Valley, whose garrison is tensely expecting the storm to burst. It is into this tense situation that the visitor from another reality is suddenly flung.

== Analysis ==
In actual US history, a large part of Pennsylvania's population in the 18th century were indeed speakers of a Germanic language (not to be confused with standard German), though the elites in the colony and later state were English-speaking. The numbers of Germanic speakers dwindled in later periods, though the language still survives, especially among the Amish. It is known as "Pennsylvania Dutch" (i.e., Deitsch, meaning "German, Germanic" rather than referring to the Netherlands) and sometimes also called "Pennsilfaanisch Deitsch" by its own speakers.

Flynn assumes that in a situation where Pennsylvania became an independent nation-state, distinct from and often fighting with its neighbors, Pennsylvanisch had a chance to become the official and dominant language, which later immigrants learned upon arrival.

== See also ==
- The Disunited States of America
- GURPS Infinite Worlds § Gallatin
- Russian Amerika
