= Storeys from the Old Hotel =

1988 short story collection by Gene Wolfe

- First edition cover Cover art by Pete Lion
- Author: Gene Wolfe
- Genre: Short story collection
- Publisher: Kerasina Books
- Publication date: 1988
- ISBN: 978-0-948-89329-2

Storeys from the Old Hotel is a 1988 short story collection by American science fiction author Gene Wolfe. It won the World Fantasy Award for Best Collection.

In the introduction, Wolfe describes the stories within the collection as "some of my most obscure work."

== Contents ==
- The Green Rabbit from S'Rian
- Beech Hill
- Sightings at Twin Mounds
- Continuing Westward
- Slaves of Silver
- The Rubber Bend
- Westwind
- Sonya, Crane Wessleman, and Kittee
- The Packerhaus Method
- Straw
- The Marvelous Brass Chessplaying Automaton
- To the Dark Tower Came
- Parkroads---A Review
- The Flag
- Alphabet
- A Criminal Proceeding
- In Looking-Glass Castle
- Cherry Jubilee
- Redbeard
- A Solar Labyrinth
- Love, Among the Corridors
- Checking Out
- Morning Glory
- Trip, Trap
- From the Desk of Gilmer C. Merton
- Civis Laputus Sum
- The Recording
- Last Day
- Death of the Island Doctor
- Redwood Coast Roamer:
  - On the Train
  - In the Mountains
  - At the Volcano's Lip
  - In the Old Hotel
- Choice of the Black Goddess
