= Universe 1 (Carr anthology) =

1971 anthology edited by Terry Carr

- Cover of first edition, 1971
- Editor: Terry Carr
- Illustrator: Alicia Austin
- Cover artist: Davis Meltzer
- Language: English
- Series: Universe
- Genre: Science fiction
- Publisher: Ace Books
- Publication date: 1971
- Publication place: United States
- Media type: Print (paperback)
- Pages: 249
- Followed by: Universe 2

Universe 1 is an anthology of original science fiction short stories edited by Terry Carr, and illustrated by Alicia Austin, the initial volume in a series of seventeen. It was first published in paperback by Ace Books in 1971, with a British hardcover facsimile edition following from Dennis Dobson in 1975.

The book collects twelve novelettes and short stories by various science fiction authors, with an introduction by Carr. Alicia Austin supplied a full-page illustration for each story, returning just once more for Universe 2.

== Contents ==
- "Introduction" (Terry Carr)
- "West Wind, Falling" (Gregory Benford and Gordon Eklund)
- "Good News from the Vatican" (Robert Silverberg)
- "Jade Blue" (Edward Bryant)
- "Nor Limestone Islands" (R. A. Lafferty)
- "Time Exposures" (Wilson Tucker)
- "Mindship" (Gerard F. Conway)
- "Notes for a Novel About the First Ship Ever to Venus" (Barry N. Malzberg)
- "Poor Man, Beggar Man" (Joanna Russ)
- "The Romance of Dr. Tanner" (Ron Goulart)
- "The Human Side of the Village Monster" (Edward Bryant)
- "Mount Charity" (Edgar Pangborn)
- "All the Last Wars at Once" (George Alec Effinger)

== Reception ==
Theodore Sturgeon praised Universe 1 as "a nice full-spectrum anthology of originals" which "stay[s] within Carr's rather strict definition of what sf ought to be."

== Awards ==
The anthology placed first in the 1972 Locus Poll Award for Best Original Anthology.

"Good News from the Vatican" won the 1971 Nebula Award for Best Short Story.

"Poor Man, Beggar Man" was nominated for the 1971 Nebula Award for Best Novelette.

"Mount Charity" was nominated for the 1971 Nebula Award for Best Novelette and placed sixth in the 1972 Locus Poll Award for Best Short Fiction.

"All the Last Wars at Once" was nominated for the 1972 Hugo Award for Best Short Story and placed second in the 1972 Locus Poll Award for Best Short Fiction.
