= Consulting-Specifying Engineer =

Trade publication and website

- Type: Business magazine
- Owner: CFE Media LLC
- Editor: Amara Rozgus
- Founded: 1952, 1958
- Language: English
- Headquarters: Oak Brook, Illinois, US
- Circulation: 46,714
- ISSN: 0892-5046
- Website: www.csemag.com

Consulting-Specifying Engineer (ISSN 0892-5046) is a trade publication and website owned by CFE Media, serving the information needs of engineering personnel who perform various consulting engineering activities.

The magazine is published monthly and covers Consulting-Specifying Engineering subjects, such as: Mechanical, Electrical, Plumbing, Lighting, Fire and Life Safety, and Controls/BAS Engineering. Other subject areas include Career and Engineering trends, Codes and Standards, and Convention coverage.

Consulting-Specifying Engineer publishes several programs throughout each year:

- 40 Under 40 - A program which features 40 consulting-specifying engineers under the age of 40.
- MEP Giants - A program which ranks the 100 largest mechanical/electrical/plumbing consulting firms in the United States.
- Product of the Year - A program which receives products from ten categories across the Consulting-Specifying field and allows for readers to vote for their favorites.

== History ==
Consulting-Specifying Engineer has existed since 1987 in its current form, a combination of two monthly, older publications: Consulting Engineer (dating back to 1952) and Actual Specifying Engineer (to 1958).

In April 2010, former owner Reed Business Information announced the magazine's closure; later that month, Control Engineering, Consulting-Specifying Engineer and Plant Engineering were acquired by a new company, CFE Media LLC.

As of September 2010, total BPA circulation was 46,714 engineer subscribers employed by consulting, engineer/architectural, design/build firms, or in-house engineers.
