= How I Lost the Second World War and Helped Turn Back the German Invasion =

1973 short story by Gene Wolfe

"How I Lost the Second World War and Helped Turn Back the German Invasion" is an alternate history short story by American writer Gene Wolfe. It was first published in Analog Science Fiction and Fact in May 1973, and has since been republished in The Best of Analog (1978), in Gene Wolfe's Book of Days (where it represented Memorial Day) (1981), in Castle of Days (1992), in Roads Not Taken: Tales of Alternate History (1998), and in Knights of Madness (1998).

== Plot summary ==
In a more peaceful 1938, journalist Winston Churchill challenges Reichschancellor Adolf Hitler to an auto race to prove whose nation produced the superior car; meanwhile, the narrator—a U.S. Army soldier stationed in London—tells of how he was defeated in a military board game.

== Reception ==
"How I Lost the Second World War and Helped Turn Back the German Invasion" was nominated for the 1974 Nebula Award for Best Short Story.

Claude Lalumière has described it as "amusing", and Jon Evans has called it "brilliant" and "a fantastic read", and points out that it is "about the inner workings of transistors." Conversely, Mark Shainblum has described it as "tedious and a little precious".
