= A Walking Tour of the Shambles =

2002 novel by Neil Gaiman and Gene Wolfe

- First edition
- Author: Neil Gaiman and Gene Wolfe
- Cover artist: Gahan Wilson
- Language: English
- Publisher: American Fantasy Press
- Publication date: 15 April 2002
- Publication place: United States
- Media type: Print (paperback)
- Pages: 57 pages
- ISBN: 0-9610352-6-9
- OCLC: 50766242
- Dewey Decimal: 823/.914 22
- LC Class: PR6057.A319 W35 2002

A Walking Tour of the Shambles (Little Walks For Sightseers #16) (2002), written by Neil Gaiman and Gene Wolfe, is a novel in the form of a tour guide concerning a fictional part of Chicago called 'The Shambles'. It guides the reader through such non-existent landmarks as The House of Clocks (according to the official website), Cereal House (home of the Terribly Strange Bed), and Gavagan's Irish Saloon. A collaboration between Neil Gaiman and Gene Wolfe (cover by Gahan Wilson, with interior illustrations by Randy Broecker and Earl Geier), it was published with two different covers by the American Fantasy Press (one crediting "Gaiman and Wolfe", the other crediting "Wolfe and Gaiman").

Although Chicago doesn't have a Shambles, Philadelphia, for instance, does.
