= The Devil in a Forest =

1976 novel by Gene Wolfe

- First edition
- Author: Gene Wolfe
- Cover artist: David Palladini
- Genre: Historical fiction
- Publisher: Follett
- Publication date: 1976
- Media type: Print
- ISBN: 0-695-80667-X

The Devil in a Forest is a short novel by American writer Gene Wolfe about the conflict between Christianity and an earlier pagan religion in Europe during the Middle Ages.

== Plot summary ==
The hero of the story, Mark, is an adolescent, an orphan, and the apprentice to a weaver very near a small holy Christian shrine. The shrine is within the King's Forest, and the very small village where he lives is on the edge of the forest. During the course of the novel the village is occupied by both a brutal squad of the King's foresters, and a mob of the pagan charcoal burners who eke out a living in the forest.

Wolfe explains, in an author's note, that the novel was inspired by a stanza of the traditional Christmas carol "Good King Wencelas". He describes the novel as an attempt to imagine what peasant life was like.

Hither, page, and stand by me,

If thou know'st it telling;

Yonder peasant, who is he?

Where and what his dwelling?

Sire, he lives a good league hence,

Underneath the mountain,

Close against the forest fence,

By Saint Agnes's fountain."

== Reception ==
David R. Dunham reviewed The Devil in a Forest for Different Worlds magazine and stated that "Not only is Devil a good book to read, but it's a fascinating glimpse at the lifestyle of a peasant. Lots of small details show how their standard of living is much lower than what we're used to. Mark doesn't have a real bed, for example, and though he won't starve he may go hungry at times. Illiteracy is rampant - Mark can barely remember what the first letter of his name looks like. Everyone has their place in society, and peasants certainly aren't at the top, as is shown in their dealings with nobility and soldiers (or 'hardbacks: as they are called). Despite all this, or perhaps because they're used to it, the peasants do seem able to enjoy life."

== Reviews ==
- Review by Beverly Friend (1977) in Delap's F & SF Review, March 1977
- Review by Darrell Schweitzer (1977) in Science Fiction Review, May 1977
- Review by Susan Wood (1978) in Locus, #210 April 1978
- Review by Algis Budrys (1978) in The Magazine of Fantasy and Science Fiction, May 1978
- Review by Darrell Schweitzer (1978) in Science Fiction Review, May 1978
