= Straw (story) =

1975 short story by Gene Wolf

"Straw" is an alternate history short story by Gene Wolfe, first published in Galaxy Science Fiction in 1975.

== Synopsis ==
In a world where hot-air balloons were invented a thousand years earlier than in reality, an elderly mercenary reminisces about his adolescence.

== Reception ==
The Internet Review of Science Fiction considered it to be "well written", with "rounded characters"; Publishers Weekly, however, felt that the story's premise was "more provocative and interesting than" the actual story, which "goes nowhere". The story has been cited as an example of "manipulative systems" in Wolfe's work, in that the mercenaries are lured into landing in a castle on the pretext that they will be provided with straw for fuel, only to be told that they must first defend the castle from attackers; Thomas D. Clareson observed that despite the story ending with an imminent attack by raiders, no detail of battle are provided.
