= The Death of Doctor Island =

Science fiction novella by Gene Wolfe

- Author: Gene Wolfe
- Genre: Science fiction
- Publisher: Random House (Universe 3)
- Publication date: 1973

The Death of Doctor Island is a science fiction novella by American writer Gene Wolfe first published as The Death of Dr. Island in Universe 3 (Editor Terry Carr, Random House, 1973).

== Synopsis ==
Nicholas Kenneth de Vore is a teenage boy who has spent much of his life institutionalized because of his violent tendencies after receiving a corpus callosotomy to treat his seizures. He discovers that the island where he is being held captive is actually an entity calling itself "Doctor Island", which claims to be supervising his treatment.

== Reception ==
The Death of Doctor Island won the Nebula Award for Best Novella in 1973 and the 1974 Locus Poll Award for Best Novella, and was a finalist for the 1974 Hugo Award for Best Novella.

== See also ==
- The Island of Doctor Death and Other Stories and Other Stories
