= Universe 2 (Carr anthology) =

1972 anthology edited by Terry Carr

- Cover of first edition, 1972
- Editor: Terry Carr
- Illustrator: Alicia Austin
- Cover artist: Dean Ellis
- Language: English
- Series: Universe
- Genre: Science fiction
- Publisher: Ace Books
- Publication date: 1972
- Publication place: United States
- Media type: Print (paperback)
- Pages: 255
- Preceded by: Universe 1
- Followed by: Universe 3

Universe 2 is an anthology of original science fiction short stories edited by Terry Carr and illustrated by Alicia Austin, the second volume in the seventeen-volume Universe anthology series. It was first published in paperback by Ace Books in 1972, with a British hardcover facsimile edition following from Dennis Dobson in 1976.

The book collects thirteen novelettes and short stories by various science fiction authors. As in Universe 1, each story is accompanied by a full-page illustration by Alicia Austin. With the change of publisher for Universe 3 and subsequent volumes the illustrations were discontinued.

== Contents ==
- "Retroactive" (Bob Shaw)
- "When We Went to See the End of the World" (Robert Silverberg)
- "Funeral Service" (Gerard F. Conway)
- "A Special Condition in Summit City" (R. A. Lafferty)
- "Patron of the Arts" (William Rotsler)
- "Useful Phrases for the Tourist" (Joanna Russ)
- "On the Downhill Side" (Harlan Ellison)
- "The Other Perceiver" (Pamela Sargent)
- "My Head's in a Different Place, Now" (Grania Davis)
- "Stalking the Sun" (Gordon Eklund)
- "The Man Who Waved Hello" (Gardner R. Dozois)
- "The Headless Man" (Gene Wolfe)
- "Tiger Boy" (Edgar Pangborn)

== Awards ==
The anthology placed second in the 1973 Locus Poll Award for Best Original Anthology.

"When We Went to See the End of the World" was nominated for the 1972 Nebula Award for Best Short Story and the 1973 Hugo Award for Best Short Story, and placed fourteenth in the 1973 Locus Poll Award for Best Short Fiction."

"Patron of the Arts" was nominated for the 1972 Nebula Award for Best Novelette and the 1973 Hugo Award for Best Novelette, and placed second in the 1973 Locus Poll Award for Best Short Fiction.

"On the Downhill Side" was nominated for the 1972 Nebula Award for Best Short Story and placed thirteenth in the 1973 Locus Poll Award for Best Short Fiction.
