= Memorare (novella) =

- Short story by Gene Wolfe
- Language: English
- Genre: Science fiction

Publication
- Published in: The Magazine of Fantasy & Science Fiction
- Publication type: Magazine
- Publication date: April 2007

"Memorare" is a science fiction novella by American writer Gene Wolfe, published in 2007. It was nominated for the 2008 Nebula Award for Best Novella.

== Plot summary ==
The story follows March Wildspring, a film maker who has traveled to the asteroid belt and is filming inside the memorials left behind as tombstones for departed space travelers. It is dangerous work because several of them contain traps intended to kill unsuspecting visitors and force their souls into eternal bondage. To help him with the voice over commentary March's girlfriend, Kit, goes to the asteroid belt with a battered woman who is trying to escape her abusive husband. Together, the three of them decide to enter the most dangerous memorial of all.
