= Soldier of Arete =

1989 fantasy novel by Gene Wolfe

- Hardcover edition
- Author: Gene Wolfe
- Language: English
- Series: Soldier
- Genre: Fiction
- Publisher: Tor Books
- Publication date: September 1989
- Publication place: United Kingdom
- Media type: Print (Hardback and paperback)
- Pages: 354 pp
- ISBN: 978-0312931858
- Preceded by: Soldier of the Mist
- Followed by: Soldier of Sidon

Soldier of Arete is a 1989 fantasy novel by American writer Gene Wolfe, published by Tor Books. The novel is a sequel to Soldier of the Mist.

Soldier of the Mist and Soldier of the Arete have been collected as Latro in the Mist.

== Synopsis ==
Wolfe's forgetful protagonist Latro keeps on traveling throughout ancient Greece.
