= The Castle of the Otter =

Collection of essays by Gene Wolfe

- First edition
- Author: Gene Wolfe
- Language: English
- Genre: Essay Collection
- Publisher: Ziesing Brothers
- Publication date: 1982
- ISBN: 0-917488-10-5

The Castle of the Otter is a collection of essays and other non-fiction by Gene Wolfe, related to his Book of the New Sun tetralogy. It takes its title from an incorrect announcement of Wolfe's final volume in Locus. The Citadel of the Autarch was the actual name of the final work in the series. Wolfe liked the inaccurate title, though, and reused it as the name for a companion work of non-fiction essays and unused materials from the series (including an article about how Otter got its title).

The Castle of the Otter (1982, ISBN 0-917488-10-5) is something of a collector's item; its first edition sold out before its publication date. Originally published as a small press edition by Ziesing Brothers, it was later offered for sale through the Science Fiction Book Club.

The material in Castle of the Otter was combined with his short story collection Gene Wolfe's Book of Days to make the volume Castle of Days.

== Reception ==
Algis Budrys "commended" the collection to readers of his review column, describing it as "a book not just about a book, but about books and literacy."
