= Soldier of Sidon =

2006 fantasy novel by Gene Wolfe

- Author: Gene Wolfe
- Cover artist: David Grove
- Language: English
- Series: Soldier
- Genre: Fantasy
- Publisher: Tor
- Publication date: 2006
- Publication place: United States
- Media type: Print (Hardback and paperback)
- Pages: 319
- ISBN: 0-7653-1670-6
- Preceded by: Soldier of Arete

Soldier of Sidon is a 2006 fantasy novel by American writer Gene Wolfe.

It is the third part of the Soldier (or Latro) series of books, with two preceding novels, Soldier of the Mist (1986) and Soldier of Arete (1989). Soldier of Sidon continues the adventures of the Soldier series's protagonist, Latro, in Egypt at the time of the Achaemenid Empire.

== Plot ==
This book continues with the conceit of the earlier two books of having the tale arising from the translation of scrolls discovered in the present day, allegedly written in Latro's own hand.

Latro suffered a head wound as a mercenary in the army of the Persian King Xerxes at the Battle of Plataea. As Tony Keen in his review states: Latro cannot recall events of more than a day, but on the other hand, he can see gods and demigods. In this book, the gods and demigods encountered by Latro and his companions, in their journey up the Nile in a search for a cure to his affliction, are Egyptian and African, rather than the Greek ones of the two earlier books.

== Characters ==
- Latro (aka Lucius, Lewqys): the Hero who journeys southward up the Nile in search of his lost memories.
- Myt-ser'eu ("Kitten"): Latro's chief Companion on his journey; a singing girl, rented from the priests of the Temple of Hathor in Sais, Egypt. As his river-wife, to be returned to the Temple at the end of his return journey; they love, converse, quarrel and part, and have reunited by the end of Soldier of Sidon.

== Reception ==
Well received on its publication, the novel was winner in 2007 of the World Fantasy Award for Best Novel.

The novel also received 3rd place in the Fantasy Novel category of the 2007 Locus Awards.
