= Gene Wolfe's Book of Days =

1981 short story collection by Gene Wolfe

- First edition
- Author: Gene Wolfe
- Cover artist: Lawrence Ratzkin
- Language: English
- Genre: Science fiction and fantasy
- Publisher: Doubleday Books
- Publication date: 1981
- Publication place: United States
- Media type: Print (hardback & paperback)
- Pages: 182 pp
- ISBN: 978-0-385-15991-3

Gene Wolfe's Book of Days is a short story collection by American science fiction author Gene Wolfe published in 1981 by Doubleday.

The stories within the collection are each paired with a holiday within the calendar year that is thematically linked to the content of the story. Thus, a story about the resurgence of slavery ("How the Whip Came Back") is dedicated to Lincoln's Birthday.

The material here was combined with The Castle of the Otter to make the volume Castle of Days.

== The stories (and their respective holidays) ==
- Date Due (No holiday assigned)
  - A story hidden in the introduction about a university student who steals books from his University Library.
- "How the Whip Came Back" (Lincoln's Birthday)
- "Of Relays and Roses" (Valentine's Day)
- "Paul's Treehouse" (Arbor Day)
- "St. Brandon" (St. Patrick's Day)
- "Beautyland" (Earth Day)
- "Car Sinister" (Mother's Day)
- "The Blue Mouse" (Armed Forces Day)
- "How I Lost the Second World War and Helped Turn Back the German Invasion" (Memorial Day)
- "The Adopted Father" (Father's Day)
- "Forlesen" (Labor Day)
- "An Article About Hunting" (the first day of hunting season)
- "The Changeling" (Homecoming Day)
- "Many Mansions" (Halloween)
- "Against the Lafayette Escadrille" (Armistice Day)
- "Three Million Square Miles" (Thanksgiving)
- "The War Beneath the Tree" (Christmas Eve)
- "La Befana" (Christmas Day)
- "Melting" (New Year's Eve)

== Reception ==
Dave Langford reviewed Gene Wolfe's Book of Days for White Dwarf #72, and stated that "Unclassifiable . . . some straight-forward, some worrying, some enigmatic and elusive, but all beautifully written."

== Reviews ==
- Review by Tom Easton (1981) in Analog Science Fiction/Science Fact, October 12, 1981
- Review by James J. J. Wilson (1981) in Science Fiction Review, Winter 1981
- Review by John Clute (1982) in The Magazine of Fantasy & Science Fiction, February 1982
- Review by K. V. Bailey (1986) in Paperback Inferno, #58
