= Soldier of the Mist =

1986 fantasy novel by Gene Wolfe

- First edition (UK)
- Author: Gene Wolfe
- Cover artist: Mark Harrison
- Language: English
- Series: Soldier
- Genre: Fantasy
- Publisher: Gollancz (UK); Tor (US)
- Publication date: October 1986 (UK); November 1986 (US)
- Publication place: United Kingdom
- Media type: Print (Hardback and paperback)
- Pages: 335 pp
- Award: Locus Award for Best Fantasy Novel (1987)
- ISBN: 0-575-03928-0
- Followed by: Soldier of Arete

Soldier of the Mist is a 1986 historical fantasy novel by American writer Gene Wolfe, published by Gollancz in the UK and then Tor Books in the US. It has two sequels: Soldier of Arete (1989) and Soldier of Sidon (2006). Soldier of the Mist and Soldier of Arete have been collected as Latro in the Mist.

== Setting ==
Soldier of the Mist and the sequel Soldier of Arete by Gene Wolfe follow the adventures of a foreign mercenary named Latro through Ancient Greece in 479 B.C. As the result of a head injury, he suffers from both retrograde (the inability to recall past memories) and anterograde (the inability to create new memories) amnesia. He comes from the north, yet has no memory of events prior to the beginning of the novel. The narrative follows his struggle to find his home and his friends.

Latro writes down the events he experiences, along with references to the various people, demigods and gods he encounter along the way, onto a scroll every day (or so we assume; however, there sometimes appear to be gaps in the narrative). He writes in his native tongue, a language no one he encounters seems to understand. Latro's ability to “see and talk with the gods and their companions” and to “penetrate at will the veil of the supernatural” is the compensation for his amnesia. He has in fact been cursed with this amnesia by the Great Mother (being both Demeter and Gaia), for an unknown insult, which is revealed later. Throughout the narrative, it becomes clear that the Great Mother and the Triple Goddess (Artemis / Hekate / Selene) are fighting, and both hope to use Latro as a pawn.

== Full Synopsis ==
=== Part I ===
Latro is given the scroll by a healer who hopes that it will help him combat his daily memory loss. Within the first few pages, Latro writes all that he knows, he has been injured fighting for the Great King (Xerxes I of Persia), in the Battle of Clay (Plataea), in which the Great King's army was defeated by Thought (Athens) and Rope (Sparta). He soon loses the people who were taking care of him and ends up in the company of the black man (who it is much later revealed is called Seven Lions) by a river where he sees his first god, a River God (Asopus). He offers his sword, Falcata, in sacrifice but the river-man returns her re-tempered with new strength.

Latro is taken to a temple of the Shining God (Apollo) in Hill (Thebes), where the priests argue about a prophecy carved in the walls which makes reference to Latro. While the priests listen to the prophetess, Apollo appears to Latro. Apollo cannot cure Latro but tells him that he must go to a shrine of the Earth Mother (Demeter). She took his memory in punishment for some offense, which Latro has forgotten, and he must beg forgiveness. Only when Latro has been forgiven can he be cured, and only when he is furthest from his home may he find it again.

The slave girl from the temple, named Io, claims that the prophetess told her to be Latro's slave, and to accompany him everywhere, yet it later turns out that she ran away of her own accord. Latro gained another companion, Pindaros (Pindar), who is a poet who was designated by the priests of Hill (Thebes) to take Latro to the shrine of the Earth Goddess. They are all caught up in the revels of the Kid (Dionysus), also known as the God in the Tree and the King from Nysa. Latro wakes up beside a woman, and he covers her before going to wash in the river, and he sees a woman on the opposite bank bathed in moonlight (we later find out this was Artemis). The woman he slept with was named Hilaeria, who asks to accompany them on their pilgrimage.

Latro, along with Io, the black man, Pindaros and Hilaeria are taken captive by the Rope Makers (Spartans). Latro discovers that if he touches a god, people can then see the god. He nudges a sleeping man who turns out to be the King of Nysa (Silenus, as opposed to Dionysus, who is the King from Nysa). Silenus asks Latro to sing to his accompaniment on the flute, and in doing so, Latro fulfills part of the prophecy from Hill (Thebes).

Latro sees a snake-woman, who seems to be invisible to all others, she asks him to give her a human. One of the Rope Makers’ slaves asks Latro to help them seek aid from the Great Mother (Demeter) in a planned uprising. Latro believes that it would be unsafe to refuse.

=== Part II ===
Latro wakes in Tower Hill (Corinth) to find himself slave to a merchant from Thought (Athens), Hypereides, who owned three ships and had fought in the Battle of Peace (Salamis). Although a prisoner, Latro travels untied in Hypereides’ largest ship, the Europa, as is the black man, although their friends, Pindaros, Hilaeria and Io are tied as they are from Cowland (Boeotia, ruled by Thebes).

Latro meets a man named Oior, who is one of the People of Scoloti. They agree to meet later in the evening. Meanwhile, Latro is approached by a woman with a snake skin wrapped around her waist, implying that despite the changes she is the same snake woman as before. She asks to be given Io as she does not eat normal food, she seems to be some form of vampire. She claims to be a servant of the Dark Goddess (Hecate).

Oior tells Latro the story of his people. He claims that one of the oarsmen on Hyperides’ ship is a cannibal sorcerer who means them harm. Latro agrees to help Oior kill the sorcerer, but someone tries to kill him first. Oior saves him and they swear to be blood brothers. Looking back, Latro sees Oior's face change to that of a “scholar of the worst kind” (p. 84), one who is corrupt.

A body washes up on shore, and is cremated. Latro meets a tall luminous figure (Hades), who raises the dead man from the burned out funeral pyre, and is accompanied by a dead bowman. This bowman killed the other dead man. Hades tells Latro that his wife (Persephone) would soon be sent to speak with Latro on behalf of her mother (Demeter). Latro then meets Europa, who was depicted on the figurehead and sails of Hyperides’ ship. Because he admired her, she promises to speak to the Great Mother on his behalf.

They put in at Peace to pick up some passengers or refugees to take them back to Thought (Athens), among whom are Kalleos, a madame, and her courtesans. Kalleos buys Latro from Hyperides to help rebuild her house and to serve as a bouncer.

Kalleos throws a party for Pindaros, Hyperides and Eurykles of Miletos, a necromancer, as well as a couple others. After games and drinking, Eurykles claims he can raise spirits from their graves. The men take a bet on it and venture to a burial ground close by with Latro as a guard. It was a trick set up by Kalleos and Eurykles. However they find a grave which has been dug up and the coffin smashed open, which scares away the girl Kalleos sent with them. Eurykles performs a ritual over the corpse, but to his surprise, when Latro touches the corpse it actually comes to life.

Along with Pindaros, Io and Hilaeria, Latro visits the Hall of the Great Mother in Advent (a small city near Athens). Hilaeria hopes to be initiated to the mysteries of the Grain Goddess (another aspect of Great Mother). Latro buys a bull to sacrifice. After the sacrifice, the priest notices that the statue of the goddess has moved, he tells Latro to spend the night in the temple.

=== Part III ===
The cooks talk about some Rope Makers (Spartans) they've heard of, who are making the rounds of the houses of Thought asking what people had for breakfast the previous day, clearly looking for a man with daily memory loss.

While Latro sweeps Kalleos’ house, a woman surprises him and takes him to bed. She tells him that he will remember her as she is “far lovelier than Kore, the Maiden”. She is Aphrodite, and she tells him the story of Myrrah, mother of Adonis, and of how Kore (Persephone) stole Adonis from her. She leaves Latro confused, and Kalleos takes him to bed with her.

Rope Makers (Spartans) led by a man named Eutaktos, knock at the door and ask Latro who sold him. When they find he doesn't know they ask if he has a book and Io shows it to them. Eurykles appears offering a tip about Latro, hoping to get rewarded, but as the Rope Makers had already found Latro they refuse to tip him, and instead take him prisoner. The Rope Makers leave Thought (Athens), taking Latro, Io and Eurykles with them. Basias, a soldier is assigned as their guard.

Latro leaves the campfire to talk to a woman he saw who introduces herself as Enodia, the Dark Mother (Hecate), also variously known as the Triple Goddess, Auge, the Huntress and Queen of the Neurians. She gives him a small snake and tells him to place it in a cup of wine, and give the cup to the man who has dedicated himself to her. Latro meets Eurykles (although he does not remember him and refers to him as the Milesian), and find out that he has been dedicated to the Triple Goddess since he was a child. Latro gives him the cup of wine with the snake.

The Rope Makers (Spartans) stop off in a village, where Eurykles wants a drink. Latro goes along and agrees to a wrestling match with Basias. A big man with a club (Hercules) appears while he's wrestling and gives him a couple tips, although he ultimately tells Latro to let Basias win.

Latro has a flash-back to the Battle of Clay (Plataea). He wakes up to a wet cloth on his forehead. A tall, ugly woman introduces herself as Eurykles. Io tells Latro that Eurykles is actually a man who wears a purple cloak. Eurykles writes a chapter, as Eutaktos thinks that writing in the scroll is disordering Latro's mind. Eurykles writes a bit about himself. Eurykles relates a dream Latro has about the god Aesculapius. Eurykles says that they are camped in Megara and that the following day they will be handed to the regent, Prince Pausanias, uncle of one of Sparta's two kings, King Pleistarchos. A runner, Pasicrates, arrives with a message from the regent. Pasicrates turns out to be the regent's protege. A tall woman in a purple cloak returns Latro his scroll, this woman is Eurykles, but now talks Latro about changing her name. They reach the Rope Makers’ encampment and are brought to the regent, Pausanias.

Pausanias had dreamed of Latro, Kore (Persephone) and Nike. Pausanias accuses Eurykles of being a spy. She gets angry, and bites Basias, his hand immediately begins to swell and go grey.

News arrives of a combined victory for Thought and Rope at the Battle of Mycale. A healer claims Basias was bitten by a viper. Latro and Io find out that they are headed to Rope and then to Acheron to consult the dead. Latro asks Eurykles why people call her by a man's name, and she avoids the question by deciding to change her name to Drakaina.

In a village in the Silent Country (Laconia) Latro encounters Cerdon again. Cerdon reminds Latro of his promise to help the slave uprising. Drakaina takes Latro to bed, and like the snake-woman from Part I, Drakaina has a snake skin tied around her waist. She claims a memory of sitting with Latro on a hillside.

Cerdon comes to fetch Latro but is bitten by a viper, and so Latro goes on alone. On his way he sees a lion and hears the singing of children. He sees a young girl sacrificed although he tried to save her. He does not release the Great Mother (Demeter) despite his promise, and suddenly the Rope Makers are there with Drakaina. The slaves disappear into the trees, regroup and attack the Rope Makers (Spartans). The blood from the battle revives the goddess, and she confronts Latro flanked by her lion and wolf. Latro touches her to make her visible and she asks one of her worshippers to sacrifice his privates to her in return for her aid to Pausanias.

Once in Rope, Latro, Io and Drakaina visit a temple dedicated to the Huntress (under the name of Orthia), where they meet Gorgo, a priestess who is mother to the king and cousin/aunt to the regent. Latro tells them that the Huntress is displeased with Drakaina, as her statue is glaring at her. Pasicrates shows them how they've imprisoned the Great King's (Xerxes I) messengers in a semi-dried well. Drakaina claims that Pausanias gave her presents and that her transformation from man to woman was the Huntress fulfilling her desire.

=== Part IV ===
Near the river Acheron (the river of woe), Pausanias makes a sacrifice. The spirit of King Cleomenes appears and speaks a prophecy via Drakaina's mouth advising peace with Thought, by sending them aid in their siege of Sestos. Pasicrates is to lead the force, and Latro, Io and Drakaina offer to go too. They hope that Latro's presence will end the siege. A ghost in the shape of the man Eurykles had walked in the wake of King Cleomenes.

Latro is invited to meet Pausanias’ soothsayer, Tisamenus of Elis. Latro later hears Tisamenus’ voice whispering to kill the man with the wooden foot.

In Tower Hill (Corinth), they have to wait for their ship to be allowed through the isthmus. To make a little money, Drakaina reveals to the city strategist, Corustas, that their ship, Nausicaa, is headed to Sestos.

While sailing, Latro asks who killed Basias (having read of him in the scroll) and Drakaina admits it was her. Latro falls overboard during a friendly wrestling match against Pasicrates, and meets Thoe, daughter of Nereus. She tries to seduce him and drown him, but he escapes and swims to shore.

The shore is that of the Hot Gates (Thermopylae), where Pasicrates planned to sacrifice. As he cuts the bull's neck, Latro appears. Latro completes the sacrifice. Latro walks with Pasicrates, and he sees a vision, which may be more like a memory, of the Battle of Thermopylae, in which he is leading some men who speak his own tongue.

They land, march to Sestos and make camp alongside the soldiers of Thought (Athens). Although the Rope Makers (Spartans) have come to help Thought with the siege, the alliance is uneasy, and there is a certain amount of dislike.

Latro, Io and Drakaina accompany Pasicrates to visit Xanthippos, the strategist of Thought. Pasicrates quizzes him on his plans and expectations for the progress of the siege. After leaving him, as they assess the siege towers and battering rams, Drakaina says she was once a Princess of Aea (Colchis) when the Golden Fleece was there. In one of the towers they discover their friend, the black man.

Drakaina speaks the black man's language and gives his back story, and Pasicrates hopes to send him into the city to start a revolt. Hypereides and Oior are there too.

Returning to their camp, Pasicrates decides that Latro should be disciplined, and tries to have him beaten. Latro fights his way out and runs into the hills.

Latro wakes to find the Maiden (Persephone) seated by him. She scolds him for running, but says she will keep her promise to reunite him with his friends, in return for the sacrifice of a wolf. Latro finds Drakaina and Io in the shadows of the city walls and the three of them are taken hostage into the city.

The People from Parsa bring Latro to Artaÿctes, the satrap in charge of Sestos, and they make Latro fight three men at once. Latro asks for the Maiden's help, two ghosts appear, as blood is spilled one drinks, gains strength and slows one of Latro's opponents. The ghost who drank is Odysseus and the other Achilles.

Artayctes says he plans to sneak out the city with his people, to return to the Great King (Xerxes I) and invites Latro to join him, Latro accepts and arms himself. He rides a horse with Drakaina seated behind him, having left Io behind. It was a trick, they are ambushed, and the satrap left another way.

Latro loses track of time, looking for Drakaina, he sees her body being mauled by an injured wolf with the face of a man who reminds him they were brothers (it was Oior), and begs him to end his life. Latro sacrifices the wolf-man to the Maiden. From Drakaina's mouth escapes a snake. Once it is gone, the woman tells Latro her name is Eurykles.

A dying man calls for ‘Lucius’, and Latro recognises his own name, he holds his friend's hand as the man dies.

== Reception ==
Soldier of the Mist won the 1987 Locus Award for Best Fantasy Novel, and was nominated for the Nebula Award for Best Novel and the World Fantasy Award.

Dave Langford reviewed Soldier of the Mist for White Dwarf #85, and stated that "Soldier is vintage Wolfe: beautifully told, infuriatingly enigmatic, and certainly not to be unravelled on the basis of the first book alone. You will hear more of this."

Wendy Graham reviewed Soldier of the Mist for Adventurer magazine and stated that "It's not as satisfactory: elusive and strange, its full significance will not become clear until the final page of the final volume. But it certainly has something..."

Kirkus Reviews described it as "marvelously fluent" and "evocative", while Space Gamer/Fantasy Gamer commented that readers would "either enjoy (the book) immensely or dislike (it) almost as strongly", and called it one "of life's wonders."
