= Peace (novel) =

1975 psychological fantasy/ghost story novel by Gene Wolfe

- First edition
- Author: Gene Wolfe
- Genre: Fantasy
- Publisher: Harper & Row
- Publication date: 1975
- Media type: Print
- Pages: 264
- ISBN: 0-06-014699-0

Peace is a 1975 psychological fantasy/ghost story novel by American writer Gene Wolfe. It is the story of a man from a small Midwestern town in the early to mid-20th century, Alden Dennis Weer, who narrates various memories from different parts of his life, including his childhood, early adulthood, and middle to old age.

Wolfe has described Peace as his favorite of his own work, as it is the one where he came closest to achieving his original goals. Neil Gaiman, who has frequently praised the novel, said: "Peace really was a gentle Midwestern memoir the first time I read it. It only became a horror novel on the second or the third reading."

== Style and interpretations ==
Unlike much of Wolfe's work, Peace is a standalone novel set in a somewhat contemporary time and place (as opposed to the future or an imaginary world). Despite this, the story of the novel is one of Wolfe's strangest and most difficult; the narrator's consciousness at times seems to transcend time and space, as if he is narrating from beyond our plane of reality. One interpretation is that the narrator, Weer, is dead, and the scattered memories are those of a ghost; in 2014, Wolfe confirmed that this was his intention. In a 1980 interview, he described the plot of Peace as:

...it isn't a plotting book … The basic idea is that a man has died and he is haunting his own mind, his own past. This is something very few people seem to understand about Peace. If you'll notice the opening line of the book is ‘The elm tree planted by Eleanor Bold, the judge's daughter, fell last night.’ And, in the closing chapters of the book, Eleanor Bold comes to him and requests permission to plant an elm on his grave when he dies (she's on a reforestation kick or something) and of course, the old legend is – if there's a tree on a grave, when the tree falls, the falling of the tree releases a ghost on the Earth. In Peace that ghost prowls through his memories throughout the book.

Different critics interpret differently what is actually happening in the novel, and another interpretation is that the memories of his old age are the fantasies of a middle-aged Weer, who is experiencing a nervous breakdown. The novel includes subtle clues to guide the reader's understanding of the story, although the mysteries behind these clues have been hotly debated.

As in many of Wolfe's novels, much of Peace is taken up with stories within stories, particularly stories told to Weer as a child. Many of the key events of the novel are not explicitly narrated, but can be inferred or guessed at based on information in the stories-within-stories.
