= Pope Sixtus =

Pope Sixtus or Xystus is the name of five Popes of the Catholic Church:

- Pope Sixtus I (saint; ca. 115/119–ca. 125/128)
- Pope Sixtus II (saint; 257–258)
- Pope Sixtus III (saint; 432–440)
- Pope Sixtus IV (1471–1484)
- Pope Sixtus V (1585–1590)
