= The Knight (novel) =

2004 fantasy novel by Gene Wolfe

- First Edition
- Author: Gene Wolfe
- Cover artist: Gregory Manchess
- Language: English
- Series: The Wizard Knight
- Genre: Fantasy
- Publisher: Tor Books
- Publication date: January 3rd 2004
- Publication place: United States
- Media type: Print (Hardback and Paperback)
- Pages: 432
- ISBN: 0-7653-0989-0
- OCLC: 52943139
- Dewey Decimal: 813/.54 22
- LC Class: PS3573.O52 K58 2004
- Followed by: The Wizard

The Knight is a fantasy novel written by American author Gene Wolfe. It depicts the journey of an American boy transported to a magical realm and aged to adulthood who soon thereafter becomes a knight. The first of a two-part tale known collectively as The Wizard Knight is told in an epistolary style, and contains elements from Norse, Arthurian, and Christian Mythology. It received a nomination for the Nebula Award in 2005.

== Plot summary ==
The story opens with an older narrator recounting a great adventure. He is left alone in a cabin in the wilderness by himself for a few days. He goes for a hike and ends up chasing a flying castle he sees in the sky until he is abducted by "a lot of people". He awakens to find himself at the mouth of a cave by the sea. He is greeted by a fortune teller who calls him Able of the High Heart and turns his walking stick into a bow. He soon after discovers his chivalrous destiny and embarks on a quest to travel this strange new land.
