= A Borrowed Man =

Novel by Gene Wolfe

- Hardcover edition
- Author: Gene Wolfe
- Language: English
- Genre: Fiction
- Publisher: Tor Books
- Publication date: 20 October 2015
- Publication place: United States
- Media type: Print (Hardback)
- Pages: 304 pp.
- ISBN: 978-0765381149

A Borrowed Man is a 2015 science fiction hardboiled noir novel by Gene Wolfe.

== Plot ==
In the 22nd century, Ern A. Smithe is a "reclone" of a mystery writer, embedded with the recorded memories of his original and stored in a library where patrons can consult or borrow him. He is checked out by a woman who hopes that he can help solve the deaths of her father and brother, because her father's safe had contained nothing except one of Smithe's novels. However, Smithe's original was not a detective, only someone who wrote about them — and his knowledge of the world is over a century out of date.

== Reception ==
At Strange Horizons, John Clute stated that it was "almost (...) the saddest story I have ever heard", and "not (...) quite the most adamantly terminal novel Gene Wolfe has ever written", noting that its many apparent stylistic flaws are deliberate (for instance, Smithe's narration is in the style of a hardboiled mystery because, as a reclone, his speech production has been artificially constrained). Clute also observed that the name "Ern A. Smithe" can be parsed as "an urn in which a smith resides, a maker you can rent". In the Chicago Tribune, Gary K. Wolfe praised the novel's "tantalizing" depiction of the "oddly dystopian future" in which the book is set, while the Los Angeles Review of Books felt that it was "a lonely book haunted only by metaphorical specters" and recommended it as "intriguing and rewarding", "fast paced and lively, quite accessible", while conceding that it may not "represent the author at the peak of his powers, or at his most complex".

Publishers Weekly called it "a strange, unsettling story, deceptively simple and old-fashioned in style and plot". At Tangent Online, Dave Truesdale described it as "well-designed 50/50 marriage of 1930s pulpish SF and the now classic noir detective murder mystery formula first given us by Dashiell Hammett", and "a rejuvenating reminder of that glorious and (dare I say it) naive time when SF was new, the dreams were large, and the ideas wild", but noted that although the novel "pays respectful homage to, and has fun with, the now classic detective murder mystery", it is not "a noir novel in the classic sense ". Tor.com's Niall Alexander however, felt it to be "middling", with a "morally abhorrent" setting and "too much (...) meandering misdirection", and "the most fascinating thing" being Smithe's narrative voice.

== Sequel ==
In 2015, Wolfe announced that he was writing a sequel to A Borrowed Man, to be titled Interlibrary Loan, but he specified that he "[hadn't] finished it yet, and it may not be published". Neil Gaiman stated that Wolfe had turned over Interlibrary Loan to his publisher before his death.

It was released by Macmillan in June 2020 and became a 2021 Locus Award finalist.

== Reviews ==
- Sakers, Don (October 2015). "The Reference Library". Analog Science Fiction and Fact. 135 (10): 105–108.
