= Operation Ares =

1970 novel by Gene Wolfe

- First edition
- Author: Gene Wolfe
- Cover artist: Paul Lehr
- Language: English
- Genre: Science fiction
- Publisher: Berkley Books
- Publication date: 1970
- Publication place: United States
- Media type: Print (Hardcover, Paperback)
- Pages: 208
- OCLC: 225240530

Operation Ares is a science fiction novel by American writer Gene Wolfe, published as a paperback original by Berkley Books in 1970. It was his first novel. While no later editions were issued in the United States, a hardcover edition was released in the UK market by Dobson Books in 1977, followed by a Fontana paperback in 1978. The title is sometimes rendered Operation ARES.

The novel originated from a short story written by Wolfe in 1965. He submitted the story to Damon Knight, who suggested that Wolfe expand it into a novel. Wolfe completed the novel, then titled The Laughter at Night in 1967, and sold it to Berkley Books. Wolfe and his editor, Donald R. Bensen, cut about 20% of the manuscript's 100,000-word length for publication.

Operation Ares depicts a dystopian future where the United States is controlled by an anti-technological leftist regime. The story traces protagonist John Castle's conflict with the government and his increasing involvement with a rebellion backed by a Martian colony which has severed its ties to the U.S. government. While occasionally cited as a libertarian text, Wolfe himself attributes its politics to his being "much more a doctrinaire conservative when I was a good deal younger.

== Reception ==
Joanna Russ found the novel unsatisfying, saying "I know what Mr. Wolfe can do when he sets his mind to it; Ares is far below his best." She described it as "a convincing, quiet, low-keyed, intelligent book which somehow fades out into nothing" and, despite praising Wolfe's technique, concluded it was "a failure, shadowy and inconclusive."

Larry McCaffery characterized Ares as "a generally undistinguished first novel."

in 2007, Wolfe said "I don't think Operation Ares is a very good novel," adding that in 1970, he "wasn't really skillful enough to write a good novel."
