= Innocents Aboard =

2004 short story collection by Gene Wolfe

- First edition (publ. Tor Books); Cover art by René Magritte; Le Château des Pyrénées (1949)
- Author: Gene Wolfe
- Genre: Fantasy; Horror
- Publisher: Tor Books
- Publication date: 2004
- ISBN: 978-0-7653-0790-3

Innocents Aboard is a 2004 short story collection by American science fiction and fantasy author Gene Wolfe. The stories are primarily fantasy or horror, not science-fiction. The title is a homage to Mark Twain's first book, The Innocents Abroad. The book was nominated for a Locus Award in 2005.

== List of stories ==
- The Tree Is My Hat
- The Old Woman Whose Rolling Pin Is the Sun
- The Friendship Light
- Slow Children At Play
- Under Hill
- The Monday Man
- The Waif
- The Legend of Xi Cygnus
- The Sailor Who Sailed After the Sun
- How the Bishop Sailed to Inniskeen
- Houston, 1943
- A Fish Story
- Wolfer
- The Eleventh City
- The Night Chough (related to The Book of the Long Sun)
- The Wrapper
- A Traveler in Desert Lands
- The Walking Sticks
- Queen
- Pocketsful of Diamonds
- Copperhead
- The Lost Pilgrim
