= There Are Doors =

1988 novel by Gene Wolfe

Cover of the first edition, published by Tor Books. Art by Richard Bober.

There Are Doors is a speculative fiction novel by American writer Gene Wolfe, published in 1988. The narrative follows a department store salesman as he tries to track down his short-lived girlfriend. The title alludes to gateways between two worlds whose nature are explored throughout the book. There Are Doors was nominated for a Locus Fantasy Award in 1988.

== Plot summary ==
Mr. Green awakes to find that his girlfriend, Lara Morgan, has left their apartment. He battles a hangover to find a cryptic note left by her, dispensing little but a warning against entering certain "significant" doors and nonsensical instructions for leaving them if passed through. Green immediately leaves to search for the woman, whom he has known for only a few days but has already grown to love. His quest takes him through one such door to an alternate world, made apparent to Green by conspicuous elements such as its unusual currency. An accident lands Green in a psychiatric hospital, where he meets a radical from his world using the name William North (a patient), a boxer named Joe Joseph and his manager Eddie Walsh (also a patient).

North organizes an escape from the Hospital, accompanied by Green and exploited by Walsh, who makes his own escape. The two take refuge at the Grand Hotel in the outskirts of the city, while Green begins to realize what a dangerous man he has been indebted to. North brings him to a play accompanied by members of his revolutionary group which is raided by police. Green and North narrowly escape capture and death, though they lose each other.

Green returns to his hotel paranoid of capture by the police. He finds that the doctor he consults for minor burns suffered during the raid and subsequent fire at the theater, the waitress at the hotel restaurant, and even the stylist at the hair salon beneath it all seem to work for the police organization that is tracking him. He leaves the hotel hoping to learn more, but is locked out upon his return and must accept a car ride from the waitress, Fanny. They go to an Italian restaurant which Green recognizes as being from his world. He and Fanny discuss the little they know about North's gang, the two worlds, and Lara.

The alternate world is nearly identical to his, the one of contemporary America, save for a few societal and physical disparities. The people from "There" (as Green comes to think of it) are physically identical to those from Here, but for that the men naturally die from sex. Technology seems to be generally inferior There, although some anomalies such as seemingly magical and remarkably articulate robotic dolls exist, perhaps invented to suit matriarchal needs. Roads and buildings seem to be in similar places, though occupied by different establishments and patrons. Time passes much more quickly Here, although they both seem to be in the same general era. There is no indication when passing between the worlds, though the doors between them seem to be accessible only to certain people and those who they know. Objects can accompany people between the worlds, though they may eventually filter themselves back to the world of their origin.

When they leave the restaurant, Green returns to his own world through its door, but Fanny inadvertently follows Lara's aforementioned instructions and remains in her own. Green finds that, though he had only been in the alternate world for perhaps four days, he has been missing from his own for over a month. He is told that he must receive a medical checkup before he can return to work, and in doing so it is revealed that he has now made eight visits to a psychiatrist for a "breakdown". He is hospitalized, but released after admitting that the alternate world was most likely a dream. Over the next few years he returns to his previous life as a salesman, forgetting about Lara and There.

He is briefly returned to the other world while shopping and is reminded of its existence. Shortly after returning to his world he is contacted by Lara. They meet at the Italian restaurant and, after some coaxing, she reveals more to him about herself and the other world. Throughout the story Green had been exposed to hints that his girlfriend exists in both worlds. She had appeared as a doll he found in the other world, on his television at the first hospital, stepdaughter of Klamm (presidential cabinet member searching for North), as a famous actress and model There, and was also referred to There as 'the goddess'. Now she had taken the alias of receptionist Lora Masterman at his psychiatrist's office. She admits to being an immortal being from the other world, occasionally joining his world to enjoy relationships with men she could sleep with without killing, such as Green, Klamm, and a 19th-century sea captain.

Lara flees Green through the restaurant's door and they reenter the alternate world. They reunite at a boxing match where Joe is attempting to take the heavyweight title and North is using as a political publicity stunt. North interrupts the fight with gunshots, perhaps attempting to kill Green, but is subdued by Joe after a brief brawl. Green is taken to a hospital for injuries sustained and reunites with Fanny. She is instructed to keep watch of him, but he escapes her vise. The novel ends with Green exiting the city in a cab, still in the alternate world, eager to start a new life devoid of the burdens of his old.

== Characterization ==
Wolfe has stated that he designed the protagonist, Green, to be a mediocre person: "He has almost no virtues. By that I don't mean that he has many vices, but he is... not outstanding in any good way. He is a man of very limited intelligence, not terribly courageous, not terribly energetic or enterprising or any of those other things."

The character William North was named after Oliver North but is loosely based on G. Gordon Liddy

The character Lara is Wolfe's conception of what a pagan goddess would be if she had persisted into a Christian world.

== Publication Information ==
- ISBN 0-312-87230-5
