= Home Fires (novel) =

2011 science fiction novel by Gene Wolfe

First edition

Home Fires is a 2011 science fiction novel by Gene Wolfe. It was published by Tor Books.

== Synopsis ==
Twenty years ago, when Skip and Chelle were poor university students in love, they devised a plan: she would join the army and fight in a war on an alien planet, and he would stay home and study. Then, when her tour of duty finished and she returned to Earth, time dilation would mean that she was barely two years older; meanwhile, twenty years would have passed for him, during which he could become a wealthy lawyer, so that he could take her as a trophy wife. However, now that she has returned, they have both found that their plan had certain flaws.

== Reception ==
Kirkus Reviews considered the book to be "complex", "enigmatic", and "compelling", with "(a) somber, almost brooding tone". The A.V. Club found that the basic concept was "outstanding", as was the relationship between Skip and Chelle, but doubted that this was enough to carry an entire novel. Strange Horizons described it as "unusual, complex, and a constant challenge to the reader", and commended Wolfe for minimalistic worldbuilding, noting that the absence of any detailed explanations meant that the novel was able to portray an energy-poor society which nonetheless was capable of interstellar travel at relativistic speeds.
