= Free Live Free =

1984 novel by Gene Wolfe

- First (limited) edition
- Author: Gene Wolfe
- Cover artist: Carl Lundgren
- Language: English
- Genre: Science fiction
- Publisher: Mark V. Ziesing
- Publication date: 1984
- Publication place: United States
- Media type: Print (hardback & paperback)
- Pages: 496
- ISBN: 0-9612970-1-8

Free Live Free is a novel by American writer Gene Wolfe, first published in 1984.

== Plot ==
Mr. Free has a house which is slated for demolition. He puts an ad in a newspaper advertising free living quarters to anyone who helps him find a mysterious lost object hidden in the house. Four strangers (a mystic, a private eye, a prostitute, and a salesman) arrive.

== Publishing history ==
The novel was initially published as a limited edition small press item in 1984, then mass market published by Gollancz in 1985. In 1999, it was republished by Tor Books, with an appendix intended to "untangle some of the more serpentine elements of the plot."

== Reception ==
In Starburst, David Langford called Free Live Free a "fine, delightful book", while emphasizing that it is ultimately "unclassifiable".

Dave Langford reviewed Free Live Free for White Dwarf #71, and stated that "the final surprises aren't even the kind of surprises anticipated. I refuse to say more. It's a breath of fresh air. Read it."

Kirkus Reviews described it as "an uneasy, lurching mix of fantasy, science fiction, and mystery", stated that the conclusion was "a bust", and asked why Wolfe "can't put together a book that fully convinces and satisfies."

Wendy Graham reviewed Free Live Free for Adventurer magazine and stated that "Starts well this book, but by the time the finale approached I was still reading it pretty much for the sake of finally finishing it - you know the Mastermind Syndrome, 'I've started so I'll finish'. A nice idea which got buried under a blanket of over-convolution."

At the SF Site, Jean-Louis Trudel called it "deeply engaging", with "a compassion not always evident in Wolfe's other books", but felt that its conclusion was "a bit of a letdown", with certain revelations and explanations being "not entirely persuasive".

CNN states that it is "outrageous", "ingenious", "highly entertaining", and "masterful", but concedes that the ending is not only "contrived", but "confusing", and that only "Wolfe's mastery of the written word" prevents the novel from being entirely burlesque.
