= The Island of Doctor Death and Other Stories and Other Stories =

1980 short story collection by Gene Wolfe

- First edition
- Author: Gene Wolfe
- Cover artist: Don Maitz
- Language: English
- Genre: Science fiction and fantasy short stories
- Publisher: Pocket Books
- Publication date: 1980
- Publication place: United States
- Media type: Print (hardback & paperback)

The Island of Doctor Death and Other Stories and Other Stories is a short story collection by American science fiction author Gene Wolfe.

The title story of the collection is "The Island of Doctor Death and Other Stories", which recounts the fantasies of a dreamy young boy who is reading a lurid pulp science fiction novel modeled after The Island of Doctor Moreau. The collection also includes "The Death of Dr. Island" and "The Doctor of Death Island". Also included are "The Eyeflash Miracles" and "Seven American Nights", two stories which were nominated for the Nebula Awards. Among the remaining stories were "Tracking Song", "Alien Stones", "The Hero as Werwolf" [sic], "Feather Tigers", and "The Toy Theater".

== Contents ==
- "The Island of Doctor Death and Other Stories" (1970)
- "Alien Stones" (1972)
- "La Befana" (1973)
- "The Hero As Werwolf" (1975)
- "Three Fingers" (1976)
- "The Death of Dr. Island" (1973)
- "Feather Tigers" (1973)
- "Hour of Trust" (1973)
- "Tracking Song" (1975)
- "The Toy Theater" (1971)
- "The Doctor of Death Island" (1978)
- "Cues" (1974)
- "The Eyeflash Miracles" (1976)
- "Seven American Nights" (1978)
