= The Land Across =

2013 novel by Gene Wolfe

- Author: Gene Wolfe
- Language: English
- Publication date: 2013

The Land Across is a fantasy novel by Gene Wolfe published in 2013 by Tor Books.

== Synopsis ==
Grafton is a travel writer who decides to write the first ever travel guide to "the land beyond the mountains", an otherwise-unnamed Eastern European nation that is almost impossible to reach.

== Reception ==
Gary K. Wolfe describes Across as reminiscent of Kafka, and of "classic horror fiction", while specifying that it "never stops being compelling" and is a "tribute to Wolfe's narrative virtuosity". Similarly, Alan Cheuse called it "strange and engrossing".

Charlie Jane Anders considered it "charming, not to mention thrilling", with "some real poetry and some great moments of describing people", but conceded that the plot "(felt) somewhat random" and was "really hard to summarize". At Tor.com, Mordicai Knode noted that the Latin for "across" and "beyond" is "trans", and combined this with the novel being set in Eastern Europe to conclude that it is "Wolfe's Transylvania novel"; he also posited connections to The Third Policeman.
