= The Sorcerer's House =

2010 fantasy novel by Gene Wolfe

- First edition cover
- Author: Gene Wolfe
- Language: English
- Publisher: Tor Books
- Publication date: 2010
- ISBN: 978-0-7653-2458-0 (first edition)
- Dewey Decimal: 813.54
- LC Class: PS3573.O52 S67

The Sorcerer's House is a 2010 epistolary fantasy novel by Gene Wolfe. It was published by Tor Books.

== Synopsis ==
When ex-convict Baxter Dunn squats in an abandoned house in the town of Medicine Man, he discovers numerous strange and supernatural phenomena–not least of which is that he has been retroactively declared the house's legal owner.

== Reception ==
Publishers Weekly called House "a complex, spellbinding web", and "a book of wonders" that "speaks eloquently about the nature of responsibility and family", but faulted the "rushed, incoherent ending", and the extent to which many characters were stereotypes; similarly, at io9, Charlie Jane Anders emphasized that the novel was "really splendid", with "more than enough cleverness and fun", but described House as "pretty much lightweight fluff" when compared to other works by Wolfe, and stated that it "runs out of narrative steam towards the end", while Fantasy Magazine specified that although it was an "excellent novel" which was "quite absorbing", it was also "by Wolfe's standards, fairly simple", and "not great Wolfe, but good Wolfe".

Pop Matters commended Wolfe for the novel's accessibility and readability, deeming it an excellent introduction to Wolfe's writing, and noted that since House is set in the present day, no lexicon is required (unlike with many of Wolfe's other novels). Locus's Paul Witcover, however, concluded that House would be a disappointment even for Wolfe aficionados, as it has "all of Wolfe's [stylistic] tics (...) on full display", and that despite having a "tangled and complicated" plot with "cunning complexity and (an) intricately woven web of circumstance and identity", the novel is "essentially sterile".
