= The Book of the Long Sun =

Science fantasy novels by Gene Wolfe

- Front cover of the first half or first two books in one volume (Orb Books, 2000)
- Author: Gene Wolfe
- Series: Solar Cycle
- Publisher: Tor / Tom Doherty
- Publication date: 1993–1996 (four vols)
- Preceded by: Book of the New Sun sub-series.
- Followed by: Book of the Short Sun sub-series.

The Book of the Long Sun (1993–1996) is a series of four science fantasy novels or one four-volume novel by the American author Gene Wolfe. It is set in the same universe as The Book of the New Sun series that Wolfe inaugurated in 1980, and the Internet Science Fiction Database catalogs them both as sub-series of the "Solar Cycle", along with other writings.

The Long Sun story is continued in The Book of the Short Sun (1999–2001), a series of three novels or one in three volumes. In Short Sun the relation to the original New Sun is made clear.

The Mythopoeic Society considered The Book of the Sun as a whole for annual literary awards. It was one of five finalists for the Mythopoeic Fantasy Award in 1997. Locus magazine and the SFWA considered the volumes separately for "Best Novel" awards. (Note: The Long Sun books won ranks 23, none, 9, and 10 in the Locus Science Fiction polls (where New Sun books won two firsts and two seconds as Fantasy novels). The first and third volumes were among six finalists for annual Nebula Awards (as were all New Sun books, winning the award once).)

== Synopsis ==
Patera Silk, a young priest, tries to save his manteion (neighborhood church and school) from destruction by a ruthless crime lord. As he learns more about his world, he begins to question his beliefs and to revere the minor god known as The Outsider who has enlightened him.

== Titles ==
The working title for the series was Starcrosser's Landfall, and dust jacket mockups of the first volume were printed with that title. At the end of the final volume in a penultimate section called “My Defense”, the fictional author refers to it alternately as The Book of the Long Sun, Starcrosser's Landfall, and The Book of Silk.

In the event, The Book of the Long Sun was published in four volumes, almost simultaneously in the U.S. (Tor Books imprint, Tom Doherty Associates) and U.K. (New English Library imprint, Hodder & Stoughton). The Tor hardcover editions (see table) were almost 1500 pages long in sum.

First editions (United States)
Title, Imprint, Date	ISBN	Notes
Nightside the Long Sun Tor Books, 1993	0-312-85207-X	Nebula Award for Best Novel, one of six finalists
Lake of the Long Sun Tor Books, 1994	0-312-85494-3	
Caldé of the Long Sun Tor Books, 1994	0-312-85583-4	Locus Award for Best Fantasy Novel, rank 9 Nebula Award finalist
Exodus from the Long Sun Tor Books, 1996	0-312-85585-0	Locus Fantasy Novel, rank 10

In the U.S., both the first two books when available in 1994 and the last two in 1997 were bound together by a science fiction book club ("GuildAmerica Books / SFBC" in ISFDB). There is a two-volume trade paperback edition of the whole since November 2000 (Orb Books imprint, Tom Doherty). The Orb editions run 543 and 718 pages and ISFDB lists no single-volume edition.

Two-volume edition (United States)
Title, Imprint, Date	ISBN	Notes
Litany of the Long Sun Orb Books, 2000	0-312-87291-7	The Book of the Long Sun, books 1 and 2
Epiphany of the Long Sun Orb Books, 2000	0-312-86072-2	The Book of the Long Sun, books 3 and 4

== Main characters ==
The names of people from Silk's home city of Viron follow rigid conventions. Male humans are named after an animal or animal product: 'Blood,' 'Musk,' 'Quetzal,' etc. Female humans are named after a plant or plant product: 'Chenille,' 'Orchid,' 'Hyacinth,' etc. Androids (known in the book as "chems") are named for inanimate minerals and rocks: 'Marble,' 'Sand,' 'Schist,' etc.

=== Patera Silk ===
Patera Silk begins the tetralogy as the 23-year-old Augur of the Sun Street Manteion, arguably the poorest manteion in Viron. Augurs, in the religion of Silk's city, Viron, sacrifice animals to the gods, and examine the entrails of these sacrifices to seek knowledge about the future of the person who has provided the sacrifice, and the future of the augur. He believes himself to be "enlightened" by a minor deity known as the Outsider, who charges Silk to save his manteion, which has been sold to the crime lord Blood for tax reasons. His quest to save the manteion starts him on a journey into Viron's underworld. In the first book in the tetralogy, Nightside the Long Sun, Silk begins to question his own moral fiber as he engages in various "immoral" acts for the sake of this quest.

His theophanies continue, and Patera Silk eventually develops a large following because of his continued contact with the gods of Viron. He becomes a popular hero, and with the help of a spy named Doctor Crane, he is elevated to the political position of Caldé, the high administrator of Viron. It is later discovered that Patera Silk is the rightful heir to this position, having been secretly named successor by the previous Caldé, Tussah (Silk's adoptive father), before he was assassinated by the oligarchical councilors of the Ayuntamiento, another governing body of Viron.

Silk eventually marries the ex-prostitute Hyacinth and journeys with Auk to the city mainframe, where the whorl's main computer is housed. During this trip he goes through a brief suicidal crisis, and comes to final conclusions about the moral doubts that he possessed during the earlier parts of the series.

When The Book of the Long Sun concludes, Patera Silk's fate is unknown.

Silk is an allegorical character, as is typical for Wolfe's work. He is often associated with Moses.

=== Maytera Marble ===
Maytera Marble is a chemical citizen of Viron, or a "chem." This means that she is a robot who possesses a self-aware, sentient mind. Maytera Marble was initially designed to be a maid, but as her life progressed she found a more religious calling and became one of the Sibyls at Patera Silk's Sun Street Manteion. Being over three hundred years old, certain body parts of hers have been replaced and others have worn away. At the beginning of the tetralogy, her functions have so decayed that she can no longer remember her precise age. Marble is Silk's main confidante at the manteion, Maytera Rose being too harsh for him and Maytera Mint initially too shy.

Later in the series she reclaims several prosthetic parts from the dead Sibyl Maytera Rose, which causes her to obtain some of Rose's memories, resulting in an identity crisis of sorts.

Maytera Marble eventually claims that her real name is Molybdenum, with the short nickname Moly, so that she can marry the soldier Hammerstone and begin constructing a daughter. Evidently she was originally a maid at the manteion and the death of a sibyl necessitated that she take vows. Patera Quetzal releases her from her service so that she can be wed to Corporal Hammerstone. However, as predicted by Silk, she later reveals that her name is in fact Maggie, or Magnesia, and she lied about being Moly so that Hammerstone would marry her.

=== Maytera Mint ===
Maytera Mint is one of the sibyls of the Sun Street manteion. Initially rather shy, her concern starts the relationship between Patera Silk and the sneak-thief Auk. She is eventually inhabited by a piece of the deity Kypris, goddess of love. Kypris does not completely possess Maytera Mint, and the incomplete personality transfer gives Maytera Mint a newfound assertiveness.

At the funeral sacrifice for Maytera Rose, Maytera Mint presides over the sacrifices because Patera Silk has not yet returned from being captured by the Ayuntamiento. There is a theophany, during which the queen goddess Echidna appears and proclaims Mint to be her "sword" in the revolution against the Ayuntamiento. Leading a band of dissatisfied citizens, she becomes General Mint in Silk's army, facing off against the City Guard and eventually Viron's force of chem "soldiers."

=== Auk ===
Auk is introduced as a friend of Maytera Mint's from the manteion who needs spiritual guidance. When Silk speaks with him, he discovers that Auk is a criminal and involved with the prostitute Chenille. Auk counsels Silk on how to break into Blood's mansion. Later, Auk travels in the tunnels under Viron with Chenille, seeking Silk, and suffers a wound to the head. The god Tartaros enters Auk's mind and fixes the damage to his brain, making Auk a prophet of Tartaros in the process. Tartaros guides Auk out of the tunnels and eventually instructs him in guiding people to leave the whorl. When Patera Silk and his retinue travel to Mainframe, the home of the gods, Auk takes a landing craft that heads away from the Whorl.

== Other reading ==
- "Five Steps Towards Briah: Gene Wolfe's The Book of the Long Sun" by Nick Gevers in Nova Express, Volume 5 Number 1, 1998
- Backstab #11 - review of Exodus from the Long Sun (as "L'Exode")
