= The Book of the Short Sun =

Science fantasy novels by Gene Wolfe

- First omnibus edition
- Author: Gene Wolfe
- Cover artist: Jim Burns
- Series: Solar Cycle
- Publisher: Tor Books; Science Fiction Book Club (omnibus)
- Publication date: 1999–2001 (three vols)
- Pages: 752 (2001 omnibus)
- Preceded by: Book of the Long Sun sub-series.

The Book of the Short Sun (1999–2001) is a series of three science fantasy novels or one three-volume novel by the American author Gene Wolfe. It continues The Book of the Long Sun (1993–1996): they share a narrator and Short Sun recounts a search for Silk, the Long Sun hero. The two works are set in the same universe as The Book of the New Sun series that Wolfe inaugurated in 1980 and the Internet Speculative Fiction Database (ISFDB) catalogs all three as sub-series of the "Solar Cycle", along with some other writings.

Locus: The Magazine of the Science Fiction & Fantasy Field considered the three Short Sun volumes separately for annual "Best Novel" awards. (Note: The Short Sun books won ranks 8, 5, and 4 in the Locus Science Fiction polls --where the original New Sun books had won two firsts and two seconds as Fantasy novels and the Long Sun books had placed 23, unranked, 9, and 10.)

== Titles ==
The "Short Sun" of the title is an ordinary star, in contrast to the "Long Sun" of the Whorl where the narrator grew up. Most of the story takes place in a star system with two habitable planets, Blue and Green, which lend their names to the first two volumes. The Whorl of volume three's title is the generation ship setting of Long Sun.

The Tor hardcover editions (see table) were almost 1200 pages long in sum.

First editions (United States)
Title, Imprint, Date	ISBN	Notes
On Blue's Waters Tor Books, 1999	0-312-86614-3	Locus Award for Best Fantasy Novel, rank 8
In Green's Jungles Tor Books, 2000	0-312-87315-8	Locus Fantasy Novel, rank 5
Return to the Whorl Tor Books, 2001	0-312-87314-X	Locus Fantasy Novel, rank 4

Science Fiction Book Club released a 752-page omnibus edition only two months after the third volume was published.

Omnibus edition
Title, Imprint, Date	ISBN	Notes
The Book of the Short Sun Science Fiction Book Club, 2001	0-7394-1689-8	

== Plot introduction ==
The story, which is told by a narrator who identifies himself as Horn (the ostensible author of The Book of the Long Sun), is an account of a search "on three worlds" for Silk, the hero of the Long Sun cycle. However, the narrator's adventures continue as he writes, so that the manuscript is both a memoir of his past and a journal of his present. As the story progresses, the narrator's identity becomes increasingly complex and elusive. The writing style changes with each book, and the story is highly nonlinear, with narrative threads from different times told in parallel and story events related out of order as the narrator remembers or confronts them. As with many of Wolfe's novels, the narrator and the circumstances under which the book is being written are essential to understanding the story.

== Setting ==
Most of the story takes place in a star system with two habitable planets, Blue and Green (named for their appearance as seen from space). The human inhabitants arrived in the system after several centuries on an O'Neill-style generation starship called the Whorl, which is still in orbit, where some of the events take place. The "Short Sun" of the title is an ordinary star, and is named thus in contrast with the "Long Sun" the narrator grew up with, running along the axis of the Whorl.

- Blue, where most of the story is set, is an Earthlike world with vast oceans. Its previous inhabitants, an eight-limbed race variously called "The Neighbors" or the "Vanished People", abandoned the planet in the distant past, leaving only ruins, though they are still spotted on occasion. Widely separated cities have sprung up around the colonists' various landing points, including New Viron, Pajarocu, Gaon, Han, Blanko, and Dorp.
- Green is an inhospitable jungle world, hot and dark and frightening, but beautiful also, with "capes of moss and trickling waters". The native inhabitants are the inhumi. In their natural form, they are something like giant reptilian leeches, and like leeches they feed on blood, but they can alter the shape of their bodies well enough to fly or mimic human form. They are somehow able to travel between Green, Blue and the Whorl in order to hunt human beings.
- The Whorl is a dilapidated generation starship, run by uploaded rulers that have set themselves up as gods. At the time of The Book of the Short Sun, the remaining gods are attempting to drive the colonists out of the ship and down onto one of the two planets, by sending giant "godlings" to encourage them to leave. It is believed that turning off the Long Sun that runs down the middle of the Whorl is further to driving the colonists out, though this is explained in Return to the Whorl as being a method of mitigating the heat buildup caused by damaged cooling structures in the Whorl, and that Crew and Cargo were both attempting repairs on the Whorl including clearing out tunnels which allowed for cooling air to circulate through the Whorl and hopefully allow constant running of the Long Sun again.
- The Red Sun Whorl of The Book of the New Sun is also visited by several characters. The events of that series, it is made clear, commence just as the events of this one are ending.

== Plot summary ==
=== On Blue's Waters ===
As the book opens, the narrator, apparently Horn, is the Rajan of Gaon on Blue, acting as a sort of judge and mayor. He is attempting to set down how his adventure began: he was approached by the leaders of New Viron, who had received a letter from the "Men of PAJAROCU", a distant city, stating that they had a working lander and would be returning to the Whorl. Horn was asked to find them and go with them, in search of Caldé Silk, who (it was hoped) would bring order to the lawlessness and chaos of New Viron. In pursuit of this quest, he set off in a small boat toward the western continent he called Shadelow, joined, eventually, by Seawrack, Babbie, Sinew, and Krait. That narrative thread ends when he has reached Pajarocu and boarded the lander.

In alternating chapters, more or less, the Rajan of Gaon describes his current situation: the war his city is fighting against Han, a nearby city, his de facto imprisonment in Gaon, and his extensive dealings with inhumi and a critical secret he learned about them. He eventually escapes from Gaon with the help of one of his concubines, Evensong, and ends the first book in the wilderness.

=== In Green's Jungles ===
The book opens as the narrator is approaching the city of Blanko, where he is taken in by Inclito and his family. Small mysteries are related and solved in stories shared by the members of the household, and the narrator (now called Incanto, to conceal his identity) elliptically relates his tragic adventures on Green after the Pajarocu lander was diverted there. It is during these stories that he first discovers a strange thing: the inhumi, when he is near, can send spirits to distant places in (near) physical form, just as the Vanished People apparently can. In this way, Incanto and his companions explore Green and the original Red Sun Whorl.

Blanko, too, is swept up in war, and Incanto again aids them in their fight, discovering that his son Hide, who does not recognize him, is fighting alongside them while searching the world for his missing father. When the book ends, he, Hide, and his new "daughter" Jahlee (an inhuma) have left Blanko, and are on the road back to New Viron; the ending of the parallel story on Green is left uncertain.

=== Return to the Whorl ===
Return to the Whorl alternates between the narrator's first-person adventures on his way home and a third-person account of his travels on the Whorl, which he visited after Green. This third-person story is ostensibly penned by Hide, Hoof, Daisy, and Vadsig. Near the end, there is a section written by Hoof alone, and the very last pages are written by Daisy.

On the Whorl, the Long Sun has been blown out temporarily, and the world is in near-total darkness. The narrator encounters Pig and Hound, and with them travels to the ruins of Blood's mansion (where Mucor appears to them), and then to Old Viron. In the Caldé's Palace, he finds Maytera Marble's half-finished daughter Olivine, who donates one of her eyes for her mother; the narrator will eventually echo this gift by donating one of his own to Pig at the West Pole. The leadership of Old Viron, threatened by his reappearance, arranges with Hari Mau of Gaon to have him returned to Blue — at which point the narrative connects with the opening of On Blue's Waters.

For much of the first-person account, the narrator is imprisoned on Blue in a town called Dorp on trumped-up charges, and must use his various powers to foment a revolution against the unjust judges who rule the town. In the course of this effort, he again visits the Red Sun Whorl, where he meets a young Severian and inspires him to write a book. Once free, he returns to Lizard and New Viron, where the final riddle of his identity is solved, and helps defend against a massive attack of inhumi during Hide's wedding. When the book ends, he and his companions (Nettle, Seawrack, Oreb, and Marble) have apparently returned finally to the Whorl, which then departs for the stars.

== Characters ==
- The narrator, who names himself Horn, although he has other names at other times. He is charged by the leadership of his home town of New Viron to find Caldé Silk and return with him.
- Nettle, Horn's wife, who with him ostensibly wrote The Book of the Long Sun, the story of Silk. They have settled on the island of Lizard, where they have a paper-making business.
- Hoof and Hide, their twin sons, who are, with their future wives, the ostensible compilers and editors of The Book of the Short Sun.
- Sinew, their eldest son, who has a jealous and adversarial relationship with his father.
- Maytera Marble, a "chem" (sentient robot) from The Book of the Long Sun. She has gone blind, and asks Horn to find her an eye when he returns to the Whorl.
- Mucor, also from The Book of the Long Sun, who lives with Maytera Marble on a small island and has the reputation of being a witch. She has the ability to project her consciousness across, apparently, any distance.
- Krait, an inhumu who journeys with Horn for a time in the first book.
- Seawrack, a mysterious and beautiful one-armed woman who was raised beneath the sea. She also travels with Horn.
- Oreb, Silk's pet bird, a night chough, who was also a character in The Book of the Long Sun. Oreb can speak, but only in utterances of two syllables: "Good Silk! Fish heads!"
- Babbie, Mucor's pet hus, whom she sends to travel with Horn. Hus are native to Blue; they are something like intelligent eight-legged boars, with sharp, curving tusks.
- Pig, a blind man of giant stature who is walking to the West Pole of the Whorl to have his sight restored. He speaks with a thick accent: "Out with it" becomes "H'out wi' h'it." His true name is unknown.
- Hound, a shopkeeper who lives on the Whorl and travels with Pig and the narrator for a time. He lives in Endroad with his wife, Tansy, where they sell lanterns, nails, tack, and so on.
- Hari Mau, a leader in Gaon, where On Blue's Waters opens.
- Jahlee, an inhuma the narrator strikes a deal with in Gaon. Later, he passes her off as his daughter.
- Inclito, an important man in Blanko, with whom the narrator stays for most of In Green's Jungles. He lives with his mother, Salica, his daughter Mora, and Mora's friend Fava.
- Beroep, Aanvagen, and Vadsig of Dorp, in whose household the narrator is imprisoned for much of Return to the Whorl.
- Wijzer, a captain from Dorp who initially points Horn in the direction of Pajarocu.
- Caldé Bison and Mint, characters from The Book of the Long Sun who, in Silk's absence, are the leadership of Old Viron on the Whorl.
- Patera Remora, from The Book of the Long Sun, the Prolocutor of New Viron.
- Daisy, Hoof's eventual wife, who writes the last pages of the story.
