= The Wizard Knight =

Novel series by Gene Wolfe

- First combined edition
- The Knight; The Wizard
- Author: Gene Wolfe
- Country: United States
- Language: English
- Genre: Fantasy
- Publisher: Tor Books; Gollancz (omnibus)
- Published: 2004

The Wizard Knight is a series of epistolary novels written by fantasy and science fiction author Gene Wolfe. It chronicles the journey of Able of the High Heart, an American boy transported to a magical world and supernaturally aged to adulthood. Able (which is not his real name, but rather the name given to him) becomes a knight, and because of his connection with the magical and spiritual elements of the world around him is soon also dubbed a wizard.

Like many of Wolfe's writings, The Wizard Knight is characterized by a first person narrator – in this case, someone who tells events in fragmentary ways, out of order, and with omissions and connections that must be puzzled out later – though he is not an unreliable narrator.

The two volumes in the series are:

- The Knight
- The Wizard

== Cosmology ==
The setting of the novel features elements from Norse, as well as Christian theology and a smattering of European sources, such as Arthurian myth, and involves a seven-tiered world that is separate, but not completely detached, from ours.

The kingdom that Able is taken to is called Celidon, and lies in the middle world, Mythgarthr. The world above it, Skai, is the domain of the Overcyns, who are roughly analogous to the Æsir of Norse mythology, and to whom the inhabitants of Mythgarthr properly owe fealty. Terrible giants called "The Giants of Winter and Old Night", also dwell there, and are their foes. Above Skai is Kleos, which, being far from Mythgarthr, is not much explained. Two of its inhabitants are introduced: Parka, a being much like one of the Norns, and Michael, who is much like the archangel Michael. The Overcyns of Skai owe their obedience to those who dwell in Kleos. The highest world is Elysion, and only The Most High God lives there.

Below Mythgarthr is the world Aelfrice, which is primarily peopled by small elemental beings called the Aelf. They belong to a number of clans such as the Fire Aelf and the Moss Aelf, and were themselves created by the collective creature Kulili, who lives in Aelfrice still. The Aelf properly owe their worship to the people of Mythgarthr, who they call the "old gods", but often stray in their faithfulness, sometimes even tricking humans into worshiping them. Below Aelfrice is Muspel, a world of fire and dragons. Last and lowest is Niflheim, the world of The Most Low God.

Time flows more rapidly the higher one ascends in the worlds; Able spends short times in Aelfrice and Muspel and returns to Mythgarthr to discover weeks or months have passed; similarly, he spends decades in Skai and returns to find only a week has passed. It is implied that time stops completely in Niflheim and is infinitely fast in Elysion.

== Characters ==
- The narrator, who calls himself Sir Able of the High Heart. From the beginning, Sir Able wants two things: to be a knight and to win the love of Disiri the Mossmaiden. He says that he is an American and his book is written for his brother Ben.
- Gylf, a magical dog-like creature which is capable of transforming into a terrifying creature larger than a horse. Gylf speaks occasionally, but rarely, in front of anyone other than Sir Able; he is a hound that once belonged to the Valfather and has fallen from Skai.
- Toug, a boy that Sir Able meets with early in his travels who later becomes his squire, then a knight in his own right. Toug has a sister Ulfa who is a villager in the first book, but leaves her village to search for Sir Able in the second book.
- Garsecg, a character for whom there is a great deal of conflicting information. Garsecg first appears to be a powerful Aelf leader, but he is eventually revealed to be a half human half dragon being named Setr as well. Garsecg awakens Sir Able's knowledge of "the power of the sea", which heals him from a grievous wound and sometimes gives him super human strength and physical abilities. He is simultaneously Sir Able's friend and enemy, and a tyrant and protector of Aelfrice.
- Sir Ravd, the first knight who Sir Able meets. Sir Able admires Sir Ravd and adopts Sir Ravd's belief that honor, not money, or armor, or accolades makes a knight a knight. "It is honor, Able. A knight is a man who lives honorably and dies honorably, because he cares more for his honor than for his life."
- Disiri, the Queen of the Moss Aelf. She calls herself the moss maiden. She has the power to change people and she uses this power early in the story to transform Sir Able from a boy to an enormously strong man.
- Pouk, a one-eyed seaman who becomes Sir Able's servant.
- Uri and Baki, two fire aelf whom Sir Able appears to rescue from their slavery to Garsecg/Setr. They claim to be Sir Able's slaves, and frequently help him and attempt to seduce him.
- Mani, a talking cat. The former familiar of a witch. Mani is very selective in who he will talk around.
- Svon, the squire of Sir Ravd. He takes an instant dislike to Sir Able.
- Org, an ogre who becomes a servant of Sir Able.

== Synopsis ==
Throughout The Wizard Knight, Sir Able meets with strange and powerful creatures who give him various gifts. Disiri gives him the gift of sudden manhood and great strength. Some of the Earth Aelf (Bodachan) give him the magical dog Gylf. Garsecg gives him the power to call upon the ocean's waves to increase his strength and stamina. Two Fire Aelf, Baki and Uri, serve Sir Able after swearing allegiance to him.

Able's character is that of a young American boy from the modern era who is captured by Aelf, who bring him to the land of Aelfrice and eventually release him in Mythgarthr. His memories of that time in Aelfrice are non-existent, though, apparently removed by the Aelf. In Mythgarthr he falls in love with Disiri, the Queen of the Moss Aelf, and would do anything to be with her and for her to love him.

The first book finds Sir Able on a quest to find the sword Eterne, which Disiri says would be used by a knight worthy of her. Sir Able meets with Sir Ravd, who teaches him something of what it means to be a knight, then is killed by bandits. Sir Able takes a sea voyage to meet with Sir Ravd's lord but the ship is waylaid by cannibal barbarians called Osterlings and Sir Able is wounded. Sea Aelf take Able to Aelfrice to meet with Garsecg who teaches him about the ocean and shows him how to heal himself.

Sir Able returns to Mythgarthr but has difficulty in convincing the knights of Duke Marder that he is also a knight. After a brawl in which Sir Able is nearly killed, he accepts a knightly quest to hold a pass against all comers till the snow closes it. On his way to the pass he joins company with a talking cat named Mani and then a diplomatic expedition led by Baron Beel who is taking presents to Gilling, king of the Angrborn, the giants of Mythgarthr, in an attempt to bring an end to the constant warfare between the giants and the human kingdom of Celidon.

Sir Able enters the world of Aelfrice again and finds the sword Eterne, which he is able to wield. With the sword he slays the dragon Grengarm, dying in the process (although this is not made clear until well into the second book). He is brought by Alvit, a Valkyrie to the Valfather's castle in Skai, the realm above Mythgarthr (a clear parallel to the Norse idea of Valhalla). This is the end of the first book.

The second book, The Wizard, begins with Toug helping Baron Beel's diplomatic expedition in the capital city of the giants. Soon Sir Able reappears, riding a young unicorn that can fly (though it has no wings) and wielding Eterne. Sir Able has been 20 years with the Valfather fighting the giants but has now returned to Mythgarthr. Only a week or so has passed in the world of the other human characters. Sir Able now has the powers of a being of Skai but he cannot use his those powers because he promised the Valfather that he would not.

The diplomatic expedition to Jotunland, the land of giants, ends badly as the king of giants is mortally wounded during a staged combat. Baron Beel's daughter, Idnn, marries the king of the giants shortly before he dies, and then claims rule over the giantesses of Jotunland. With Sir Able's help, Baron Beel's expedition retreats back to the realm of men, defeating a host of giants along the way.

Another war is going on, fought between king Arnthor's army and the army of the cannibal Osterlings. Sir Able fights and wins a great combat with the undead champion of the king's sister Morcaine, and then is granted an audience with the king. He delivers a speech which angers the king, and is imprisoned for more than a year. He leaves Mythgarthr and travels with Lord Escan to Aelfrice and the worlds under it.

With the fall of Kingsdoom, the capital city of Celidon, and the Osterlings nearly victorious Sir Able returns with Lord Escan to Mythgarthr and his force meets up with the king's army at Burning Mountain. Able convinces the king to give up the mountain to retreat and gather his forces. After they gather more forces, a final battle is waged against the Osterlings. Sir Able commands the Aelf to come to their aid, and as he is a being of Mythgarthr and a god to the Aelf, they comply. The battle is won, and he leaves Mythgarthr to live with Disiri in the land of the Moss Aelf. The book then goes on to state in the last few pages that Michael (from Kleos) has a request from his master for Sir Able to be his champion, and also that Michael has found a way to transport the book (written as a letter to Ben (Sir Able's brother)) back to America so that Ben can read it. This is the end of the second book.

== Publication information ==
Name	Published	ISBN	Notes
The Knight	Tor, 2004	ISBN 0-7653-0989-0	Volume 1; Nebula Award nominee, 2004
The Wizard	Tor, 2004	ISBN 0-7653-1201-8	Volume 2;
The Wizard Knight	Gollancz, 2005		Both stories in one volume; Locus Award nominee, 2005; World Fantasy Award nominee, 2005
