= Plant Engineering =

- Type: business magazine
- Owner: CFE Media
- Editor: Bob Vavra
- Founded: 1947
- Language: English
- Headquarters: Downers Grove, Illinois, USA
- ISSN: 0032-082X
- Website: www.plantengineering.com

Plant Engineering (ISSN 0032-082X) is a trade publication and web site owned by CFE Media. It covers the field of plant engineering and maintenance in both manufacturing and non-manufacturing industries.

In April 2010, former owner Reed Business Information announced the magazine would close. However later that month, Control Engineering, Consulting-Specifying Engineer and Plant Engineering were acquired by a new company, CFE Media.
