= Gene Wolfe =

American science fiction and fantasy writer (1931–2019)

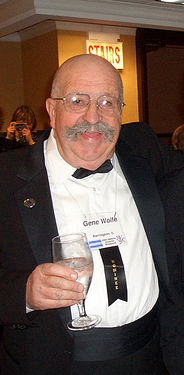
- Wolfe at the 2005 Nebula Awards
- Born: Gene Rodman Wolfe; May 7, 1931; New York City, U.S.
- Died: April 14, 2019 (aged 87); Peoria, Illinois, U.S.
- Education: Texas A&M University; University of Houston
- Occupations: Novelist, short story writer
- Spouse: Rosemary Wolfe (m. 1952; died 2013)
- Writing career
- Period: c. 1966 – 2019
- Genres: Fantasy; science fiction
- Notable works: The Book of the New Sun; Solar Cycle; Soldier of Sidon
- Notable awards: See subsection

Gene Rodman Wolfe (May 7, 1931 – April 14, 2019) was an American science fiction and fantasy writer. He was noted for his dense, allusive prose, his fascination with memory and the strong influence of his Catholic faith. He was a prolific short story writer and novelist who won many literary awards. He was honored as a Grand Master by the Science Fiction and Fantasy Writers of America.

Wolfe is best known for his Book of the New Sun series (four volumes, 1980–1983), the first part of his "Solar Cycle". In 1998, Locus magazine ranked it the third-best fantasy novel published before 1990 based on a poll of subscribers that considered it and several other series as single entries. (Note: Locus subscribers voted J. R. R. Tolkien's The Lord of the Rings and The Hobbit ahead of Wolfe's New Sun, followed by Ursula K. Le Guin's Earthsea series. Third and fourth ranks were exchanged in the 1987 rendition of the poll, "All-Time Best Fantasy Novels", which considered as single entries Wolfe's The Shadow of the Torturer and Le Guin's A Wizard of Earthsea, the first volumes of New Sun and Earthsea.) Ursula K. Le Guin called Wolfe "our Melville".

== Personal life ==
Wolfe was born in New York City, the son of Mary Olivia (née Ayers) and Emerson Leroy Wolfe. He had polio as a small child. He and his family moved to Houston when he was 6, and he went to high school and college in Texas, attending Lamar High School. While attending Texas A&M University, he published his first speculative fiction in The Commentator, a student literary journal. (Note: The Internet Speculative Fiction Database catalogs two 1951 stories.) Early in his writing career, Wolfe exchanged correspondence with J. R. R. Tolkien.

Wolfe dropped out during his junior year and subsequently was drafted to fight in the Korean War. After returning to the United States, he earned a degree from the University of Houston and became an industrial engineer. He was a senior editor on the staff of the journal Plant Engineering for many years before retiring to write full-time, but his most famous professional engineering achievement is a contribution to the machine used to make Pringles potato chips.

Wolfe lived in Barrington, Illinois, a suburb of Chicago, with his wife Rosemary where they raised four children. Wolfe also has three granddaughters. The Wolfes moved to Peoria, Illinois in 2013. Wolfe underwent double bypass surgery on April 24, 2010.

Wolfe also underwent cataract surgery on his right eye in early 2013. Wolfe's wife, Rosemary, died on December 14, 2013, after a series of illnesses including Alzheimer's disease. Wolfe said, "There was a time when she did not remember my name or that we were married, but she still remembered that she loved me."

Wolfe died at his Peoria home from cardiovascular disease on April 14, 2019, at the age of 87.

== Literary works ==
Wolfe's first published book was the paperback original novel Operation Ares (Berkley Medallion, 1970). He first received critical attention for The Fifth Head of Cerberus (Scribner's, 1972) that examined a "colonial mentality within an orthodox science fiction framework". It was published in German and French-language editions within the decade.

“The Island of Doctor Death and Other Stories” was mistakenly named the winner of Best Novella at the Nebula Awards. Isaac Asimov jokingly told Wolfe to write a story called The Death of Doctor Island in the hopes that it would win. Wolfe did, and it did. Along with “The Doctor of Death Island”, they were published in The Island of Doctor Death and Other Stories and Other Stories. Along with the previously unpublished “Death of the Island Doctor”, they were collected in The Wolfe Archipelago.

His best-known and most highly regarded work is the multi-volume novel The Book of the New Sun. Set in a bleak, distant future influenced by Jack Vance's Dying Earth series, the story details the life of Severian, a journeyman torturer, exiled from his guild for showing compassion to one of the condemned. The novel is composed of the volumes The Shadow of the Torturer (1980), The Claw of the Conciliator (1981; winner of the Nebula Award for Best Novel), The Sword of the Lictor (1982), and The Citadel of the Autarch (1983). A coda, The Urth of the New Sun (1987), ties up some loose ends but is generally considered a separate work. Several of Wolfe's essays about writing the Book of the New Sun series were published in The Castle of the Otter (1982; the title refers to a misprint of the fourth book's title in Locus magazine).

In 1984, Wolfe retired from his engineering position and was then able to devote more time to his writing. In the 1990s, Wolfe published two more works in the same universe as The Book of the New Sun. The first, The Book of the Long Sun, consists of the novels Nightside the Long Sun (1993), Lake of the Long Sun (1994), Caldé of the Long Sun (1994), and Exodus From the Long Sun (1996). These books follow the priest of a small parish as he becomes wrapped up in political intrigue and revolution in his city-state. Wolfe then wrote a sequel, The Book of the Short Sun, composed of On Blue's Waters (1999), In Green's Jungles (2000), and Return to the Whorl (2001), dealing with colonists who have arrived on the sister planets Blue and Green. The four Sun works (The Book of the New Sun, The Urth of the New Sun, The Book of the Long Sun, and The Book of the Short Sun) are often referred to collectively as the "Solar Cycle".

Wolfe also wrote many stand-alone books. His first novel, Operation Ares, was published by Berkley Books in 1970 and was unsuccessful. He subsequently wrote two novels held in particularly high esteem, Peace and The Fifth Head of Cerberus. The first is the seemingly-rambling narrative of Alden Dennis Weer, a man of many secrets who reviews his life under mysterious circumstances. The Fifth Head of Cerberus is either a collection of three novellas or a novel in three parts, dealing with colonialism, memory, and the nature of personal identity. The first story, which gives the book its name, was nominated for the Nebula Award for Best Novella.

== Style ==
Wolfe's writing frequently relies on the first-person perspectives of unreliable narrators. He said: "Real people really are unreliable narrators all the time, even if they try to be reliable narrators." The causes for the unreliability of his characters vary. Some are naive, as in Pandora by Holly Hollander or The Knight; others are not particularly intelligent (There Are Doors); Severian, from The Book of the New Sun, tells his story from the perspective of his younger, ignorant self; and Latro of the Soldier series suffers from amnesia.

Wolfe wrote in a letter, "My definition of a great story has nothing to do with 'a varied and interesting background.' It is: One that can be read with pleasure by a cultivated reader and reread with increasing pleasure." In that spirit, Wolfe also left subtle hints and lacunae that may never be explicitly referred to in the text. For example, a backyard full of morning glories is an intentional foreshadowing of events in Free Live Free, but it is apparent only to a reader with a horticultural background, and a story-within-the-story provides a clue to understanding Peace.

Wolfe's language can also be a subject of confusion for the new reader. In the appendix to The Shadow of the Torturer, he says:

In rendering this book—originally composed in a tongue that has not achieved existence—into English, I might easily have saved myself a great deal of labor by having recourse to invented terms; in no case have I done so. Thus in many instances I have been forced to replace yet undiscovered concepts by their closest twentieth-century equivalents. Such words as peltast, androgyn, and exultant are substitutions of this kind, and are intended to be suggestive rather than definitive.

This character of the fictional "translator" of his novel provides a certain insight into Wolfe's writing: all of his terms—fuligin, carnifex, thaumaturge, and so on—are real words.

== Reception ==
Although he was not a best-selling author, Wolfe is highly regarded by critics (Note: Such as John Clute, who writes: "Though neither the most popular nor the most influential author in the sf field, Gene Wolfe is today quite possibly the most important. The inherent stature of his work is deeply impressive and he wears the fictional worlds of sf like a coat of many colors.") and fellow writers. He was often considered to be not only one of the greatest science fiction authors, but one of the best American writers regardless of genre. In 2003, award-winning science fiction author Michael Swanwick said: "Gene Wolfe is the greatest writer in the English language alive today. Let me repeat that: Gene Wolfe is the greatest writer in the English language alive today! I mean it. Shakespeare was a better stylist, Melville was more important to American letters, and Charles Dickens had a defter hand at creating characters. But among living writers, there is nobody who can even approach Gene Wolfe for brilliance of prose, clarity of thought, and depth in meaning."

Patrick O'Leary has credited Wolfe for inspiration. He has said: "Forget 'Speculative Fiction.' Gene Wolfe is the best writer alive. Period. And as Wolfe once said, 'All novels are fantasies. Some are more honest about it.' No comparison. Nobody – I mean nobody – comes close to what this artist does." O'Leary also wrote an extensive essay concerning the nature of Wolfe's artistry, entitled "If Ever A Wiz There Was", originally published in his collection Other Voices, Other Doors. Ursula K. Le Guin is frequently quoted on the jackets of Wolfe's books as having said "Wolfe is our Melville."

Harlan Ellison, reviewing The Shadow of the Torturer, wrote: "Gene Wolfe is engaged in the holy chore of writing every other author under the table. He is no less than one of the finest, most original writers in the world today. His work is singular, hypnotizing, startlingly above comparison. The Shadow of the Torturer breaks new ground in American literature and, as the first novel of a tetralogy, casts a fierce light on what will certainly be a lodestone landmark, his most stunning work to date. It is often said, but never more surely than this time: This book is not to be missed at peril of one's intellectual enrichment."

Wolfe's fans regard him with considerable dedication, and one Internet mailing list (URTH, begun in November 1996) dedicated to his works amassed over ten years and thousands of pages of discussion and explication. Similarly, much analysis and exegesis has been published in fanzine and small-press form (e.g. Lexicon Urthus ISBN 0-9642795-9-2).

When asked the "Most overrated" and "Most underrated" authors, Thomas M. Disch identified Isaac Asimov and Gene Wolfe, respectively, writing: "...all too many have already gone into a decline after carrying home some trophies. The one exception is Gene Wolfe... Between 1980 and 1982 he published The Book of the New Sun, a tetralogy of couth, intelligence, and suavity that is also written in VistaVision with Dolby Sound. Imagine a Star Wars–style space opera penned by G. K. Chesterton in the throes of a religious conversion. Wolfe has continued in full diapason ever since, and a crossover success is long overdue."

Michael Dirda included Wolfe's Book of the New Sun in his "Science Fiction Reading List", writing: "If Proust, while listening to late Beethoven string quartets, wrote I, Claudius and set it in the future, the result might resemble this measured, autumnal masterpiece."

Neil Gaiman introduced Wolfe at the World Horror Convention, where Wolfe was the Guest of Honor. He offered some advice on how to read Wolfe, noting: "There are two kinds of clever writer. The ones that point out how clever they are, and the ones who see no need to point out how clever they are. Gene Wolfe is of the second kind, and the intelligence is less important than the tale. He is not smart to make you feel stupid. He is smart to make you smart as well." Gaiman wrote about Wolfe for the "My Hero" feature in The Guardian:

I've met too many of my heroes, and these days I avoid meeting the few I have left, because the easiest way to stop having heroes is to meet them, or worse, have dinner with them. But Gene Wolfe remains a hero to me. He's just turned 80, looks after his wife Rosemary, and is still writing deep, complex, brilliant fiction that slips between genres. He's my hero because he keeps trying new ways of writing and because he remains as kind and as patient with me as he was when I was almost a boy. He's the finest living male American writer of SF and fantasy – possibly the finest living American writer. Most people haven't heard of him. And that doesn't bother Gene in the slightest. He just gets on with writing the next book.

=== Awards ===
Wolfe won the World Fantasy Award for Life Achievement in 1996, a judged award at the annual World Fantasy Convention. He was inducted by the Science Fiction Hall of Fame in 2007. The Science Fiction and Fantasy Writers of America named him its 29th SFWA Grand Master in December 2012; the annual Damon Knight Memorial Grand Master Award was presented to Wolfe during Nebula Awards weekend, May 16–19, 2013.

He was Guest of Honor at the 1985 World Science Fiction Convention and he received the 1989 Edward E. Smith Memorial Award (or "Skylark") at the New England convention Boskone. In March 2012 he was presented with the first Chicago Literary Hall of Fame Fuller Award, for outstanding contribution to literature by a Chicago author. After his death, Wolfe was inducted into the Chicago Literary Hall of Fame in a ceremony on September 21, 2021. Wolfe was the first Fuller Award recipient to be inducted; and though he was part of the 2019 class, the ceremony to honor him did not occur until 2021.

He also won many awards for individual works:

Work	Form	Award
The Computer Iterates the Greater Trumps	Long Poem	1978 Rhysling Award
The Shadow of the Torturer	Novel	1981 BSFA Award
The Shadow of the Torturer	Novel	1981 World Fantasy Award
The Claw of the Conciliator	Novel	1981 Nebula Award
The Claw of the Conciliator	Novel	1982 Locus Award
The Sword of the Lictor	Novel	1983 Locus Award
The Sword of the Lictor	Novel	1983 August Derleth Award
The Citadel of the Autarch	Novel	1984 Campbell Award
Soldier of the Mist	Novel	1987 Locus Award
Storeys from the Old Hotel	Collection	1989 World Fantasy Award
Golden City Far	Novella	2005 Locus Award
Soldier of Sidon	Novel	2007 World Fantasy Award
The Best of Gene Wolfe	Collection	2010 Locus Award
The Best of Gene Wolfe	Collection	2010 World Fantasy Award

Wolfe also amassed a long list of nominations in years when he did not win, including sixteen Nebula award nominations and eight Hugo Award nominations.

== Works ==
This is a partial list of works by Wolfe, focusing on those which won awards.

=== Novels ===
- The Book of the New Sun
  - The Shadow of the Torturer (1980) BSFA Award & World Fantasy Award winner, 1981; Nebula Award and John W. Campbell Award nominee, 1981
  - The Claw of the Conciliator (1981) Nebula and Locus Fantasy winner, 1982; Hugo and World Fantasy Awards nominated, 1982
  - The Sword of the Lictor (1982) Locus Fantasy and BFS Winner, 1983; Nebula and BSFA Awards nominee, 1982 Hugo and World Fantasy Awards nominee, 1983
  - The Citadel of the Autarch (1983) John W. Campbell award winner, Nebula and BSFA nominee, 1984; Locus Fantasy nominee, 1983
- Free Live Free (1984) BSFA nominee, 1985; Nebula nominee, 1986
- The Urth of the New Sun (1987) Hugo, Nebula, and Locus SF Awards nominee, 1988
- The Soldier series
  - Soldier of the Mist (1986) Locus Fantasy winner, WFA nominee, 1987; Nebula nominee 1988
  - Soldier of Arete (1989) Locus Fantasy and WFA nominee, 1990
  - Soldier of Sidon (2006) World Fantasy Award winner, Locus Fantasy Award nominee, 2007
- There Are Doors (1988) Locus Fantasy nominee, 1989
- The Book of the Long Sun
  - Nightside the Long Sun (1993) Nebula nominee, 1994
  - Lake of the Long Sun (1994)
  - Caldé of the Long Sun (1994) Nebula nominee, 1996
  - Exodus From the Long Sun (1996)
- The Book of the Short Sun
  - On Blue's Waters (1999)
  - In Green's Jungles (2000) Locus SF nominee, 2001
  - Return to the Whorl (2001) Locus SF nominee, 2002
- The Wizard Knight
  - The Knight (2004) Nebula nominee, 2005
  - The Wizard (2004) Locus Fantasy and World Fantasy Award nominated, 2005
- Pirate Freedom (2007) Locus Fantasy Award nominee, 2008
- An Evil Guest (2008)
- The Sorcerer's House (2010) Locus Fantasy nominee, 2011
- Home Fires (2011)
- The Land Across (2013)
- A Borrowed Man (2015)
- Interlibrary Loan (2020)

=== Story collections ===
- The Island of Doctor Death and Other Stories and Other Stories (1980) (The title story is "The Island of Doctor Death and Other Stories". Among others, the collection also includes "The Death of Dr. Island" and "The Doctor of Death Island". "The Death of Dr. Island" won the Nebula Award for Best Novella.)
- Gene Wolfe's Book of Days (1981)
- Storeys from the Old Hotel (1988) (winner of the World Fantasy Award for best collection)
- Endangered Species (1989)
- Castle of Days (1995)
- Strange Travelers (2001)
- Innocents Aboard (2005)
- Starwater Strains (2006)
- The Best of Gene Wolfe (2010)
- The Dead Man and Other Horror Stories (2023)

== Books about Gene Wolfe ==
- Gene Wolfe (Starmont Reader's Guide, 29): Joan Gordon (Borgo Press, 1986, ISBN 978-0930261191; reprinted as a Special Publication of the Monterey Bay Aquarium Foundation, 2008, ISBN 978-0930261184), an annotated bibliography and criticism on Wolfe's science fiction and non-fiction writing
- The Wizard Knight Companion: A Lexicon for Gene Wolfe's The Knight and The Wizard: Michael Andre-Driussi (Sirius Fiction, 2009, ISBN 978-0-9642795-3-7), a dictionary of words and names from Wolfe's Wizard Knight novels
- Lexicon Urthus: Michael Andre-Druissi (Sirius Fiction, 1994, ISBN 0-9642795-9-2), a dictionary of the archaic words used by Wolfe in The Book of the New Sun
- The Long and the Short of It: More Essays on the Fiction of Gene Wolfe: Robert Borski (iUniverse, Inc., 2006, ISBN 978-0-595-38645-1)
- Solar Labyrinth: Exploring Gene Wolfe's "Book of the New Sun": Robert Borski (iUniverse, Inc., 2004, ISBN 978-0-595-31729-5)
- Attending Daedalus: Gene Wolfe, Artifice, and the Reader: Peter Wright (Liverpool University Press, 2003, ISBN 0-85323-818-9): Study of The Book of the New Sun and The Urth of the New Sun
- Shadows of the New Sun: Wolfe on Writing / Writers on Wolfe: Peter Wright (Liverpool University Press, 2007, ISBN 978-1-84631-058-4)
- Strokes: John Clute (Serconia Press, 1988, ISBN 0-934933-03-0)
- Gene Wolfe: An annotated bibliography and criticism on Wolfe's science fiction and non-fiction writing: Joan Gordon (Borgo Press, 2008, ISBN 0-930261-18-6)
- Gate of Horn, Book of Silk: A Guide to Gene Wolfe's The Book of the Long Sun and The Book of the Short Sun: Michael Andre-Driussi (Sirius Fiction, 2012, ISBN 0-964279-55-X)
- Shadows of the New Sun, an anthology of stories by other authors which are all explicitly based on Wolfe stories (TOR Books, 2013)
- Between Light and Shadow: An Exploration of the Fiction of Gene Wolfe, 1951-1986: Marc Aramini (Castalia House, 2015, ASIN B011YTDGY2), a comprehensive literary analysis of Wolfe's fiction from 1951 to 1986, volume 1 of 2.

== Film adaptations ==
- The Death of Doctor Island, 35 mm short, 2008.
