= 1982 in literature =

This article contains information about the literary events and publications of 1982.

== Events ==
- February 17 – Philip K. Dick ignores advice to go immediately to hospital. A fortnight later, after two strokes, he is pronounced brain-dead and disconnected from his life-support machine.
- March 18 – A legal case brought on behalf of Mary Whitehouse against theater director Michael Bogdanov is dropped after the Attorney General intervenes. The case concerned alleged indecency in a performance of Howard Brenton's play The Romans in Britain at the National Theatre in London.
- June 25 – In Island Trees School District v. Pico (457 U.S. 853 (1982)), the Supreme Court of the United States concludes that "local school boards may not remove books from school library shelves simply because they dislike the ideas contained in those books and seek by their removal to 'prescribe what shall be orthodox in politics, nationalism, religion, or other matters of opinion."
- September – Banned Books Week is instituted in the United States.
- October 7 – After Sue Townsend's comic character Adrian Mole is introduced (as Nigel Mole, aged 13¼, living in the East Midlands of England) in a BBC Radio 4 play, the book The Secret Diary of Adrian Mole, Aged 13¾, is released; it sells 1.9 million copies in three years.
- unknown dates
  - La Bicyclette bleue (The Blue Bicycle) by Régine Deforges is a runaway success and becomes one of France's all-time bestselling novels.
  - The Oxford Shakespeare, under the general editorship of Stanley Wells, begins publication.
  - Dorling Kindersley, formerly a book packager, begins publishing.

== New books ==
=== Fiction ===
- Brian Aldiss – Helliconia Spring (first of the Helliconia trilogy)
- Isabel Allende – The House of the Spirits (La casa de los espíritus)
- Isaac Asimov – Foundation's Edge
- Jean M. Auel – The Valley of Horses
- René Barjavel – La Tempête
- Julian Barnes – Before She Met Me
- Saul Bellow - The Dean's December
- Michael Bishop – Blooded on Arachne
- William Boyd – An Ice-Cream War
- José Cardoso Pires – Balada da Praia dos Cães
- Arthur C. Clarke – 2010: Odyssey Two
- Bernard Cornwell – Sharpe's Company
- L. Sprague de Camp – The Virgin of Zesh & The Tower of Zanid
- L. Sprague de Camp and Lin Carter – Conan the Barbarian
- August Derleth – The Solar Pons Omnibus
- Marguerite Duras – The Malady of Death
- Zee Edgell – Beka Lamb
- Stanley Elkin – George Mills
- Buchi Emecheta – Destination Biafra
- Penelope Fitzgerald – At Freddie's
- Ken Follett – The Man from St. Petersburg
- John Fowles – Mantissa
- Max Frisch – Bluebeard
- John Gardner – For Special Services (James Bond novel)
- Graham Greene – Monsignor Quixote
- Robert A. Heinlein – Friday
- L. Ron Hubbard – Battlefield Earth
- Hammond Innes – The Black Tide
- Kazuo Ishiguro – A Pale View of Hills
- John Jakes – North and South
- Thomas Keneally – Schindler's Ark
- David Kesterton – The Darkling
- Stephen King
  - Different Seasons
  - The Running Man
- W. P. Kinsella – Shoeless Joe
- Judith Krantz – Mistral's Daughter
- Peter Kreeft – Between Heaven and Hell: A Dialog Somewhere Beyond Death with John F. Kennedy, C. S. Lewis, & Aldous Huxley
- Derek Lambert – The Red Dove
- Robert Ludlum – The Parsifal Mosaic
- Colleen McCullough – An Indecent Obsession
- Russell McCormmach – Night Thoughts of a Classical Physicist
- Ngaio Marsh (died February 18) – Light Thickens
- George R. R. Martin – Fevre Dream
- James Merrill – The Changing Light at Sandover
- James A. Michener – Space
- Timothy Mo – Sour Sweet
- Harry Mulisch – The Assault
- Chris Mullin – A Very British Coup
- Gerald Murnane – The Plains
- Ellis Peters – The Virgin in the Ice
- Barbara Pym (died 1980) – An Unsuitable Attachment (written 1963)
- Sidney Sheldon – Master of the Game
- Anne Tyler – Dinner at the Homesick Restaurant
- Kurt Vonnegut – Deadeye Dick
- John Wain – Young Shoulders
- Alice Walker – The Color Purple
- Connie Willis and Cynthia Felice – Water Witch
- Gene Wolfe – The Citadel of the Autarch
- Roger Zelazny
  - Dilvish, the Damned
  - Eye of Cat

=== Children and young people ===
- Chris Van Allsburg – Ben's Dream
- Gillian Cross – The Demon Headmaster (first in an eponymous series of six)
- Roald Dahl – The BFG
- Steve Jackson and Ian Livingstone – The Warlock of Firetop Mountain
- Margaret Mahy – The Haunting
- Michael Morpurgo – War Horse
- Ruth Park – The Muddle-Headed Wombat Stays at Home
- Bill Peet – The Luckiest One of All
- Claude Roy (illustrated by Willi Glasauer) – The Cat who Talked in Spite of Himself (Le chat qui parlait malgré lui)
- Viveca Sundvall – En ettas dagbok
- Sue Townsend – The Secret Diary of Adrian Mole, Aged 13¾

=== Drama ===
- Caryl Churchill – Top Girls
- Andrea Dunbar – Rita, Sue and Bob Too
- Peter Flannery – Our Friends in the North
- Michael Frayn – Noises Off
- Athol Fugard – "Master Harold"...and the Boys
- Elfriede Jelinek – Clara S, musikalische Tragödie
- Maryat Lee and the people of Hinton, West Virginia – A Double-Threaded Life: The Hinton Play
- Doug Lucie – Hard Feelings
- Stephen MacDonald – Not About Heroes
- Frank McGuinness – The Factory Girls
- Peter O'Donnell – Mr. Fothergill's Murder
- Tom Stoppard – The Real Thing
- August Wilson – Ma Rainey's Black Bottom

=== Non-fiction ===
- Irving Abella and Harold Troper – None is Too Many
- Martin Amis – Invasion of the Space Invaders
- Luc Brisson – Plato the Myth Maker
- Beth Chatto – The Damp Garden
- Mark Ellingham (editor) – The Rough Guide to Greece
- Bruce Feirstein – Real Men Don't Eat Quiche
- Eduardo Galeano – Memoria del fuego (Memory of Fire), vol. 1
- Carol Gilligan – In a Different Voice
- Sita Ram Goel – How I Became a Hindu
- Rhys Isaac – The Transformation of Virginia, 1740–1790
- Ryszard Kapuściński – Shah of Shahs (Szachinszach)
- Gary Kinder – Victim: The Other Side of Murder
- Audre Lorde – Zami: A New Spelling of My Name
- Elaine Morgan – The Aquatic Ape
- John Naisbitt – Megatrends
- Fernando Pessoa (died 1935) – The Book of Disquiet (Livro do Desassossego: Composto por Bernardo Soares, ajudante de guarda-livros na cidade de Lisboa)
- Tom Peters – In Search of Excellence
- Erin Pizzey – Prone to Violence
- Richard Rodriguez – Hunger of Memory: The Education of Richard Rodriguez (autobiography)
- Richard Rorty – Consequences of Pragmatism
- Armando Scannone - Mi Cocina
- Jonathan Schell – The Fate of the Earth
- Margaret Trudeau – Consequences
- Rebecca West – 1900

== Births ==
- January 9 – Nora Bossong, German poet and writer
- January 14
  - Joe Dunthorne, Welsh novelist and poet
  - Luke Wright, English poet
- February 5 – Lauren Gunderson, American playwright
- February 23 – Kateryna Mikhalitsyna, Ukrainian poet, children's writer, translator and editor
- March 24 – Bryndís Björgvinsdóttir, Icelandic children's fiction writer
- April 21 – Claybourne Elder, American actor, singer and writer
- May 10 – Jeremy Gable, English-American playwright
- June 29
  - Colin Jost, American actor, screenwriter and comedian
  - Ott Sepp, Estonian actor, singer, writer and television presenter
- July 8 – James Graham, English playwright
- July 16 – Angel David Revilla, Venezuelan journalist and writer

== Deaths ==
- January 16 – Ramón J. Sender, Spanish novelist (b. 1901)
- February 5 – Ronald Welch (Ronald Oliver Felton) Welsh novelist and children's writer writing in English (born 1909)
- February 11 – Albert Facey, Australian autobiographer (born 1894)
- February 13 – Barbara Sleigh, English children's writer (born 1906)
- February 18 – Dame Ngaio Marsh, New Zealand crime writer and theatre director (born 1895)
- February 23 – Elisabeth Kyle, Scottish novelist (born 1901)
- March 2 – Philip K. Dick, American writer (stroke; born 1928)
- March 3 – Georges Perec, French novelist (lung cancer; born 1936)
- March 6 – Ayn Rand, Russian-born American novelist, playwright and screenwriter (born 1905)
- March 11
  - June Arnold, American novelist and publisher (born 1926)
  - Edmund Cooper, English writer and poet (born 1926)
- March 25
  - Goodman Ace, American humorist (born 1899)
  - Hugo Huppert, Austrian poet, writer and translator (born 1902)
- March 27
  - Harriet Adams, American novelist (born 1892)
  - Ted Lewis, English crime novelist (born 1940)
- April 12 – Norman Denny, English writer and translator (born 1901)
- May 10 – Peter Weiss, German writer and artist (born 1916)
- May 30 – Doris Leslie, English novelist (born 1891)
- June 6 – Kenneth Rexroth, American poet and critic (born 1905)
- June 18
  - Djuna Barnes, American writer (born 1892)
  - John Cheever, American novelist and short story writer (born 1912)
- June 30 – Malcolm Saville, English children's writer (born 1901)
- July 3 – Engvald Bakkan, Norwegian novelist and children's writer (born 1897)
- August 6 – S. K. Pottekkatt, Indian writer (born 1913)
- September 14 – John Gardner, American novelist (motorcycle accident, born 1933)
- October 7 – Alejandro Núñez Alonso, Spanish novelist (born 1905)
- October 22 – Savitri Devi, French-born writer and philosopher (born 1905)
- October 30 – Iryna Vilde, Ukrainian writer (born 1907)
- November 5 – Theresa Hak Kyung Cha, Korean-American novelist (murdered; born 1951)
- November 6 – Frank Swinnerton, English novelist (born 1884)
- December 5 – Caryl Brahms, English critic, novelist and journalist (born 1901)
- December 21 – Ants Oras, Estonian writer (born 1900)
- December 24 – Louis Aragon, French poet and writer (born 1897)

== Awards ==
- Nobel Prize in Literature: Gabriel García Márquez

=== Australia ===
- The Australian/Vogel Literary Award: Brian Castro, Birds of Passage; Nigel Krauth, Matilda, My Darling
- Kenneth Slessor Prize for Poetry: Fay Zwicky, Kaddish and Other Poems
- Miles Franklin Award: Rodney Hall, Just Relations

=== Canada ===
- See 1982 Governor General's Awards for a complete list of winners and finalists for those awards.

=== France ===
- Prix Goncourt: Dominique Fernandez, Dans la main de l'Ange
- Prix Médicis French: Jean-François Josselin, L'Enfer et Cie
- Prix Médicis International: Umberto Eco, The Name of the Rose

=== Spain ===
- Miguel de Cervantes Prize: Luis Rosales

=== United Kingdom ===
- Booker Prize: Thomas Keneally, Schindler's Ark
- Carnegie Medal for children's literature: Margaret Mahy, The Haunting
- Cholmondeley Award: Basil Bunting, Herbert Lomas, William Scammell
- Eric Gregory Award: Steve Ellis, Jeremy Reed, Alison Brackenbury, Neil Astley, Chris O'Neill, Joseph Bristow, John Gibbens, James Lasdun
- James Tait Black Memorial Prize for fiction: Bruce Chatwin, On the Black Hill
- James Tait Black Memorial Prize for biography: Richard Ellmann, James Joyce
- Whitbread Best Book Award: Bruce Chatwin, On the Black Hill

=== United States ===
- Agnes Lynch Starrett Poetry Prize: Lawrence Joseph, Shouting at No One
- American Academy of Arts and Letters Gold Medal for Fiction, Bernard Malamud
- Nebula Award for Best Novel: Michael Bishop, No Enemy But Time
- Newbery Medal for children's literature: Nancy Willard, A Visit to William Blake's Inn
- Pulitzer Prize for Drama: Charles Fuller, A Soldier's Play
- Pulitzer Prize for Fiction: John Updike, Rabbit Is Rich
- Pulitzer Prize for Poetry: Sylvia Plath: The Collected Poems
- Hugo Award:
  - Best Novella: Poul Anderson, The Saturn Game

=== Elsewhere ===
- Friedenspreis des Deutschen Buchhandels: George F. Kennan
- Hugo Award for Best Novel: Downbelow Station by C. J. Cherryh
- Premio Nadal: Fernando Arrabal, La torre herida por un rayo
