= Phagor =

Phagor may refer to:

- Phagor, a minor biblical place
- Phagors, fictional creatures in the Helliconia trilogy by Brian Aldiss
