= Attaway =

Attaway is a surname. Notable people with the surname include:

- Mary Attaway Lee (1923–1989), American playwright and theatre director
- Murray Attaway, American musician
- Ruth Attaway (1910–1987), American film and stage actress
- William Attaway (1911–1986), African-American novelist, short story writer, essayist, songwriter, playwright and screenwrite

See also

- Attaway v. Omega, was a decision by the Indiana Court of Appeal
