= Helliconia Spring =

1982 novel by Brian W. Aldiss

Helliconia Spring is a novel by Brian W. Aldiss published in 1982. It is the first part of the Helliconia trilogy, followed by Helliconia Summer (1983) and Helliconia Winter (1985).

== Plot summary ==
Helliconia Spring is a novel which is set on a planet with two suns, where each year is incredibly long.

== Characters ==
=== Humans ===
==== Prelude ====
- Alehaw: The father of Yuli. He teaches his son how to hunt, and is captured by phagors.
- Atrimb: A trader from Pannoval. He and his fellow trader Prast happen upon Yuli.
- Bervin: A priest of Pannoval. He occasionally accompanies Yuli during duties.
- Dravog: A guard lieutenant of Pannoval. He has charge over some prisoners working in a punishment farm.
- Ebron: A captain of the north guard of Pannoval. He is a member of the local militia who questions Yuli about how he came to reside in the city.
- Fitty: A young lady who sings. She becomes the wife of Scoraw.
- Hasele: A trader and trapper. He finds an exhausted and starving Yuli caught in one of his snares.
- Isik: A kind and intelligent woman. She becomes the wife of Usilk.
- Iskador: A skilled archer of Pannoval. She is the former girlfriend of Usilk, and later becomes the wife of Yuli.
- Kyale: A trader who runs a stall in the market of Pannoval. He offers protection and hospitality to Yuli.
- Lorel: The old wife of Hasele. She attempts to coddle and care for Yuli.
- Naab: A street-preacher of Pannoval. He advocates for reform within the city’s priesthood, and is ritualistically executed.
- Onesa: The mother of Yuli. She is rather sick, but has been able to lend some wisdom to her son.
- Prast: A trader from Pannoval. He and his fellow trader Atrimb happen upon Yuli.
- Sataal: A lazy priest of Pannoval. He has Yuli run errands for him, and serves as his introduction to the priesthood.
- Scoraw: A comrade of Usilk from their time working in a punishment farm. He helps Usilk and Yuli to escape from the underground city of Pannoval.
- Si: The son of Yuli and Iskador. He is named in memory of Yuli’s priest mentor, and becomes a great hunter.
- Sifans: An older priest of Pannoval. He has charge over Yuli during his novitiate period, and reveals secrets of the city to him.
- Tusca: The kindly wife of Kyale. She wishes to be reunited with her son who was taken away by Pannoval authorities for some crime.
- Usilk: A rebellious young man. He helps Yuli to escape from the underground city of Pannoval.
- Yuli: A young man from the frozen surface world who ventures into the underground city of Pannoval. He becomes disillusioned with the local priesthood, then returns to the surface world and, through his leadership, comes to be called Great Yuli.

==== Embruddock ====
- Aoz Roon: A cunning hunter who becomes the new lord of Oldorando. He seizes upon various changes brought about by the changing climate, becomes impatient with the women and their academy, and ends up taking a longer-than-intended leave of absence from Oldorando.
- Amin Lim: A young woman regarded as foolish and wanting to seem important. She aims to accompany Shay Tal as she departs Oldorando.
- Asurr Tal: The grandfather of Shay Tal. He teaches Little Yuli the basics of land-octaves and communication with the souls of the dead.
- Baruin: A hunter and warrior. He helps Little Yuli and Dresyl in the effort to conquer Embruddock.
- Big Afardl: A hunter and warrior. He helps Little Yuli and Dresyl in the effort to conquer Embruddock.
- Calary: A slave boy from Borlien belonging to Aoz Roon. He is offered up as a supplicatory human sacrifice when both of the planet’s suns set at the same time and people fear they may never return.
- Cathkaarnit-he & Cathkaarnit-she: A pair of nomadic Madis travelling across the continent of Campannlat. They unknowingly aid in the spreading of phagor ticks (and thus the plague).
- Cheme Phar: A woman who does some work for Master Datnil Skar. She believes her knowledge of the workings of the corps should afford her membership.
- Cre Tha: A woman of the Den tribe of Embruddock. She becomes the wife of Si.
- Curwayn: A hunter and warrior. He helps Little Yuli and Dresyl in the effort to conquer Embruddock.
- Dathka: A simple man of few words. He is a former apprentice of the metal-makers corps turned hunter who wants to protect Oldorando and his relationships.
- Dol Sakil: The daughter of Rol Sakil. She is an attractive young woman who becomes the wife of Aoz Roon.
- Datnil Skar: An old corps master who respects the efforts of Shay Tal and her academy for women. He errs in revealing secret archived records of the community to Shay Tal, and faces execution for it.
- Dly Hoin: The wife of Dresyl. She was reportedly an attractive but otherwise unsatisfactory partner.
- Dresyl: A cousin of Little Yuli who helped to invade Embruddock and rename it Oldorando. He seeks to fortify and protect the community, but neglects his own family in the process.
- Eline Tal: One of Aoz Roon’s lieutenants. He is a slow but jolly man who is slain by a phagor during a chase.
- Faralin Ferd: One of Aoz Roon’s lieutenants. He aims to usurp control of Oldorando during Aoz Roon’s absence.
- Father of Laintal Ay: Not named. He is killed by a stungebag while on a hunt, forcing Loilanun and her infant son to move in with her parents.
- Farayl Musk: The wife of Tanth Ein. She attempts to conduct an affair with Faralin Ferd.
- Father Bondorlonganon: A priest of Borlien. He comes occasionally to Oldorando for the administration of burial rites.
- Festibariyatid: The warrior-priest of New Ashkitosh. He is busy colonizing areas just south of Sibornal.
- Goija Hin: The slave master of Oldorando. He oversees slaves both human and phagor.
- Hamadranabail: A male gelded slave. He accompanies Shay Tal, handling some arrangements for her and her fellow disciples planning to leave Oldorando.
- Ingsan Atray: The senior master of the metal-makers corps. He is a rather old man who supports the protection of Oldorando’s women, but advises against Shay Tal’s departure.
- Iyfilka: The daughter of Si and Cre Tha, as well as the mother of Dresyl. She is a lovely singer who is later killed in a phagor raid.
- Klils: One son of Dresyl. He tries to rule Oldorando alongside his brother Nahkri, but endures increasing torment by Aoz Roon.
- Laintal Ay: The son of Loilanun and grandson of Little Yuli and Loil Bry. He struggles to decide which is better, unity or independence, and eventually leaves Oldorando after becoming overwhelmed and disillusioned with the various changes in the community.
- Little Yuli: Yuli’s great-grandson. He is a studious and loving man, as well as one of the warriors who conquered Embruddock and renamed it Oldorando.
- Loilanun: The daughter of Little Yuli and Loil Bry, as well as the mother of Laintal Ay. She worries about who shall lead Oldorando, and works with Shay Tal to found an academy dedicated to the pursuit of knowledge.
- Loil Bry: The daughter of Wall Ein and wife of Little Yuli. She engages in mystic practices and stresses to other women the importance of learning before the death of her husband causes her to become consumed with grief.
- Maldik: A hunter and warrior. He helps Little Yuli and Dresyl in the effort to conquer Embruddock.
- Ma Scantiom: A skilled herbalist. She becomes both the new midwife of the community and the first female member of the apothecary’s corps.
- Maysa Latra: A female slave. She accompanies Shay Tal, handling some arrangements for her and her fellow disciples planning to leave Oldorando.
- Molas Ferd: An old woman. She drowns when a local river floods for the first time.
- Nahkri: One son of Dresyl. He tries to rule Oldorando alongside his brother Klils, but endures increasing torment by Aoz Roon.
- Orfik: The son of Si and Cre Tha, as well as the father of Little Yuli. He gives shelter to his nephew, Dresyl, whose parents are killed in a phagor raid.
- Oyre: The daughter of Aoz Roon. She is a kind young woman who befriends Laintal Ay and supports the members of Shay Tal’s academy.
- Rastil Roon: The infant son of Aoz Roon and Dol Sakil. He is born during his father’s absence.
- Raynil Layan: A clever and cautious man involved with local guild activities. He shows a darker side in betraying his mentor, and plans to gain power by introducing a coin mintage to Oldorando.
- Rol Sakil: Mother of Dol. She is a rather old woman, and the former midwife of the community.
- Shay Tal: A confident woman who holds knowledge and independence in high regard. She founds an academy for women, gains a reputation as a sorceress, and aims to leave Oldorando in search of a greater understanding of the world around her.
- Sar Gotth: The husband of Iyfilka, father of Dresyl, and a skilled fisherman. He is killed in a phagor raid.
- Skelit: A hunter and warrior. He helps Little Yuli and Dresyl in the effort to conquer Embruddock.
- Skitosherill: The guard captain of New Ashkitosh, a settlement just south of Sibornal. He fears the plague and, knowing of an approaching phagor horde, strikes a bargain with Laintal Ay to leave the settlement.
- Sparat Lim: A hunter of Oldorando. He assists with post-hunting resource collection.
- Tanth Ein: One of Aoz Roon’s lieutenants. He aims to usurp control of Oldorando during Aoz Roon’s absence.
- Vry: A clever young woman and the chief disciple of Shay Tal. She believes that there is hidden knowledge in the skies, and so begins to observe and calculate the movements of celestial entities.
- Wall Ein: The old lord of Embruddock, now called Oldorando. He relates the old histories and sorrows of his people to Little Yuli and Dresyl.

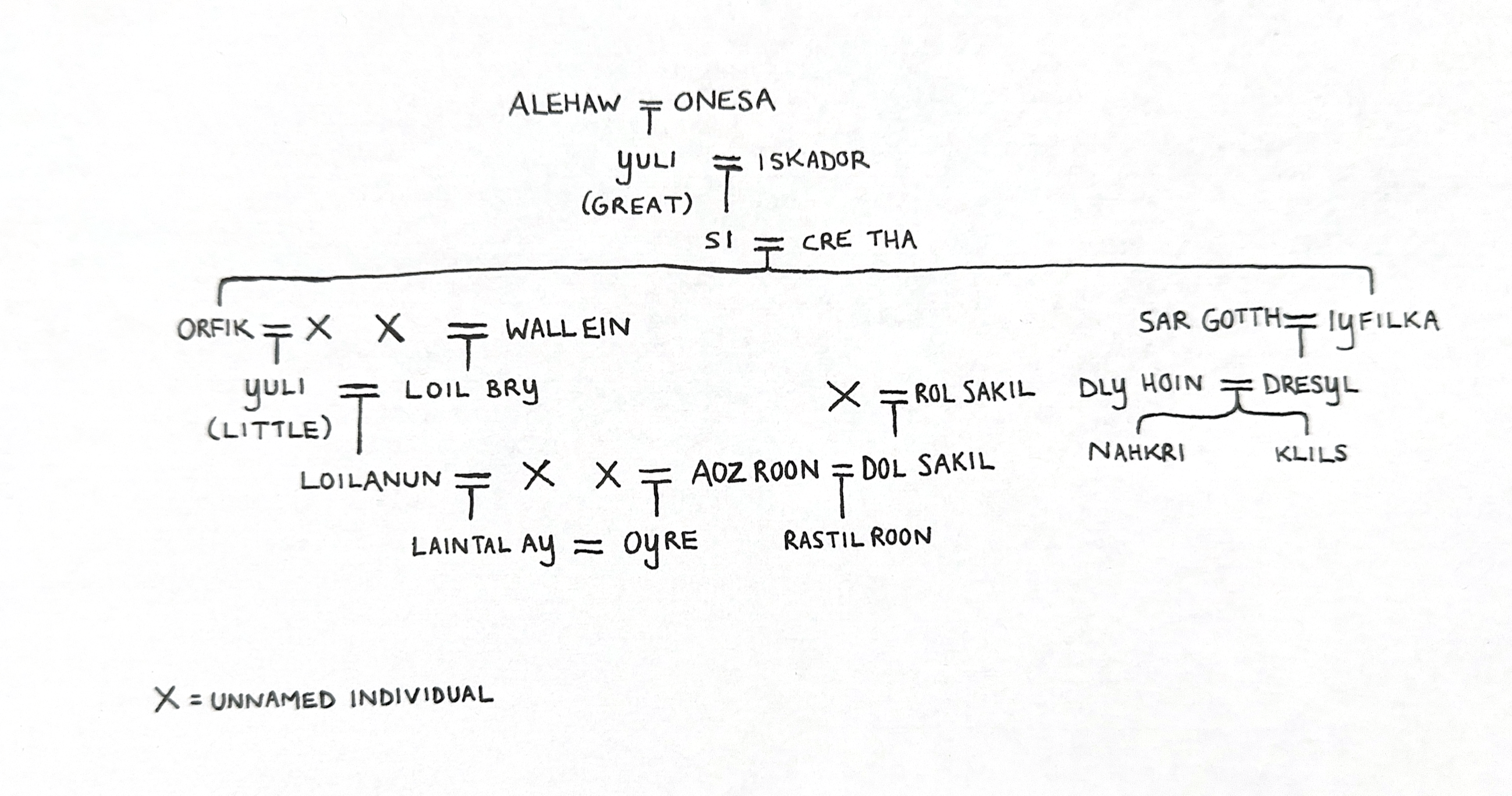
The Lineage of Yuli (as of Helliconia Spring)

=== Phagors ===
- Hrr-Anggl Hhrot: The dead father of Hrr-Brahl Yprt. He offers ancient wisdom to his son from the spirit realm.
- Hrr-Brahl Yprt: A phagor chief who assembles a grand army and crusades southward toward Oldorando, aiming to bring about its destruction so as to avenge his dead grandfather. He has a cowbird familiar named Zzhrrk, and a kaidaw mount named Rukk-Ggrl.
- Hrr-Tryhk Hrast: The grandfather of Hrr-Brahl Yprt. He is an old phagor chief whose capture and subsequent death at the hands of humans in Embruddock sparks the formation of a great crusade.
- Myk: An old and relatively docile phagor who has spent his life in slavery. He claims to know of a time when phagors once ruled over mankind.
- Yhamm-Whrrmar: A fungus-monger phagor who wants nothing to do with the grand ancipital army making progress toward Oldorando. He is marooned on an island with Aoz Roon.
- Yohl-Gharr Wyrrijk: A phagor warrior in the crusade against Oldorando. He commands a portion of Hrr-Brahl Yprt’s forces.

== Calendars ==
Several different calendars are mentioned in the book. The table below includes certain dates that delineate a reckoning of the passage of time.

CALENDARS
1: Avernus (EY)	2: Earth (AD)	3: Helliconia (EYAA)	4: Helliconia (HYAA)	5: Ancipital	6: Lordly	7: After Union	8: Events
2092	5700	0	0	???	N/A	N/A	Apastron
2206	5814	114	80	0	N/A	N/A	Ancipital air-turn calendar is at zero.
???	???	???	???	???	N/A	N/A	"Yuli" prelude story takes place at unspecified period before Great Spring.
2663	6271	571	402	322	0	N/A	Wall Ein Den becomes lord of Embruddock.
2689	6297	597	420	340	18	0	Wall Ein Den has ruled Embruddock for 18 years. Little Yuli and Dresyl conquer the town and unite the two tribes.
2693	6301	601	423	343	21	3	Loilanun is born.
2695	6303	603	425	345	23	5	Aoz Roon is born.
2707	6315	615	433	353	31	13	Laintal Ay is born. Great phagor crusade begins 13-year march toward Oldorando.
2713	6321	621	437	357	35	17	Dly Hoin dies. Dresyl dies shortly afterward.
2715	6323	623	439	359	37	19	"Embruddock" story begins. Little Yuli dies aged 29 (about 41 in Earth-years). Aoz Roon is 14 (about 20 in Earth-years). Laintal Ay is 6 (about 8 in Earth-years).
2718	6326	626	441	361	39	21	Festival of Double Sunset. Great phagor crusade has been on its march for 8 years (and thus has 5 years till it reaches Oldorando).
2726	6334	634	446	367	0	26	"Embruddock" story ends (and thus Book 1 ends). Great phagor crusade reaches Oldorando. Oldorando burns.

Column 1 displays the number of years Avernus has been operational. This is measured in Earth years (EY).

Column 2 displays the current year on Earth, by measure of the Gregorian Calendar ("Anno Domini," AD).

Column 3 displays the current year on Helliconia, as reckoned by Earth Years After Apastron (EYAA). This figure goes up to 2592, the number of small years in a Great Year (by Earth time standard), then resets to 0.

Column 4 displays the current year on Helliconia, as reckoned by Helliconian Years After Apastron (HYAA). This figure goes up to 1825, the number of small years in a Great Year (by Helliconia time standard), then resets to 0.

Column 5 displays the current year on Helliconia, as reckoned by the minds of phagors, and appears to follow the "After-Apastron" dating system (by Helliconia time standard) but is curiously off by about 80 years (the reason for this is never explicitly stated within the story). With this calendar, the small years are also called "air-turns."

Column 6 displays the current year on Helliconia, as reckoned by the common Lordly calendar, which simply counts forward from the accession of the latest local lord (by Helliconia time standard).

Column 7 displays the current year on Helliconia, as reckoned by the newly created After Union calendar, which counts forward from the year the tribes of Oldorando and Embruddock came together (by Helliconia time standard).

Column 8 displays important events occurring at the time noted.

== Reception ==
Dave Pringle reviewed Helliconia Spring for Imagine magazine, and stated that "it seems the hour of the blockbuster has arrived and there is little we can do but submit".

== Reviews ==
- Review by Faren Miller (1982) in Locus, #253 February 1982
- Review by Fritz R. Leiber (1982) in Interzone, #2 Summer 1982
- Review by Roger C. Schlobin (1982) in Fantasy Newsletter, #48 June 1982
- Review by Mary Gentle (1982) in Vector 109
- Review by Darrell Schweitzer (1982) in Science Fiction Review, Fall 1982
- Review by Baird Searles (1982) in Isaac Asimov's Science Fiction Magazine, September 1982
- Review by Tom Easton (1982) in Analog Science Fiction/Science Fact, November 1982
- Review by John Clute (1983) in Omni, March 1983
- Review by Don D'Ammassa (1984) in Science Fiction Chronicle, January 1984
