= Helliconia Summer =

1983 novel by Brian Aldiss

Helliconia Summer is a science fiction novel by British writer Brian Aldiss, published in 1983. It is the second part of the Helliconia trilogy, following Helliconia Spring (1982) and followed by Helliconia Winter (1985).

== Plot summary ==
The novel is set in the world of Helliconia, which is experiencing an intensely hot summer.

== Characters ==
=== Humans ===
==== Campannlat ====
===== Borlien and surrounding areas =====
- AbathVasidol: Daughter of Metty. Also called Abathy. She engages in the same occupation as her mother, and ends up associating with some rather high-profile clients.
- AbstrogAthenat: The royal vicar at Ottassol. He reminds JandolAnganol of the importance of religious penitence.
- Bardol CaraBansity: A scientist residing in Ottassol. He becomes JandolAnganol's new chancellor after SartoriIrvrash is dismissed.
- Bindla CaraBansity: The wife of Bardol. She tries to pull him away from his studies.
- BranzaBaginut: The archpriest of the Matrassyl cathedral. He offers religious guidance to JandalAnganol and reports on unrest in the capital city.
- BudadRembitim: The mayor of Matrassyl and leader of the scritina (parliament) in Borlien. He struggles to handle unrest in the city during JandolAnganol's absence.
- Bull: A sergeant of the Fifth Army of Borlien. He participates in the disastrous Battle of the Cosgatt.
- Darvlish the Skull: A warlord of Thribriat. He once resided in Borlien, but now leads his subhuman Driat forces in a personal war against JandolAnganol, who killed his father.
- FloerCrow: A produce merchant of Borlien. He accompanies his friend, ScufBar, on the way to Ottassol.
- GortorLanstatet: A young lieutenant serving with Hanra. He accompanies the general on his way to meet up with MyrdemInggala.
- Grengo Pallos: An employee of the Lordryardry Ice Trading Company. He manages one of the company's trading posts, providing hospitality and protective services.
- Hanra TolramKetinet: A general of Borlien's military forces, specifically of the Second Army battling (and losing) on the western front in Randonan. Upon receiving an urgent message from MyrdemInggala, he fights his way eastward to meet up with her at Gravabagalinien.
- JandolAnganol: The king of Borlien. He is a deeply religious man who supports coexistence with phagors, and feels pressure on all sides to divorce his beautiful wife so that he may secure a more politically beneficial marriage and bring an end to the wars that threaten his realm.
- KolobEktofer: A major of the Fifth Army of Borlien. He participates in the disastrous Battle of the Cosgatt.
- Mai TolramKetinet: The sister of Hanra. She is MyrdemInggala's chief lady-in-waiting.
- MettyVasidol: An old prostitute running a brothel in Matrassyl. She occasionally associates with a certain ice captain.
- MyrdemInggala: The queen of Borlien. Also called ConegUndunory and Cune. She is a beautiful woman beloved by the common-folk of Borlien and known as the “Queen of Queens,” who now faces grief, humiliation, divorce, and exile.
- RantanOborol: The father of MyrdemInggala. He is a former warlord and baron, now too old to threaten the state and thus banished to the countryside.
- RobaydayAnganol: The prince of Borlien. He is the wild son of JandolAnganol and MyrdemInggala, constantly in a state of disagreement with his father and hoping to avoid any association with him, but his desire for revenge gets him into trouble.
- SartoriIrvrash: Longtime chancellor of Borlien. Also called Rushven. He is an atheist who cares little for politics and more for his personally assembled scholarly archives. Once JandolAnganol dismisses him from office, he travels around the world and ends up learning a great and heretical truth about Helliconia.
- Skrumppabowr: A warlord of Kace. He leads his forces against Oldorando.
- ScufBar: The majordomo of MyrdemInggala while she is at Gravabagalinien. He travels to Ottassol in order to make deliveries on her behalf.
- Shannana: The dead mother of MyrdemInggala. She offers comfort to her daughter, who visits what remains of her soul in the spirit realm.
- SlanjivalIptrekira: JandolAnganol's Royal Armourer and Chief Ironmaster of the Ironmakers Corps. He is willing to help the king in the creation of new weaponry, but makes a grave mistake in attempting to stop JandolAnganol from learning secrets of the corps.
- TatromanAdala: The princess of Borlien. She is the daughter of JandolAnganol and MyrdemInggala, too young to understand the present political and familial turmoils, but one of her storybooks proves to hold hidden knowledge.
- Unndreid the Hammer: A warlord of Mordriat. He maintains a warrior's alliance with Darvlish.
- VarpalAnganol: The father of JandolAnganol. He is an old man kept imprisoned in the dungeons of the royal palace, who offers scathing but sound advice to his son.
- YarapRombry: A learned man who lived during the previous Great Summer. He was a cartographer and astronomer of Kevassien, and a comet is named after him.
- YeferalOborol: The brother of MyrdemInggala. Also called Yef. He is a plain but friendly man who ends up becoming a pawn in the conspiracy to please neighboring nations and bring about a royal divorce.
- Wife of SartoriIrvrash: Unnamed, and died just a few years before the events of the current story. She aided her husband with his genetic breeding experiments, and was one day killed while feeding some of his captive subjects.

===== Oldorando =====
- Bathkaarnet-she: The half-Madi queen of Oldorando. She worries that intolerance against phagors may eventually spill over to intolerance against Madis.
- Crispan Mornu: A gloomy member of the Oldorandan clerisy. He advises Sayren Stund on matters of religion.
- Fard Fantil: The iron furnace master of Oldorando. He passes into the service of JandolAnganol to help him produce functional firearms.
- Kimon Euras: An old minister of the church in Oldorando. He serves as the judge in a grand and scandalous trial.
- Milua Tal: The younger princess of Oldorando. She is one of the few remaining members of Campannlatian royalty available for marriage.
- Sayren Stund: The king of Oldorando. He authorizes wholesale phagor massacres within his country's borders, and aims to have JandolAnganol deposed so as to extend his own reign.
- Simoda Tal: The elder princess of Oldorando. She is meant to wed one royal personage, but has in ill-fated encounter with another.

===== Pannoval =====
- Alam Esomberr: Envoy of the Holy C’Sarr. He serves as representative in political matters while seeking opportunities for advancement.
- C’Sarr Kilandar IX: Holy Emperor of the powerful and theocratic nation of Pannoval, and Father Supreme of the Church of Akhanaba. He is a very aged man making a journey southward to finalize JandolAnganol's bill of divorcement and consequent second marriage, as well as to address spiritual crises.
- Guaddl Ulbobeg: Bishop of Pannoval. He is an old man serving as chief religious advisor to prince Taynth Indredd, and occasionally offers friendly conversation to JandolAnganol.
- Taynth Indredd: Prince of Pannoval. He suggests uniting Oldorando and Borlien by royal marriage as a way to expand the Church of Akhanaba's religious reach.

==== Sibornal ====
- Dienu Pasharatid: The pragmatic wife of Io. She has ideas about how Sibornal could seize upon current political unrest to conquer all of Campannlat.
- Io Pasharatid: The Sibornalese ambassador to Borlien. He engages in shady deals and lusts after MyrdemInggala, wanting her for himself.
- Odi Jeseratabhar: A scholarly woman and priest-militant admiral of Sibornal. She becomes interested in sharing knowledge with fellow intellectual SartoriIrvrash.

==== Hespagorat ====
- Div Muntras: The son of Krillio. He is expected to take over the family business, but cares more about travelling and perhaps finding love.
- Eivi Muntras: The wife of Krillio. She attempts to minister to Billy during his period of illness.
- Immya Muntras: The formidable daughter of Krillio, and chief medical practitioner of Lordryardry. She attempts to understand Billy's illness so that she may help others.
- Krillio Muntras: Captain of an ice trading company based in the Dimariamian town of Lordryardry. He agrees to do a favor for MyrdemInggala, and during his travels ends up taking custody of Billy.
- Lawyer: The husband of Immya, who is not called by any name other than “Lawyer.” He uses his knowledge of the law to benefit (and bother) the Muntras family.

==== Avernus ====
- Billy Xiao Pin: A human who wins the Helliconia Holiday Lottery and descends to the surface of Helliconia, knowing he has only a short time before inevitably succumbing to illness. He is also called BillishOwpin and Bhrl-Hzzh Rowpin. He wishes to meet MyrdemInggala, and one piece of technology he leaves behind changes hands several times.
- Billy's Advisor: An unnamed mentor to Billy during his time on the Avernus. He gives lectures on the virtues of passivity and submission to one's lot.
- Rose Yi Pin: Billy's intended wife before he wins the Helliconia Holiday Lottery. She is upset at his departure, but soon finds a new relationship.

=== Phagors ===
- Lex: A male phagor slave of SartoriIrvrash during his time as chancellor. He kidnaps Billy Xiao Pin so that other phagors can interrogate him.
- Ghht-Mlark Chzarn: A female phagor, and chief-major of JandolAnganol's ancipital forces. She offers help in getting ahold of functional firearms for the king.
- Ghht-Yronz Tharl: A male phagor who oversees an ancipital council operating secretly beneath the city of Matrassyl. He leads an interrogation of Billy Xiao Pin.
- Gleeat: A female phagor captured and interrogated by SartoriIrvrash and Odi Jeseratabhar during their travels. She unintentionally gives SartoriIrvrash a hint about the deeper relationship between humans and phagors.
- Yuli: A male phagor runt who escapes the carnage of the Battle of the Cosgatt, and is thereafter kept as a pet by JandolAnganol.

=== Special mentions ===
Centuries have passed since the events of Helliconia Spring (the first novel in the trilogy), but some characters from that time period are mentioned during the present story, and are remembered in different ways:

- Aoz Roon Den: Remembered as a former ruler of Oldorando. Roons, the coins named after him and minted in Oldorando, are still valid currency. The Pin clan aboard the Avernus has confirmed that Aoz Roon is a distant ancestor of JandolAnganol.
- Hrr-Brahl Yprt: Remembered by ancipitals as a formidable chief who once amassed a grand army and struck down Oldorando. Although his body is now just a small keratinized totem, his spirit remains accessible via tether.
- King Denniss: Banners in cities, especially near churches and monasteries, depict him as a ruler from the previous Great Year. The ancient Denniss pyramid, which once housed pigs in Oldorando, still stands.
- Loil Bry Den: The Loylbryden Square, a public space in Oldorando, is named after the wife of Little Yuli.
- Nahkri & Klils: Not named, but the brothers are mentioned in a chronicle of the reign of Aoz Roon that SartoriIrvrash is studying. They are believed to have ruled the known world before Aoz Roon murdered them. Their inclusion in the chronicle reveals that, despite all attempts to cover up their deaths, they became part of the historical record.
- Raynil Layan: Remembered as a great sage, and revealed to have escaped the burning of Oldorando, an event that occurred centuries ago (i.e. at the end of the previous book). He survived long enough afterward to write and publish a historical treatise, The Testament of RayniLayan, now a widely recognized and respected text.
- Vry Den: Remembered by scholars as an enlightened woman, and revealed to have perished in the burning of Oldorando, an event that occurred centuries ago (i.e. at the end of the previous book). The Church of Akhanaba has its adherents convinced that Vry was not a real person.
- Yuli the Priest: Banners in cities, especially near churches and monasteries, depict him as the founder of Oldorando. JandolAnganol has named his pet phagor Yuli, an act several Oldorandans regard as an insult.

== Calendrical Timekeeping ==
Several different calendars are mentioned in the book. The table below includes certain dates that delineate a reckoning of the passage of time.

CALENDARS
1: Avernus (EY)	2: Earth (AD)	3: Helliconia (EYAA)	4: Helliconia (HYAA)	5: Ancipital	6: Borlien-Oldorando Union	7: After Union	8: Events
2726	6334	634	446	367	0	26	Book 1 ended. Oldorando burned.
3269	6877	1177	828	749	381	408	Book 2 takes place within a single small year.

Column 1 displays the number of years Avernus has been operational. This is measured in Earth years (EY).

Column 2 displays the current year on Earth, by measure of the Gregorian Calendar ("Anno Domini," AD).

Column 3 displays the current year on Helliconia, as reckoned by Earth Years After Apastron (EYAA). This figure goes up to 2592, the number of small years in a Great Year (by Earth time standard), then resets to 0.

Column 4 displays the current year on Helliconia, as reckoned by Helliconian Years After Apastron (HYAA). This figure goes up to 1825, the number of small years in a Great Year (by Helliconia time standard), then resets to 0.

Column 5 displays the current year on Helliconia, as reckoned by the minds of phagors, and appears to follow the "After-Apastron" dating system (by Helliconia time standard) but is curiously off by about 80 years (the reason for this is never explicitly stated within the story). With this calendar, the small years are also called "air-turns."

Column 6 displays the current year on Helliconia, as reckoned by the common Borlien-Oldorando Union calendar (by Helliconia time standard). This was previously called the "Lordly" calendar, and it simply counts forward from the year Oldorando was last sacked by phagors during the onset of the Great Spring.

Column 7 displays the current year on Helliconia, as reckoned by the more recently created After Union calendar, which counts forward from the year the tribes of Oldorando and Embruddock came together (by Helliconia time standard).

Column 8 displays important events occurring at the time noted.

== Reception ==
Dave Langford reviewed Helliconia Summer for White Dwarf #50, and stated that "Fine writing, unforgettable images: and hanging over it all, the doomy awareness of Helliconia-watchers in the orbiting Earth Station Avernus, who know and remind us that all this differs only in detail from the summer of the last Great Year."

Neil Gaiman reviewed Helliconia Summer for Imagine magazine, and stated that "Rich and romantic, the story of the world of Helliconia where the seasons take two thousand years to turn, and humans and the horned and shaggy phagor are locked in continual struggle, is one that continues to echo through the mind long after the last page of the book is finished."

== Reviews ==
- Review by Faren Miller (1983) in Locus, #272 September 1983
- Review by Frank Catalano (1984) in Amazing Stories, July 1984
- Review by Tom Easton (1984) in Analog Science Fiction/Science Fact, July 1984
- Review by Don D'Ammassa (1985) in Science Fiction Chronicle, #64 January 1985
- Review by Peter Caracciolo (1985) in Foundation, #35 Winter 1985/1986, (1986)
