= Helliconia Winter =

Helliconia Winter is a novel by Brian W. Aldiss published in 1985. It is the third part of the Helliconia trilogy, following Helliconia Spring (1982) and Helliconia Summer (1983).

== Plot summary ==
The third part of the trilogy, Helliconia Winter is set during late autumn in the northern continent, Sibornal. The book's protagonist, Luterin Shokerandit, is the son of the Keeper of the Wheel of Kharnabar, located above the far north of Helliconia. The Wheel is an extraordinary revolving monastery/prison built into a ring-shaped tunnel with a single entrance and exit, powered entirely by the efforts of the prisoners pulling it along by means of chains set into the outer wall. Once a prisoner enters a cell of the Wheel, it is impossible for him to leave until its full ten-year rotation has passed.

Luterin joins the army, where he gains renown by killing the commandant of an enemy battalion, taking his widow Toress Lahl as a slave. Soon, however, the first cases of Fat Death begin to appear in the Sibornalese army. The Oligarch, autocratic ruler of Sibornal, orders other troops to destroy this army in an attempt to halt the spread of the epidemic. Luterin is warned by Captain Fashnalgid in time for the two of them to escape with Toress Lahl and a foreign trader who has arranged for a ship to flee the area. While the ship is at sea, the Fat Death spreads among those aboard; however, thanks to the skills of Toress Lahl, who was trained as a doctor, the major characters survive. It is during this voyage that a great deal of information is discovered about the deep past of the Helliconia-Batalix solar system, its capture by Freyr, and the intertwined fates of humans and phagors.

After the ship lands, the Oligarch's army continues to pursue the deserters. They go on the run again, hiring a dog-sledge with a semi-human driver and his phagor slave in order to cross the mountains. Fashnalgid mortally offends their driver by sleeping with his wife, and the driver retaliates by arranging for his phagor to push Fashnalgid off the sledge while they are travelling through a dangerous tunnel. Luterin tries to save Fashnalgid, but also falls from the sledge. He is forced to walk for miles through the polar cold until he eventually rejoins the sledge and is able to travel the rest of the way to his father's estate.

Once home, Luterin proclaims that he wishes to marry Toress Lahl rather than his arranged noble bride, and gives Toress the key to an ancient shrine. A few days later, he expresses hatred for the Oligarch who ordered his army to be destroyed. From his father's reactions, he realises that his father is in fact the Oligarch. Luterin kills his father and flees to the Wheel of Kharnabar; he enters the Wheel and therefore remains in solitary confinement for ten years. When he at last emerges, he finds that the assassination of the former Oligarch is now seen as a positive event.

A party is arranged to celebrate Luterin's freedom and also to observe the day of Myrkwyr, when Freyr is seen for the last time, marking the beginning of the centuries-long great winter. After the festivities, the Master of Kharnabar has Luterin seized, with the intent of throwing him back into the Wheel. For phagors, Myrkwyr indicates the return of conditions favourable to their kind, and a phagor tribe makes plans to regain their dominance over humans. The phagors attack the party; Luterin escapes in the confusion and is reunited with Toress Lahl. The book ends as they leave for the shrine, where she has been living in hiding with their now ten-year-old son.

== Characters ==
=== Main story ===
- Bandal Eith Lahl: The Commandant of a Borldoranian Battalion. He leads his forces during the battle at Isturiacha.
- Besi Besamitikahl: The first mistress of Eedap Mun Odim. She is a clever and kind woman who gets by using her charms.
- Bhryeer: A phagor slave in service to Uuundaamp. He has orders to rid the travelling party of one member.
- Chubsalid: The Priest-Supreme of the Church of Formidable Peace in Sibornal. He calls for the Church to make a public stand against the Oligarchy and its increasing tyranny.
- Devit Asperamanka: The Archpriest-Militant of Sibornal. He proves rather merciless in his personal quest for power.
- Drikstalgil: A liegeman of the Estate of the Keeper of the Wheel of Kharnabhar. He follows orders to slay ancipitals.
- Ebstok Esikananzi: The father of Insil. He is the head of a powerful family, and is in a position to become the new Keeper of the Wheel of Kharnabhar.
- Eedap Mun Odim: A porcelain trader of Koriantura. He is a friendly man who has always tried to live honestly and work hard in order to support his very large family.
- Evanporil: The secretary of the Estate of the Keeper of the Wheel of Kharnabhar. He is an old administrator who spends much of his time fussing over documents and dispatching instructions to the estate’s workers.
- Ermine: A human living on Earth in the 7500s AD. She is the sister of Shoyshal.
- Favin Shokerandit: The late older brother of Luterin. He died some time before the events of the story, supposedly after learning a terrible secret.
- Gagrim: A slave belonging to Eedap Mun Odim. He witnesses a horrific death while Odim is settling his affairs in Koriantura.
- Gardeterark: A major of the Oligarch’s first guard in the Sibornalese military. He disseminates some of the Oligarch’s regulatory edicts to the people of Koriantura, and causes some trouble for Eedap Mun Odim. He is also the uncle of a woman Harbin Fashnalgid once disgraced.
- Harbin Fashnalgid: A captain of the Sibornalese military. He is a womanizer who is ordered to arrange the forces necessary to kill Asperamanka’s entire army for fear of the plague it may bring back to Sibornal. His father, who sold him into the military, claims once to have been a member of the Oligarchy.
- Hernisarath: A friend of the Shokerandit family who runs a farm and a hostel for pilgrims in Rivenjk. He gives Luterin a letter of credit so he may purchase transportation out of the port town.
- Insil Esikananzi: A clever and somewhat bitter young noblewoman of Sibornal. She is Luterin’s intended bride who claims to know the truth behind some dark secrets of the Shokerandit and Esikananzi families.
- Ipaak: An Ondod woman. She knew Luterin before the events of the story, and had sexual relations with him in his younger years.
- Jheserabhay: An old painter and friend of Eedap Mun Odim. He receives an exquisite gift while Odim is settling his affairs in Koriantura.
- Kenigg: The son of Eedap Mun Odim. He is among the few survivors of an outbreak of Fat Death aboard a ship sailing for Shivenink.
- Liparotin: A mute hunting captain. He accompanies Luterin’s father while he is supposedly away on hunting trips.
- Lobanster Shokerandit: The father of Luterin. He is the Keeper of the revered Wheel of Kharnabhar, and is often away from home, supposedly on hunting trips.
- Lourna Shokerandit: The mother of Luterin. She is often ill and confined to the house.
- Luterin Shokerandit: A young nobleman of Sibornal. He enlists in the military at his father’s instruction, and after a briefly triumphant but ultimately disastrous military career he attempts to make his way home to Kharnabhar at all costs.
- Moub: The wife of Uuundaamp. She is pregnant and prepares to give birth to a son along the present journey northward.
- Naipundeg: A former captain of the Sibornalese military. He was killed before the events of the story during a drunken duel with Harbin Fashnalgid.
- Odirin Nan Odim: The brother of Eedap Mun Odim. He is a trader living in Rivenjk, a port town of Shivenink.
- Parlingelteg: A younger priest-chaplain of the Church of Formidable Peace in Sibornal. He believes the Oligarchy is enacting various regulations that strip the people of individual liberties in order to cover up its own atrocities.
- Rostadal: A prostitute of Askitosh. She offers her services to Harbin Fashnalgid before he transfers from that city to Koriantura.
- SartoriIrvrash: A human living on Earth in the 7500s AD. He is mentor to Trockern, and thinks human possessiveness is rooted in anger. He named himself after a learned man who once lived on Helliconia.
- Shoyshal: A human living on Earth in the 7500s AD. She is the sister of Ermine.
- Toress Lahl: A doctor originally from Oldorando. When her husband Bandal is killed in a battle, she becomes the captive slave of Luterin and joins him on his journey to Kharnabhar.
- Torkerkanzlag II: The public name of the Supreme Oligarch of Sibornal. He is an exceedingly secretive man in charge of pulling the strings behind the various state functionings of Sibornal.
- Trockern: A human living on Earth in the 7500s AD. He uses intellectual musings to impress women, and thinks human possessiveness is rooted in fear.
- Umat Esikananzi: The brother of Insil. He serves alongside Luterin in the military.
- Uuundaamp: An Ondod dogsled driver. He makes regular journeys northward to Kharnabhar. His lead asokin sled-dog is also named Uuundaamp.
- Yaringa: The sister of Lourna and aunt of Luterin. She is an emotional woman who wishes to sing songs to celebrate Luterin’s return home.
- Yuli: A human slave. He is killed during a mass slaughter that takes place at Isturiacha when the abandonment of that settlement requires all human slaves to be released or killed.

=== Special mentions ===
Centuries have passed since the events of Helliconia Summer (the second novel in the trilogy), but some characters from the past are mentioned during the present story, and are remembered in different ways:

- Akha/Akhanaba: At least one prayer to Akha is found inscribed upon the wall while Luterin is imprisoned in the Great Wheel of Kharnabhar. The Church of Akhanaba, at its height during the Great Summer, is now all but vanquished, thought the ancient god is still worshipped by a small religious sect known as the Takers of Pannoval.
- Billy Xiao Pin: Billy’s high-tech wristwatch, last known to be in the possession of JandolAnganol, is revealed to have ended up in a shop of oddities in Southern Sibornal. Luterin saw it himself while given one night’s leave from the military.
- Immya Muntras: Revealed to have taken over the Muntras family trading company. She made her way northward during her travels and met up with JandolAnganol, then used her experience as a healer to spread knowledge of the workings of the plague. Immya’s bones and scholarly papers remain in the chapel where Toress Lahl spends ten years hiding and raising a son.
- JandolAnganol: The former king of Borlien and Oldorando, the lands that would become the joint monarchy of Borldoran. The Sibornalese remember him as a holy man who served a term in the Great Wheel and founded a small church in Kharnabhar, while Borldoranians remember him as a villain who eradicated the old religion and defeated its god Akhanaba. Toress Lahl claims JandolAnganol is a distant ancestor of hers.
- Kilandar IX: The last C’Sarr of Pannoval. Revealed to have perished in the burning of the royal palace of Oldorando (an event that occurred almost five local centuries earlier, i.e. at the end of the previous book). Many people believe the god Akhanaba took him while departing the world. After his death, the religious unity over much of Campannlat fell apart.
- SartoriIrvrash: A learned old man living on Earth in the 7500s AD remembers the ex-chancellor of Borlien as a dangerous old sage, and has even named himself after him.
- Sayren Stund: The former king of Oldorando. Revealed to have perished in the burning of the royal palace of Oldorando (an event that occurred almost five local centuries earlier, i.e. at the end of the previous book). Many people believe the god Akhanaba took him while departing the world.
- Yuli: A human slave killed at Isturiacha was named Yuli, suggesting that the name of Oldorando’s founder may have become common by this time.

== Calendars ==
Several different calendars are mentioned in the book. The table below includes certain dates that delineate a reckoning of the passage of time.

CALENDARS
1: Avernus (EY)	2: Earth (AD)	3: Helliconia (EYAA)	4: Helliconia (HYAA)	5: Ancipital	6: Borlien-Oldorando Union	7: After Union	8: Events
2726	6334	634	446	367	0	26	Book 1 ended.
3269	6877	1177	828	749	381	408	Book 2 ended.
3947	7555	1855	1306	1227	859	886	Book 3 "prelude" occurs. Luterin recovers from paralysis.
3950	7558	1858	1308	1229	861	888	Book 3 main story occurs. Last Battle at Chalce.
3965	7573	1873	1319	1240	872	899	Book 3 ends. Festival of Myrkwyr.

Column 1 displays the number of years Avernus has been operational. This is measured in Earth years (EY).

Column 2 displays the current year on Earth, by measure of the Gregorian Calendar ("Anno Domini," AD).

Column 3 displays the current year on Helliconia, as reckoned by Earth Years After Apastron (EYAA). This figure goes up to 2592, the number of small years in a Great Year (by Earth time standard), then resets to 0.

Column 4 displays the current year on Helliconia, as reckoned by Helliconian Years After Apastron (HYAA). This figure goes up to 1825, the number of small years in a Great Year (by Helliconia time standard), then resets to 0.

Column 5 displays the current year on Helliconia, as reckoned by the minds of phagors, and appears to follow the "After-Apastron" dating system (by Helliconia time standard) but is curiously off by about 80 years (the reason for this is never explicitly stated within the story). With this calendar, the small years are also called "air-turns."

Column 6 displays the current year on Helliconia, as reckoned by the common Borlien-Oldorando Union calendar (by Helliconia time standard). This was previously called the "Lordly" calendar, and it simply counts forward from the year Oldorando was sacked by phagors during the onset of the Great Spring.

Column 7 displays the current year on Helliconia, as reckoned by the more recently created After Union calendar, which counts forward from the year the tribes of Oldorando and Embruddock came together (by Helliconia time standard).

Column 8 displays important events occurring at the time noted.

== Reception ==
Dave Langford reviewed Helliconia Winter for White Dwarf #67, and stated that "In Winter, scenes on Earth and the orbiting Avernus Station (sketchy and less successful than the main narrative) offer two escape routes from cyclic history: enlightenment and extinction. All this and a gripping story too, of battle, murder and plague."

Neil Gaiman reviewed Helliconia Winter for Imagine magazine, and stated that "Rich and romantic, the story of the world of Helliconia where the seasons take two thousand years to turn, and humans and the horned and shaggy phagor are locked in continual struggle, is one that continues to echo through the mind long after the last page of the book is finished."

== Reviews ==
- Review by Faren Miller (1985) in Locus, #290 March 1985
- Review by Michael R. Collings (1985) in Fantasy Review, April 1985
- Review by Joseph Nicholas (1985) in Vector 127
- Review by Tom Easton (1985) in Analog Science Fiction/Science Fact, Mid-December 1985
- Review by Peter Caracciolo (1985) in Foundation, #35 Winter 1985/1986, (1986)
- Review by Thomas D. Clareson (1986) in Extrapolation, Spring 1986
