= Steve Ellis (literary scholar) =

British poet and literary scholar

- Born: 1952 (age 73–74); York, England
- Education: University College London (PhD)
- Scientific career
- Institutions: University of Birmingham
- Thesis: The poets' Dante from Shelley to T. S. Eliot (1981)

Steve Ellis (born 1952) is a British poet and literary scholar and Professor of English Literature at the University of Birmingham. He is known for his works on Chaucer, Virginia Woolf and T. S. Eliot. and also for his verse translation of Dante's Divine Comedy, published in 2019.

== Works ==
- Dante and English Poetry: Shelley to T. S. Eliot (1983)
- Home and Away (1987)
- West Pathway (1993)
- Verse translation of Dante's Hell (1991)
- The English Eliot: Design, Language, and Landscape in Four Quartets (1991)
- British writers and the approach of World War II
- Chaucer at large: the poet in the modern imagination
- Chaucer: The Canterbury Tales
- T. S. Eliot: a guide for the perplexed
- Virginia Woolf and the Victorians
