= A Double-Threaded Life =

1982 play by Maryat Lee

A Double-Threaded Life: The Hinton Play is a play by the American playwright Maryat Lee. An example of the Ecotheater Lee made famous, it consists of a series of monologues and dialogues co-written by the people of Hinton, West Virginia.

== Background ==
After a successful series of street theatre plays in New York City, Lee (originally from Kentucky) moved back to Appalachia, to Summers County, West Virginia, in 1971, leaving the city also on the advice of her friend Flannery O'Connor. She bought a farm and wrote, and ran acting workshops for the locals, including inmates of the Federal Women's Prison in the county. It took her a while to gain the trust of the local population, but she did, and wrote and produced a number of Ecotheater plays featuring local people as actors, including one play named for the folklore legend John Henry. A Double-Threaded Life came about on the suggestion of a friend of hers, Jinx Johnson from Hinton.

== Script and actors ==
The particular free form of A Double-Threaded Life finds its origin in Lee's work as a street theatre director, in 1950s Harlem, where she fashioned scripts out of the oral histories brought to her by the actors, who improvised on given situations during rehearsal. Part of the rationale for this method was to encourage actors to acquire "the self-perception and ultimately the communal experience that Lee believes in so fervently", according to William French. Lee's method thus was diametrically opposed to the Stanislavski method: "Stanislavski wanted the actor to identify with and become his or her role; Lee tries to help the actor grow to his or her fullest, to realize what is most hidden within the self".

The script for A Double-Threaded Life derived from actors' suggestions—the actors being the people of Hinton, West Virginia, a city of less than 3,000 in rural Summers County, West Virginia. One such actor was a local fisherman who improvised a scene based on a short script about fishing, a favorite pastime in that part of Appalachia. Actors were amateurs who frequently thought acting an odd activity; French reports that there were frequent conflicts during rehearsal, with actors quitting in tears of frustration, but that a significant number of actors considered their experience working on Lee's play to be life-changing.

French traces the development of one particular scene to exemplify Lee's method. A first version of a scene was written on Lee's request by a former railroad engineer and mayor of Hinton, Sims Wicker; Hinton's economy had been based to an important degree on the maintenance of steam locomotives, and the transition of railroad engines to diesel in the 1950s practically destroyed the local economy. She in turn rewrote the scene, making it more economic and coherent, adding detail she had learned from Wicker and his colleagues. A third version benefited from improvisation during rehearsal, with the addition of detail about two watches—railroadmen being well known for an obsession with time—that improved character revelation. A fourth version was written when only a female actor was available for the part, and the gender tension—between the female actor playing the role of a female brakeman and the original brakeman—was made part of the scene.

== Production ==
Staging the play was a low-key and low-budget affair. Lighting consisted of two scoop lamps mounted on wooden poles. As with all of Lee's Ecotheater productions, a backdrop for the playing area (no stage) is typically made with 2x4 lumber and brackets, and can be set up just about anywhere in a very short period or time—in a parking lot, a field, yards, a room in a prison.
