= Kateryna Mikhalitsyna =

Ukrainian poet, children's writer and translator

- Катерина Міхаліцина
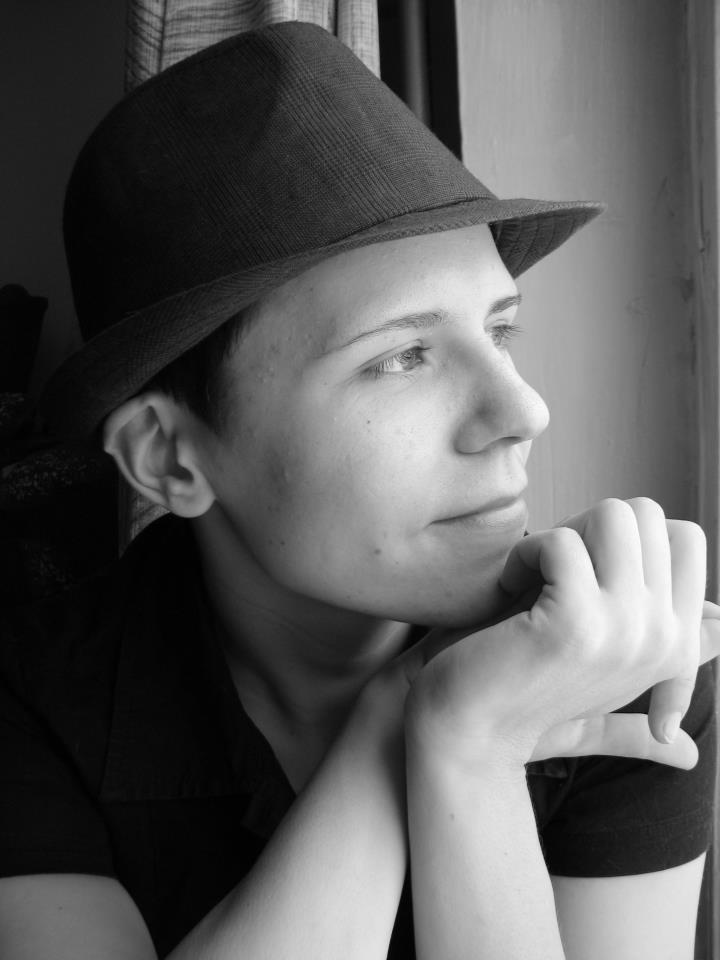
- Born: February 23, 1982 (age 44); Mlyniv, Soviet Union
- Occupations: poet, children's writer, translator

Kateryna Mikhalitsyna (Ukrainian: Катерина Василівна Міхаліцина; born February 23, 1982) is a Ukrainian poet, children's writer, translator and editor.

== Early life and education ==
Kateryna Mikhalitsyna was born on February 23, 1982, in Mlyniv. In 2003, she completed undergraduate studies in biology in Rivne. Six years later, she graduated in English studies from the Ivan Franko National University of Lviv. She took on various jobs, then in 2008–2012 worked as an editor and translator at the Astroliabia Publishing House. In 2013, she took on the role of the deputy editor-in-chief of the Old Lion Publishing House, Mariana Savka. In 2014–2015 she took part in Lithuanian-Ukrainian translation studies.

== Career ==
Mikhalitsyna has published three poetry collections and a number of children's books. As a writer, editor and a translator, she took part in various literary projects and events, such as the all-Ukrainian Add Reading! Initiative, Bologna Children's Literature Exhibition, Publishers’ Forum, and was a beneficiary of the Frankfurt Fellowship Programme at the Frankfurt Book Fair. Her poems have been translated into Bulgarian, Polish, German, Lithuanian, Russian, Swedish, Armenian and Greek. Her children's books Who grows in the park and Reactors do not explode. A short history of the Chernobyl disaster (written together with Stanislav Dvornytskiy) were included in the White Ravens catalogues of 2016 and 2021, respectively.

Mikhalitsyna has translated from English and Polish, including works by J. R. R. Tolkien, Oscar Wilde, Sylvia Plath and Alfred Szklarski. She is a member of PEN Ukraine.

She lives in Lviv.

== Publications ==
=== Poetry ===
- The Flood, 2000
- Pilgrim (self-published), 2002
- Shadow in the Mirror, 2013; ill.: Aliena Semchyshyn

=== Children's literature ===
- Rainbow Over the Meadow, 2012, ill.: Yulia Polishchuk
- Grandma’s Abode, 2013, ill.: Natalka Haida
- Meadow Rhyme, 2015, ill.: Mariana Petriv
- Who Grows in the Park, 2016, ill.: Oksana Bula
- About Dragons and Happiness, 2016, ill.: Natalka Haida
- Who Grows in the Garden, 2017, ill.: Oksana Bula
- Yas and his Cars, 2018, ill.: Tetiana Tsiupka
- Yas and His Great Bikecareer, 2019, ill.: Tetiana Tsiupka
- Dmukhavka and Other Furry Little Poems, 2019, ill.: Yulia Pylypchatyna
- Tomo and his Whale, 2019, ill.: Oksana Drachkovska
- Reactors do not explode. A short history of the Chernobyl disaster, 2020, co-author: Stanislav Dvornytskiy
