= Plato the Myth Maker =

Book by Luc Brisson

- Author: Luc Brisson
- Original title: Platon, les mots et les mythes
- Translator: Gerard Naddaf
- Language: French
- Publisher: Éditions Maspero
- Publication date: 1982
- Publication place: France
- English publication date: 1 May 1998
- Pages: 238
- ISBN: 978-2-7071-1326-9

Plato the Myth Maker (French: Platon, les mots et les mythes, lit. 'Plato, the words and the myths') is a book by the Canadian historian and anthropologist Luc Brisson, published in 1982. An English translation was published in 1998.

== Background ==
What would become Plato the Myth Maker began as a collaboration between Luc Brisson and Marcel Detienne. Eventually it became clear that their respective views of myth differed too much, and they wrote separate books.

== Summary ==
The story of Atlantis is the starting point for a lexicographical study of Plato's conception of muthos, or myth. Plato was the first to use this word to refer to a fictional story. The second half of the book concerns logos, which Plato used in contrast with muthos and regarded as the superior of the two.

== Reception ==
Pierre Ellinger wrote in L'Homme that Plato the Myth Maker benefits greatly from its methodology which draws from communication theory. Ellinger wrote that the book is valuable both because it traces the history of the concept of myth, and because it manages to outline the role of the myth in ancient Greece. In The Review of Politics, Edward Andrew called it "a remarkably fine book, always thought-provoking even when it remains captive to the mythology of scientific scholarship".
