= Alejandro Núñez Alonso =

Spanish novelist, journalist and screenwriter

Alejandro Núñez Alonso (1905 – 7 October 1982) was a Spanish historical novelist, journalist and screenwriter.
