= Luc Brisson =

Canadian scholar

- Born: March 10, 1946 (age 80); Saint-Esprit, Quebec, Canada
- Occupation: Historian of philosophy
- Awards: CNRS Bronze medal
- Honors: Fellow of Lincean Academy and Royal Society of Canada

Luc Brisson (born 10 March 1946 in Saint-Esprit, Quebec) is a Canadian (and from 1986 also French) historian of philosophy and anthropologist of antiquity. He is emeritus director of research at the CNRS in France.

== Life ==
Brisson was born in a small agricultural village in Québec in 1946. All his education was received in the ecclesiastically administered and staffed schools, seminaries, and universities of Québec. At the end of the sixties he joined the general movement of Québec students to Paris, where he undertook a thesis on the Timaeus of Plato, under the direction of Clémence Ramnoux at Paris X Nanterre. During 1971-1972 he was a visiting scholar at Balliol College, Oxford. His studies include several years of Sanskrit. Upon the completion of his Ph.D. thesis, and through the support of Jean Pépin, who shared his interest in the ancient treatment of myth, Brisson was attached to the CNRS in 1974. In 1975 he was awarded the Zographos Prize for his systematic commentary on Timaeus, Le Même et l’Autre dans la structure ontologique du Timée de Platon.

Despite his wider philosophical interests, he says that "I can be defined as 'an historian of philosophy' whose domain of research is Plato and Platonism." His historical work includes several studies of Neoplatonism including new French translations of Plotinus.

Brisson's range and quantity of publications has been very large, but the topic of the relation between myth and reason has dominated. At home neither in Québec nor in France, Brisson feels himself to be a kind of Platonic "nomad." For him, as for Pierre Hadot, philosophy is “a spiritual exercise destined to transform the life of the individual who gives himself up to it.”

== Works ==
=== English translations ===
- Inventing the Universe: Plato's Timaeus, the Big Bang, and the Problem of Scientific Knowledge, Albany: State University of New York Press, 1995.
- Plato the Myth Maker, Chicago: University of Chicago Press, 2000. ISBN 9782707113269.
- Sexual ambivalence: Androgyny and Hermaphroditism in Graeco-Roman Antiquity, Berkeley: University of California Press, 2002. ISBN 9780520223912.
- How Philosophers Saved Myths: Allegorical Interpretation and Classical Mythology, University of Chicago Press, 2008. ISBN 9780226075389.
- Plato's Philebus: selected papers from the Eighth Symposium Platonicum, with John M. Dillon, Sankt Augustin: Academia, 2010.
- Dialogues on Plato's Politeia (Republic): selected papers from the Ninth Symposium Platonicum, with Noburu Notomi, Sankt Augustin: Academia Verlag, 2013.
- Neoplatonic Demons and Angels, Leiden/Boston: Brill, 2018.

=== Original French works ===
- Le mythe de Tirésias, essai d’analyse structurale, Leiden, Brill, 1976. doi:10.1163/9789004295285.
- Éros, París, Flammarion, 1980
- Lectures de Platon. Paris, J. Vrin, 2000. ISBN 2-7116-1455-7.
- Orphée et l’orphisme dans l’Antiquité greco-romaine, Londres, Variorum, 1995. ISBN 9780860784531.
- Puissance et limites de la raison. Le probleme des valeurs, Paris, Les Belles Lettres, 1995, with Walter Meyerstein
- Poèmes magiques et cosmopologiques / Orphée, Paris, Les Belles Lettres, 1995
- Le sexe incertain: androgynie et hermaphrodisme dans l’antiquité gréco-romaine, Paris, Les Belles Lettres, 1997. ISBN 9782251324258.
- Matière et devenir dans les philosophies anciennes, Paris, Presses Universitaires de France, 2003, joint volume.
- Etudes platoniciennes VI, Paris, Les Belles Lettres, 2004, with Jean-François Pradeau.
- Lectures de Platon, Paris, Vrin, 2000. ISBN 9782711614554.
- Platon 1990-1995: Bibliographie, Paris, J. Vrin, 1999. ISBN 2-7116-1412-3, with Frédéric Plin.
- Introduction a la Philosophie du mythe I et II, Paris, Vrin, 1997–2000, with Christoph Jamme.
- Les écrits socratiques de Xénophon, Paris, Presse Universitaire de France, 2004. ISBN 978-2-251-42049-3.
- Platon 1995-2000: Bibliographie, Paris, J. Vrin, 2007. ISBN 2-7116-1698-3, with B. Castelnerac and F. Plin.
- Le même et l'autre dans la structure ontologique du Timée de Platon. Un commentaire systématique du Timée de Platon, Paris, Klincksieck, 1974 (4th edn, with an added bibliography 1998–2015, Sankt Augustin Academia Verlag, 2015).

See the French Wikipedia article for a comprehensive list.

=== Translations of Plato ===
- Lettres, Paris, Flammarion, 1987. (GF; 466).
- Apologie de Socrate. Criton, 3rd ed., Paris, Flammarion, 2005. ISBN 2-08-070848-1.
- Timée. Critias; 2nd ed., Paris, Garnier-Flammarion, 1995. ISBN 2-08-070618-7.
- Parménide, Paris, Garnier-Flammarion, 1994. ISBN 2-08-070688-8.
- Le banquet, 4th ed., Paris, Flammarion, 2005. ISBN 2-08-070987-9.
- Phèdre, 6th ed., together with La pharmacie de Platon by Jacques Derrida. Paris, Flammarion, 2004. ISBN 2-08-070488-5.
- Le politique, Paris, Flammarion, 2003. (ISBN 2-08-071156-3, with Jean-François Pradeau.
- Les lois. I-VI, Paris, Flammarion, 2006. ISBN 2-08-071059-1 with Jean-François Pradeau.
- Les lois. VII-XII; Paris, Flammarion, 2006. ISBN 2-08-071257-8, with Jean-François Pradeau.
- Œuvres complètes in one volume, Luc Brisson (ed.), Flammarion, 2011. ISBN 978-2-0812-4937-0.
- Apologie de Socrate, Criton: traductions, introductions, notes, chronologie et bibliographies (5th corrected and updated edn), Flammarion, 2017. ISBN 978-2-0814-1602-4

== See also ==
- Diophantus of Abae
