= Mi Cocina (book) =

1982 Venezuelan cookbook

Book cover

Mi Cocina: A la manera de Caracas (lit. 'My Kitchen: Caracas-Style'), also known as the Libro Rojo (Red Book), is a cooking book on traditional Venezuelan recipes published in 1982 by Venezuelan gastronome Armando Scannone, as well as the first volume in a series of books. It is regarded as a benchmark of Venezuelan gastronomy and one of the best-selling books in the country’s history.

== Publication ==
In 1960, Armando Scannone began the task of collecting traditional Venezuelan recipes with the help of his cook and housekeeper. He dedicated approximately ten years to cataloging, measuring, testing, and compiling these recipes. He was initially unable to publish his first book, Mi Cocina, in Venezuela, as no local publisher was willing to take it on. In 1982, he succeeded in publishing it through a Spanish publisher and imported the books to Venezuela, where it quickly became a bestseller. Several other volumes followed.
