= Armando Scannone =

Venezuelan gastronomist and engineer

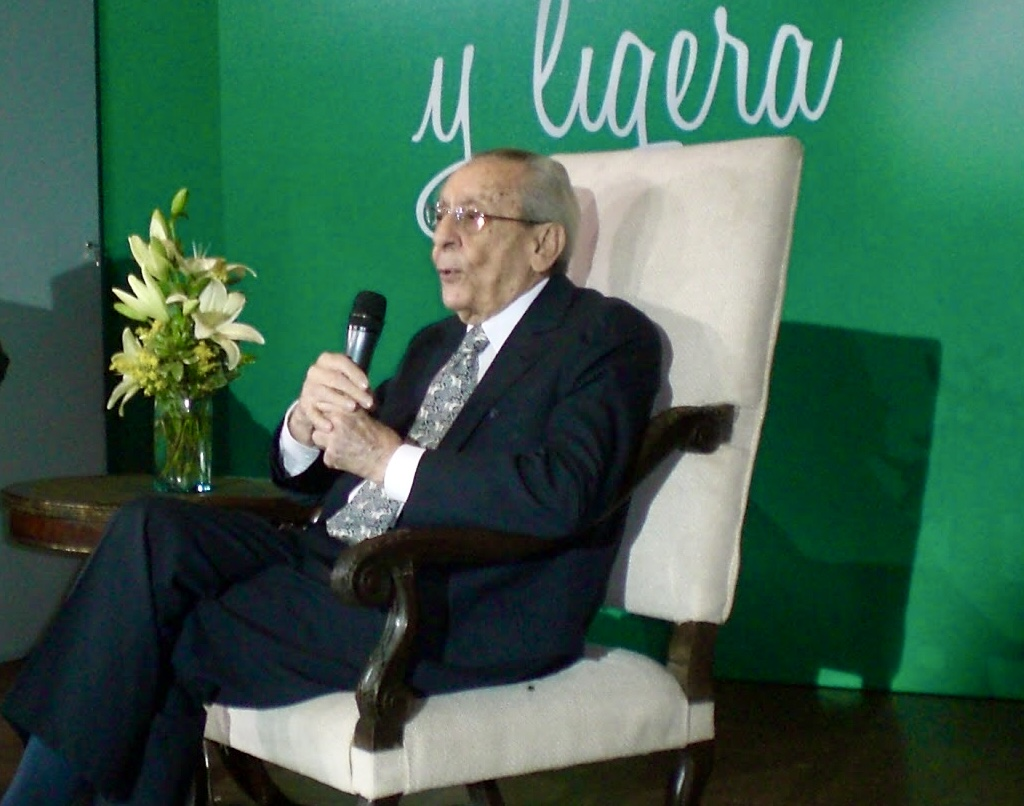
- Born: August 22, 1922; Caracas, Venezuela
- Died: December 9, 2021 (aged 99); Caracas, Venezuela
- Citizenship: Venezuelan
- Education: Central University of Venezuela
- Occupations: Engineer and gastronome

Armando Scannone Tempone (Caracas, August 22, 1922 – Caracas, December 9, 2021) was a Venezuelan engineer and gastronome, best known for Mi Cocina: A la manera de Caracas, a series of books on traditional Venezuelan recipes. The first volume, published in 1982 and popularly known as "Scannone's red book", is regarded as a benchmark of Venezuelan gastronomy and one of the best-selling books in the country’s history.

He served as vice president of the Venezuelan College of Engineers and was the founding president of the Venezuelan Academy of Gastronomy.

== Biography ==
He was the son of Armando Scannone and Antonieta Tempone, both of Italian descent. His parents were committed to raising him with a strong foundation in Venezuelan culinary traditions.

He studied civil engineering at the Central University of Venezuela and served on the board of directors of its student center.

In 1960, he began the task of collecting traditional Venezuelan recipes with the help of his cook and housekeeper. He dedicated approximately ten years to cataloging, measuring, testing, and compiling these recipes.

He was initially unable to publish his first book, Mi Cocina, in Venezuela, as no local publisher was willing to take it on. In 1982, he succeeded in publishing it through a Spanish publisher and imported the books to Venezuela, where it quickly became a bestseller. Several other volumes followed, including the blue book of Venezuelan Creole cuisine, the green book of light recipes, the orange book of school snacks, and the yellow book featuring a catalog of menus.

== Featured books ==
- Mi Cocina (1982), known as the red book.
- Mi Cocina II (1994), known as the blue book.
- Menús de Mi Cocina (2010), known as the yellow book.
- Mi Cocina ligera (2010), also known as the green book.
- Mi Lonchera (2013), known as the orange book.

== Honors ==
The annual Armando Scanonne Award of the Venezuelan Academy of Gastronomy (AVG) is named after him.
