= Helliconia =

Science fiction trilogy written by Brian Aldiss

Helliconia Spring; Helliconia Summer; Helliconia Winter
- Author: Brian W. Aldiss
- Country: United Kingdom
- Language: English
- Genre: Science fiction
- Published: 1982; 1983; 1985
- Media type: Print

The Helliconia trilogy is a series of science fiction books by British writer Brian W. Aldiss, set on the Earth-like planet Helliconia. It is an epic chronicling the rise and fall of a civilisation over thousands of years as the planet progresses through its incredibly long seasons, which last for centuries.

On Helliconia, there are two main intelligent species: humans and phagors. The humans are similar to Earth humans, although they evolved independently. The phagors are white-furred humanoid beings, roughly the size of humans but with horned features resembling the mythical minotaur. They are intelligent, with their own language and culture, but their civilisation has never advanced beyond a hunter-gatherer level. Since the evolution of humans on the planet, the two species have been in constant conflict, with the phagors dominant during the great winter and the humans dominant during the great summer. Orbiting around the planet is a massive space station of Earth humans, the Avernus, and many probes and other monitoring devices, sending information about Helliconia to Earth.

The trilogy consists of the books Helliconia Spring (published in 1982), Helliconia Summer (1983), and Helliconia Winter (1985).

== Synopsis ==
As the books of the trilogy take place centuries apart and lack a central protagonist—instead giving time to many members in a cast of characters, such as the lineage of Yuli the Priest (Helliconia Spring) or the royal household of Borlien (Helliconia Summer) -- the true substance of the series is, in one sense, the planet itself and its science, especially in the light of James Lovelock's Gaia Hypothesis. Aldiss obtained help from many Oxford academics learned in many fields of study -- astronomy, geology, climatology, geobiology, microbiology, religion, society, etc. -- to draw connections that would show numerous ways in which various aspects of civilisation intersect and interact.

Helliconia experiences a very long year, called the "great year", equivalent to approximately 2,500 Earth years, and global temperatures vary greatly over this period. The books (which are set thousands of years in the future) each cover a different portion of one such "great year". A space station from Earth, the Avernus, is orbiting Helliconia and closely observing the planet, including the activities of its intelligent inhabitants. The temptation to interfere in Helliconian affairs is a recurring dilemma for the inhabitants of Avernus.

Helliconia is populated by two main races, humans and phagors, constantly competing for dominance of the planet. Helliconian humans are not the same species as Earth humans, having evolved entirely independently, but are remarkably similar in appearance, intellect, behaviour, and culture.

A major theme of the trilogy is the fragility of human civilisation in the context of environmental changes, and the ability of humanity to preserve and recreate civilisation. Nature frequently interrupts events occurring during the plot, and phenomena related to the changing of the seasons of the Great Year provide a deus ex machina plot device in the climax of each of the three books (the exploding trees toward the end of Spring that allow the heroes to escape a phagor attack, the migrating fish-lizards and sea monsters attempting to mate toward the end of Summer that allow the heroes in both cases to fend off invading armies, and the marauding phagors toward the end of Winter that allow the hero to escape from his captors).

== Earth ==
Since the present day, the humans of Earth have been through an era of space exploration. This has been rather disappointing, as faster than light travel was proven impossible, and few planets have been found bearing life beyond the microbial stage (though a minor sub-plot in Winter involves some space explorers finding a planet that contains little but the remains of a ruined civilization, an incident that leads them to posit there have existed several planets with many advanced civilizations, all ultimately having destroyed themselves via nuclear warfare). The one opportune success was the discovery of Helliconia, a planet presently full of adequately developed life. A space station, the Avernus, was dispatched to monitor but not interfere with Helliconia, providing the Earth with scientific data and the entertainment of an epic reality show aired planet-wide on a network of "eductainment".

Somewhat later, the human race destroys itself and most other life on Earth via nuclear warfare. Approximately one thousand years following this, Earth's Gaian repair mechanisms repopulate the world with new life, and allow the return of a small number of humans from other previously colonised planets (though they now wish to live simpler lives, having little interest in technological advancement).

=== Avernus ===
Colonisers departed Earth in the year 2100 AD, and were investigating the Ophiuchus supercluster in the 3100s AD when a planet appearing to bear life registered on observational satellites. This planet was Helliconia. In 3145 AD, a starship was dispatched to investigate, and arrived in the vicinity of star Batalix in 3600 AD. At first, the colonisers were able to land on the nearby planet of Aganip, and began construction of the massive space station Avernus, which was then operative in 3608 AD. Avernus is visible from the surface of Helliconia and appears to the inhabitants to be a bright, fast-moving star. Probes and other monitoring devices are installed on the planet, providing scientific readings and images which Avernus collects and transmits to Earth. As Helliconia and Earth are separated by one thousand light-years, the events occurring on Helliconia become viewable to humans on Earth long after they have actually happened.

Thousands of people live on Avernus split into a number of families, also called "clans" each studying a different facet of life on Helliconia. For example, the Pin family follows closely how a handful of families on Helliconia develop over the entirety of one Great Year while the Go family deals with questions of theology, philosophy, ontogeny and phylogeny.

Humans cannot survive long on Helliconia due to viruses and therefore any travel from Avernus to Helliconia is a one-way ticket. A Helliconia Holiday Lottery is held once every ten years during the Great Summer and is a source of entertainment to both the Avernians and the people of Earth. Avernians who go down to Helliconia do so knowing that they will die in a short time and with varying experiences.

The humans aboard the Avernus were intended to engage in their studies for at least two Great-Year cycles. However, after about four-thousand years of operation, the numbing isolation of being locked in a metal shell with little more than studying as the focus of life proves to be an ever-present source of despair for the Avernians. Although some eject themselves and attempt to set up a base on the nearby planet of Aganip, the rest of the Avernians are at last reduced to such base savagery, sexual debauchery (a common theme in Aldiss's works, which he treats with revulsion rather than salaciousness), and eudaemonistic madness that they bring about their own end. By the end of the trilogy, Avernus has stopped sending signals to Earth, and is nothing more than a lifeless shell with automated machinery left ceaselessly performing meaningless routine functions.

== Helliconia ==
=== Astronomy ===
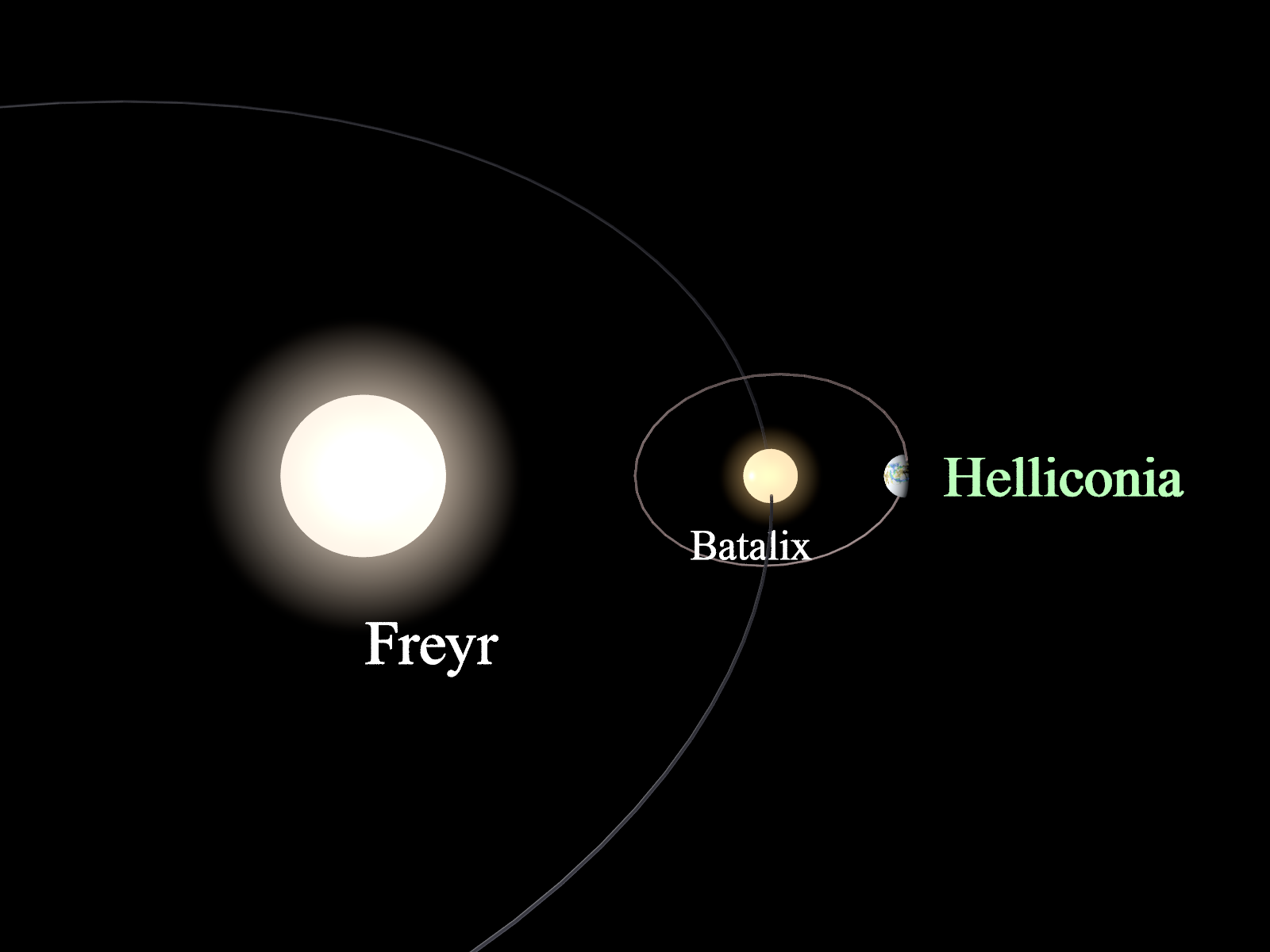
A depiction of Freyr, Helliconia and Batalix.

Helliconia lies in a loose binary star system, which consists of a yellow-orange dwarf similar to the Sun, Batalix (spectral class G4), and a hotter and brighter white star, Freyr (Type A supergiant). Helliconia orbits Batalix, which in turn orbits Freyr. The Freyr-Batalix star system supposedly appears near the constellation of Ophiuchus, about a thousand light years from Earth.

The length of a day on Helliconia is about 25 Earth hours, and Helliconia orbits Batalix in 480 days; this is called the "small year" (equal in length to 1.42 Earth years). The people of Helliconia divide each day of the small year into 25 hours, each of 40 minutes, which in turn are each divided into 100 seconds. Helliconia and Batalix's orbit around Freyr, the "great year", is highly elliptical and takes approximately 1,825 small years, equating to some 2,592 Earth years. At periastron Batalix is 236 astronomical units from Freyr, whilst at apastron is 710 AU distant. A Helliconian week is eight days. There are six weeks in a tenner, and ten tenners in a Helliconian small year. While seasonal changes in the small year are slighter than those of Earth, the long seasons of the great year are much more marked. When distant from Freyr, Batalix's illumination is sufficient only to maintain ice-age conditions. However, Freyr's output is many times greater than Batalix's, so as Helliconia approaches Freyr, the tropics of Helliconia become hotter even than the tropics of Earth.

Previously Helliconia only orbited Batalix, but the Helliconia-Batalix system was captured by Freyr's gravitational pull about eight million Earth-years ago (i.e., very recently by astronomical and evolutionary standards). The Freyr stellar system originally consisted of two stars, but during the encounter by Batalix, the sister-star of Freyr was thrown out of the system, along with one of Batalix's original planets and Helliconia's moon.

==== Other celestial bodies ====
Batalix has a total of 4 planets in orbit. They are, closet to farthest, Copaise (0.31 AU distant), Aganip (0.82 AU distant), Helliconia (1.26 AU distant), and Ipocrene (1.53 AU distant). To the inhabitants of Helliconia, the other planets appear in the sky to be bright stars, along with one other rapid-moving star called "Kaidaw" (actually the Earth Observation Station Avernus).

Copaise is the planet closest to Batalix. Next to nothing is known about it, but due to its proximity to Batalix, it is presumably a scorched, airless rock similar to Mercury. It is named after the lake Copaise in Beotia.

Aganip is the only other planet in the Batalix system besides Helliconia itself with at least some information known about it. When the colonization ship arrived in the Batalix system, it first landed on Aganip, building the Avernus space station throghout a period of eight years. Aganip is mentioned as a lifeless world with an atmosphere rich in carbon dioxide, essentially a somewhat hotter version of Mars, rich in minerals and unlike Helliconia, it is completely safe for the humans on Avernus due to a lack of the virus (or any life for that matter). It is named after the Aganippe stream on the Helicon mountain.

Ipocrene is the furthest planet in the Batalix system and actually the closest planet to Helliconia (the second novel mentions Aganip as the closest, but in reality it's Ipocrene, with a separation of 0.27 AU compared to Helliconia and Aganip's 0.44 AU separation). In the novel Helliconia Summer, Billy Xiao Pin explicitly mentions that Ipocrene is a gas giant. It is named after the Hippocrene stream.

Helliconia used to have a moon named T'Sehn-Hrr, which was lost when the Batalix system was captured by Freyr. Whether any of the other planets (Copaise, Aganip, Ipocrene) have any moons or whether they also lost them is never mentioned in the trilogy. Batalix also used to have a fifth planet orbiting outward of Ipocrene that was also lost during the Freyr capture of the system.

=== Geography ===
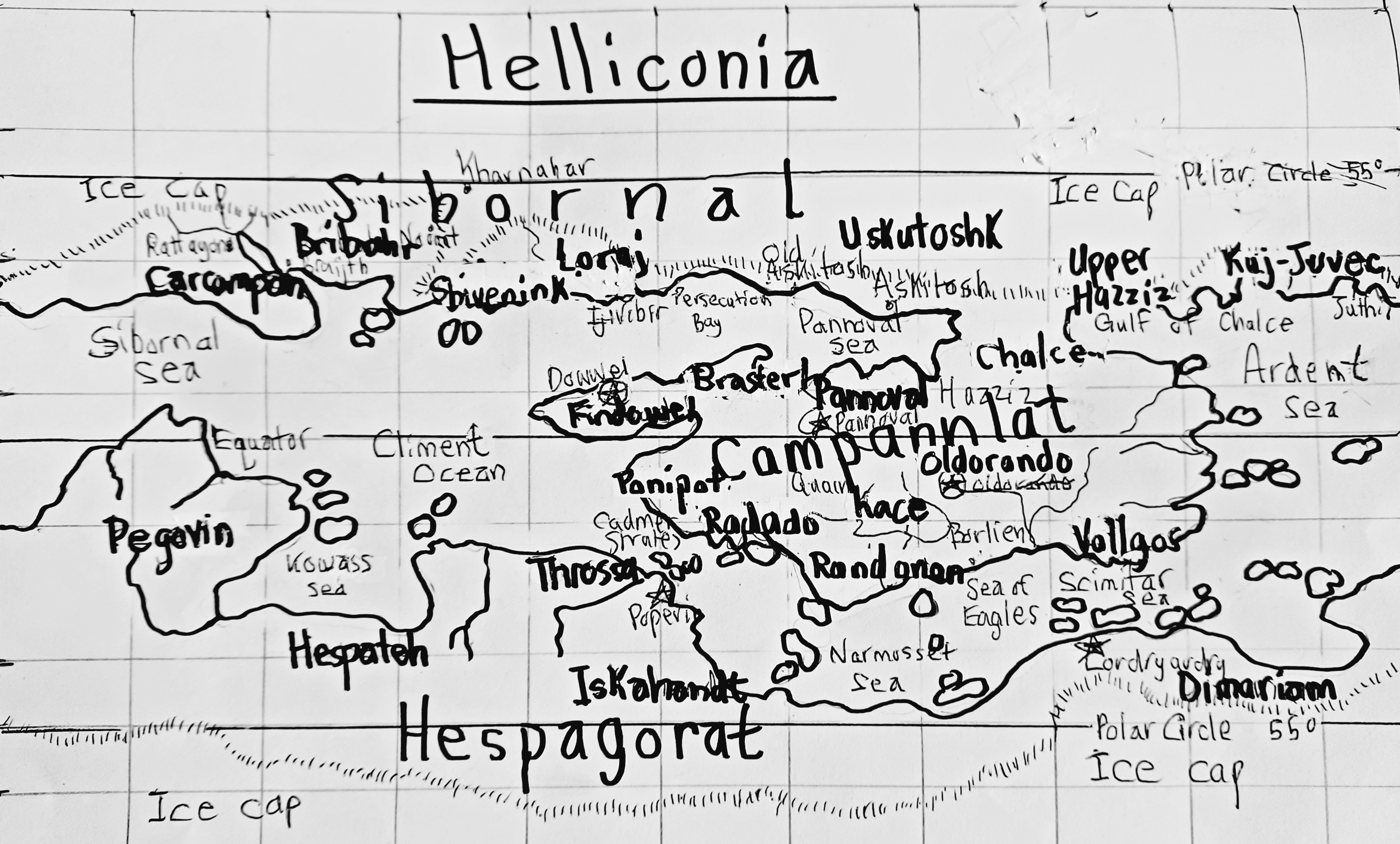
Map of Helliconia, a fictional Earth-like planet in Brian Aldiss' Helliconia science fiction trilogy.

Helliconia is 1.28 times the mass of Earth with a greater axial tilt of 35 degrees. The small-year seasons are harsher, but the planet still has huge polar ice caps, capable of surviving even the great summer, and the human-habitable surface area is comparable to that of Earth.

There are three continents: a central continent (Campannlat), a northern continent (Sibornal) and a southern continent (Hespagorat). Helliconia Spring and Helliconia Summer mainly take place in Campannlat, with its tropical climate and rich vitality; Helliconia Winter focuses more on the polar regions of Sibornal, where the harsher environment encourages technological progress. The southern continent, Hespagorat, another polar region, features only briefly in the books, when an ice company's ship captain sails to Lordryardry to harvest huge blocks of ice to sell in Campannlat.

=== Language ===
Aldiss has written the trilogy in the English language, but readers are made to understand that the Helliconians are indeed speaking their own language(s). That humans on Helliconia have evolved totally separate from humans on Earth supports this. A few languages are described throughout the trilogy, including the following:

==== Olonets ====
The primary language of humans (especially on the continent of Campannlat). The name of the language is ancient, and refers to when humans had recently evolved to their present hominid form on Helliconia, as they had been split into the "Ten Tribes," or "Olle Onets." In truth, Olonets is but a greatly modified version of Native Ancipital, and the Olonets name for the planet, "Helliconia," is a modified version of the original Ancipital name for the planet, "Hrl-Ichor Yhar."

Olonets is, during the events of the books, further divided into two main classes: Pure Olonets and Local Olonets. Pure Olonets is used mainly by nobility and religious leaders, while Local Olonets is used by the general population.

Though humans are the chief speakers of the Olonets language, other species are able to gain some proficiency with it. Some phagors (especially those who are kept captive or otherwise made to spend greater amounts of time around humans) are able to speak it—though with some difficulty, as they struggle to understand differences of tense and their cattle-like mouths give them marked trouble pronouncing sibilant sounds. Even some of the human-like Madis (especially those with some more recent human ancestry due to cross-species breeding) have proven themselves capable of handling Olonets, though they may still be prone to singing it rather than speaking it.

==== Sibish ====
Another language spoken by humans (especially on the continent of Sibornal). It has its own distinct written script, and boasts multiple tenses and conditionals, such as the continuous present, the conditional-eternal, the past-into-present, the transferential, the subjunctive, the past continuous, the future compulsive, the avoidance-subjunctive, the fatalistic future, and others still that are combinations of the aforesaid.

In Winter, the Sibish phrase "Abro Hakmo Astab!" is a known phrase of defiance, as it is understood to describe the action of defiling the planet's suns (Freyr and Batalix) performing irrumation on both of them.

==== Ancipital ====
The primary language of phagors. The native ancipital language is unsuited for abstract thought, and deals with only one tense: the continuous present. An auxiliary mode of ancipital, called Eo-Temporal, is a sacred mode of speech phagors use as the language of the trance-state "tether" (the phagor equivalent to the human trance-state "pauk"). The name of Helliconia's former moon in Native Ancipital is "T'Sehn-Hrr."

The table below shows some words/phrases in Native Ancipital, with the approximate Olonets equivalents (set here in English):

Native Ancipital	Olonets
Hrrm-Bhhrd Ydohk	Embruddock
Hrl-Drra Nhdo	Oldorando
Hrl-Ichor Yhar	Helliconia
T'Sehn-Hrr / Tennhrr	Tenner
Bhrl-Hzzh Rowpin	BillishOwpin

==== Hurdhu ====
A bridge language between humans and phagors. The language is also referred to as an intraspecific mode of communication, a genuine bridge between human and non-human concepts, and is said to have originated from the continent of Sibornal. This tongue is purportedly heavy with nouns and gerunds, and many of its sounds emanate from the back of the throat.

The table below shows some words/phrases as understood in Olonets and Native Ancipital, with the Hurdhu equivalents (set here in English):

Olonets/Native Ancipital	Hurdhu
Humanity	Sons of Freyr
Civilisation	Many of roofs
Military Formation	Spears on move by orders
Discussion	Sayance
Departure	Goance

==== hr'Madi'h ====
The primary language of the Madis, a species of nomadic semi-humans constantly migrating across the continent of Campannlat. The language is also referred to as a proto-gnostic language. It is not a rigid sort of language, being more fluid and thus more suitable for singing than for speaking. There is no written form of the Madi language, and words or phrases may more accurately describe concepts rather than fixed ideas. In Summer, the Madi word "Ahd" can refer to a "life," a "journey," or another collection of events (as, for the Madis, their journey is their life).

The table below shows some words/phrases in the Madi language, with the approximate Olonets translation (set here in English):

Madi	Olonets Translation
Ahd	life, the journey
uct	the avenues seeded by migratory passage
la'hrap	flat unleavened bread
fhlebiht	arang, a grazing animal of the flock

==== Language change over time ====
As a feature of his invented world, Aldiss has given the readers examples of language change, by which some words and names persist with alterations over time. Helliconian languages exhibit such alterations over the course of a Great Year. Courtesy of written records that manage to survive, some characters are still remembered many years after they are gone.

The table below shows examples of how some words and names are reckoned at different points in the trilogy:

Spring	Summer
Aoz Roon Den	AozroOnden
Loil Bry Den	Loylbryden
Vry Den	VryDen
Raynil Layan	RayniLayan / RayNilayan
Ottaassaal	Ottassol
Ponpt	Ponipot
Boulder	Beholder

=== Technology ===
Different individuals and groups exist at different stages of Helliconia's Great Year, each hoping in some way to preserve knowledge. Some of these are reduced to folklore, others have their efforts ruined, while others still manage to persist more efficiently.

==== Masters Corps ====
At the time of Spring, various guilds or "masters corps" exist, each dedicated to the perpetuation of certain profession and crafts. The masters corps were founded by King Denniss, who ruled before the end of the previous Great Year. Generally, only men are permitted membership (though during Spring, the apothecary's corps allows one woman, a skilled herbalist, to join). Revealing secrets of the corps is punishable by death.

At the beginning of Spring, there are seven old corps of Embruddock, only five of which are made known. They are:

1. Metal-makers corps
2. Colour-makers corps
3. Brewers corps
4. Tawyers and tanners corps
5. Apothecary’s corps

During the course of the story of Spring, two new corps of Embruddock are created. They are:

1. Harness and lorimers corps
2. Outfitters corps

Due to the durable goods and technology that still exists here and there in Embruddock, such as towers and telescopes, some characters of Spring come to suspect that other corps once existed. They would have been:

1. Mason-makers corps
2. Paper-makers corps
3. Glass-makers corps

=== Biology ===
Although Helliconia appears to share many organisms in kind with Earth, the trilogy describes a variety of exclusive plants and animals, and how they cope with the extremes of the climate. A memorable example is Wutra's Worm, an immense creature whose life span matches the great year, the Helliconian equivalent of a dragon. As spring unfolds the young worms emerge from underground and sprout wings to take flight, in the summer the adolescent worms are sea-dwellers, and in the winter the now-wingless mature worms return to a life below the surface in a great network of tunnels.

==== Flora ====
Several kinds of plant life are described across the changing seasons, and the humans of Helliconia find various uses for them.

In Spring, some newly emerged plants find applications as herbal remedies, especially at around the time of the Bone Fever epidemic, when flowers are used as a sort of nostrum to sterilise the nasal passages and ward off "bad airs."

In Summer, when temperatures are stifling, some plants are used decoratively (Scantiom—hung for its appearance and cooling balm), recreationally (Veronikane—set alight in a way similar to tobacco), or even for nourishment (Pellamountain—infused in water to prepare a kind of tea).

==== Fauna ====
Some of the animals in the trilogy have the same name as Earth animals, although Aldiss does not state these are identical to their Earth equivalent. There is also a variety of imagined creatures.

=== Phagors ===
Phagors, also called ancipitals (meaning "double-edged", in reference to their horns), "shaggies," and "fuggies," are white-furred humanoid beings, roughly the size of humans but with features resembling the mythical minotaur. They are intelligent, with their own language and culture, but their civilisation has never advanced beyond a hunter-gatherer level. Having evolved during Helliconia's earlier cold period, phagors are very different from humans in many ways: their blood is golden rather than red, their guts are located above their lungs, their brains are uni-hemispheric, and they have an utterly alien intellect and psychology. They are described as hardy and long-lived, though not tolerant of warm conditions and water. If a phagor reaches great age, it begins to shrink and gradually becomes keratinised, so that it eventually resembles a small totem showing no outward signs of life. Living phagors continue to be able to communicate with the spirits of these keratinised ancestors by assuming a mental state called tether. When in tether, they perceive their ancestors as small quadrupedal sprites. These sprites, as ancestral spirits able to be contacted, fulfil the same role as the human "gossies" and "fessups".

Since the capture of the Helliconia system by the star Freyr and the subsequent evolution of humans, the two species have been in constant conflict, with the phagors dominant during the great winter and the humans dominant during the great summer. The slow swings in fortune between the two species are governed by the planet's climatic and biological cycles, rendering military conflicts between them essentially irrelevant. In a reversal of their original relationship, phagors are sometimes employed as soldiers or kept as slaves by humans, and humans are sometimes kept as slaves by phagors, during both seasons. When humans have phagors as slaves or pets, they may have their horns removed.

=== Humans ===
Phagors were the dominant race on Helliconia before Batalix and the planets in orbit about it were captured by Freyr. The increased temperatures and UV-radiation caused by the new stellar configuration encouraged the evolution of humans on Helliconia. Before this, the ancestors of humans had been ape-like creatures from the continent of Hespagorat (once joined to the continent of Campannlat by a land bridge), sometimes kept as pets by the phagors. Because humans emerged after the solar system's capture by Freyr, the phagors associate them with the new star, and thus call them "Sons of Freyr". Remnants of human evolution can be seen in the continued existence of several sub-human and semi-human species on Helliconia. The humans of Helliconia and those of Earth are therefore unrelated despite their apparent near-identity, products of convergent evolution.

By the end of each great autumn, humans have developed levels of civilization comparable at their most advanced to Renaissance Europe, with technology such as telescopes, map-making, porcelain and glass-crafting, and even gas-lamps. However, each time the centuries-long great winter (also called the "Weyr-Winter") returns, human civilization inevitably regresses and has to be rebuilt again the next spring.

“So greatly had time dismantled a once proud city that its inhabitants did not realise that what they regarded as a town was nothing more than the remains of a palace, which had stood in the middle of a civilisation obliterated by climate, madness, and the ages.” (Helliconia Spring, Chapter VIII)

The books hint that humans in some regions are becoming more competent at preserving knowledge and social structures through the winter, and that over the next few great years they may develop a scientific-industrial civilization capable of surviving throughout the great year, and thus completely dominating Helliconia.

=== Semi-humans ===
Several species similar to humans have evolved on Helliconia, and exist contemporaneously with the dominant species of human we follow across the trilogy.

==== Madis ====
A nomadic species that experiences life as passage of distance, rather than a passage of time. Madis are similar to humans, but more slender and of smaller stature, possessing a consciousness described as not-quite-human; they have dark skin, faces described as somewhat bird-like, excellent eyesight, and zygodactylous fingers and toes (four opposing four on the hands, giving them extraordinary grips; four facing forward and four at the heels on the feet, giving them an especial nimbleness).

Madis communicate by singing their language, and generally mate for life. When two of them are joined in what they recognise as a form of marriage, they merge their names (ex: the name of a married pair may be "The Cathkaarnits," the male called "Cathkaarnit-he," and the female "Cathkaarnit-she"). Some Madis have been known to associate and cross-breed with humans, though the humans are usually the ones to initiate such relationships, as the Madis generally care only for their nomadic journey.

==== Nondads ====
A subterranean species known to inhabit Campannlat. Pockets of these semi-humans live underground in a vast network of caves and tunnels known as “The Eighty Darknesses,” entering and exiting via burrows at the bases of rajabaral trees.

Nondads are described as similar to Madis, possessing eight-fingered hands and standing no higher than the average human’s waist, but their bodies are much hairier and their faces more dog-like, with protruding muzzles. They are mostly peaceful, having designated a special ruler/warrior class of select males permitted to act on violent impulse. A female may hold a role as a comforter or healer, known as a “snoktruix.”

They communicate constantly — even while eating — through a mix of snorts, whistles, and clicks.

Most Nondads appear to strive towards uniting all members of the tribe in a sort of collective consciousness, many acting in the same way and communicating the same thing at the same time. This is done supposedly in accordance with the will of their god, Withram, whom they believe to oppose individuality.

Unlike humans, Nondads have had no prior exposure to the helico virus. In Spring, a group of Nondads that has ventured to the surface abducts a weakened Laintal Ay (at the time ill with Bone Fever) and brings him underground to look after him, unwittingly exposing the entire tribe to the helico virus and causing mass death.

==== Ondods ====
A species similar to Nondads, but inhabiting Sibornal. The word "Ondod" supposedly means "Spirit People" or "Spirited People," as Luterin Shokerandit understands in Winter.

Intimate relationships appear to rely heavily on insults, with males and females constantly slandering each other (even in the presence of strangers) but still showing some genuine affection at times.

They have their own language, but are also able to communicate with humans by using a broken Sibish. The table below shows some words/phrases in the Ondod language, with some rough Sibish translations (set here in English):

Ondod	Sibish Translation
Ishto	Understood / Affirmative
Gumtaa	Good / Agreeable
Loobiss	Excellent / Superior
Kakool	Trouble / Betrayal
Smrtaa	Revenge / Retribution

==== "Others" ====
Some species of semi-humans are described, but not in great detail, being referred to simply as "Others." From descriptions of their dark fur and white faces, habitation among trees, and swinging from different structures using their hands, feet, and tails, it can be presumed that Others are similar to monkeys, though ape-like tailless species exist, and a species of "gorilloid" Others is also mentioned.

=== Virology ===
==== The Helico Virus ====
On Helliconia, a virus carried by ticks is both a harbinger of death and a natural safeguard against total human extinction. Endemic twice in a great year, it causes widespread devastation and transformation to the Helliconian humans toward the beginning of the great spring and toward the end of the great autumn. The virus, while essential for human survival on Helliconia, is fatal year-round to the humans aboard the Earth Observation Station Avernus, who have no natural defenses against it. Nonetheless, many inhabitants of Avernus choose to enter a lottery in which they can win the chance to visit the planet's surface and interact with the population, knowing that the virus will kill them within a matter of days. Notably, phagors carry the virus, but are immune to its deadlier aspects with which the ticks afflict the humans.

===== Symptoms of the Helico Virus =====
Though fictional, the helico virus appears to be an amalgamation of different real-world illnesses, displaying features of Mumps (viral structure and bodily rashes), Meningitis (cerebral inflammation and sensory disruptions), and Tetanus (muscular spasms and locked limbs).

“Their lips were blue, peeled back to reveal yellow teeth and gums. Their limbs were distorted, their bones creaked. They were in some way aware of their position, yet unable to cease a constant motor movement, making their eyeballs roll horribly in their stretched facial skin.” (Helliconia Spring, Chapter XIII)

===== Helico Virus in Spring: Bone Fever =====
As the planet warms during the onset of the great spring, the virus rages in the form of Bone Fever. Populations across the globe can expect to be reduced by about half. At this phase, the main feature of the virus is the immediate onset of an acute form of anorexia. Humans afflicted experience revulsion at the thought of eating, starving themselves and shedding about one-third to one-half of their normal body weight. Survivors achieve thinner bodily frames and altered metabolisms to prepare future human generations for centuries of warmer weather.

===== Helico Virus in Autumn: Fat Death =====
As the planet cools during the end of the great autumn, the virus rages in the form of Fat Death. Populations across the globe can expect to be reduced by about half. At this phase, the main feature of the virus is the immediate onset of an acute form of bulimia. Humans afflicted experience unquenchable appetites, eating just about anything they can—food, feces, even their own children—and gaining about one-third to one-half of their normal body weight. Survivors achieve heavier bodily frames and altered metabolisms to prepare future human generations for centuries of colder weather.

===== Other notes =====
Bone Fever and Fat Death cause great suffering and have very high mortality rates. However, survivors (and therefore, their progeny) are left with bodies much thinner or fatter and, metabolically speaking, better adapted to the coming conditions of summer or winter, respectively. Hence, humans have a symbiotic relationship with the virus and – unknowingly – with the phagors, who carry the ticks and therefore the virus. Some rare people in remote areas happen to be immune to the virus; these are considered ugly pariahs by the majority of the population, as they are horribly fat or thin compared to the prevailing standard.

Outside of the hyperactive periods of the plagues at spring's onset and autumn's end, bites from phagor ticks may also cause the virus to manifest in a less active form, causing intense hallucinatory fevers and blotchy rashes over one's entire body; these symptoms persist for about a week, but ultimately fail to produce the permanent metabolic changes characteristic of a true Bone Fever or Fat Death. In Spring, Aoz Roon wrestles with a live phagor and Laintal Ay wears the skin of a slain phagor in an attempt to disguise himself as one—both men fall ill of the helico virus in its "lesser" form.

=== Religion & spirituality ===
==== Akhanaba ====
Akhanaba, also referred to as "Akha's Naba," "Naba's Akha," or simply "Akha," is a chthonic deity (said to resemble a human in Spring, and a phagor in Summer) worshipped as a god of the earth and darkness by some of the humans on Helliconia. Followers of Akha may construct various shrines and idols from dug earth or stone—generally not permitted to be exposed to sunlight—and make public displays of obedience, as well as offerings of food and money that are ultimately directed to the priesthood. It is believed that Akha must remain engaged in an everlasting war with his counterpart, Wutra. Hence, human affairs are considered unimportant to Akha.

In the prelude of Spring, a young Yuli in Pannoval elects to be a priest of Akha. At this time, a street-preacher named "Naab" begins to advocate for reform among the people, so that they may become worthy of the god Akha's care. But as soon as Naab suggests that reform is also necessary among the ranks of the priesthood, he is arrested and later ritualistically executed. Even so, rumours of his preachings persist, then over many years his name is modified to be "Naba," and he is elevated from the status of preacher to prophet, sparking revitalization among a lesser known sect of the priesthood, called the Takers. In this way, the name of the god transitions over time from "Akha" to "Akhanaba." Later, when Yuli forms his new settlement of Oldorando, he permits no mention of Akha, having become disillusioned with the god and the corresponding priesthood.

In Summer, the god Akhanaba is still worshipped, yet to an even greater extent across Campannlat, for Pannoval has over centuries become the head of a theocratic empire.

==== Wutra ====
Wutra is a celestial deity (said to resemble a phagor in Spring) worshipped as a god of the skies and light by some of the humans on Helliconia.

In Spring, a woman named Shay Tal learns from the gossies and fessups of the underworld that Wutra as god does not truly exist. Rather, “Wutra” is but the name human slaves gave long ago to their phagor masters. What the word/name "Wutra" means is not clear, but it seems to denote the submission and dread humans experience at the hands of phagors during times of extreme cold.

“…and Wutra what of him he did not aid our distant fessups when they lived. In the days of the old iron cold came the white phagors out of the murk and took the town by storm making the humans their slaves who worshipped their new masters by the name Wutra because the gods of ice winds ruled…” (Helliconia Spring, Chapter VIII)

==== God the Azoiaxic & The Great Wheel of Kharnabhar ====
Humans of the northern continent Sibornal worship the god they call by the moniker Azoiaxic, intended to describe a being which has always existed, and forever revolves about, constantly encouraging and encapsulating life. The Sibornalese have developed the Church of Formidable Peace for worship of God the Azoiaxic.

The Great Wheel of Kharnabhar was constructed and dedicated to this god. Monks who worship God the Azoiaxic staff the wheel. Many people believe in its sanctity and make pilgrimages to the site of the Great Wheel. The Sibornalese believe that the act of turning the wheel is akin to turning a cog that propels Helliconia vessel-like across the heavens and toward the warmth of the star Freyr.

==== Magic ====
Some humans on Helliconia are willing to accept the possible existence of magic and/or sorcery, though examples of it in the story are explainable by science. Some timekeeping systems are regarded as sinister and associated with witchcraft and the occult. There is supposedly an older form of the Olonets language used for channeling magic.

In Spring, a woman named Shay Tal gains a reputation as a sorceress after appearing to produce ice from a pool of water, freezing a band of phagors. Unknown to her, this occurred because the phagors had disturbed still supercooled water; she later makes attempts to reproduce and determine the extent of her supposed magic, though each attempt fails.

In Summer, a man named Billy Xiao Pin (from the Earth Observation Station Avernus) brings a wristwatch-like timekeeping device to Helliconia. Humans on the planet have knowledge of calendars and timekeeping, and can make clocks, but believe that the device is a magic artifact, as they are unable to explain its electronic interface and other functionings. Even phagors are wary about doing anything with Billy's watch, as they observe that it can perform tasks by unknown means and seems to hold unspecified powers.

==== The Original Boulder/Beholder ====
Just as Earth in the novels is sustained by Gaia, the Earth-mother force, Helliconia is tended by a similar yet separate entity referred to as the "Original Beholder" (or in Helliconia Spring the "Original Boulder"), often represented in artwork as a benevolent female figure, a maternal force watching over the world. A striking difference between Earth-humans and Helliconian humans (and phagors) is the latter's ability to communicate with the spirits of the dead as their life force is slowly returned to the Original Beholder. Both humans and phagors can enter a sort of shamanistic trance allowing this direct communication, a state which the humans call pauk (also "father-communing" or "paterplacation"), and the phagors call tether. Recently deceased human spirits are called "gossies"; those of more ancient demise are "fessups."

A plot point in the trilogy is the changing character of the pauk experience for the Helliconian humans:

In Spring, the spirits of the dead are described as exceedingly bitter and scathing. They feel they were cheated out of better things in life, and direct all despair for their current condition at the living.

After humans on Earth become interested in Helliconian civilization (at about the time of Spring), a planet-wide effort is made on Earth to transmit psychically an amount of empathic energy from Gaia to the Original Beholder, in order to lend support to the humans on Helliconia. This effort has a positive effect on the spirits of the dead Helliconians, making them happier and more nurturing toward the living.

So, at about the time of Summer, the spirits of the dead are described as excessively sweet and consoling. They offer solace toward the living and heap forgiveness upon them, no matter how their previous lives may have turned out. And many years later in Winter, the spirits of the dead are described as having reached a more neutral emotional state. They are more at ease and cooperative, usually willing to give explanations and advice to the living.

===== Land-Octaves =====
Land-Octaves are described as invisible paths of the planet, similar to veins in a body. Stone pillars set around the planet mark the known locations of local land-octaves. Humans believe that the powers of land-octaves vary by season, and can even control the sex of babies born along them. Scholars on Helliconia note that land-octaves appear to follow geological strata and mineral deposits, thus influencing health. Supposedly, humans on Helliconia are happiest and most fulfilled when they conform to whichever land-octave they were born on, and it is considered proper practice to bury the dead along their correct land-octaves.

===== Air-Octaves =====
Air-Octaves are described as invisible paths of the planet, similar to ribbons set afloat in the wind. Ancipitals are known to refer to air-octaves as either "favourable" or "unfavourable," obeying and following "favourable" ones and refusing to venture near or take action involving "unfavourable" ones. Even Madis seem sensitive to the presence of air-octaves. Ancipitals believe that air-octaves make a sort of song, and while in tether, they can be "seen" as strings running through the cosmos and along which celestial bodies travel.

== Calendrical Timekeeping ==
The table below includes certain dates from the books that delineate a reckoning of the passage of time between Helliconia and Earth.

TIMETABLE
1: Avernus (EY)	2: Earth (AD)	3: Helliconia (EYAA)	4: Helliconia (HYAA)	5: Events
-1508	2100	1584	1115	Colonizing starships leave Earth
-500	3108	0	0	Apastron
-463	3145	37	26	Colonizing starship investigating Ophiuchus supercluster is dispatched to investigate planet Helliconia
-8	3600	492	346	Colonizing starship enters Freyr-Batalix system, establishes base on Aganip
0	3608	500	352	Avernus becomes operational
1293	4901	1793	1262	Nuclear war ruins inhabited planets of Solar system, causes nuclear winter on Earth
1738	5346	2238	1576	Year 249 before Nadir, corps system established by legendary King Denniss
2092	5700	0	0	Apastron
2292	5900	200	141	New ice age recedes, life emerges again on Earth
2592	6200	500	352	Avernus has been operational for the equivalent of one Great Year
2726	6334	634	446	Book 1 ends
3269	6877	1177	828	Book 2 ends
3965	7573	1873	1319	Book 3 ends

Column 1 displays the number of years Avernus has been operational. This is measured in Earth years (EY).

Column 2 displays the current year on Earth, by measure of the Gregorian Calendar ("Anno Domini," AD).

Column 3 displays the current year on Helliconia, as reckoned by Earth Years After Apastron (EYAA). This figure goes up to 2592, the number of small years in a Great Year (by Earth time standard), then resets to 0.

Column 4 displays the current year on Helliconia, as reckoned by Helliconian Years After Apastron (HYAA). This figure goes up to 1825, the number of small years in a Great Year (by Helliconia time standard), then resets to 0.

Column 5 displays important events occurring at the time noted.

== Plot summaries ==
=== Helliconia Spring ===
Helliconia Spring is set in the central region of the tropical continent, Campannlat. It is divided into two parts. The "prelude", entitled Yuli, is set during the end of the Great Winter and follows the story of one man from youth into adulthood; this takes up about a quarter of the book. The remainder of the story, Embruddock, spans nearly 30 Helliconian years (about 40 Earth years) and documents the coming of the Great Spring. This narrative traces the intertwined lives of many people and the changes in their society as the climate warms, setting these events within the overarching framework of the planet's natural cycles.

==== Prelude: Yuli ====
The prelude takes place about a century before the end of the Great Winter. While on a hunting expedition, a youth named Yuli and his father are ambushed by phagors. His father is taken as a slave, and Yuli kills a phagor and flees south in search of food and shelter. He makes his way to Pannoval, a city built within a vast cavern system. Pannoval is ruled despotically by an alliance of the priesthood and militia, who keep the citizens oppressed in the name of the god Akha. Yuli is converted to the religion of Akha and is initiated into the priesthood, which involves years of work and study as an acolyte.

As a newly ordained priest, he is sent to work with imprisoned criminals, who are used as slaves to excavate new living areas for the city until they are either executed or worked to death. His main task is to conduct interrogations and extract confessions from the prisoners. Yuli comes to realise just how corrupt the ruling class of Pannoval is, loses his faith, and becomes determined to return to the outside world. He seizes his chance when the prisoners' excavation work causes a cave-in. In the confusion, he escapes along with two prisoners and the former girlfriend of one of them. After a long and terrifying journey through underground passages, they finally emerge some distance to the south.

Yuli and his companions find a small, primitive settlement near a frozen lake, and soon come to rule it thanks to their superior knowledge and bold authority. Soon afterwards they extend their rule to a neighbouring tribe. Yuli spends the rest of his life as a revered priest-ruler in this area, which he names Oldorando.

==== Embruddock ====
Yuli's tribe continues to live in the area near the lake for two generations until, having been warned of an impending phagor raid, the entire tribe flees south. To their amazement, they discover a relatively advanced town called Embruddock, the remnant of what had been the capital of an empire during the previous Great Summer (although this history is long forgotten). This place has the advantage of being situated in a geothermally active area, which has provided just enough warmth throughout the Great Winter that Embruddock has retained some fragments of its former culture (mainly in the skills and records of the craftsmens' guilds and in the stone towers).

Yuli's tribe attacks Embruddock and takes it over, renaming it Oldorando, and Yuli's family line is established as the local lords. A few years after this event, the town is attacked by a company of phagors. The phagor captain, a noble of his kind, is captured and executed. Some thirteen years (about nineteen Earth years) after that, the grandson of the phagor captain assembles a huge army which begins marching on Oldorando intent on revenge, a journey which will take a further thirteen years.

About ten years after the execution of the phagor captain, the Great Spring has begun and Helliconia has warmed enough that changes are beginning to be noticeable. Waterways are thawing, plants sprout in sheltered areas, and the weather becomes damp and unpredictable. Master hunter Aoz Roon, an Embruddock native, secretly murders the Oldorandan rulers and becomes the new lord of the city. Laintal Ay, the last of the Oldorandan lineage, witnesses the murders but keeps quiet out of fear; he becomes one of Aoz Roon's lieutenants.

A strong-minded woman named Shay Tal argues for increased rights for women. She also begins to realise that the population is slowly recovering from some ancient catastrophe. She exhorts the people to seek knowledge and sets up an academy, originally for women only. Aoz Roon, a callous and unimaginative man, opposes this, only begrudgingly accepting it as Shay Tal unintentionally gains a reputation as a powerful sorceress. Guildmaster Datnil Skar, defying the guild laws of secrecy, reveals to Shay Tal that the guilds have kept records for centuries, although many books have been destroyed. These records reveal that the climate was once much colder, and hint at a warm period even longer ago, a tale widely regarded as myth.

Shay Tal, becoming obsessed with humanity's past, realises that vast amounts of knowledge have been lost over countless generations. As she continues her research into the history of Embruddock, and after communing with the souls of the dead, she learns that during the hardest depths of the Great Winter, phagors ruled the area and enslaved humanity. Shay Tal reviews some ancient murals and realises something about the depictions of mythology... the foreboding, simian Freyr; the calm, bovine Batalix; and the compassionate Wutra—yes, that humans indeed came to worship their oppressors—the icon of their god Wutra is nothing but the distorted image of a phagor.

Shay Tal's main disciple, a woman named Vry, disagrees with this obsession with history and urges the academy to study the movements of the stars and think more about the future than the past. She and other students begin mapping the sky and determining the movements of the heavenly bodies. They calculate that the two suns, Batalix and Freyr, will soon begin a series of eclipses, an event noted in old records as an evil omen.

Helliconia continues to grow warmer. New plant and animal species are appearing, human populations are growing and spreading, and phagor populations are retreating to colder regions – except for the great phagor army which continues its march towards Oldorando. The population of the city continues to increase. As the town grows crops and domesticates animals, the work of survival becomes easier, the people begin to take an interest in leisure and luxury, and the town's defences grow weak. The first eclipse occurs, indicating the astronomical beginning of the Great Spring and causing widespread panic. The people of Oldorando learn to domesticate and breed hoxneys, horse-like animals which have emerged with the coming of the Great Spring. The ability to ride hoxneys and use them to power simple machinery triggers a great societal revolution, and Oldorando expands rapidly. As the climate improves and people begin to travel more widely, the city's location makes it an attractive hub, and it develops into a trading centre.

Observers from Earth, orbiting Helliconia in the space station Avernus, watch the coming of the Great Spring with interest. Among other phenomena, they follow the spread of the viral disease called bone fever, which inevitably strikes the human population at about the time of the spring eclipses, spread by the bite of phagor ticks. Although the disease causes severe suffering and death across the planet, it is necessary for the human species, because it causes its survivors to become adapted to the new warmer climate.

Oldorando has now grown into a wealthy, bustling bazaar city, attracting traders and travellers from far across the continent. Its old culture, dating from the Great Winter and simple tribal survival, is no longer suitable for this new, more sophisticated society. Political stresses become evident as the city is forced to adopt new customs such as the use of money. Shay Tal leaves to seek a "great wheel" in the northern continent of Sibornal, which she believes holds supreme knowledge. Aoz Roon escorts her out of Oldorandan territory (during their final interaction, it is hinted that the two may have had some affection for each other in their younger years), and on the way back is ambushed by phagors. While he fights one of the phagors hand-to-hand, they are swept into a flooded river and stranded together on an island. There he contracts bone fever.

Meanwhile, the bone fever epidemic has reached Oldorando, brought by incoming traders. Aoz Roon remains absent for many months, and two of his lieutenants try to seize power. Between the political wrangling and the terrors of the epidemic, Oldorandan society begins to fall apart. Laintal Ay leaves, ostensibly to search for Aoz Roon but actually because he can no longer stand life in the corrupt city. He makes his way north and encounters a town, New Ashkitosh, settled by people who have migrated southward from icy Sibornal. They have learned to coexist with phagors by trading captive slaves in return for safe passage.

Laintal Ay, who by this time has contracted and survived bone fever, is accepted into the town and given work overseeing the prisoner-slaves. He discovers that Shay Tal was previously captured and sold on, and then learns of the massive phagor army, which by now is almost upon them. He arranges with a disaffected Sibornalan guard to flee the town and return to Oldorando, hoping to get there in time to warn them of the phagor horde. Just as they prepare to leave, a weakened Aoz Roon is brought into the city as a captive; he joins the escaping group. Approaching Oldorando, they meet a handful of refugees fleeing for their lives. As the suns rise in a day-long eclipse, the phagor army attacks Oldorando and burns the city to the ground.

=== Helliconia Summer ===
Set during high summer in the tropical continent, Campannlat. Yuli's settlement, Oldorando, is now the capital city of a great empire. Meanwhile, the residents of the space station Avernus are holding occasional lotteries to ameliorate their ennui, the winners being allowed to go down to Helliconia and experience a few short weeks of "real life" before succumbing to the Helliconian microbes (against which Earth humans have no immunity). Despite the fatal consequences, the chance to visit the planet's surface and interact with its people is considered a great honor, and the lottery is popular. One such winner, Billy Xiao Pin (who becomes known to a few of the Helliconians as "BillishOwpin"), gets involved in high politics, and a piece of advanced technology he leaves behind results in some confusion for the Helliconians. The city of Pannoval from Spring is now the capital of a continent-spanning theocratic empire, still worshipping the god Akhanaba but now exerting religious influence on all other city-states of Campannlat. This novel focuses on the previously mentioned Campannlatian seaside settlement of Borlien, which has also grown into a powerful kingdom ruled by King JandolAnganol, who now agrees to divorce his beautiful wife, Queen MyrdemInggala, so he can wed the rather young Oldorandan princess Simoda Tal and secure a more favorable political alliance, as the nations of the planet's different continents have fallen into warfare.

Whereas Spring covered multiple generations in relatively few parts of the world, Summer takes the opposite approach, and covers many areas of the world as various story threads interact with each other—all within a relatively short period of time. To that end, the novel follows several "point-of-view" characters, whose plotlines are herein described.

==== King JandolAnganol ====
King JandolAnganol of Borlien, in a political manoeuvre, divorces his wife to seek a more beneficial marriage with the princess of neighbouring Oldorando. In a flash-back, it is revealed that JandolAnganol was encouraged to do this following a disastrous loss against barbarous tribesmen who have somehow obtained firearms. Now the king means to get those same firearms, and in a series of impulsive actions resulting from conflicting advisements, dismisses his chancellor and remains resolved to forge a dynastic marriage with the princess Simoda Tal of the House of Oldorando. However, the very night after he has divorced his queen, King JandolAnganol learns that his newly betrothed Simoda Tal has just been murdered.

At the end of the novel, the king has married Simoda Tal's sister, Milua Tal, and watches on as Phagors once again burn the city of Oldorando.

==== Queen MyrdemInggala ====
Queen MyrdemInggala of Borlien, beloved by the common-folk of Borlien and known as the "Queen of Queens," suffers embarrassment as she is wrongly accused of conspiring against her husband, banished to the tumbledown seaside palace of Gravabagalinien, and forced to accept a divorce that has been approved by the Holy Pannovalan Empire.

At the opening of the novel, the queen can do little but wait while in exile; she seeks counsel and comfort and, fearing for her life (as well as the lives of her children, Prince RobaydayAnganol and Princess TatromanAdala), she begs the Holy Pannovalan Emperor to consider excommunicating her husband from the faith if he should attempt to harm her or her children. Alas, her husband the king arrives, and in a brief ceremony they are divorced.

==== Prince RobaydayAnganol ====
The prince of Borlien, travels around, wild and hoping to avoid any association with his father, the King of Borlien. He associates with the Madis (a nomadic subspecies of Helliconian human that communicates mainly through songs and chantings, and understands little of the passing of time), and finds his way to Oldorando (which now knows a climate similar to that of a rainforest). His journeying, impulsiveness, and hatred of his own father get him into trouble, for he is in the end forced to face his father in a court setting.

==== (Ex) Chancellor SartoriIrvrash ====
Chancellor SartoriIrvrash has long served the royal house of Borlien. The present king of Borlien has just announced that he plans to divorce his queen in order to seek a more favourable political alliance. Once the people are aware that the queen is to be sent away to live out her days in exile, there is much astir in the Borlienese capital of Matrassyl. Knowing that the queen is much beloved by the people, and in order to avoid an uprising, the king has several of her supporters (called "Myrdolators") murdered as she is shipped away to Gravabagalinien. The king then blames this surge in violence on his chancellor and destroys his scholarly archives and curious collections. The situation is made worse for the chancellor when the king finds that he had been keeping a strange captive (Billy Xiao Pin) in the dungeons of the royal palace. Following this, SartoriIrvrash is dismissed from his role as chancellor.

The now ex-chancellor, left with next to nothing, chooses to travel around the world, first up to far northern Sibornal, then by ship along the western coast of Campannlat, and near strange southern Hespagorat. He realizes that the northerners have outrageously pragmatic attitudes, imperial ambitions, and technology more advanced than what the average Campannlatian has ever seen.

While near the remnants of an ancient land bridge that once connected Campannlat to Hespagorat, he encounters herds of Flambreg, cattle-like creatures that bear a suspicious resemblance to Phagors, and ends up discovering a great and heretical truth about Helliconia.

==== Billy Xiao Pin ====
On the space station Avernus, humans have been split into six clans, each meant to conduct specific duties in the study of Helliconia. Billy is a member of the Pin clan, which follows closely how a handful of families on Helliconia develop over the entirety of one Great Year.

In order to dull their confinement sickness, humans on Avernus have the opportunity to enter the occasional lottery to win a one-way ticket down to the planet. Billy wins one of these lotteries, goes down to the planet's surface, and, expecting to live for only a few weeks before his death via Helliconian microbes, hopes to meet Queen MyrdemInggala. As he begins to succumb to the Helico-virus (having no natural immunity against it), he imparts to some select natives a few truths about Helliconia and the universe at large.

=== Helliconia Winter ===
Set during late autumn in the northern continent, Sibornal. The book's protagonist, Luterin Shokerandit, is the son of the Keeper of the Wheel of Kharnabhar, located above the far north of Helliconia. The Wheel is an extraordinary revolving monastery/prison built into a ring-shaped tunnel with a single entrance and exit, powered entirely by the efforts of the prisoners pulling it along by means of chains set into the outer wall. Once a prisoner enters a cell of the Wheel, it is impossible for him to leave until its full ten-year rotation has passed.

Luterin joins the army, where he gains renown by killing the commandant of an enemy battalion, taking his widow Toress Lahl as a slave. Soon, however, the first cases of Fat Death begin to appear in the Sibornalese army. The Oligarch, autocratic ruler of Sibornal, orders other troops to destroy this army in an attempt to halt the spread of the epidemic. Luterin is warned by Captain Fashnalgid in time for the two of them to escape with Toress Lahl and a foreign trader who has arranged for a ship to flee the area. While the ship is at sea, the Fat Death spreads among those aboard; however, thanks to the skills of Toress Lahl, who was trained as a doctor, the major characters survive. It is during this voyage that a great deal of information is discovered about the deep past of the Helliconia-Batalix solar system, its capture by Freyr, and the intertwined fates of humans and phagors.

After the ship lands, the Oligarch's army continues to pursue the deserters. They go on the run again, hiring a dog-sledge with a semi-human driver and his phagor slave in order to cross the mountains. Fashnalgid mortally offends their driver by sleeping with his wife, and the driver retaliates by arranging for his phagor to push Fashnalgid off the sledge while they are travelling through a dangerous tunnel. Luterin tries to save Fashnalgid, but also falls from the sledge. He is forced to walk for miles through the polar cold until he eventually rejoins the sledge and is able to travel the rest of the way to his father's estate.

Once home, Luterin proclaims that he wishes to marry Toress Lahl rather than his arranged noble bride, and gives Toress the key to an ancient shrine. A few days later, he expresses hatred for the Oligarch who ordered his army to be destroyed. From his father's reactions, he realises that his father is in fact the Oligarch. Luterin kills his father and flees to the Wheel of Kharnabhar; he enters the Wheel and therefore remains in solitary confinement for ten years. When he at last emerges, he finds that the assassination of the former Oligarch is now seen as a positive event.

A party is arranged to celebrate Luterin's freedom and also to observe the day of Myrkwyr, when Freyr is seen for the last time, marking the beginning of the centuries-long great winter. After the festivities, the Master of Kharnabhar has Luterin seized, with the intent of throwing him back into the Wheel. For phagors, Myrkwyr indicates the return of conditions favourable to their kind, and a phagor tribe makes plans to regain their dominance over humans. The phagors attack the party; Luterin escapes in the confusion and is reunited with Toress Lahl. The book ends as they start to head for the shrine, where Toress Lahl has been living in hiding with their now ten-year-old son, and Luterin embraces uncertainty in the chiefly cyclical world.
