= Maryat Lee =

American playwright, theatre director

- Born: Mary Attaway Lee; May 26, 1923; Covington, Kentucky, U.S.
- Died: September 18, 1989 (aged 66); Lewisburg, West Virginia, U.S.
- Education: National Cathedral School; Northwestern University; Wellesley College; Columbia University; Union Theological Seminary (MA)
- Occupations: Playwright, theatre director
- Spouse: David Foulkes Taylor (m. 1957; died 1965)

Maryat Lee (born Mary Attaway Lee; May 26, 1923 – September 18, 1989) was an American playwright and theatre director who made important contributions to post-World War II avant-garde theatre, pioneering street theatre in Harlem and later founding the Eco Theater, which developed drama productions out of oral histories in Appalachia.

== Life and career ==
Lee was born in Covington, Kentucky; her father, Dewitt Collins Lee, was a lawyer and businessman, and her mother, Grace Dyer, was a musician. After graduating from the National Cathedral School she studied drama at Northwestern University, but found it too "artificial" and "commercial"; she transferred to Wellesley College, where she graduated with a degree in religious studies in 1945, then did graduate study at Columbia University and received an MA from Union Theological Seminary with a thesis on the religious origins of drama. At one point she worked for Margaret Mead.

Lee was a pioneer of street theatre in the 1950s. On a commission from the Parish Council, she wrote and produced Dope!, a one-act play about drug abuse that William French calls "the original modern street play"; it was performed in 1951 in a vacant lot in Harlem, the action including a junkie "shooting up" on stage. It attracted much press attention, and was named one of the best plays of the 1952–53 season; it continued to be widely performed for two decades. In 1970 two actors who had been in productions of the play died from heroin overdoses. During the 1950s she also worked with Jacob L. Moreno at his Institute of Psychodrama.

In 1965, when the street theatre movement was becoming popular, she founded the Soul and Latin Theater, known as SALT, in East Harlem, and taught street theatre classes at The New School.

In 1970 she moved to Powley Creek, near Hinton, West Virginia, and in 1975 founded the Eco Theater, for which she developed plays out of oral histories. In 1984 she incorporated the Eco Theater and moved to Lewisburg, where she taught her methods to enable it to spread as a theatre movement. She died from heart disease at her home there. Her papers are in the Regional and History collection at the West Virginia University library.

== Philosophy ==
Lee used local people in her productions in both New York and West Virginia. She believed that by teaching untrained actors for the first time, she could "bring out the hidden person underneath the roles and masks that society imposes." In a 1984 article in the precursor of Whole Earth Review, she wrote: "The words 'acting' and 'actor' have an association with pretension for most people outside the theater. I want something different. I just want people simply, and not so simply, to be themselves." She liked to quote Lope de Vega on the essence of theatre: "Three planks, two actors, and a passion". Her brother John described this and the use of oral histories as making her theatre "close to ecology".

EcoTheater initially used teenagers, who received a small stipend through a state grant for summer youth employment; later she used unpaid senior citizens. Lee wanted to have the drama arise from the society and reveal its ideals, as in the medieval English mystery plays. Audience participation was a major factor in both New York and West Virginia, and Eco Theater performances were followed by discussions. William French, who has published journal and encyclopedic articles on Lee, noted that Lee gave co-credit to the actors for writing A Double-Threaded Life: The Hinton Play, a series of monologues and dialogues performed on a bare stage. That play, which detailed the lives of ordinary people from Hinton, West Virginia, had no particular narrative line and sections were put in and taken out based on actors' availability. Crediting these performers was stretching the truth a bit: since "Lee exercise[d] firm artistic control over the final script, infusing it with poetic touches and revising it for economy and coherence", but, according to French, "the script reflects her desire to create a people's theatre".

== Personal life ==
Lee married an Australian furniture designer and artist, David Foulkes Taylor, in 1957; he died in 1965.They had no children together. She was however openly lesbian or bisexual. She was a friend of Flannery O'Connor (who sent her drafts of her work for comments and suggestions), and exchanged many letters with her. Her sexuality has been used to argue that O'Connor was also lesbian, but the idea is generally rejected.

== Selected publications ==
=== Plays ===
- Dope! (1953; rev. ed. 1967)
- The Classroom (1968, published online 2004)
- Day to Day (1969)
- Four Men and a Monster (1969)
- John Henry (1979, published online 2004)

=== Essays ===
- "Street Theatre in Harlem – Soul and Latin Theatre – SALT", Theatre Quarterly 2.8 (October–December 1972) 35–43
- "Legitimate Theatre Is Illegitimate", in Toward the Second Decade: The Impact of the Women's Movement on American Institutions, ed. Betty Justice and Renate Pore, Contributions in women's studies 25, Westport, Connecticut: Greenwood, 1981, ISBN 9780313221101
- "To Will One Thing", Drama Review 27.4, Anniversary Issue: Dreams, Proposals, Manifestos (Winter 1983) 47–53

== Productions ==
- 1950 – Christmas Mystery Play
- 1951 – Dope!
- 1955 – Kairos
- 1960 – Meat Hansom
- 1963 – The Tightrope Walker
- 1964 – Fulmania
- 1967 – Four Men and a Monster
- 1968 – After the Fashionshow
- 1968 – The Classroom
- 1969 – Luba
- 1970 – Day to Day
- 1971 – Fuse: A Mystery
- 1978 – Ole Miz Dacey
- 1979 – John Henry
- 1980 – The Day Hinton Died
- 1982 – The Hinton Play: A Double-Threaded Life
