= A Reverie for Mister Ray =

Collection of nonfiction work on speculative fiction

- Author: Michael Bishop; Michael H. Hutchins (editor)
- Cover artist: Jamie Bishop
- Language: English
- Genre: Nonfiction
- Publisher: PS Publishing
- Publication date: May 2005
- Publication place: United States
- Media type: Print (Slipcased, Signed & Numbered Hardback)
- Pages: 612
- ISBN: 1-902880-88-9
- OCLC: 63762403

A Reverie for Mister Ray: Reflections on Life, Death, and Speculative Fiction is a collection of nonfiction work by American writer Michael Bishop published in 2005 by PS Publishing. It includes essays and reviews from 1975 to 2004, originally published in a wide variety of newspapers, magazines, literary journals, and fanzines. Most of the pieces concern the speculative fiction genre. The book was edited by Michael H. Hutchins.

== Contents ==
=== Upfront ===
- A Reverie for Mister Mike: An Introduction by Jeff VanderMeer
- Alien Graffiti: Author’s Apologia by Michael Bishop
- On the Road: Editor’s Preface by Michael H. Hutchins

=== Drawing from the Wells ===
- A Reverie for Mister Ray [1981]
- A Classic Affair [1990]
- "An Art Is Something You Have to Learn”: RIP Clifton Fadiman [1999]
- Little, Big, Witless, Wise: Gulliver’s Travels by Jonathan Swift [2004]
- Flannery and Me [2001]
- More Than a Masterpiece? More Than Human by Theodore Sturgeon [1989]
- A Classic’s Endearing Quirks: The Left Hand of Darkness by Ursula K. Le Guin [1977]

=== State of the Art ===
- Evangels of Hope [1978]
- Believers and Heretics: An Episcopal Bull [1980]
- The Knack and How to Get It, See? [1978]
- The Contributors to Plenum Four [1975]
- Light Years and Dark: Science Fiction Since 1960 [1984]
- Children Who Survive: An Autobiographical Meditation on Horror Fiction [1989]
- 104 Really Cool Works of Twentieth-Century Fiction in English [2000]

=== On Reviewing ===
- Oh, to Be a Blurber! [1980]
- On Reviewing and Being Reviewed [1977]
- Critics’ Night at the Sci-Fi Bistro [1979]

=== Pitching Pennies Against the Starboard Bulkhead ===
- The Fifth Head of Cerberus by Gene Wolfe [1976]
- Timescape by Gregory Benford [1980]
- Wild Seed by Octavia Butler [1981]
- Myths of the Near Future by J. G. Ballard [1984]
- Two by John Crowley: Little, Big [1983] and Antiquities: Seven Stories [1994]
- Speaker for the Dead by Orson Scott Card [1987]
- The Toynbee Convector by Ray Bradbury [1988]
- Kim Stanley Robinson’s Mars Trilogy [1993/94/96]
- Nightfishing in Great Sky River by David Lunde [2000]
- The Wooden Sea by Jonathan Carroll [2001]
- He Do the Time Police in Different Voices by David Langford [2004]
- The Untethered Spacewalk by NASA [1984]

=== Going Deeper ===
- In Pursuit of Ubik: A Novel by Philip K. Dick [1979]
- Gene Wolfe as Hero: The Shadow of the Torturer [1980]
- Only in America: On Wings of Song by Thomas M. Disch [1981]
- James Morrow and Towing Jehovah [1994]
- James Morrow’s Antidote X: Speculative Satire and The Eternal Footman [2000]
- The Education of Brian W. Aldiss: The Twinkling of an Eye, or, My Life as an Englishman [1999]
- “Sitting in the Sun in the Waist-High Grass”: “The Last Day in July” by Gardner Dozois [2001]
- In Praise of Hollyhocks: “The Aliens Who Knew, I Mean, Everything” by George Alec Effinger [2004]

=== Fellow Travelers ===
- A Speculation of SF Writers: Gardner Dozois / Suzette Haden Elgin / Steven Utley / Ian Watson [1980]
- All That Glitters is Not Golding . . . Or Bishop Either [1984/85]
- James Tiptree, Jr. is Raccoona Sheldon is Alice B. Sheldon is Alli is... [1985/92]
- Saluting Pamela Sargent [1987]
- The Once and Future Andy Duncan [2000]
- Voice and Virtue: Celebrating Jack McDevitt [2003]

=== Rolling the Bones ===
- Ink and Inspiration Among the Soft Sciences [1981]
- Lucy in the Mud With Footprints: Lucy: The Beginnings of Humankind by Donald C. Johanson and Maitland A. Edey [1981]
- The Boy in the Bush: Lightning Bird by Lyall Watson [1982]
- Mysteries of the Rift Valley: One Life by Richard E. Leakey and Disclosing the Past by Mary Leakey [1984]
- The Fate of the Primate: The Deluge and the Ark: A Journey Into Primate Worlds by Dale Peterson [1989]
- Prospectus for a Novel of Human Prehistory, or The Origins of No Enemy But Time [1982]

=== Edge Running ===
- Primates in Love: The Female of the Species by Lionel Shriver [1987]
- Geniuses in One Another’s Pockets: Neighboring Lives by Thomas M. Disch and Charles Naylor [1981]
- Two by J. G. Ballard: Empire of the Sun and The Day of Creation [1984/1988]
- Two by Philip K. Dick: In Milton Lumky Territory and The Man Whose Teeth Were All Exactly Alike [1985]
- A Jeremiad, Three Reviews and a Postscript: Death is a Lonely Business by Ray Bradbury / Galápagos by Kurt Vonnegut / Contact by Carl Sagan [1985]
- Inconvenient Invitations: Mister Touch by Malcolm Bosse / Brazzaville Beach by William Boyd [1991]
- Watching the Elephant Vanish: The Elephant Vanishes by Haruki Murakami [1994]
- A Near-Future Southern, An Off-Trail Western: Land O’ Goshen by Charles McNair and Redeye by Clyde Edgerton [1995]
- A Larger Sky: The Norton Book of Ghost Stories edited by Brad Leithauser / Seaward by Brad Leithauser [1995]
- An American Wordsmith in Atlantis: Atlantis: Three Tales by Samuel R. Delany [1996]
- Touring the Republic of Pain: Ingenious Pain by Andrew Miller [1998]
- Encounter of a Wee Kind [1978]

=== Open Heart ===
- Military Brat: A Memoir [1997]
- First Novel, Seventh Novel: A Funeral for the Eyes of Fire [1988]
- My Private Civil War: Preface to Confederacy of the Dead [1993]
- Three Tributes: Paul Di Filippo / David Hartwell / Howard Waldrop [2001-2003]
- Cleansing the Eye of the Heart: A Dream of the Tattered Man by Randolph Loney [2001]
- Ghost of a Chance: My Father’s Ghost by Suzy McKee Charnas [2003]
- Nine Prescriptions for My Funeral [1997]
- Writing Science Fiction As If It Mattered (including “Tiny Bells” by Bruce Holland Rogers) [2002]
