= 1984 in literature =

This article contains information about the literary events and publications of 1984.

== Events ==
- April 4 – The narrative of George Orwell's dystopian novel Nineteen Eighty-Four (1949) begins and causes widespread discussion. G. K. Chesterton's The Napoleon of Notting Hill (1904) is also set in this year; and Haruki Murakami's 1Q84 (いちきゅうはちよん, Ichi-Kyū-Hachi-Yon, 2009–2010) is set in a parallel version of it.
- June 16 – Cirque du Soleil is founded in Baie-Saint-Paul, Quebec, by two former street performers, Guy Laliberté and Gilles Ste-Croix.
- July – Tom Wolfe's novel The Bonfire of the Vanities begins serialization in Rolling Stone.
- December 19 – Ted Hughes' appointment as Poet Laureate of the United Kingdom is announced in succession to Sir John Betjeman, Philip Larkin having turned down the post.
- unknown dates
  - Prvoslav Vujčić's second poetry collection, Kastriranje vetra (Castration of the Wind), written during a week's imprisonment in Tuzla for criticising the state, is banned in Yugoslavia.
  - Of Mice and Men, the 1937 novel by John Steinbeck, is removed from Tennessee public schools, when the School Board Chair promises to oust all "ostensibly filthy" books from public school curricula and libraries.
  - Redu in Belgium becomes a book town.
  - Saqi Books, an independent U.K. publisher, is founded by Mai Ghoussoub.

== New books ==
=== Fiction ===
- Warren Adler – Random Hearts
- Kingsley Amis – Stanley and the Women
- Martin Amis – Money
- V. C. Andrews – Seeds of Yesterday
- Jeffrey Archer – First Among Equals
- Richard Bachman (Stephen King) – Thinner
- Beryl Bainbridge – Watson's Apology
- J. G. Ballard – Empire of the Sun
- Iain Banks – The Wasp Factory
- René Barjavel – L'Enchanteur
- Julian Barnes – Flaubert's Parrot
- J. J. Benítez – Caballo de Troya
- Thomas Bernhard – Woodcutters (Holzfällen)
- J. Bernlef – Hersenschimmen (Out of Mind)
- Michael Bishop
  - One Winter in Eden
  - Who Made Stevie Crye?
- Simon Brett – A Shock to the System
- David Brin – The Practice Effect
- Anita Brookner – Hotel du Lac
- Anthony Burgess – Enderby's Dark Lady, or No End to Enderby
- Tom Clancy – The Hunt for Red October
- Maryse Condé – Segou: les murailles de terre
- Bernard & Judy Cornwell (as Susannah Kells) – Fallen Angels
- Michel Déon – Je vous écris d'Italie
- Joan Didion – Democracy
- Marguerite Duras – L'Amant
- Louise Erdrich – Love Medicine
- Howard Fast – The Outsider
- Leon Forrest – Two Wings to Veil My Face
- Frederick Forsyth – The Fourth Protocol
- John Gardner – Role of Honour
- William Gibson – Neuromancer
- William Golding – The Paper Men
- Alasdair Gray – 1982, Janine
- Suzette Haden Elgin — Native Tongue
- Kent Haruf – The Tie That Binds
- Frank Herbert – Heretics of Dune
- David Hughes – The Pork Butcher
- John Jakes – Love and War
- Stephen King, Peter Straub – The Talisman
- Russell Kirk – Watchers at the Strait Gate
- Jaan Kross – Professor Martens' Departure (Professor Martensi ärasõit)
- Milan Kundera – The Unbearable Lightness of Being (first published in French as L'Insoutenable légèreté de l'être)
- Sue Limb – Up the Garden Path
- Robert Ludlum – The Aquitaine Progression
- Norman Mailer – Tough Guys Don't Dance
- Ruth Manning-Sanders – A Book of Magic Horses
- Gladys Mitchell – The Crozier Pharaohs
- M. T. Vasudevan Nair – Randamoozham (രണ്ടാമൂഴം, Second Turn)
- Mitiarjuk Nappaaluk – Sanaaq
- Kem Nunn - Tapping the Source
- Robert B. Parker – Valediction
- Milorad Pavić – Dictionary of the Khazars
- Ellis Peters
  - Dead Man's Ransom
  - The Pilgrim of Hate
- Mario Puzo – The Sicilian
- Thomas Pynchon – Slow Learner: Early Stories
- Christoph Ransmayr – The Terrors of Ice and Darkness
- Pratibha Ray – Yajnaseni
- Bob Shea and Robert Anton Wilson – The Illuminatus! Trilogy (collected edition)
- Michael Slade – Headhunter
- Muriel Spark – The Only Problem
- Danielle Steel – Full Circle
- Neal Stephenson – The Big U (debut novel)
- Botho Strauß – The Young Man
- Robert Swindells – Brother in the Land
- Antonio Tabucchi – Indian Nocturne (Notturno indiano, novella)
- John Updike – The Witches of Eastwick
- Gore Vidal – Lincoln
- Tim Winton – Shallows
- Janusz Zajdel – Paradyzja

=== Children and young people ===
- Chris Van Allsburg – The Mysteries of Harris Burdick
- Sandra Cisneros - The House on Mango Street
- Helen Cresswell – The Secret World of Polly Flint
- Kevin Eastman and Peter Laird – Teenage Mutant Ninja Turtles (comic book)
- Mem Fox – Wilfrid Gordon McDonald Partridge
- Patricia Reilly Giff – The Beast in Ms. Rooney's Room (first in Polk Street School series)
- Gordon Korman – No Coins, Please
- Michelle Magorian – Back Home
- Bill Peet – Pamela Camel
- Dr. Seuss – The Butter Battle Book
- J. R. R. Tolkien (with Michael Hague) – The Hobbit

=== Drama ===
- Howard Barker – Scenes from an Execution
- Howard Brenton – Bloody Poetry
- Dario Fo – Elizabeth: Almost by Chance a Woman (Quasi per caso una donna: Elisabetta)
- Michael Frayn – Benefactors
- Beth Henley – The Miss Firecracker Contest
- Elfriede Jelinek – Illness or Modern Women (Krankheit oder Moderne Frauen, published)
- Joshua Sobol – Ghetto
- Tom Stoppard – Rough Crossing

=== Poetry ===
- John Ashbery – A Wave
- Louise Erdrich – Jacklight
- Christopher Gilbert – Across the Mutual Landscape
- Paulette Jiles – Celestial Navigation
- Sharon Olds – The Dead and the Living

=== Non-fiction ===
- Charles Berlitz – Atlantis: The Eighth Continent
- Church in Wales – Book of Common Prayer for use in the Church in Wales
- Morrill Cody and Hugh Ford – The Women of Montparnasse, the Americans in Paris
- Roald Dahl – Boy an autobiography
- Louise Hay – You Can Heal Your Life
- Lee Iacocca – Iacocca: An Autobiography
- Pauline Kael – Taking It All In
- Steven Levy – Hackers: Heroes of the Computer Revolution
- Audre Lorde – Sister Outsider: Essays and Speeches
- Robin Morgan (ed.) – Sisterhood Is Global
- M. Alice Ottoboni – The Dose Makes the Poison: A Plain-Language Guide to Toxicology
- Derek Parfit – Reasons and Persons
- Joan Peters – From Time Immemorial: The Origins of the Arab-Jewish Conflict over Palestine
- Dan Simonescu – Contribuții: literatura română medievală (Contributions: Medieval Romanian Literature)
- Herbert Jay Stern – Judgment in Berlin
- E. O. Wilson – Biophilia: The Human Bond with Other Species

== Births ==
- February 19 - Marissa Meyer, American science-fiction author
- April 16 – Amelia Atwater-Rhodes, American novelist
- May 9 – Ezra Klein, American journalist and columnist
- May 21 – Jackson Pearce, American young-adult novelist
- June 5 – Simon Rich, American humorist, novelist and screenwriter
- July 11 - Marie Lu, American young-adult novelist
- July 12 – Amanda Hocking, American fantasy novelist
- August 8 – Owen Jones, English columnist and author and commentator
- October 13 - Lauren DeStefano, American young-adult author
- November 20 – Halley Feiffer, American playwright and actress
- December 10 – Helen Oyeyemi, English novelist and playwright

== Deaths ==
- February 12 – Julio Cortázar, Argentine novelist, short story writer and essayist (born 1914)
- February 21 – Michail Sholokhov, Russian writer, Nobel Prize laureate (born 1905)
- February 22
  - Uwe Johnson, German writer in England (born 1934)
  - Jessamyn West, American novelist (born 1902)
- March 4 – Odd Bang-Hansen, Norwegian novelist and children's writer (born 1908)
- March 8 – Eleanor Graham, English children's writer and editor (born 1896)
- March 12 – Arnold Ridley, English playwright and actor (born 1896)
- March 26 – Branko Ćopić, Bosnian Serb writer (suicide, born 1915)
- April 1 – Elizabeth Goudge, English writer (born 1900)
- April 15
  - William Empson, English literary critic and poet (born 1906)
  - Alexander Trocchi, Scottish writer (born 1925)
- April 21
  - Marcel Janco, Romanian–Israeli artist, art theorist, essayist and poet (born 1895)
  - Manuel Mujica Láinez, Argentine novelist (born 1910)
- April 24 – Rafael Pérez y Pérez, Spanish writer (born 1891)
- May 16 – Irwin Shaw, American playwright, screenwriter and novelist (born 1913)
- May 19 – John Betjeman, English poet laureate (born 1906)
- June 6
  - A. Bertram Chandler, English-Australian soldier and author (born 1912)
  - Hugh Sykes Davies, English poet and novelist (born 1909)
- June 10 – Halide Nusret Zorlutuna, Turkish poet and novelist (born 1901)
- June 30 – Lillian Hellman, American playwright (born 1905)
- July 6 – Denys Val Baker, Welsh novelist and short story writer (born 1917)
- July 9 – Margaret Wetherby Williams (Margaret Erskine), English crime novelist (born 1901)
- August 14 – J. B. Priestley, English novelist and playwright (born 1894)
- August 25 – Truman Capote (Truman Streckfus Persons), American fiction writer (born 1924)
- September 7 – Liam O'Flaherty, Irish novelist and short story writer (born 1896)
- October 31 – Eduardo De Filippo, Italian playwright (born 1900)
- November 6 – Gastón Suárez, Bolivian novelist and dramatist (born 1929)
- November 10 – Xavier Herbert, Australian novelist (born 1901)
- November 12 – Chester Himes, American writer (born 1909)
- December 4 – Ștefan Voitec, Romanian politician and journalist (born 1900)
- December 6 – Gray Barker, American writer on paranormal (born 1925)
- December 14 – Vicente Aleixandre, Spanish writer, Nobel Prize laureate (born 1898)

== Awards ==
- Nobel Prize in Literature: Jaroslav Seifert

=== Australia ===
- The Australian/Vogel Literary Award: Kate Grenville, Lilian's Story
- Kenneth Slessor Prize for Poetry: Les Murray, The People's Other World
- Miles Franklin Award: Tim Winton, Shallows

=== Canada ===
- See 1984 Governor General's Awards for a complete list of winners and finalists for those awards.

=== France ===
- Prix Goncourt: Marguerite Duras, L'Amant
- Prix Médicis French: Bernard-Henri Lévy, Le Diable en tête
- Prix Médicis International: Elsa Morante, Aracoeli

=== Spain ===
- Miguel de Cervantes Prize: Ernesto Sabato

=== United Kingdom ===
- Betty Trask Award, established by Society of Authors, Prize: Ronald Frame, Winter Journey, Clare Nonhebel, Cold Showers
- Booker Prize: Anita Brookner, Hotel du Lac
- Carnegie Medal for children's literature: Margaret Mahy, The Changeover
- Cholmondeley Award: Michael Baldwin, Michael Hofmann, Carol Rumens
- Eric Gregory Award: Martyn Crucefix, Mick Imlah, Jamie McKendrick, Bill Smith, Carol Ann Duffy, Christopher Meredith, Peter Armstrong, Iain Bamforth
- James Tait Black Memorial Prize for fiction: J. G. Ballard, Empire of the Sun, and Angela Carter, Nights at the Circus
- James Tait Black Memorial Prize for biography: Lyndall Gordon, Virginia Woolf: A Writer's Life
- Whitbread Best Book Award: James Buchan, A Parish of Rich Women

=== United States ===
- Agnes Lynch Starrett Poetry Prize: Arthur Smith, Elegy on Independence Day
- Frost Medal: Jack Stadler
- Nebula Award: William Gibson, Neuromancer
- Newbery Medal for children's literature: Beverly Cleary, Dear Mr. Henshaw
- Pulitzer Prize for Drama: David Mamet, Glengarry Glen Ross
- Pulitzer Prize for Fiction: William J. Kennedy – Ironweed
- Pulitzer Prize for Poetry: Mary Oliver: American Primitive

=== Elsewhere ===
- Friedenspreis des Deutschen Buchhandels: Octavio Paz
- Premio Nadal: José de Tomás García – La otra orilla de la droga
