= International Association for the Fantastic in the Arts =

Professional organization in genre literature

- Founded: 1982
- Founder: Robert A. Collins
- Type: Professional organization
- Location: Orlando, Florida, U.S.
- Region served: Worldwide
- Method: Conferences, publications, listservs
- Field: Academic study of science fiction, fantasy, and horror
- Members: 450+
- Key people: David M. Higgins, president; Novella Brooks de Vita, first vice-president; Jim Casey, conference coordinator
- Volunteers: 23+
- Award: Crawford Award
- Website: www.iafa.org

The International Association for the Fantastic in the Arts (IAFA), founded in 1982 is a nonprofit association of scholars, writers, and publishers of science fiction, fantasy, and horror in literature, film, and the other arts. Its principal activities are the organization of the International Conference of the Fantastic in the Arts (ICFA), which was first held in 1980, the publication of a journal, the Journal of the Fantastic in the Arts (JFA), which has been published regularly since 1990, and the production of a news blog and other social media that publish information of interest to the membership.

Membership in the IAFA is open but almost all members are scholars, teachers, and graduate students in the field of science fiction studies or fantasy literature or horror literature, or are authors.

== The Conference ==
The International Conference on the Fantastic in the Arts (ICFA) is held annually in the spring. The conference has been held in Orlando, Florida since 2008.

The first ICFA was organized by Dr. Robert A. Collins of Florida Atlantic University in March 1980. The conference was held on the FAU campus and was supported by a gift of operating funds provided by Margaret Gaines Swann, mother of the late FAU professor and fantasy author Dr. Thomas Burnett Swann. In the following years, the conference was held in Boca Raton, Florida, Beaumont and Houston, Texas, and in Ft. Lauderdale, Florida, before settling in Orlando.

The ICFA is organized into divisions by topic, which can change to reflect changing interests of the members. Current divisions include: fairy tales and folk narrative (added after the 2017 ICFA), fantasy literature, gothic and horror literature, the international fantastic, science fiction literature, visual and performing arts and audiences, film and television, and children's and young adult literature and art. Proposals for conference presentations are submitted to a specific division, which is selected by the proposer, for review by the appropriate division head.

Anthologies of essays delivered at conferences from 1980 (published in the mid 80s) through 1994 have been called "the most comprehensive set of analyses of the fantastic in English."

As well as the presentation of research, the conference includes readings by invited authors, addresses by notable authors and scholars, workshops and social activities for students, and dramatic and sometimes humorous performances.

Numerous invited authors attend each year's conference and the event includes one or more guests of honor, generally authors. Recent guests of honor include Jeff VanderMeer (2021), Terry Windling (2016), James K. Morrow (2015), Ian McDonald and Nnedi Okorafor (2014), Neil Gaiman and Kij Johnson (2013), China Miéville and Kelly Link (2012), and Terry Bisson and Connie Willis (2011).

=== Themes ===
For much of its history, ICFAs have been organized around a theme of current interest to IAFA members. These themes have included:

- ICFA 47, 2026: Metacognition
- ICFA 46, 2025: Night Terrors
- ICFA 45, 2024: Whimsy
- ICFA 44, 2023: Afrofuturism
- ICFA 43, 2022: Fantastic Communities – held in-person
- ICFA 42, 2021: Climate Change and the Anthropocene – held on-line with over 550 attendees from 27 countries
- ICFA 41, 2020: Climate Change and the Anthropocene (Scheduled but not held due to the COVID-19 event of 2020–2021)
- ICFA 40, 2019: Politics and Conflict
- ICFA 39, 2018: Frankenstein Bicentennial
- ICFA 38, 2017: Epic Fantasy
- ICFA 37, 2016: Wonder Tales
- ICFA 36, 2015: The Scientific Imagination
- ICFA 35, 2014: Fantastic Empires
- ICFA 34, 2013: Fantastic Adaptations, Transformations, and Audiences
- ICFA 33, 2012: The Monstrous Fantastic
- ICFA 32, 2011: The Fantastic Ridiculous
- ICFA 31, 2010: Race and the Fantastic
- ICFA 30, 2009: Time and the Fantastic
- ICFA 29, 2008: The Fantastic in the Sublime
- ICFA 28, 2007: Representing Self and Other: Gender and Sexuality in the Fantastic
- ICFA 27, 2006: Drawn by the Fantastic: Comics, Graphic Novels, Art, and Literature
- ICFA 26, 2005: Blurring the Boundaries: Transrealism and Other Movements
- ICFA 25, 2004: Here There Be Dragons: The Global Fantastic
- ICFA 24, 2003: What Might Be Going to Have Been: Dark Myths and Legends in the Fantastic
- ICFA 23, 2002: Fantastic Visions: Re-Presenting the UnReal—The Fantastic in Children's Literature and Young Adult Literature and Art
- ICFA 22, 2001: 2001—Once and Future Odysseys
- ICFA 21, 2000: Looking Backward: The Fantastic Then and Now
- ICFA 20, 1999: Utopias/Dystopias
- ICFA 19, 1998: The War of the Worlds Centennial
- ICFA 18, 1997: Dracula Centennial

=== Awards ===
The following awards are presented at the conference:

==== The IAFA Distinguished Scholarship Award ====
The IAFA Distinguished Scholarship Award, presented annually since 1986, recognizes a career of distinguished contributions to the scholarship and criticism of the fantastic. Recipients deliver a keynote address at the annual conference.

Recipients of the IAFA Distinguished Scholarship Award

Year	Recipient
1986	Brian W. Aldiss
1987	Brian Stableford
1988	Kathryn Hume
1989	C. N. Manlove
1990	H. Bruce Franklin
1991	Brian Attebery
1992	Jack Zipes
1993	Devendra Varma
1994	James Flannery
1995	Peter Hunt
1996	T. A. Shippey
1997	N. Katherine Hayles
1998	Gary K. Wolfe
1999	John Clute
2000	Nina Auerbach
2001	Brooks Landon
2002	Roderick McGillis
2003	S. T. Joshi
2004	Marcial Souto
2005	Damien Broderick
2006	M. Thomas Inge
2007	Jane Donawerth
2008	Roger Luckhurst
2009	Maria Nikolajeva
2010	Takayuki Tatsumi
2011	Andrea Hairston
2012	Jeffrey Jerome Cohen
2013	Constance Penley
2014	Istvan Csicsery-Ronay Jr.
2015	Colin Milburn
2016	Cristina Bacchilega
2017	Edward James
2018	Fred Botting
2019	Mark Bould
2021	Stacy Alaimo
2022	Farah Mendlesohn

==== The IAFA William L. Crawford Fantasy Award ====
The Crawford Award, named for publisher William L. Crawford, recognizes a new writer whose first fantasy book was published during the previous calendar year. The award was established with the support of the late Andre Norton, who also helped establish the criteria.

==== Dell Magazines Award ====
The Dell Magazines Award for Undergraduate Excellence in Science Fiction and Fantasy Writing (formerly the Isaac Asimov Award) is presented to a full-time undergraduate college student for an unpublished and unsold science fiction or fantasy short story. The award includes a five hundred dollar prize and is co-sponsored by Dell Magazines, the IAFA, and the School of Mass Communications of the University of South Florida. The winner is invited to the annual conference and the winning story is considered for publication in Asimov's Science Fiction. Recent winners include Jack Hawkins (2022) for Hellish Takeout, Jazmin Collins (2021) for My Gardening Journal, Rona Wang (2020) for Imitation Game, Ana Maria Curtis (2019) for Military Sunset, Arthur Davis (2018) for Happy? Sad?, Taimur Ahmad (2017) for Noor, Rani Banjarian (2016) for Lullabies in Arabic, Kayla Chronister (2015) for How the Blood Spills, Rich Larson (2014) for Nostalgia Calculator, Lara Donnelly (2013) for To the Dogs, Rebekah Baldridge (2012) for Superposition, and Seth Dickinson (2011) for The Immaculate Conception of Private Ritter.

==== David G. Hartwell Emerging Scholar Award ====
The David G. Hartwell Emerging Scholar Award is an annual award and stipend presented to a graduate student for a paper presented at the conference. Previous winners include Robert Nguyen (2021), Filip Boratyn (2020), Sheetala Bhat (2019), Kelli Shermeyer (2018), Grant Dempsey (2017), Jordan S. Carroll (2016), Taylor Evans (2015), Melisa Kurtz (2014), Cassandra Bausman (2013), Timothy S. Miller (2012), and Mark DeCicco (2011). This award, the IAFA's general award for an outstanding student paper, was formerly called the Graduate Student Award. It was renamed the David G. Hartwell Emerging Scholar Award in 2016, in tribute to eminent editor and long-time IAFA Board member and book room manager David Hartwell.

==== Jamie Bishop Memorial Award for an Essay Not in English ====
The Jamie Bishop Memorial Award recognizes a critical essay on the fantastic written in a language other than English. The award is named for Jamie Bishop (1971–2007), who was among those killed in the Virginia Tech massacre of April 16, 2007. Jamie was the son of Michael Bishop, an award-winning science fiction writer, and Jeri Whitaker Bishop.

Previous winners include Natacha Vas-Deyres and Patrick Bergeron (2016), for Des fourmis et des hommes: voyage entomologique au cœur de la proto-science-fiction (1890–1950) (Of Ants and Men: An Entomological Journey to the Heart of Proto-Science Fiction (1890–1950)), Fernando Ángel Moreno, Mikel Peregrina, and Steven Bermúdez (2015), for Condiciones para el nacimiento de la ciencia ficción española contemporánea (Conditions for the Birth of Recent Spanish Science Fiction), Vera Cuntz-Leng (2014), Ezequiel De Rosso (2013) for La línea de sombra: literatura latinoamericana y ciencia ficción en tres novelas contemporáneas (The shadow line: Latin American literature and science fiction in three contemporary novels), Pampa Olga Arán (2012) for Lo unido y lo enhebrado: para una teoría del fantástico literario contemporáneo (The United and the Linked: Towards a Theory of Contemporary Fantastic Literature), and Alejo Steimberg (2011) for El futuro obturado: el cronotopo aislado en la ciencia ficción argentina pos-2001 (The Future Sealed Off: The Chronotope of Isolation in Argentine Science Fiction After 2001).

==== The Lord Ruthven Award ====
The Lord Ruthven Award is given annually at the ICFA by the Lord Ruthven Assembly, a group of academic scholars associated with the IAFA that specialize in vampire literature. The award is presented for the best fiction on vampires and the best academic work on the study of the vampire figure in culture and literature. The award is named after Lord Ruthven, one of the first vampires in English literature.

==== Walter James Miller Award ====
The Walter James Miller Memorial Award for Student Scholarship in the International Fantastic is given annually to the author of the best ICFA student paper devoted to a work or works of the fantastic originally created in a language other than English. In addition to scholarly excellence, the winning paper must also demonstrate the author's command of the relevant linguistic, national, and cultural contexts of the work or works discussed. The first Walter James Miller Award, given in 2015, was awarded to Andrés García Londoño, PhD Candidate in Hispanic Studies, University of Pennsylvania, for A Time without a Master. Proposals for an Alternative Future in Los pasos perdidos (The Lost Steps), by Alejo Carpentier.

==== Robert A. Collins Service Award ====
The Robert A. Collins Service Award is presented, when merited, to an officer, board member, or division head for outstanding service to the organization.

==== Stephen R. Donaldson Award ====
The Stephen R. Donaldson Award recognizes exceptional support and service to the organization from individuals who have not served as officers, board members, or division heads. It has been presented six times since its creation in 1997.

==== The Imagining Indigenous Futurisms Award ====
Beginning in 2020, The Imagining Indigenous Futurisms Award has been presented at the ICFA Awards Banquet. This award recognizes emerging authors in the Indigenous Futurisms movement who use science fiction to address issues of indigenous sovereignty and self-determination. Previous winners of the award include Julia A. Thompson (2020).

== Journal of the Fantastic in the Arts ==
The Journal of the Fantastic in the Arts (JFA), published regularly since 1990, is one of the four major academic journals that publish critical works concerning science fiction and the fantastic. The journal is interdisciplinary, publishing work on the fantastic in literature, art, drama, film, culture, and popular media. The JFA is run by the Editorial Collective of Jude Wright, Managing Editor-in-Chief; Novella Brooks de Vita, Acquisitions and Reviews Editor-in-Chief; Cat Ashton, Production Editor-in-Chief; and Tedd Hawks, Submissions Editor-in-Chief. It is published three times a year through Favian Press.

== Student Caucus ==
The Student Caucus of the IAFA (SCIAFA) is open to both graduate and undergraduate student members. The caucus sponsors a mentor program, a panel, and graduate student writing workshops at the conference. Panels are pragmatic in orientation and have included such topics as: "How to Publish a Paper", "Applying for Graduate Schools", and "Getting a Job". The SCIAFA president is an ex-officio member of the executive board.

== Lord Ruthven Assembly ==
The Lord Ruthven Assembly is a group of academic scholars specializing in vampire literature.

== BIPOC Caucus ==
The BIPOC Caucus is open to members who are classified as "black, indigenous, or people of color". The caucus sponsors safe spaces during the annual conference. The BIPOC president is an ex officio voting member of the executive board.

== Governance ==
The association is governed by an executive board that includes nine officers: President, First Vice-president, Second Vice-president, Treasurer, Public Information Officer, Conference Coordinator, Immediate Past President (ex-officio), Registration and Membership Coordinator, and Student Caucus Representative. Other officials are appointed by the President with the advice and consent of the other elected officers. These include the Chief Technology Officer, On-site Technology Officer, JFA Editor, Crawford Award Director, Program Book Editor, Director of the Dell Award, and the Book Room Liaison. The academic affairs of the annual conference are supervised by the vice-presidents of the IAFA and the division heads, which are appointed by the board.

The IAFA is registered in Florida, US, as a 501(c)(3) corporation—a "public charity" for literary and educational purposes.
