= Alix Lambert =

American film director

- Occupation: Artist
- Writing career
- Notable work: Deadwood

Alix Lambert is an American artist, filmmaker, author and television writer. She has been nominated for a Writers Guild of America Award for her work on Deadwood.

== Career ==
Alix Lambert's feature-length documentary The Mark of Cain was nominated for an Independent Spirit Award, received an honorable mention from the French Association of Journalism, and aired on Nightline. She went on to produce additional segments of Nightline as well as seven segments for the PBS series LIFE 360. She has directed and produced two other feature-length documentaries; Bayou Blue (made in collaboration with David McMahon) and Mentor. She also made Rabbits (2006). She is currently directing the feature-length documentary Goodbye, Fat Larry. She has directed numerous shorts and music videos including "You As You Were" for the band Shearwater (Sub Pop) and Tiffany (POV). Lambert has written for a number of magazines including Stop Smiling, ArtForum, The LA Weekly, and Filmmaker Magazine, to name a few. She wrote Episode 6, season 3 of Deadwood: "A Rich Find" (for which she was nominated for a WGA award) and was a staff writer and associate producer on John From Cincinnati. She was a writer on the video game Syndicate. As an artist Lambert has exhibited her work to international critical acclaim, showing in The Venice Biennale, The Museum of Modern Art, The Georges Pompidou Center, and the Kwangju Biennnale, to name a few. She is the author of four books: Mastering The Melon, The Silencing, Russian Prison Tattoos, and Crime. For theater, she has written and directed Crime, USA, which has been staged at Joe’s Pub in NYC, and the Cairns Festival in Australia and Crime, USA, Hartford, which was staged at Real Art Ways. Lambert co-founded and is co-artistic director of The Brooklyn International Theater Company (with Nelson George and Danny Simmons). She has conceived of and directed two original series for MOCAtv: Crime: The Animated Series and Ambiance Man. Additionally, she conceived of and directed the forthcoming Prison Zoo. She recently produced a segment for This American Life, and is directing a new series for BET Network called B4 They Were Famous. She received grants from the NEA, NYFA and The Roberts Foundation. Lambert has received residencies and/or fellowships from: The MacDowell Colony, Headlands, The Studios of Key West, The McColl Center, The MIT Media Lab in Cambridge and was The Booth Tarkington Writer in Residence at Butler University for the 2014–15 school year.

Lambert joined the crew of HBO Western drama Deadwood as a writer for the third season in 2006. The series was created by David Milch and focuses on the growth of a settlement in the American West. Lambert wrote the episode "A Rich Find". Lambert and the writing staff were nominated for a Writers Guild of America Award for Outstanding Drama Series at the February 2007 ceremony.

Lambert became an associate producer and staff writer for HBO surf noir John From Cincinnati. The series was created by Milch and Kem Nunn and focuses on the arrival of a messiah-like figure in a surfing community. Lambert wrote the episode "His Visit: Day Five". The series was canceled after completing its first season.

Lambert is also a documentary photographer represented by Gering & López Gallery in New York. She has previously shown at Susanne Vielmetter Los Angeles Projects.

== Filmography ==
Production staff

Year	Show	Role	Notes
2007	John From Cincinnati	Associate producer and staff writer	Season 1

Writer

Year	Show	Season	Episode title	Episode	Notes
2007	John From Cincinnati	1	"His Visit: Day Five"	6	
2007	Deadwood	3	"A Rich Find"	6	
