= Tapping the Source =

1984 novel by Kem Nunn

- Cover of first U.S. edition
- Author: Kem Nunn
- Genre: Fiction, Surf Noir
- Publisher: Delacorte Press
- Publication date: 1984
- Publication place: United States
- Media type: Print
- Pages: 301 (U.S. hardback)
- ISBN: 9780385292726
- OCLC: 9575060
- Dewey Decimal: 813/.54
- LC Class: PS3564.U49 T3 1984

Tapping the Source is a surf noir novel by Kem Nunn published in 1984. It is Nunn's debut novel and tells the story of a young man searching for his missing sister in the dark underbelly of California surf culture. It is widely considered to have pioneered the surf noir subgenre.

The novel has been translated into several languages using alternate titles, such as Wellenjagd (Wave Chasing), Surf City and Huntington Beach.

== Plot ==
A stranger in a white Camaro with two surfboards strapped to the top arrives at a service station in the desert town of San Arco, California looking for Ike Tucker. He finds the 18-year-old Ike working there, and tells him three surfers in Huntington Beach – Hound Adams, Frank Baker and Terry Jacobs – had taken Ike's sister, Ellen, to Mexico and mysteriously returned without her. Two years prior, Ellen had run away from San Arco in search of a better life and Ike had not heard from her since. Worried what became of her, Ike goes in search of his missing sister.

Ike travels to the Huntington Beach pier where the stranger said the three names surf each morning. But not knowing what they look like he rents a motel room along the Pacific Coast Highway and over the next few days makes several failed attempts to find them. Taken in by his new lively coastal surroundings, Ike decides to buy a surfboard and learn to surf.

One day by the pier, Ike uses his mechanic skills to fix the Harley-Davidson of local biker Preston Marsh. Preston takes a liking to Ike and hires him to do further repair work on the Harley. After Ike tells Preston his reason for coming to Huntington Beach, Preston warns the teenager to stay away from Hound Adams, whom he later points out to Ike surfing with Terry Jacobs by the pier. Ike eventually learns from Preston's girlfriend, Barbara, that Preston was once best friends with Hound and together they were up-and-coming local surf stars. They were also business partners, opening a surf shop together and branding their surfboards with logos of a flaming wave and the words "Tapping the Source." However, the two had a falling out that drove Preston to turn his back on surfing and enlist in the Vietnam War, after which he returned a changed man.

Ike keeps tabs on Hound and Terry Jacobs, following them one night to the surf shop and stumbling upon a meet-up between Preston and Frank Baker in the back alley. All the while Ike continues to progress at surfing. The following day in a rare return to his previous life, Preston takes Ike on a road trip to a secret surf spot located just below a ranch near Santa Barbara. On the last night of their surf trip, Preston is attacked by Terry Jacobs. Ike helps subdue Jacobs so the two can escape.

Three days after their return to Huntington Beach, Preston again fights Jacobs, who later dies from the injuries sustained. In retaliation, Jacobs' Samoan family track Preston down, severely beating him and using a lathe to brutally remove all his fingers. In the interim, Ike starts a relationship with Michelle, a young girl also staying at the motel. Michelle invites Ike to a party where he finally meets Hound. A blond-haired, sunburned guru of the local beach scene, Hound has an appealing allure that Ike finds hard to resist. Ike quickly gets sucked into Hound's seedy enterprises, helping to lure young runaway girls back to the surfer's home for drugs, sex and to be filmed in amateur porn.

Things come to a head when Michelle starts spending time alone with Hound and jealousies arise. Ike spirals out of control. While on a bender he runs into Barbara who informs Ike that Preston, still recovering from his injuries, had told her why Ike had come to Huntington Beach and brought up the name Janet Adams, the sister of Hound. Curious to know more, Barbara finds out that Janet had similarly gone missing on a trip to Mexico with Hound, Preston and the son of a rich Hollywood mogul, Milo Trax. Milo is a playboy who at one time made surf films and as it turns out is the owner of the ranch where Preston had taken Ike to surf.

Hound takes Michelle and Ike to meet Milo and are invited to an end-of-summer party at Trax Ranch. While at the party, Milo gives Michelle some jewelry that Ike instantly recognizes once belonged to his sister Ellen. Ike confronts Hound about Ellen and realizes that she never went to Mexico; something happened to her at the ranch. Realizing they are in trouble Ike tries to escape with Michelle, but before able to they are drugged by Hound and Milo. While doped up, Ike witnesses a cult-like ceremony with robed attendees and Michelle sacrificially laid out naked on a rock altar. Preston unexpectedly disrupts the Satanic scene, wielding a gun and shooting everyone on site, allowing Ike and Michelle to flee to safety.

In the aftermath, Michelle and Ike decide to leave Huntington Beach, separately, with a plan to meet-up again later. Ike attends the funeral of Preston, whose remains were recovered at the ranch. Before departing town, Ike confronts Frank Baker about Frank's meet-up with Preston in the surf shop's alley. Frank confesses that he had told Preston about the murder rituals at Trax Ranch, which explained why the biker went there to save Ike and Michelle from a similar fate. Frank also confides that the stranger in the white Camaro is his brother, who had a thing for Ellen and was misled to confuse Janet's story in Mexico with Ellen's disappearance at the ranch. Inside the surf shop originally started by Hound and Preston, Ike takes a photo of Preston surfing in his prime as a keepsake and uses surf wax to draw out the Tapping the Source logo on the wall before leaving for good.

== Inception ==
Kem Nunn's first attempts at writing were short stories based on people he knew from his hometown of Pomona in Los Angeles County. During his 20s, he moved into a converted garage in Newport Beach, performing odd jobs around the area and taking up surfing seriously. Towards the end of these self-proclaimed "lost years," Nunn took writing night classes at nearby Orange Coast College where he showed his stories to a substitute teacher. The teacher recommended Nunn send them to novelist Oakley Hall. At age 30, after enrolling to get his undergraduate degree, Nunn was invited by Hall to sit in on the writing program at UC Irvine and continue to work on what would become the manuscript for Tapping the Source.

Nunn was living in Huntington Beach at the time, which greatly influenced his writing, recalling:

Most of Orange County was becoming pretty homogenous and upscale. Huntington Beach was this weird little throwback where there were still biker bars and head shops. This kind of run-down main street very close to the beach. It also struck me that no one had really written about surfing in a realistic way, about what the culture is really like. It had always been Beach Blanket Bingo and Ride the Wild Surf. It was always very Hollywoodized, and no one had set a story in that culture. So that’s what I set out to do... tell it the way it really was.

The inspiration for his main character came from a young Huntington Beach local.

[He] turned up one day with a black eye and he had been ‘procuring’ runaway girls for this drug dealer biker who lived in town. This kid was street-tough but also had a sweet, innocent side. A real odd mix of toughness and innocence, he gave me the idea for the character of Ike Tucker, and I began to build the story around the idea of that character.

Nunn has cited The Catcher and the Rye by J.D. Salinger and Dog Soldiers by Robert Stone as influences. Coincidentally, Stone became the writer-in-residence at UC Irvine while Nunn was there. Despite being told by one of the program directors to not even bother reading Nunn's manuscript, Stone liked the novel-in-progress so much he helped to get it published.

Tapping the Source was sold by literary agent Rhoda Weyr to Delacorte Press for $17,500. The novel's opening includes the acknowledgment, "A special thanks to Oakley Hall for his perseverance on my behalf."

== Reception ==
The year of its release,Tapping the Source won the silver California Book Award for First Fiction and as its author Kem Nunn was a National Book Award finalist for First Work of Fiction.

At the time of the novel's publication, reviews were mixed on the plot but praised Nunn's talent as a budding novelist.The Washington Post described the book as a typical noir thriller containing "city boys with their dreams of 'tapping the source' through drugs or sex or surfing" and depicting "a world that is also fraught with touches of mysticism, as it is in [Robert] Stone and [Joan] Didion." The review continues by stating "Nunn stays cooler with tone and calmer with pace than most first novelists" and "the book leaves you with a feeling you can savor for days," though critiques that when it comes to surfing and Harleys "Nunn seems to know what he's talking about [...] but when he introduces full-bore evil in the form of a rich guy who's into kinky sex and ritual murder, authenticity wavers" before finally conceding that "he may not yet have proved himself a master of the genre, but he has made his mark." Kirkus Reviews stated that "Nunn demonstrates promising talent here – in stretches of quietly forceful narration" but criticizes that "he brings insufficient freshness, however, to a familiar, dated loss-of-innocence scenario – with the themes flatly announced at regular intervals." Writing for The New York Times, Wendy Lesser praised the portrayal of the main character but states "Ike alone is not enough to compensate for the novel's stale plot or its two-dimensional supporting characters, but he does make you want to keep an eye on Kem Nunn, who may well turn out to be a good storyteller once he finds a good story." Perhaps most glowingly, Frank Gannon of the Saturday Review proclaimed "what Hemingway’s Nick Adams did for fishing, Kem Nunn does for surfing."

Considered only a moderate commercial success upon its initial release, selling fewer than 10,000 copies, Tapping the Source has become highly regarded as a "surf noir masterpiece" and earned a cult following, with some surf shops having adopted the name. Upon subsequent reprints, online review sites like Crime Fiction Lover and The Rap Sheet heralded it as "one of the great American noir novels" and a "book you have to read," respectively.

== Film Adaptations ==
Shortly after its publication, the film rights to Tapping the Source were purchased by Martin Bregman at Universal Pictures, who was known for producing Scarface, Dog Day Afternoon and later Carlito's Way. The adaption went through eight rewrites by screenwriter Ron Koslow with Oscar-nominee Michael Apted set to direct at one point. In 2006, the son of Martin, Michael Bregman tried to revive the project, writing a 125-page revision with David Ellis attached to direct. The film was never made, but the rights deal earned Nunn considerably more than the book's royalties and allowed him to write his follow-up novel, Unassigned Territory.

In 2019, it was reported that screenwriter Martin Helgeland was adapting the novel, overseen by Universal's Executive Vice President of Production, Matt Reilly, with Nunn also set to produce.

It has been commonly cited that the 1991 film Point Break was inspired by Tapping the Source. Asked whether the sale of the book's film rights was the origin of Point Break, Kem Nunn responded:

It’s not exactly right, but that’s the story you hear get told a lot! [...] somebody sent me a script, Point Break was originally titled Johnny Utah, and said they’re ripping off your story. But I said that it’s not really my story anymore, talk to Marty Bergman, as Universal now own the film rights. But in my mind the only inter connection is a guy trying to infiltrate the surfer world to find out something. I don’t think there’s too much of a connection between my book and that movie, but it gets mentioned all the time.

Point Break was produced by Largo Entertainment and written by W. Peter Iliff based on a story idea by Rick King. While there are some similarities between the plots, as well as the film's characterization of Patrick Swayze's Bodhi to the book's character Hound Adams, neither King nor Iliff have ever publicly stated they drew inspiration from the book.
