= Who Made Stevie Crye? =

1984 novel by Michael Bishop

- Dust-jacket illustration by Glennray Tutor.
- Author: Michael Bishop
- Illustrator: Jeffrey K. Potter
- Cover artist: Glennray Tutor
- Language: English
- Genre: Horror
- Publisher: Arkham House
- Publication date: 1984
- Publication place: United States
- Media type: Print (Hardback)
- Pages: 309
- ISBN: 0-87054-099-8
- OCLC: 10723399
- Dewey Decimal: 813/.54 19
- LC Class: PS3552.I772 W5 1984

Who Made Stevie Crye?, subtitled A Novel of the American South, is a horror novel by American writer Michael Bishop. It was released in 1984 by Arkham House in an edition of 3,591 copies, and later in paperback by Headline. It was the author's first novel and third book published by Arkham House.

A 30th Anniversary Edition was published by Fairwood Press in August 2014, including a new introduction by Jack Slay and a new afterword by the author. It also reprints the full-page black and white illustrations by J. K. Potter which were originally commissioned for the Arkham House edition.

== Plot summary ==
The story concerns Mary Stevenson Crye, a newly widowed housewife, who turns to freelance writing to provide for her family. Her typewriter, which is demonically possessed, involves her in a series of occult events.

== Reception ==
Dave Langford reviewed Who Made Stevie Crye? for White Dwarf #97, and stated that "Every possible double meaning in the title gets its due airing, and I defy you to predict the outrageous final chapter. Buy this one."

== Reviews ==
- Review by Debbie Notkin (1984) in Locus, #286 November 1984
- Review by Mary Gentle (1984) in Interzone, #10 Winter 1984/85
- Review by Joe Sanders (1984) in Fantasy Review, December 1984
- Review by Doc Kennedy (1985) in Rod Serling's The Twilight Zone Magazine, March–April 1985
- Review [French] by Élisabeth Campos (1986) in Fiction, #370
- Review by Charles L. Grant (1986) in American Fantasy, Fall 1986
- Review by Barbara Davies (1988) in Vector 143
- Review by Ian Watson (1988) in Horror: 100 Best Books, (1988)

== Sources ==
- Jaffery, Sheldon (1989). The Arkham House Companion. Mercer Island, WA: Starmont House, Inc. p. 136. ISBN 1-55742-005-X.
- Chalker, Jack L.; Mark Owings (1998). The Science-Fantasy Publishers: A Bibliographic History, 1923-1998. Westminster, MD and Baltimore: Mirage Press, Ltd. p. 55.
- Joshi, S.T. (1999). Sixty Years of Arkham House: A History and Bibliography. Sauk City, WI: Arkham House. p. 152. ISBN 0-87054-176-5.
- Nielsen, Leon (2004). Arkham House Books: A Collector's Guide. Jefferson, NC and London: McFarland & Company, Inc. p. 130. ISBN 0-7864-1785-4.
