= John from Cincinnati =

- Genre: Drama; Magical realism
- Created by: David Milch; Kem Nunn
- Starring: Bruce Greenwood; Rebecca De Mornay; Austin Nichols; Ed O'Neill; Luke Perry; Keala Kennelly; Luis Guzmán; Willie Garson; Matt Winston; Garret Dillahunt; Brian Van Holt; Jim Beaver; Greyson Fletcher; Dayton Callie; Paula Malcomson; Emily Rose; Mark-Paul Gosselaar; Jennifer Grey
- Opening theme: "Johnny Appleseed" by The Mescaleros
- Composers: Johnny Klimek; Reinhold Heil
- Country of origin: United States
- Original language: English
- No. of seasons: 1
- No. of episodes: 10

Production
- Executive producers: David Milch; Gregg Fienberg; Mark Tinker
- Producer: Ted Mann
- Production location: Imperial Beach, California
- Running time: 47-57 minutes
- Production companies: Red Board Productions; Saticoy Productions; HBO Enterprises

Original release
- Network: HBO
- Release: June 10 – August 12, 2007

John from Cincinnati is an American drama television series, set against the surfing community of Imperial Beach, California. It aired on HBO from June 10 to August 12, 2007.

== Overview ==
John from Cincinnati is the result of a collaborative effort between writer/producer David Milch and author Kem Nunn, whose novels have been termed "surf noir". The program, which combines elements of drama and magic realism, deals with a strange, young man of mysterious origin and his effect on a dysfunctional family of professional surfers and their community.

The series includes surfing sequences by surfers such as Brock Little, Keala Kennelly, Dan Malloy, John-John Florence, Shane Beschen, and Herbie Fletcher.

The series' theme song is "Johnny Appleseed," performed by Joe Strummer and the Mescaleros. A diverse soundtrack includes "Tic" by Kava Kava and songs from TV on the Radio, Muse, Buddy Guy, Kasabian, and the Yardbirds.

== Cast and characters ==
- Bruce Greenwood as Mitch Yost: An aging and proud professional surfer who co-owns a surf shop with his wife. Their marriage is tumultuous, primarily due to Mitch's self-indulgent behavior and Cissy's overbearing personality. Mitch has come to believe that surfing should be an end unto itself, and that judged competitive events have tainted the sport.
- Rebecca De Mornay as Cissy Yost: Mitch's stubborn wife and co-owner of the surf shop. It is revealed that when her son Butchie was an adolescent, and she was under the influence of LSD, Cissy caught him masturbating and proceeded to show him "how to do that." Her regret and self-recrimination over this event had a serious impact on her emotions.
- Brian Van Holt as Mitch "Butchie" Yost II: Mitch's heroin-addicted son and professional surfer, whose painful adolescence has rendered him emasculated and incapable of shouldering great responsibility. Became a professional surfer after signing with Linc Stark then revolutionized the sport by popularizing aerials in surfing.
- Austin Nichols as John Monad: A mysterious person, seemingly mentally disabled, who often repeats what he has already heard or what people are thinking, and can manifest requested objects through his pockets. He appears to be able to perform astral projection. During the projection, John is able to converse naturally, without resorting to only repeating words already spoken by others. His last name refers to the Greek word monas, a term the Pythagoreans linked to God as the original "one" from whom all else flows, a clue to a secret divinity or primal "oneness".
- Ed O'Neill as Bill Jacks: An obsessive retired police officer and friend of the Yosts who tends to babble and talk to himself, and constantly tries to fill the hole that Butchie has made in Shaun's life. His house is filled with caged birds, with whom he converses.
- Luke Perry as Linc Stark: A surf talent scout, manager and agent. Owner of Stinkweed surf products. Recently bought out by his financial backers.
- Luis Guzmán as Ramon Gaviota: Manager and caretaker of the Snug Harbor Motel.
- Matt Winston as Barry Cunningham: A mentally unstable man who recently won the Mega Millions lottery and bought the local Snug Harbor Motel; went to grade school with Butchie. He experienced sexual abuse by Mr. Rollins in room 24 of the motel as a child and originally purchased it with the intent to tear it down. Was bullied in high school, specifically by Butchie Yost. A blow to the head caused him to develop epileptic seizures during which he has visions that guide his decisions.
- Willie Garson as Meyer Dickstein: Lawyer and huge surf fan who hangs around the Snug Harbor Motel, and who arranged the sale of the hotel to the new owner, Barry Cunningham.
- Jennifer Grey as Daphne: Meyer Dickstein's fiancée.
- Greyson Fletcher as Shaun Yost: 14-year-old son of Butchie Yost and Tina Blake; surf prodigy. Tina gave Shaun to his grandparents, Cissy and Mitch Yost, to raise the day he was born.
- Keala Kennelly as Kai: A young woman surfer who works at the Yosts' surf shop. She is friends with Shaun Yost, and usually surfs with him. Dated Butchie in high school.
- Jim Beaver as Vietnam Joe: A war veteran who helps people cross the Mexican border into the U.S. illegally. Grows and smokes marijuana.
- Garret Dillahunt as Dr. Michael Smith: The neurologist who treated Shaun after a surfing accident. Subsequently resigned to shield Shaun from undue scrutiny after Shaun's miracle recovery from a broken neck sustained while winning his first surf competition.
- Dayton Callie as Steady Freddie Lopez: A drug dealer from Hawaii with ties to the Yost family, particularly Butchie.
- Emily Rose as Cass: A filmmaker formerly employed by Linc Stark to seduce Mitch and break up Mitch and Cissy's marriage because, unlike Cissy, Mitch does not want Shaun to become a competition surfer, especially with Linc Stark, whom Mitch blames for Butchie's disastrous failings.
- Paul Ben-Victor as Palaka: An associate of Steady Freddie Lopez.
- Chandra West as Tina Blake: Shaun's mother. She now works as a pornographic actress and prostitute but wants to leave the business.
- Mark-Paul Gosselaar as Jake Ferris: Linc Stark's business partner.
- Matthew Maher as Dwayne: Harelipped maintainer of the Yost family web site. Usually works out of Jerri's coffee shop.
- Paula Malcomson as Jerri: Operates local coffee shop.

== Ratings and cancellation ==
The pilot for the series was shown directly after the highly anticipated series finale of The Sopranos, but it failed to sustain an audience. The Sopranos received an audience of 11.9 million people according to Nielsen ratings, but John from Cincinnati held onto only 3.4 million viewers. Subsequent episodes initially lost viewers, but ratings began to see a slow increase, and by the final episode viewership had reached over 3 million, more than some episodes of Deadwood.

One day after the season finale aired, HBO canceled the show.

== Episodes ==
No.	Title	Directed by	Written by	Original release date	Prod. code
1	"His Visit, Day One"	Mark Tinker	David Milch & Kem Nunn	June 10, 2007	101
A stranger called John arrives in a small shore-side town — Imperial Beach, California — near the Mexican border, where he befriends a legendary surfing family, the Yosts. Meanwhile, Mitch prohibits his grandson, Shaun, from attending a surfing competition, and Dickstein and Ramon meet the Snug Harbor Motel's new owner.
2	"His Visit, Day Two"	Gregg Fienberg	Kem Nunn	June 17, 2007	102
A drug dealer surfaces on Imperial Beach looking for Butchie. Linc expresses interest in sponsoring Shaun in his next competition. Barry decides not to raze the Snug Harbor Motel after a vision tells him not to.
3	"His Visit, Day Two Continued"	Mark Tinker	Ted Mann	June 24, 2007	103
Dr. Smith is brought to a revelation that something miraculous occurred in Shaun's hospital room in order to revive him. Kai brings John back to her home to determine whether he is telling the truth. Cass turns out to be a source of comfort for Mitch, who is completely oblivious to her affiliation with Linc.
4	"His Visit, Day Three"	John McNaughton	Regina Corrado	July 1, 2007	104
Some thugs rough up John; Kai connects with Butchie; Dr. Smith gets a new patient; Shaun's mother arrives in Imperial Beach.
5	"His Visit, Day Four"	Ed Bianchi	Steve Hawk	July 8, 2007	105
Zippy issues Bill an unusual mandate; Shaun's porn-star mother lets the Yosts know she's back.
6	"His Visit, Day Five"	Tom Vaughan	Alix Lambert	July 15, 2007	106
John tries to help Cissy and Bill confront events that occurred in the past. Meanwhile, Butchie attempts to organize a reunion between his son Shaun and biological mother Tina.
7	"His Visit, Day Six"	Jeremy Podeswa	Nichole Beattie	July 22, 2007	107
Linc's Stinkweed reign is challenged; Dwayne eyes Shaun's online future; Dr. Smith tends to Palaka.
8	"His Visit, Day Seven"	Jesse Bochco	Abby Gewanter	July 29, 2007	108
The citizens of Imperial Beach fear for Shaun's safety after John gives them an ominous message.
9	"His Visit, Day Eight"	Adam Davidson	Wayne Loren Wilson	August 5, 2007	109
Shaun goes missing, and it is posited that John may be a robot.
10	"His Visit, Day Nine"	Dan Minahan	Zack Whedon	August 12, 2007	110
Butchie and Kai wake up to a joyous revelation: Shaun has returned, surfing into the beach with John; but he can't explain where he's been. Imperial Beach plays host to a makeshift parade organized by a revamped Stinkweed. The episode, and the series itself, ends with a cryptic message by John, "Mother of God, Cass-Kai", super-imposed over a clip of Kai surfing.

== Home media ==
John from Cincinnati: The Complete First Season
Details
Special Features
- 10 episodes on 3 discs
- 16:9 Anamorphic Widescreen (1.78:1) Aspect Ratio
- Audio: English 5.1, more languages depending on DVD region code
- Several subtitles, depending on DVD region code
- Packaging: Digipak
- Two audio commentaries by show creator David Milch.
- Behind-the-Scenes Featurette focusing on the sequences with the visions characters had in the "Day 5" episode.
Region 1
Region 2
Region 4
April 1, 2008
July 20, 2009
September 3, 2008
