= One Winter in Eden =

1984 collection of science fiction and fantasy stories by Michael Bishop

- Dust-jacket illustration by Raymond Bayless for One Winter in Eden
- Author: Michael Bishop
- Illustrator: Andrew Smith
- Cover artist: Raymond Bayless
- Language: English
- Genre: Science fiction, fantasy
- Publisher: Arkham House
- Publication date: 1984
- Publication place: United States
- Media type: Print (hardback)
- Pages: xiv, 273 pp
- ISBN: 0-87054-096-3
- OCLC: 10277081
- Dewey Decimal: 813/.54 19
- LC Class: PS3552.I772 O5 1984

One Winter in Eden is a collection of science fiction and fantasy stories by author Michael Bishop. It was released in 1984 by Arkham House in an edition of 3,596 copies. It was the author's second book published by Arkham House.

== Contents ==
One Winter in Eden contains the following tales:

1. "Introductions", by Thomas M. Disch
2. "One Winter in Eden"
3. "Seasons of Belief"
4. "Cold War Orphans"
5. "The Yukio Mishima Cultural Association of Kudzu Valley, Georgia"
6. "Out of the Mouths of Olympus"
7. "Patriots"
8. "Collaborating"
9. "Within the Walls of Tyre"
10. "The Monkey's Bride"
11. "Vernalfest Morning"
12. "Saving Face"
13. "The Quickening"

== Sources ==
- Jaffery, Sheldon (1989). The Arkham House Companion. Mercer Island, WA: Starmont House, Inc. p. 135. ISBN 1-55742-005-X.
- Chalker, Jack L.; Mark Owings (1998). The Science-Fantasy Publishers: A Bibliographic History, 1923-1998. Westminster, MD and Baltimore: Mirage Press, Ltd. p. 55.
- Joshi, S.T. (1999). Sixty Years of Arkham House: A History and Bibliography. Sauk City, WI: Arkham House. p. 151. ISBN 0-87054-176-5.
- Nielsen, Leon (2004). Arkham House Books: A Collector's Guide. Jefferson, NC and London: McFarland & Company, Inc. p. 130. ISBN 0-7864-1785-4.
