= Transfigurations (novel) =

1979 novel by Michael Bishop

First US edition (publ. Berkley Books) Cover art by Mike Hinge

Transfigurations is a novel by Michael Bishop published in 1979.

== Plot summary ==
Transfigurations is a novel in which an anthropologist studies the Asadi, a culturally and technologically undeveloped anthropoid alien race on a world named BoskVeld, who communicate through bioluminescence. Egon Chaney, the original anthropologist sent from the Galactic Community ("Glaktik Kom") to Boskveld, disappeared six years before the events of the story took place, but his daughter Elegy Cather has taken over her father's mission, accompanied by a genetically modified baboon/chimpanzee hybrid, Kretzoi, who may be able to communicate directly with the Azadi. Cather and her associates hope to prove that the Asadi have developed sentience, technology and religious ritual.

== Reception ==
Greg Costikyan reviewed Transfigurations in Ares Magazine #8 and commented that "Despite its narrative flaws, Transfigurations is exceptionally well written, and Bishop is a writer whose work deserves close attention."

Kirkus Reviews states "Some intriguing speculations about behavior -- but Bishop's usually engaging curiosity blends poorly here with the traditional furniture of outer-space fiction."

== Reviews ==
- Review by Tom Easton (1980) in Analog Science Fiction/Science Fact, January 1980
- Review by Charles N. Brown (1980) in Locus, #230 February 1980
- Review by John Clute (1980) in Foundation, #19 June 1980
- Review by Joseph Nicholas (1980) in Vector 98
- Review by Theodore Sturgeon (1981) in Rod Serling's The Twilight Zone Magazine, June 1981
