= Chance (TV series) =

American crime drama television series (2016–2017)

- Title card
- Genre: Crime drama; Psychological thriller; Mystery
- Based on: Chance by Kem Nunn
- Developed by: Kem Nunn; Alexandra Cunningham
- Starring: Hugh Laurie; Ethan Suplee; Greta Lee; Stefania LaVie Owen; Clarke Peters; Diane Farr
- Theme music composer: Bear McCreary
- Composer: Will Bates
- Country of origin: United States
- Original language: English
- No. of seasons: 2
- No. of episodes: 20

Production
- Executive producers: Brian Grazer; Hugh Laurie; Lenny Abrahamson; Michael London; Kem Nunn; Alexandra Cunningham
- Producer: Jane Bartelme
- Production location: San Francisco, California
- Cinematography: Terry Stacey
- Running time: 41–50 minutes
- Production companies: Nutmegger; Kem Nunn Stories, Inc.; Groundswell Productions; Fox 21 Television Studios

Original release
- Network: Hulu
- Release: October 19, 2016 – November 29, 2017

Chance is an American television series created by Kem Nunn and Alexandra Cunningham which stars Hugh Laurie. The series is based on Nunn's 2014 book of the same name and was ordered straight-to-series in January 2016 with a straight two-season order containing twenty episodes. It premiered on Hulu on October 19, 2016. The second season premiered on October 11, 2017. On January 9, 2018, the series was cancelled.

Season 1 of the production participated in the San Francisco "Scene in San Francisco Incentive Program" administered by the San Francisco Film Commission.

== Premise ==
The series focuses on a forensic neuropsychiatrist, Dr. Eldon Chance, living in San Francisco, who is semi-willingly pulled into his patient Jaclyn Blackstone's dangerous life of police corruption, manipulation, and abuse. While dealing with a divorce of his own and secrets he has been trying to hold back for years, he has to save Jaclyn, as well as himself, from her abusive partner, a corrupt police detective. Chance enlists the aid of an intelligent but violent furniture restorer, Darius, who moonlights as a quasi-mercenary, and they receive low-key assistance in their vigilante endeavor from a morally ambiguous cop, Detective Hynes.

In the second season, Hynes blackmails Chance and Darius into going after a software tycoon who may secretly be a serial killer, while the pair also use Darius's fighting skills to bring justice to the various abusers of Chance's patients. The once mild-mannered Chance finds himself drawn more deeply into Darius's view of violence as a solution to problems, while also dealing with his daughter's continuing struggle with mental health problems she may have inherited from him.

== Cast ==
=== Main ===
- Hugh Laurie as Dr. Eldon Chance
- Ethan Suplee as Darius 'D' Pringle
- LisaGay Hamilton as Suzanne Simms (season 1)
- Greta Lee as Lucy Baek
- Stefania LaVie Owen as Nicole Chance, Chance's teenage daughter.
- Paul Adelstein as Raymond Blackstone (season 1)
- Gretchen Mol as Jaclyn Blackstone, a woman being physically and mentally abused by her husband, Raymond. As a result of her abuse, she has developed a secondary personality, known as 'Jackie Black'. (season 1)
- Clarke Peters as Carl Allan (recurring, season 1; main, season 2)
- Brian Goodman as Detective Kevin Hynes (recurring, season 1; main, season 2)
- Paul Schneider as Ryan Winter (season 2)

=== Recurring ===
- Diane Farr as Christina Chance, Chance's ex-wife
- Michael McGrady as Sanford Pringle
- Elizabeth Rodriguez as Kristen Clayton (season 2)
- Alyson Reed as Lindsay (season 2)
- Ginger Gonzaga as Lorena (season 2)
- Tim Griffin as ADA Frank Lambert (season 2)

== Episodes ==
=== Season 1 (2016) ===
No. overall	No. in season	Title	Directed by	Written by	Original release date
1	1	"The Summer of Love"	Lenny Abrahamson	Alexandra Cunningham & Kem Nunn	October 19, 2016
2	2	"The Axiom of Choice"	Lenny Abrahamson	Alexandra Cunningham	October 19, 2016
3	3	"Hiring It Done"	Michael Lehmann	Kem Nunn	October 26, 2016
4	4	"The Mad Doctor"	Carl Franklin	Peter Elkoff	November 2, 2016
5	5	"A Still Point in the Turning World"	Roxann Dawson	Victoria Morrow	November 9, 2016
6	6	"The Unflinching Spark"	Dan Attias	Sara Gran	November 16, 2016
7	7	"Unlocking Your Hidden Powers"	Michael Lehmann	Alexandra Cunningham & Kem Nunn	November 23, 2016
8	8	"The House of Space and Time"	Andrew Bernstein	Peter Elkoff & Victoria Morrow	November 30, 2016
9	9	"Camera Obscura"	Dan Attias	Sara Gran & Pete Begler	December 7, 2016
10	10	"Fluid Management"	Michael Lehmann	Alexandra Cunningham & Kem Nunn	December 14, 2016

=== Season 2 (2017) ===
No. overall	No. in season	Title	Directed by	Written by	Original release date
11	1	"Multiaxial System"	Jonas Pate	Alexandra Cunningham & Kem Nunn	October 11, 2017
12	2	"A Very Special Onion"	Roxann Dawson	Peter Elkoff	October 11, 2017
13	3	"The Flitcraft Parable"	Carl Franklin	Alyson Evans & Steve Kornacki	October 11, 2017
14	4	"The Coping Mechanism"	Nelson McCormick	Dave Flebotte	October 18, 2017
15	5	"The Collected Works of William Shakespeare"	Jonas Pate	Andrew Gettens & Lauren Mackenzie	October 25, 2017
16	6	"Treasures in Jars of Clay"	Dan Attias	Ryan Parrott	November 1, 2017
17	7	"Define Normal"	Nelson McCormick	Peter Elkoff	November 8, 2017
18	8	"An Infant, A Brute or a Wild Beast"	Andrew Bernstein	Steve Kornacki & Alyson Evans	November 15, 2017
19	9	"A Madness of Two"	Jonas Pate	Kem Nunn	November 22, 2017
20	10	"Especially If You Run Away"	Nelson McCormick	Alexandra Cunningham & Kem Nunn	November 29, 2017

== Release ==
Both seasons of Chance were later released on Disney+ via the Star hub in selected territories following Disney's acquisition of 20th Century Fox which included the show's distributor and production company Fox 21 Television Studios.

== Reception ==
=== Critical response ===
On Rotten Tomatoes, the series has an approval rating of 75% based on 32 reviews. The website's critics consensus reads, "Chance is an entertaining and profoundly dark thriller primarily kept afloat by Hugh Laurie's outstanding performance."
