= Gregg Fienberg =

American television director and producer

- Born: September 12, 1960 (age 66); Southern California, U.S.
- Occupations: Television producer Director
- Writing career
- Notable works: True Blood, Deadwood, Twin Peaks

Gregg Fienberg (born September 12, 1960) is an American television producer and director. He worked on the Western drama Deadwood in both capacities and received a Directors Guild of America Award and two Emmy Award nominations for the series. He was an Emmy nominated producer for the mystery series Twin Peaks. He was also the executive producer and unit production manager for the HBO series True Blood.

== Biography ==
Fienberg was born and raised in Southern California, and is the third of four children.

=== Early career ===
He was a producer for the 1984 film Voice in Exile. He worked on several music videos in the early 1990s and worked with Madonna, Michael Jackson and U2.

In 1990 made his television debut with the series Twin Peaks. Fienberg served as a production manager and producer for the first season. Fienberg and the production staff were nominated for an Emmy Award for Outstanding Drama Series at the 42nd Primetime Emmy Awards. He returned as a production manager and supervising producer for the second and final season in 1991. He served as unit production manager for the follow-up feature Twin Peaks: Fire Walk With Me in 1992. Also in 1992 Fienberg was a production manager for the pilot of Lynch and Frost's short-lived next series, On The Air.

In 1993 Fienberg worked as a producer on the first season of submarine adventure seaQuest DSV. He was a producer for the film Dead Connection in 1994. He was producer and unit production manager for the horror sequel Candyman: Farewell to the Flesh in 1995. He was a co-producer for the series Fame L.A. in 1997. In 1998 Fienberg worked as a producer and unit production manager for the film Gods and Monsters.

=== 2000s ===
In 2001 Fienberg began a long association with the HBO cable network. He served as a co-executive producer for the first season of the comedy The Mind of the Married Man in 2001. Fienberg was also a co-executive producer for the first season of HBO depression era drama Carnivàle in 2003.

In 2004 Fienberg became a co-executive producer and unit production manager of HBO Western drama Deadwood. As unit production manager Fienberg won a plaque from the Directors Guild of America at the 2004 Awards for Outstanding Directing for a Drama Series for his work on the series pilot. He shared the award with the episodes director Walter Hill and the team of assistant directors. He was promoted to executive producer for the second season in 2005. He also made his directing debut on the second-season episodes "Complications" and "The Whores Can Come". He was nominated for an Emmy for Outstanding Directing for a Drama Series at the 57th Primetime Emmy Awards for his debut "Complications". That year, Fienberg and the production staff were also nominated for the Primetime Emmy Award for Outstanding Drama Series. He returned as an executive producer for the third and final season in 2006. He directed the episodes "True Colors" and "The Catbird Seat". Also in 2006 Fienberg served as a co-executive producer and unit production manager for the pilot of HBO polygamy drama Big Love.

In 2007 Fienberg became an executive producer for HBO surf noir John From Cincinnati and directed the episode "His Visit: Day Two". The series was canceled after one season.

In 2009 Fienberg became unit production manager and executive producer for the second season of HBO supernatural drama True Blood. The series was created by Alan Ball and focuses on a small Louisiana town after vampires reveal their existence to the world. He would return as an executive producer for the third season in 2010. In September 2013, HBO officially announced that True Blood had been renewed for a seventh and final season that would premiere in Summer 2014.

In April 2020, he co-founded the "It Takes Our Village" initiative, with Bruna Papandrea and several other Hollywood producers, to help raise money for below-the-line crews affected by the COVID-19 pandemic.

== Filmography ==
=== Television ===
Production staff

Year	Show	Role	Notes
2019	Deadwood: The Movie	Executive producer	Television film
2018	Sharp Objects	Executive producer and unit production manager	Miniseries
2017–2019	Big Little Lies	Executive producer and unit production manager	Season 1–2
2009–2014	True Blood	Executive producer and unit production manager	Seasons 2–7
2007	John from Cincinnati	Executive producer	Season 1
2006	Big Love	Co-executive producer and unit production manager	Pilot only
2006	Deadwood	Executive producer	Season 3
2005	Deadwood	Executive producer	Season 2
2004	Deadwood	Co-executive producer and unit production manager	Season 1
2003	Carnivàle	Co-executive producer	Season 1
2001	The Mind of the Married Man	Co-executive producer	Season 1
1993	Class of '61	Producer	Television film
1993	SeaQuest DSV	Producer	Season 1
1992	On The Air	Producer and production manager	Pilot only
1991	Twin Peaks	Supervising producer and production manager	Season 2
1990	Twin Peaks	Supervising producer and production manager	Season 2
1990	Twin Peaks	Producer and production manager	Season 1

Director

Year	Show	Season	Episode title	Episode	Notes
2014	True Blood	7	"Death Is Not the End"	4	
2007	John from Cincinnati	1	"His Visit: Day Two"	2	
2006	Deadwood	3	"The Catbird Seat"	11	
2006	Deadwood	3	"True Colors"	3	
2005	Deadwood	2	"The Whores Can Come"	11	
2005	Deadwood	2	"Complications"	5	

=== Film ===
Production staff

Year	Film	Role	Notes
1998	Gods and Monsters	Producer and unit production manager	
1995	Candyman: Farewell to the Flesh	Producer and unit production manager	
1994	Dead Connection	Producer	
1992	Twin Peaks: Fire Walk with Me	Producer and unit production manager	
1984	Voice in Exile	Producer	
