= Life Regarded as a Jigsaw Puzzle of Highly Lustrous Cats =

1992 short story by Michael Bishop

"Life Regarded as a Jigsaw Puzzle of Highly Lustrous Cats" is a science fiction short story by Michael Bishop. It was first published in Omni in 1992.

== Synopsis ==
As a prisoner is interrogated, he is subjected to electrical brain stimulation, causing him to randomly re-experience all his cat-related memories.

== Reception ==
"Life Regarded as a Jigsaw Puzzle of Highly Lustrous Cats" was a finalist for the Nebula Award for Best Short Story of 1992.

The New York Times considered it to be "cleverly plotted, economically rendered and emotionally astute". The Sun-Sentinel found it "as demanding as any so-called metafiction".
