= Brittle Innings =

1994 novel by Michael Bishop

- Cover of the 1994 Bantam Books edition
- Author: Michael Bishop
- Language: English
- Publication date: 1994

Brittle Innings is a 1994 science fiction/fantasy novel by American author Michael Bishop.

== Synopsis ==
During the Second World War, Daniel Boles joins a minor league baseball team in Georgia, where he discovers that his teammate "Jumbo" Hank Clerval is actually Frankenstein's monster.

== Reception ==
Brittle Innings won the 1995 Locus Award for Best Fantasy Novel, and was a finalist for the 1995 Hugo Award for Best Novel, the 1995 John W. Campbell Memorial Award for Best Science Fiction Novel, and the 1995 World Fantasy Award for Best Novel.

Brian Stableford stated that the notion of Frankenstein's monster playing minor-league baseball in the American Deep South during the Second World War "may appear to be one of the most ridiculous combinations of motifs ever devised", but nonetheless lauded the book as "reveal[ing] exactly how great [Bishop's] ability is," and noted that its emotive power derives from the fact that both Boles and Clerval are "desperate to become 'real persons'", ultimately declaring it to be the "best sequel (to Frankenstein) imaginable".

Nick Gevers called it a "masterpiece".

The New York Times questioned the necessity of including supernatural elements in a baseball story, stating that despite Bishop's "fine prose", the monster belonged in a separate novel.

The New York Review of Science Fiction observed parallels between Boles and the protagonist of Somerset Maugham's Of Human Bondage; Bishop subsequently responded that he had been "completely unaware" of these parallels while writing the story.
