= Blooded on Arachne =

1982 collection of science fiction stories by Michael Bishop

- Dust-jacket illustration by Ron Walotsky for Blooded on Arachne
- Author: Michael Bishop
- Illustrator: GlennRay Tutor
- Cover artist: Ron Walotsky
- Language: English
- Genre: Science fiction short stories, poetry
- Publisher: Arkham House
- Publication date: January 1982
- Publication place: United States
- Media type: Print (hardback)
- Pages: xiii, 338 pp
- ISBN: 0-87054-093-9
- OCLC: 7596853

Blooded on Arachne is a collection of science fiction stories by American author Michael Bishop. It was published in 1982 by Arkham House in an edition of 4,081 copies. The volume, Bishop's first short fiction collection, contains two novellas as well as two poems.

== Contents ==
1. Preface
2. "Among the Hominids at Olduvai" (poem)
3. "Blooded on Arachne"
4. "Cathadonian Odyssey"
5. "Effigies"
6. "The House of Compassionate Sharers"
7. "In Chinistrex Fortronza the People are Machines"
8. "Leaps of Faith"
9. "On the Street of the Serpents" (novella)
10. "Piñon Fall"
11. "Rogue Tomato"
12. "Spacemen and Gypsies"
13. "The White Otters of Childhood" (novella)
14. "For the Lady of a Physicist" (poem)

== Reprints ==
New York: Timescape/Pocket (paperback), January 1983.
