= The Dose Makes the Poison =

The Dose Makes the Poison: A Plain Language Guide to Toxicology
- 3rd edition cover
- Author: M. Alice Ottoboni, Patricia Frank
- Language: English
- Subjects: Toxicology
- Publisher: John Wiley & Sons, Inc.
- Publication date: 1984
- Media type: Print (Paperback)
- Pages: 262
- ISBN: 978-0-470-38112-0

The Dose Makes the Poison: A Plain Language Guide to Toxicology is a book originally written by M. Alice Ottoboni and published in 1984 by Vincente Books to help laypeople understand what she considered to be an unfounded fear of synthetic chemicals. A second edition was published in 1991 and a third, revised by Patricia Frank, was released in 2011.

== About the author ==
M. Alice Ottoboni is a toxicologist who served over twenty years in the California Department of Health Services. Along with lecturing and consulting on toxicology and the environmental factors concerning public health, Ottoboni was also a scientific adviser to the American Council on Science and Health in New York.

Patricia Frank, president of a toxicology consultancy, revised the book for its third edition. She works with companies to develop and register pharmaceutical agents for use with humans and animals. Frank is a member and former president of the American College of Toxicology and Roundtable of Toxicology Consultants.

"All chemicals follow the same rules: the laws of nature. By knowing these rules, I have a perspective that protects me from needless worry and unreasoning fear. My hope is that this book will give you the same perspective."

— Alice Ottoboni

== Overview ==
The Dose Makes the Poison: A Plain-Language Guide to Toxicology, written by Ottoboni, in its first and second editions, focused mainly on environmental and industrial chemicals. The author, defining toxicology as "the study of adverse systemic effects of chemicals," details factors which toxicologists use to determine the hazards of common chemicals to individuals: dose, duration, and route of exposure (dermal, inhalation, oral). The age, sex, and general health of the individual also play a role in toxicity. Ottoboni discusses the distinction between acute toxicity and chronic toxicity, suggesting ways to assess risk and avoid lethal doses or accidental poisonings.

Ottoboni provides readers with information about mutagens, teratogens, and carcinogens, which cause systemic changes at a cellular level, and raises the question "Can the carcinogenicity of a chemical be separated from its toxicity?" Because of scientists' differing views on this question, Ottoboni advocates working with environmentalists, agriculture, industry, and government officials to develop a unifying theory, devise public policy, and put in place regulatory systems for the use of toxic substances.

The third edition of The Dose Makes the Poison continues with these themes, but adds to the discussion "drugs, food additives, cosmetics, vitamins, second hand smoke, lead in toys imported from China, the nonsteroidal anti-inflammatory drug (NSAID) cyclooxyogenase (COX) issues, and bisphenyl A found in plastics."

== Reception ==
Ottoboni received praise for her measured, step-by-step approach to toxicology and writing style that makes accessible to non-scientists material that could otherwise be "overwhelmingly technical." Examples and illustrations used in the book to reinforce concepts are "practical and realistic". Though not as detailed, referenced, or annotated as a toxicology textbook, The Dose Makes the Poison: A Plain Language Guide to Toxicology, is recommended by reviewers as a basic guidebook and entry point in learning about the field of toxicology.

== See also ==
- "The dose makes the poison" – an adage credited to Paracelsus, a 16th century physician
