= Steven Utley =

American novelist

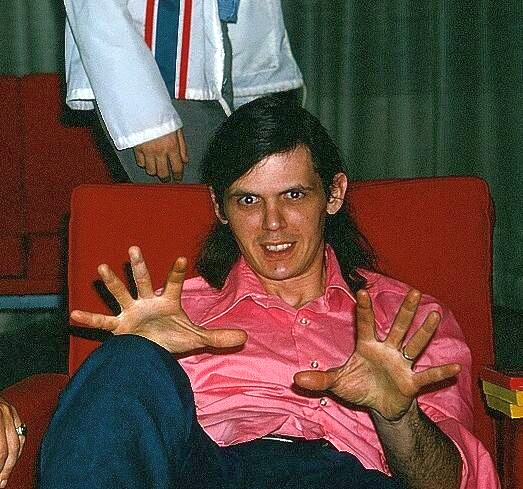
Steven Utley at AggieCon IV, March 1973.

Steven Utley (November 10, 1948—January 12, 2013) was an American writer. He wrote poems, humorous essays and other non-fiction, and worked on comic books and cartoons, but was best known for his science fiction stories.

== Biography ==
Utley was born in the family of an Air Force non-commissioned officer and grew up on Air Force bases in the United States, Great Britain, and Okinawa. During the 1970s, he joined a group of science fiction writers in Austin, Texas, which included Lisa Tuttle, Howard Waldrop, and Bruce Sterling; the group was later formalized as Turkey City Writer's Workshop. Utley's first professionally published story, "The Unkindest Cut of All," a parody of Hugo Gernsbackian scientifiction, appeared in 1972. Since then he published widely in and out of the science-fiction field, and his work has been translated into a dozen languages. The Encyclopedia of Science Fiction calls him "a figure of edgy salience," and Gardner Dozois, who as editor of Asimov's Science Fiction published most of Utley's output during the 1990s, has suggested that he "may be the most under-rated science fiction writer alive," calling him a writer "of strength, suppleness, and seemingly endless resource ... able to turn his hand to almost any subject matter, mood, or type of story imaginable, and ... unafraid to tackle any of them."

The Turkey City writers collaborated prolifically among themselves during the 1970s, and Utley and Waldrop produced two oft-reprinted stories, "Custer's Last Jump" (a Nebula Award finalist following its publication in 1976) and "Black as the Pit, From Pole to Pole" (1977), regarded as prototypes of steampunk science fiction. These appear in Custer's Last Jump! and Other Collaborations (Golden Gryphon Press, 2003) along with Waldrop stories co-written by Leigh Kennedy, Bruce Sterling, Al Jackson, Jake Saunders, and George R. R. Martin. Three collaborations with Lisa Tuttle, including "Flies by Night" (1975), another story frequently reprinted and translated, appear in Utley's 2005 collection, The Beasts of Love, for which Tuttle provided an introduction.

Utley may be best known for his "Silurian Tales," launched in Asimov's Science Fiction in 1993 and continued in not only that magazine but also The Magazine of Fantasy and Science Fiction, Analog Science Fiction and Fact, and the webzines Sci Fiction and Revolution Science Fiction. Described by Brian Stableford in Science Fact and Science Fiction: An Encyclopedia as "[t]he most elaborate reconstruction of a past era in recent speculative fiction," the series employs a variety of literary techniques in recounting the adventures and misadventures of a scientific expedition in the Paleozoic Era and also addresses some implications of the "many-worlds" hypothesis in quantum physics; several of the stories have been reprinted in Gardner Dozois' Year's Best Science Fiction anthologies and the competing Year's Best SF edited by David G. Hartwell and Kathryn Cramer. Ticonderoga Publications, based in Australia, released the Silurian Tales in two volumes titled The 400-Million-Year Itch (in 2012) and Invisible Kingdoms (in 2013).

A separate series of time-travel stories, launched in Galaxy in 1976 but developed extensively in Asimov's Science Fiction during the 1990s, deals with so-called "chronopaths" and has been collected in book form under the title Where or When (2006).

Since 1997, Utley made his home in Tennessee, but referred to himself as "an internationally unknown author."

Utley was diagnosed with stage four cancer in early December 2012, fell into a coma on January 11, 2013, and died the following night.

== Bibliography ==
=== Short fiction ===
Collections

- Utley, Steven & Howard Waldrop (1996). Custer's last jump. Nedlands, W.A.: Ticonderoga Publications.
- Ghost Seas (stories), Ticonderoga Publications, Australia, 1997
- This Impatient Ape (verse), Anamnesis Press, 1998
- Career Moves of the Gods (verse), Anamnesis Press, 2000
- The Beasts of Love (stories), Wheatland Press, 2005
- Where or When (stories), PS Publishing Ltd., Great Britain, 2006
- The 400-Million-Year Itch: Silurian Tales, Volume 1, Ticonderoga Publications, Australia, 2012
- Invisible Kingdoms: Silurian Tales, Volume 2, Ticonderoga Publications, Australia, 2013

Stories

Title	Year	First published	Reprinted/collected	Notes
Cloud by van Gogh	2000	Utley, Steven (Dec 2000). "Cloud by van Gogh". F&SF. 99 (6): 120–130.		
Custer's last jump	1976		Utley, Steven & Howard Waldrop (1996). Custer's last jump. Nedlands, W.A.: Ticonderoga Publications.	
Look away	1992	Utley, Steven (1992). "Look away". F&SF.		
Shattering	2012	Utley, Steven (Oct–Nov 2012). "Shattering". Asimov's Science Fiction.		
Sleepless years	2008	Utley, Steven (October–November 2008). "Sleepless years". F&SF. 115 (4&5): 41–53.		

=== Books edited by Steven Utley ===
- Lone Star Universe (with Geo. W. Proctor), Heidelberg Publishers, 1976
- Passing for Human (with Michael Bishop), PS Publishing Ltd., 2009, Great Britain

=== Poetry ===
Collections

- The impatient ape
- Career moves of the gods
