= The Day of Creation =

1987 novel by J. G. Ballard

- Cover of first edition (hardcover)
- Author: J. G. Ballard
- Language: English
- Genre: Thriller
- Publisher: Victor Gollancz Ltd
- Publication date: 1987
- Publication place: United Kingdom
- Media type: Print (Hardcover & Paperback)
- Pages: 254 pp
- ISBN: 0-575-04152-8
- OCLC: 17918501
- Dewey Decimal: 823/.914 19
- LC Class: PR6052.A46 D38 1987

The Day of Creation is a 1987 novel by British writer J. G. Ballard.

== Plot summary ==
The main character of the novel is the World Health Organization doctor John Mallory who, six months after his arrival in Central Africa, finds that intense guerrilla activity has left him without patients. He devotes himself, instead, to the task of bringing water to the region, with dreams of setting the Sahara in flower. When he accidentally manages to achieve his task by creating a river, he becomes prey of an increasingly delirious spiral of fantasies, starting to identify himself with the new river that he has dubbed "Mallory". Obsessed, he decides to go up the river in order to "kill" its source, together with a teenaged African girl, whom he considers a sort of spirit of the waters, and other characters including a half-blind British documentary filmmaker and two ruthless local chieftains trying to take advantage of the new prosperity brought by the water.

== Reviews ==
- Vector 141 (p 18)
