= No Enemy But Time =

1982 science fiction novel by Michael Bishop

- Cover of first edition (hardcover)
- Author: Michael Bishop
- Language: English
- Genre: Science fiction novel
- Publisher: Timescape Books/Simon & Schuster
- Publication date: 1982
- Publication place: United States
- Media type: Print (hardback & paperback)
- Pages: 397 pp
- ISBN: 0-671-44973-7
- OCLC: 7976185
- Dewey Decimal: 813/.54 19
- LC Class: PS3552.I772 N6 1982

No Enemy But Time is a 1982 science fiction novel by Michael Bishop. It won the 1982 Nebula Award for Best Novel, and was also nominated for the 1983 John W. Campbell Memorial Award. It was included in David Pringle's book Science Fiction: The 100 Best Novels.

== Plot synopsis ==
The novel follows the story of a modern black American man who is able to mentally project himself back to pre-human Africa, where he meets (and eventually mates) with humanity's prehistoric ancestors.

At less than one year old, John Monegal is abandoned by his mother and adopted by USAF officer Hugo Monegal and his wife Jeanette. Since the very beginning of his life, John dreams of an ancient world and becomes an expert of the Pleistocene epoch, the era of the Homo habilis in Africa. When he is 18, John gets in touch with a paleonthologist, Alistair Patrick Blair, who serves as prime minister in the fictional country of Zarakal (approximately representing Kenya according to the author's preface) and works closely with a US physical scientist, Woodrow Kaprow, who has developed a time machine which brings John back to the era he dreams of. Just before leaving to the past, John discovers his mother wants to publish a book based on voice records of his dreams, and angry and deluded, he leaves her house and changes his name into Joshua Kampa.

Almost lost in the remote past of a world which is the frontier between non-human and human life, John/Joshua feels he has reached the reality he always belonged to, and is accepted by a group of individuals who live in the African savanna. He gives a name to all his new friends, and learns to eat and live like them. Joshua starts thinking he will never get back to the 20th century. After a while he falls in love with a pre-historic woman, Helen, who gets pregnant and dies at the daughter's birth. To save his child and let her survive in a better world, Joshua goes back to the area of the time machine, where he is mysteriously saved by two African astronauts apparently coming from the future. Back to his actual life, Joshua finds he lost his dreaming power and learns that only a month in modern world's time has passed since he left; this is why he struggles in being believed about his daughter. As years pass, Joshua learns his daughter has the same dreaming power he used to have, but she is projected towards the future.

After several years Joshua becomes a minister of the Zarakali government, and his 15-year-old daughter escapes with an agent from Uganda, Dick Aruj, who has convinced her to join a program of time travel to the future.
