= Marcial Souto =

Marcial Souto (born 1947 in A Coruña, Spain) is a Spanish-born Argentine science fiction writer.

Souto originally moved to Uruguay, but has lived in Argentina since 1970. In Argentina he created magazines and in 1985 edited La ciencia ficción en la Argentina, which is one of the most important anthologies of Argentine science fiction. He also translated the work of Ray Bradbury and others into Spanish.

He won the Karel Prize for SF translation. His work is said to involve the enigmatic nature of physical reality and human perception.
