= Jamie Bishop =

American academic

- Born: Christopher James Bishop; November 9, 1971; Colorado Springs, Colorado, U.S.
- Died: April 16, 2007 (aged 35); Blacksburg, Virginia, U.S.
- Cause of death: Gunshot wounds
- Education: University of Georgia; Christian-Albrechts University
- Spouse: Stephanie Hofer
- Scientific career
- Fields: German language
- Workplaces: University of North Carolina at Chapel Hill; Virginia Tech

Christopher James "Jamie" Bishop (November 9, 1971 – April 16, 2007) was an American instructor of German language at Virginia Polytechnic Institute and State University, as well as an artist and craftsman. He was among those shot and killed in the Virginia Tech shooting. He was the son of Michael Bishop, an award-winning science fiction author.

== Biography ==
Bishop grew up in Pine Mountain, Georgia, and earned his bachelor's and master's degrees in German from the University of Georgia. He was a Fulbright scholar at Christian-Albrechts University in Kiel, Germany. He helped run an exchange program at Darmstadt University of Technology in Germany. Bishop spent four years living in Germany, where (according to his web site) he "spent most of his time learning the language, teaching English, drinking large quantities of wheat beer and wooing a certain fraulein," Stephanie Hofer, who later became his wife. From 1995 to 1996 he taught at the Zentrales Sprachlabor of Ruprecht-Karls University of Heidelberg, and collected survey data for his Master's Thesis, Jugendsprache: a critical study of German "Youth Language."

Before teaching at Virginia Tech, Bishop worked in the Office of Arts and Sciences Information Services (OASIS) as an academic-technology liaison at the University of North Carolina at Chapel Hill, where he provided technical support for faculty and staff members and graduate students. While at UNC, in addition to instructing German language classes, he developed a software package for students to digitally record and submit spoken language assignments to professors, a significant improvement over the previously used magnetic tape method. He received an OASIS Director's Choice Award in 2004.

He left UNC in 2004 for Virginia Tech, where he was an instructor in German, and taught information technology for VT's Faculty Development Institute. In addition to being a German teacher, Bishop was a multimedia artist, photographer and graphic designer, who spoke of "changing the world with art". He produced the cover art for Michael Jasper's book Gunning for the Buddha, and for five of Michael Bishop's books; and designed "ingenious pieces of furniture." One of Bishop's "haunting" wrap-around book jackets is featured on the anthology Passing for Human, edited by Michael Bishop and Steve Utley.

According to Michael Bishop, Jamie "spoke German like a native, understood computers inside out, played drums in a basement band, bicycled and hiked, followed the fortunes of the Atlanta Braves as obsessively as his mother, grandmothers, and I did, and made friends everywhere. He was a people lover from the get-go, and his energy levels put mine to shame."

== Death ==
Bishop was killed on April 16, 2007, during the Virginia Tech shooting, while teaching an Introductory German class with 15 to 20 students. Four students lost their lives: Lauren McCain, Michael Pohle Jr., Maxine Turner and Nicole White. Two more made it out alive without critical or serious injury while six others were injured and helped barricade the door to prevent the shooter entering the classroom a second time.

== Memorials ==
A scholarship fund was established in Jamie Bishop's name for German majors at Virginia Tech.

The annual "Jamie Bishop Memorial Award for an Essay Not in English" was established by the International Association for the Fantastic in the Arts as a prize for an essay on the subject of science fiction or speculative fiction not written in English, open to students and scholars presenting papers at the International Conference on the Fantastic in the Arts.
