= Michael Bishop (author) =

American author (1945–2023)

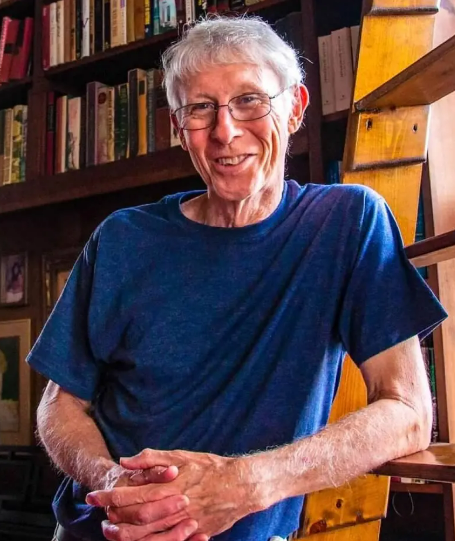
- Born: November 12, 1945; Lincoln, Nebraska, U.S.
- Died: November 13, 2023 (aged 78); LaGrange, Georgia, U.S.
- Education: University of Georgia (BA, MA)
- Occupations: Novelist; short story writer; essayist; poet; teacher
- Spouse: Jeri Whitaker (m. 1969)
- Children: 2 including Jamie Bishop
- Writing career
- Period: 1970–2021
- Genres: Science fiction, fantasy, horror, speculative fiction, poetry
- Subjects: Anthropology, religion, American South
- Website: michaelbishop-writer.com

Michael Lawson Bishop (November 12, 1945 – November 13, 2023) was an American author. Over five decades and in more than thirty books, he created what has been called a "body of work that stands among the most admired and influential in modern science fiction and fantasy literature."

== Biography ==
Michael Lawson Bishop was born on November 12, 1945, in Lincoln, Nebraska, the son of Leotis "Lee" Bishop and Maxine ("Mac") Elaine Matison. His parents met in the summer of 1942 when his father, a recent enlistee of the Army Air Corps, was stationed in Lincoln. Bishop's childhood was the peripatetic life of a military brat. He went to kindergarten in Tokyo, Japan, and he spent his senior year of high school in Seville, Spain. His parents divorced in 1951, and Bishop spent summers wherever his father happened to be based.

Bishop entered the University of Georgia in 1963, receiving his bachelor's degree in English in 1967, before going on to complete a master's degree in English in 1968. In 1969, he married Jeri Ellis Whitaker of Columbus, Georgia. He taught English (including a course in science fiction) at the United States Air Force Academy Preparatory School in Colorado Springs from 1968 to 1972. After his service career, he taught composition and English literature at the University of Georgia in Athens. A son, Jamie, was born in 1971, and a daughter, Stephanie was born in 1973. Bishop left teaching in 1974 to become a full-time writer. In those early years of freelance writing, he would occasionally work as a substitute teacher in the public schools and as a stringer for the Ledger-Enquirer in Columbus.

In 1996, Bishop became writer-in-residence at LaGrange College located near his home (built in the 1890s) in Pine Mountain, Georgia. Bishop taught creative-writing courses and an occasional January interim-term course. He held this position until Spring 2012.

In an interview in 2003, Bishop identified as a Christian.

Michael and Jeri, former counselor at Rosemont Elementary School, had two grandchildren, Annabel and Joel, by their daughter Stephanie. On April 16, 2007, their son Jamie, a lecturer in German and I.T. Studies, became one of the victims of the Virginia Tech shooting. Bishop and his wife subsequently advocated for stricter gun laws in the United States.

Bishop died from cancer at a hospice facility in LaGrange, Georgia, on November 13, 2023, one day after his 78th birthday.

== Writing career ==
Michael Bishop's first published professional fiction sale was the short story "Piñon Fall" to Galaxy Science Fiction in 1970. It was shortly followed by "If a Flower Could Eclipse", the first story in his Urban Nucleus (UrNu) cycle, Bishop's longest and most significant series of related stories. His shorter series, Glaktik Komm, in the subgenre of anthropological science fiction, consists of two short stories and two novels published in the late 1970s. While Galaxy Science Fiction and If magazines were publishing his science-fiction stories, the Magazine of Fantasy and Science Fiction became Bishop's venue for his fantasy/horror stories. This early period is also noted for a number of high-profile novellas: in 1973 "Death and Designation Among the Asadi" and "The White Otters of Childhood" appeared on the shortlist ballots for both the Hugo and Nebula awards. The 1974 gonzo novella "On the Street of the Serpents" (including a character named "Michael Bishop") first appeared in an anthology of original stories. It would eventually lead to a contract for his first novel from Ballantine Books, the anthology's publisher.

Bishop published fifteen solo novels, three collaborative novels, and more than 150 pieces of short fiction, most of which have been gathered into eleven collections. A major career retrospective collection, The Door Gunner and Other Perilous Flights of Fancy was published in February 2012 by Subterranean Press. His stories have appeared in such publications as Playboy, Alfred Hitchcock's Mystery Magazine, Ellery Queen's Mystery Magazine, Isaac Asimov's Science Fiction Magazine, the Magazine of Fantasy and Science Fiction, The Missouri Review, the Indiana Review, The Chattahoochee Review, The Georgia Review, Omni, and Interzone. His work has been translated into more than a dozen languages.

In addition to his fiction, Bishop published poetry (gathered in two collections) and won the 1979 Rhysling Award for his poem "For the Lady of a Physicist." He also had essays and reviews published in numerous newspapers and magazines, including The New York Times, The Washington Post, The Atlanta Journal-Constitution, the Columbus Ledger-Enquirer, Omni Magazine, and the New York Review of Science Fiction. A collection of his nonfiction, A Reverie for Mister Ray, was published in 2005 by PS Publishing.

Bishop and British author Ian Watson collaborated on a novel set in the universe of one of Bishop's earlier works. He also wrote two mystery novels with Paul Di Filippo, under the joint pseudonym Philip Lawson. Bishop's collaboration with Steven Utley, the short story "The City Quiet as Death", was published in June 2009 on Tor.com.

Bishop edited seven anthologies, including the Locus Award-winning Light Years and Dark and A Cross of Centuries: Twenty-five Imaginative Tales about the Christ, published by Thunder's Mouth Press in 2007. His latest anthology, Passing for Human, was co-edited with Steven Utley and published by PS Publishing in 2009.

Bishop wrote introductions to books by Philip K. Dick, Theodore Sturgeon, James Tiptree, Jr., Pamela Sargent, Gardner Dozois, Lucius Shepard, Mary Shelley, Andy Duncan, Paul Di Filippo, Bruce Holland Rogers, and Rhys Hughes.

Bishop was twice awarded the Nebula: in 1981 for "The Quickening" (Best Novelette) and in 1982 for No Enemy But Time (Best Novel). He also received four Locus Awards and his work has been nominated for numerous Hugo Awards. In July 2009, "The Pile" was the recipient of the Shirley Jackson Award for Best Short Story of 2008.

Bishop was Guest of Honor at more than a dozen science fiction conventions including the 1977 DeepSouthCon, the 1978 Philcon, the 1992 Readercon, the 1992 World Fantasy Convention, the 1999 World Horror Convention, the 2005 Norwescon, the 2009 Science Fiction Research Association Conference, and Special Guest at the 2010 ArmadilloCon. He was also one of the organizers of the three Slipstreaming in the Arts conferences (1997–2001). In 2001, he was given an Honorary Doctorate of Humanities from LaGrange College. In May 2013, he was the Guest of Honor at Italcon 39, the Italian national convention of fantastic literature.

== Overview of works ==
=== Early works ===
Six of Bishop's first eight novels are set on other worlds (the other two are the part of his UrNu sequence of stories.) Critic and author John Clute writes that "…his early stories and novels display considerable intellectual complexity, and do not shirk the downbeat implications of their anthropological treatment of aliens and alienating milieux…" In his major essay on these early novels, author Ian Watson writes "Michael Bishop is both an exoticist and a moralist. He is sometimes guilty, in the first respect, of a certain over-writing – underlying exotic venue by exotic diction – though the two become more organically integrated as his work progresses; and in the second respect of what one might call an over-scrupulousness on the part of his characters and his perceived attitude to them… These, however, are merely the consequence of aspiration and conscience; and as more of Bishop's work has appeared – and his reputation has grown – he has shown…a more coherent melding of exotic vision, ethics and style."

==== A Funeral for the Eyes of Fire ====
When Bishop's first novel, A Funeral for the Eyes of Fire, was published by Ballantine Books in 1975, critics Alexei and Cory Panshin wrote that the novel "shows an interest in the anthropological comparable to Ursula K. Le Guin and a sense of the alien comparable to James Tiptree, Jr. But it is an individual work, Bishop's own and no one else's. A Funeral for the Eyes of Fire is highly imperfect. It is a pied mirror, everywhere reflecting brilliantly bright, everywhere cloudy. It leads the eyes inward, and ultimately reveals nothing clearly. Even so, it is the most impressive first novel so far seen in the Seventies." They go on to declare that "Bishop is one of the new and still rare breed of science fiction writer attempting to produce art without rejecting the pulp vigor that is science fiction's continuing strengths." The novel was nominated for a Nebula Award in 1975.

==== And Strange at Ecbatan the Trees ====
Bishop's second novel (and first hardcover publication) takes its title from Archibald MacLeish's poem "You, Andrew Marvell". Published by Harper & Row in 1976, it is set in the same far future as his Hugo- and Nebula-nominated novella "The White Otters of Childhood." There are two surviving races, both genetically engineered by a third, the Parfects, who also manipulate the ongoing struggle between them. Richard A. Lupoff praised the novel lavishly, calling it "An eccentric, accomplished performance; and impressive and admirable one . . . a delightful book, a new treatment of a somewhat familiar theme, but crafted into a strange shape and told with such fineness of presence and such impressive language that it hardly matters what the book is about." Reviewer Keith L. Justice writes "If Bishop never published another word of fiction, he would still have to be considered a milestone writer in the development of contemporary sf… Writers such as Le Guin, Tiptree, and Bishop are developing a whole new generation of artistry."

==== Stolen Faces ====
In Stolen Faces (published by Harper & Row in 1977), a recently demoted commissioner has been reassigned to a colony planet to govern a compound which isolates the sufferers of a leprosy-like disease. Ian Watson writes that the novel is "about deceit, maskedness and discovery of self-truth…a harsh, arctic tale by contrast with [And Strange at Ecbatan the Trees] where the terrain may be stark but there is a mannered elegance in the tone of voice; it is a tale executed in an argot-ritualistic style." Critic Richard Delap writes "There is an abundance of exploitable elements in Bishop's story, so it is astonishing to see how the author keeps them under strict rein, always with a highly keyed visual sense but also with a literary flair that says more by implication than by direct description. The writing itself is crafted with a precision that becomes obvious only as the novel progresses."

==== Transfigurations ====
The Hugo- and Nebula-nominated novella "Death and Designation Among the Asadi" forms the first part of Transfigurations, a novel published in 1979 by Berkley Putnam. The story continues when the daughter of the anthropologist who studied the Asadi, a hominid-like race on the planet Bosk'veld, investigates his disappearance. In the journal Foundation, John Clute writes that the novel is "a fever of explanation. Hypothesis builds on hypothesis [as more and more data is added to the original observations], and much of the resulting construction is beautifully crafted, almost hallucinatory it is so plausible. But of course these explanations are never enough – and the intellectual tact by which Bishop makes them almost but not quite fit the data they are meant to make transparent is perhaps the strongest part of this extremely dense and carefully thought-through novel." Theodore Sturgeon writes "Michael Bishop's Transfigurations is as complex, as carefully thought-out, and as compelling an sf novel as you'll find anywhere, ever." Transfigurations was nominated for the British Science Fiction Association Award in 1980.

==== Eyes of Fire ====
In 1980, Bishop was given the unusual opportunity by editor David Hartwell to rewrite his first novel. This completely revised version (or, as Bishop called it, wholesale reimagining) was published by Pocket Books as Eyes of Fire. In his introduction to the British hardcover edition of the revised work, Bishop writes "…I still feel affection for the original version of A Funeral for the Eyes of Fire, its callow narrator, and a few of the flavorful images and metaphors with which I salted the text. But I also recognize the fumble-fingeredness and immaturity of that initial version." Very few publications (mostly fanzines) took enough notice to review the new version. (Pocket Books even used the artwork of the original publisher's edition.) In one of the rare reviews, Robert Frazier writes "In almost every detail, Eyes of Fire is crafted intelligently… It is not the type of sf that pushes to the heights of wonder. Instead it is a probing, disturbing, moving reflection on humanity… Bishop's skill is at plumbing to the depths, and his basic tool is a two-way glass. [Other novels this year] will have to go a long distance to surpass this effort."

==== Under Heaven's Bridge ====
When British author Ian Watson read Bishop's A Little Knowledge (1977), he was so fascinated with the alien Cygnusians that he wrote to inquire whether Bishop had plans to write a story about the aliens' home planet. Thus began what Bishop calls "the first ever transatlantic science fiction collaboration", with all correspondence sent by post. Although often labeled as the third book in the series, it is not truly part of the main UrNu sequence. In this novel, published in the UK by Gollancz (1981) and in the US by Ace Books (1982), a Japanese linguist, crewmember of the research starship Heavenbridge, arrives on the home planet of the Kybers (so-called because they're seemingly made of flesh and metal.) She soon learns that the planet's sun will shortly go nova. Brian Stableford writes that the novel when compared with other recent sf collaborations "is a very solid and rewarding piece of work. Its basic premise is original and intelligently worked-out, and the storyline sustains the fascination of the reader throughout. Nevertheless, it seems to me to fall slightly behind the standard set by recent solo works by either of the two authors." He concludes that the "book is worth reading, but it is not an outstanding work in either author's canon." This is Michael Bishop's last novel-length work of other worlds fiction.

=== UrNu (Urban Nucleus) cycle ===
With "If a Flower Could Eclipse" (1970), his second published story, Bishop began a series of stories set in the Urban Nucleus of Atlanta, one of several domed cities in his future history. Over the next decade he would write seven stories of varying length and one novel to fill in the century-long chronology. Some of the stories first appeared in such prestigious anthology series as Damon Knight's Orbit and Terry Carr's Universe. Four of the stories would subsequently be chosen for best-of-the-year anthologies. (N.B.: According to the author's website A Funeral for the Eyes of Fire and Under Heaven's Bridge are only tangentially connected to the series and thus not part of the sequence proper.)

In 2019, all of the works in this series, including two short stories, a novelette, four novellas, and a novel, were revised, sequenced, and published as The City and the Cygnets with an introduction by Kelly Robson, revised chronology and interstitial material, and a new afterword by the author.

==== A Little Knowledge ====
The only novel-length work in the UrNu sequence, A Little Knowledge, was published in 1977 by Berkley/Putnam. Chronologically, its events fall just before the last story in the series, "Death Rehearsals". The alien Cygnusians that first appeared in the novella "Allegiances" have been brought into the domed city of Atlanta, causing quite a stir when one of them converts to the state sponsored religion. Mary S. Weinkauf writes "…this is a cleverly done book with many elements of previously admired sf…although it is maneuvered by too carefully contrived coincidences and leaves some questions at the end… [It] is a book to think about long after you put it down." Richard Delap writes that "characters…scurry through this shifting maze as if they are buffeted by the social and political activities of this future world rather than by an author plotting to reach a predestined conclusion. A Little Knowledge is a lively, thought-provoking novel that will exercise your brain."

==== Catacomb Years ====
All of the previously published stories in Bishop's UrNu sequence, along with a new novella, "Death Rehearsals", are contained in Catacomb Years, a fix-up published in 1979 by Berkley/Putnam. Bishop also wrote new connecting material and provided a timeline.

=== Later novels ===
==== No Enemy But Time ====
Bishop's critically acclaimed novel, the Nebula Award winning No Enemy But Time, was published in 1982 by Simon & Schuster under David Hartwell's editorship and the Timescape imprint. John Clute writes that the novel "intensified the movement of [Bishop's] imagination to a local habitat, and for the first time introduced a protagonist of sufficient racial (and mental) complexity to carry a storyline immured in the particular and haunted by the exotic." In this sophisticated twist on the traditional time-travel story, a modern-day African-American man is recruited by the military for his special ability to "dream" himself into the Pleistocene era where he becomes involved with a tribe of habilines. Thomas Disch writes "Bishop is determined to write about human goodness without resorting to the mock heroics of formula adventure stories. There are no villains in the book, even among the habilines. The central and absorbing drama of the book is the hero's growing love for the habiline, Helen. Looming behind this love story is a larger theme, the formation across the entire span of history of the Family of Man, a phrase that becomes, as the novel ripens to its conclusion, no mere liberal piety but a fully realized dramatic affirmation." In one of the few mixed reviews, Tom Easton writes that "Kampa [the protagonist] is the only character who does come alive. All others are at least stiff. Some are outright caricatures. The book is not faultless, but it is overall a pleasure to read… Its treatment of anthropology is so effective that the few flaws are easily overlooked." Editor and critic David Pringle writes that the novel "is narrated in an oddly detached, quizzical and dryly humorous manner… The paleo-anthropological details are superbly imagined, the African landscapes beautifully described, yet the final effect is one of coolness, distance… Michael Bishop's prose style is learned, witty, Latinate, although salted with deliberately-placed colloquialisms and low jokes. This book is the work of a talented and serious writer." In addition to winning the Nebula Award, the novel was nominated for both the John W. Campbell Memorial and British Science Fiction Awards.

==== Who Made Stevie Crye? ====
Bishop followed-up his award-winning science fiction novel with a contemporary novel set in the rural American South. Mary Stevenson ("Stevie") Crye is a young widow with two children struggling to take care of her family as a freelance writer. Her typewriter has started to act up, automatically transcribing her nightmares and subsequently her future. The only American edition of Who Made Stevie Crye? was published in 1984 by the highly esteemed specialty publisher Arkham House under the editorship of Jim Turner. This original edition, as well as the British edition, was photographically illustrated by J. K. Potter. When David Pringle chose it for inclusion in his book Modern Fantasy: The 100 Best Novels, he described the novel as "a playful metafiction about the real and the fictitious, about the writer and his or her creation…" and concluded that the novel is "…a gripping and intelligent tale of the supernatural by an author who is adept at avoiding most of the clichés of the horror genre." In his mixed review of the novel, Joe Sanders writes "Sometimes vivid, sometimes prosaic; sometimes involving but often affectless, this is not a novel to like casually. Even when it looks like standard mass-produced pop lit, it actually is nudging us toward something more disturbing and hilarious than we're comfortable imagining. It finally is impressive enough to be uneasily recommended." Sanders' editor, Robert A. Collins, chides the reviewer with the footnote "Ignore Sanders' uneasiness, which obviously stems from his difficulty in pegging the book's genre; Stevie Crye is a marvelous book which transcends genre, as all the best of Bishop does." Author Ian Watson writes "Here is a humane, trickster kaleidoscope questioning a genre and a market, and fiction, and reality too – yet exquisitely spiced with human reality – and delivering the eerie chill of the occult and the illicit, curdling the blood but also warming the heart."

==== Ancient of Days ====
Bishop's 1983 Locus Award-winning novella "Her Habiline Husband" forms the first third of Ancient of Days, published in 1985 by Arbor House. It is the story of "Adam", one of the last surviving Homo habilis, who is discovered in contemporary Georgia. In this thematic companion to his novel No Enemy But Time (with an almost inverse conceit), Bishop tackles issues of racial and cultural prejudice, and explores the question of what it means to be human. Locus reviewer Debbie Notkin writes "This is science fiction so precise and so well-thought-out that it reads like history, although little history is so well-written, or cares so much about its characters." Bernard Goodman of Fantasy Review believes that "Bishop's theme of evil inherent in humanity echoes William Golding," and that the novel "in some ways…parallels Golding's Lord of the Flies." Author Samuel R. Delany writes "A wonder-filled novel of ideas—ideas that include questions of race, science, art, and spirituality, among many others. Bishop dramatizes each of these with a panache and a narrative energy that are a delight to read and dazzling to watch." Ancient of Days was nominated for the Arthur C. Clarke Award in 1988.

==== Philip K. Dick Is Dead, Alas ====
Originally published as The Secret Ascension by Tor Books in 1987 (but subsequently reprinted with the author's preferred title), this work is an homage to writer Philip K. Dick, a pastiche of his style, and includes an alternate reality version of Dick as a character. The novel is set in a world in which Richard Milrose Nixon, in his fourth term as president, holds fascistic control over America, and the science fiction works of Philip K. Dick remain unpublished, distributed underground as samizdat, while his realist fiction titles are the ones that are celebrated as masterpieces. Author and reviewer Orson Scott Card writes that "the climax is not just an inward epiphany for a character… [T]he world changes in wonderful strange ways, and the audience can read the book passionately, with sweating fingers, eager to see what happens next, yet reluctant to leave the present moment. Imagine: A writer who is already one of the best, taking risks and finding ways to be better." Card does take Bishop to task for the author's characterization of Richard Nixon, calling it a "caricature" and a "stock character of a madman." Locus reviewer Tom Whitmore calls the book "a masterful pastiche" and "…the closest thing to a classic Dick sf novel anyone has ever done." Gerald Jonas in The New York Times writes "Mr. Bishop is a solid, serious writer whose reach (in his previous work) has always seemed to me to exceed his grasp. Here, he catches some of Dick's fire, especially in the early chapters… Then a lot happens very quickly (as in some of Dick's own novels), and the satire, which should hold things together, turns predictable. But…the ending (starring Philip K. Dick) approaches sublimity." The novel was nominated for the Arthur C. Clarke Award in 1989.

==== Unicorn Mountain ====
In this novel, published by Arbor House/William Morrow in 1988, a man dying of AIDS is taken in by his cousin, a rancher in the Colorado mountains. An excerpt, "The Calling of Paisley Coldpony", was published in Asimov's Science Fiction in January 1988.

Nancy Kress wrote "Michael Bishop has pulled off a rare and amazing feat. Unicorn Mountain successfully weaves such traditional fantasy elements as unicorns and Indian lore together with the all-too-contemporary..." Orson Scott Card wrote "The triumph of this, Bishop's most artistically whole and successful novel to date, is that he set out to do something that is nearly impossible in fiction: He wrote a novel about constructing a tribe...To do it, he had to bring us to know and understand and care about more fully-created characters than most writers produce in a career." John Clute's assessment emphasized another theme of the work: "Michael Bishop, whose voice is like a shout from the bottom of the well of the enormous South, and whose heart is on his sleeve, [manages] in Unicorn Mountain to generate a moving tale out of ecological disaster here and in another world, AIDS, the death of cultures, the death of species, and the slow sea-changing of America into themeparks." The novel won the Mythopoeic Fantasy Award, and was shortlisted for the 1989 Locus Award.

==== Count Geiger's Blues ====
Xavier Thaxton, protagonist of Count Geiger's Blues: A Comedy (Tor Books, 1992), is the fine arts editor for a newspaper in the fictional Southern metropolis of Salonika (a satirical/alternate reality version of contemporary Atlanta) with a particularly low opinion of pop culture. When he is accidentally exposed to illegally dumped nuclear waste, the radiation exposure turns him into a superhero (or, as Bishop designated, a "stalwart"). Analog reviewer Tom Easton writes about the novel's resolution: "This is where Bishop falters. The satire he has painstakingly created now teeters on the brink of farce. He quite properly makes the decision to yank it back from that brink, but then he loses the satire. He becomes heavy-handed and obvious." Faren Miller disagrees: "The most ambitious comic books are no longer merely comic – may even incorporate tragedy in a critique of modern life as savage and acute, in its way, as the ferocious satire of Dante's Inferno. Count Geiger's Blues also goes beyond humor – well beyond, in its remarkable closing chapters. But they build on all that has gone before. In unleashing a startling talent for comedy and a wide-ranging knowledge of pop culture in both its absurdity and its splendor, Michael Bishop has written his best book yet." John Kessel writes "Comedy is certainly a new tone from Bishop, and he demonstrates a talent for it…But it seems to me Bishop doesn't really want to write comedy. It's as if Bishop is running riffs on whatever wacky ideas come to hand, without much plan, holding his characters at arm's length; as if, trying to avoid sententiousness, he has to avoid caring – but in the end can't. The result being a loose, baggy sort of book."

==== Joel-Brock the Brave and the Valorous Smalls ====
Bishop's first novel for young people "whatever their age" was published in June 2016 by the Fairwood Press imprint Kudzu Planet Productions. Ten-year-old Joel-Brock Lollis returns home from a baseball game to discover that his parents and sister have been kidnapped, and proceeds to recruit two employees of the local big-box department store in his quest to rescue his family. Reviewer Paul Di Filippo writes "Bishop's prodigious powers of invention serve him well here too. There are many angles to the tale, including an ongoing dialogue between Joel-Brock and his future self. The bulk of the book takes place in the Sporangium [the underground world beneath the department store], and there's always a new miracle or horror around the bend. While the marvels are unpredictable and chaotic, they also exhibit the consistency and inner logic of the best dream worlds."

=== Selected short fiction ===
In his introduction to an interview with Michael Bishop, in a reference to Bishop's short story collections, Nick Gevers writes "These volumes, combining the sublimely exotic and the drawlingly familiar, satirical humour and timeless tragedy, constitute one of the finest short fiction oeuvres in SF's history.". Author, critic and sometime collaborator, Paul Di Filippo writes

Since his first short-story sale in 1970, Michael Bishop has revealed a questing spiritual intelligence uniquely concerned with moral conundrums. While his works are often full of both the widescreen spectacles associated with science fiction and the subtle frissons typical of more earthbound fantasy, his focus remains on the engagement of characters with ethical quandaries any reader might encounter in his or her daily life. . . While only occasionally delving into explicitly religious themes, Bishop's personal Christian faith—wide enough to embrace references to Buddhism, Sufism and other creeds—shines through in every tale. . . Acknowledged as one of the genre's finest and most meticulous short-story writers, Bishop boasts six collections to date that function as treasure troves of both science fiction and fantasy. (A seventh lives up to its title, Emphatically Not SF, Almost, by hosting only mainstream tales.)

"The Quickening", Bishop's Nebula Award–winning novelette of 1981, is, according to Brian W. Aldiss and David Wingrove "…perhaps, a perfect modern fable. A fable about America and her values. For what is being torn down stone by stone is a world spoiled by the trite commercial values of American culture." It's the story of an ordinary American man who awakes to find himself in Seville, Spain. He soon discovers that the population of the whole world has been scattered, creating a potent stew of race, ethnicity, culture and language.

A major theme throughout much of Bishop's work (and especially so in his short fiction) is the role of religion in the daily lives of human beings. When several readers wrote letters of protest to Isaac Asimov's Science Fiction Magazine about its 1983 publication of Bishop's novella "The Gospel According to Gamaliel Crucis," Isaac Asimov himself wrote an editorial defending the work and the editor's decision to publish it. He wrote "…we had a remarkable story that considered, quite fearlessly, an important idea, and we felt that most readers would recognize its legitimacy – if not at once, then upon mature reflection."

When Bishop's story "Dogs' Lives" was reprinted in Best American Short Stories 1985, it became one of only a handful of genre stories to appear in the prestigious anthology series. The story might have languished in limbo, had the author not pulled its submission to Harlan Ellison's never-published anthology The Last Dangerous Visions.

== Bibliography ==
=== Novels ===
- A Funeral for the Eyes of Fire (1975) -- Nebula Award nominee, 1975
- And Strange at Ecbatan the Trees (1976) (later republished as Beneath the Shattered Moons)
- Stolen Faces (1977)
- A Little Knowledge (1977); the first book in the "Urban Nucleus" series
- Catacomb Years (1979) (fix-up); the second book in the "Urban Nucleus" series
- Transfigurations (1979) (expansion of novella "Death and Designation Among the Asadi") -- BSFA nominee, 1980
- Eyes of Fire (1980) (a complete revision of his first novel)
- Under Heaven's Bridge (1981, with Ian Watson)
- No Enemy But Time (1982) -- Nebula Award winner, BSFA nominee, 1982; Campbell Award nominee, 1983
- Who Made Stevie Crye? (1984)
- Ancient of Days (1985) -- Arthur C. Clarke Award nominee, 1988
- The Secret Ascension (1987) (later republished with the author's original title: Philip K Dick Is Dead, Alas) -- Arthur C. Clarke Award nominee, 1989
- Unicorn Mountain (1988) -- Mythopoeic Award winner, Locus Fantasy Award nominee, 1989
- Count Geiger's Blues (1992)
- Brittle Innings (1994) -- Locus Award winner, Campbell, World Fantasy and Hugo Awards nominee, 1995
- Joel-Brock the Brave and the Valorous Smalls (2016)

Will Keats series

1. Lawson, Philip (1998). Would it kill you to smile?. Atlanta: Longstreet.
2. — (2000). Muskrat courage.

=== Short fiction ===
==== Collections ====
- Blooded on Arachne (1982), includes the novellas "The White Otters of Childhood" and "On the Street of the Serpents", nine stories and two poems from 1970 to 1978
- One Winter in Eden (1984), includes twelve stories from 1978 to 1983 with an introduction by Thomas M. Disch
- Close Encounters With the Deity (1986), includes the novella "The Gospel According to Gamaliel Crucis" and thirteen stories from 1979 to 1986 with an introduction by Isaac Asimov
- Emphatically Not SF, Almost (1990), includes nine mainstream stories from 1982 to 1987
- At the City Limits of Fate (1996), includes fifteen stories from 1982 to 1996 -- Philip K. Dick Award nominee, 1996
- Blue Kansas Sky (2000), four novellas from 1973 to 2000, including the first publication of the title story
- Brighten to Incandescence: 17 Stories (2003), a compilation of previously uncollected stories from 1971 to 2003
- The Door Gunner and Other Perilous Flights of Fancy: A Michael Bishop Retrospective (2012), a collection of 25 stories and novellas from 1970 to 2009, 8 of which are previously uncollected
- Other Arms Reach Out to Me: Georgia Stories (2017), includes fifteen stories, mostly mainstream and uncollected, from 1982 to 2017; winner of the Georgia Author of the Year Award for short story collection
- The Sacerdotal Owl and Three Other Long Tales of Calamity, Pilgrimage, and Atonement (2018), includes three novellas from 1983 to 2012, and the short novel And Strange at Ecbatan the Trees (1976)
- The City and the Cygnets (2019), an omnibus publication of all of the works in the Urnu Sequence, originally published 1971–1979
- A Few Last Words for the Late Immortals (2021), includes 50 short stories and poems from 1971 to 2021, many of which were previously uncollected

==== Anthologies ====
- Changes (1983, with Ian Watson)
- Light Years and Dark (1984) (Locus Award winner)
- Nebula Awards 23 (1989)
- Nebula Awards 24 (1990)
- Nebula Awards 25 (1991)
- A Cross of Centuries (2007)
- Passing for Human (2009, with Steven Utley)

==== Notable stories ====
- "Death and Designation Among the Asadi (1973), novella (Hugo Award and Nebula Award nominee)
- "The White Otters of Childhood" (1973), novella (Hugo Award and Nebula Award nominee)
- "Cathadonian Odyssey" (1974) (Hugo Award nominee)
- "On the Street of the Serpents" (1974), novella (Nebula Award nominee)
- "Rogue Tomato" (1975) (Hugo Award nominee)
- "The Samurai and the Willows" (1976), novella (Locus Award winner; Hugo Award and Nebula Award nominee)
- "The House of Compassionate Sharers", novella (1977)
- "Old Folks at Home", novella (1978)
- "Within the Walls of Tyre" (1978), novelette (World Fantasy Award nominee)
- "Vernalfest Morning" (1978) (Nebula Award nominee)
- "Seasons of Belief" (1979) (dramatized on Tales from the Darkside)
- "Cold War Orphans" (1980), novella
- "The Quickening" (1981), novelette (Nebula Award winner)
- "The Gospel According to Gamaliel Crucis" (1983), novella (Nebula Award nominee)
- "Her Habiline Husband" (1983), novella (Locus Award winner and Nebula Award nominee)
- "The Monkey's Bride" (1983) (World Fantasy Award nominee)
- "Dogs' Lives" (1984) (reprinted in Best American Short Stories 1985)
- "A Gift from the GrayLanders" (1985), novelette (Hugo Award and Nebula Award nominee)
- "For Thus Do I Remember Carthage", novelette (1987)
- Apartheid, Superstrings, and Mordecai Thubana (1989), novella (World Fantasy Award nominee) (published as a chapbook)
- "The Ommatidium Miniatures" (1989) (Nebula Award nominee)
- "Life Regarded as a Jigsaw Puzzle of Highly Lustrous Cats" (1991) (finalist for the Nebula Award for Best Short Story)
- "Cri de Coeur" (1994), novella (Hugo Award nominee)
- "I, Iscariot" (1995), novelette (Theodore Sturgeon Award nominee)
- "Among the Handlers" (1996), novella
- "Sequel on Skorpiós" (1998)
- "Blue Kansas Sky" (2000), novella (World Fantasy Award nominee)
- "The Sacerdotal Owl" (2003), novelette
- "The Door Gunner" (2003), novelette (Southeastern Science Fiction Achievement Award winner)
- "The Road Leads Back" (2003)
- "Bears Discover Smut" (2005) (Southeastern Science Fiction Achievement Award winner and British Science Fiction Association award nominee)
- "Vinegar Peace; or, The Wrong-Way, Used-Adult Orphanage" (2008), novelette (Nebula Award nominee)
- "The Pile" (2008) (Shirley Jackson Award winner)
- "The City Quiet as Death" (2009, with Steven Utley)
- "Twenty Lights to 'The Land of Snow'" (2012), novella (Selected by Gardner Dozois for his "Best of the Year" annual anthology)
- "Rattlesnakes and Men" (2015)
- "Gale Strang" (2017), novelette Nebula Award nominee
- "Yahweh's Hour" (2021)

=== Poetry ===
==== Collections ====
- Windows and Mirrors (1977)
- Time Pieces (1998)

=== Non-fiction ===
- A Reverie for Mister Ray (2005)

== Interviews ==
- "The Prophetic World of Michael Bishop", The Atlanta Journal-Constitution Magazine, April 4, 1976: 8–10, 20 (interviewed by Phil Garner)
- "Michael Bishop: No Two Alike", Locus #335, December 1988: 1, 65-66 (interviewed by Charles N. Brown)
- "Interview with Michael Bishop", Science Fiction Review #1, Spring 1990: 42–43, 102 (interviewed by Elton Elliott)
- "Michael Bishop: Subduing the Serpent", Locus #426, July 1996: 4–5, 73-74 (interviewed by Charles N. Brown)
- "In Prayer the Whisper of the Void", October 2000 (interviewed by Nick Gevers, reprinted in The New York Review of Science Fiction #172, December 2002)
- "Michael Bishop: The Blessing and the Curse", Locus #526, November 2004: 8–9, 76-77 (interviewed by Charles N. Brown)
- An Interview with Michael Bishop (interviewed by Kilian Melloy)
- Teamwork: Bishop, Crowther, Hutchins et al. (interviewed by Sandy Auden)
- An Interview with Michael Bishop, June 2010 (interviewed by Francesco Troccoli)

== Adaptations ==
In 1993, 20th Century Fox optioned his novel Brittle Innings for a film and bought the rights outright in 1995. (To date, no film has been made.)
