= Kem Nunn =

American novelist

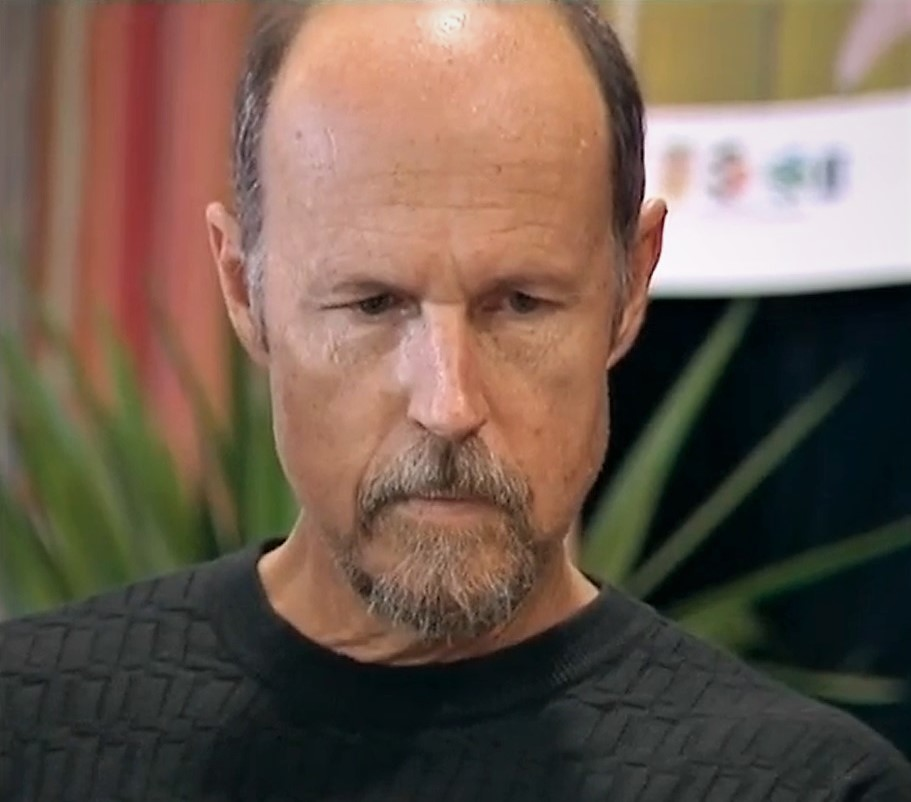
- Nunn at Étonnants Voyageurs festival in 2013
- Born: 1948 (age 77–78)
- Education: University of California, Irvine (MFA)
- Occupations: Novelist, Screenwriter
- Writing career
- Genre: Fiction
- Notable work: Tapping the Source

Kem Nunn (born 1948) is a third-generation Californian novelist, surfer, and magazine and television writer who lives in southern California. He has been described as "the inventor of surf-noir" for his novels' dark themes, political overtones, and surf settings. He is the author of six novels, including his 1984 seminal debut surf novel Tapping the Source, which was a finalist for the National Book Award. Tapping The Source inspired the 1991 movie Point Break, and its 2015 remake. Nunn's novel, Tijuana Straits, received a Los Angeles Times Book Prize.

Nunn collaborated with producer David Milch on the third and final season (2006) of the HBO Western drama series Deadwood. Milch and Nunn co-created the HBO series John from Cincinnati, a surfing series set in Imperial Beach, California, which premiered on June 10, 2007. Nunn also wrote for the last three seasons of the television drama series, Sons of Anarchy.

Nunn was a creator, executive producer, and head writer for the television series, Chance, with Hugh Laurie, directed by Lenny Abrahamson. Chance was based on Nunn's novel by the same name.

Nunn also spent time in the graduate programs in Creative Writing at Columbia and University of California, Irvine.

== Biography ==
Kem Nunn grew up in Pomona and Northern California. He has written the novels Tapping the Source, Dogs of Winter, Pomona Queen, Unassigned Territory, Tijuana Straits, and Chance. He received an MFA in creative writing from the University of California, Irvine.

Nunn joined the crew of the HBO western drama Deadwood as a writer for the third and final season in 2006. The series was created by David Milch and focused on a growing town in the American West. Nunn wrote the episode "Leviathan Smiles". He also wrote for season 5 of Sons of Anarchy.

== Bibliography ==
- Tapping the Source (1984) was a finalist for the National Book Award.
- Unassigned Territory (1986)
- Pomona Queen (1992)
- The Dogs of Winter (1997)
- Tijuana Straits (2004) received the Los Angeles Times book prize.
- Chance (2014), adapted for television as Chance
