= Gert Fram =

- Short story by Orson Scott Card
- Country: United States
- Language: English

Publication
- Published in: Ensign
- Publication type: Periodical
- Publisher: LDS Church
- Media type: Print (Magazine)
- Publication date: 1977

"Gert Fram" is a short story written by American author Orson Scott Card. It appears in his short story collection Maps in a Mirror, but it originally appeared in the July 1977 fine arts issue of Ensign magazine under the pen name Byron Walley. It is Card's first published work.

== Plot summary ==
A clumsy and imaginative thirteen-year-old girl named Susan Parker is having a very bad day. At school she pokes one of her classmates with a pencil and breaks her teacher's fishbowl. At home things get worse – she continues to make mistakes, knock things over and get into trouble. Although her parents are patient with Susan, she becomes convinced that they all hate her. Upset with herself, Susan begins writing a short novel called Susan the Jerk using her pen name Gert Fram. When Susan's father later goes to her room to talk to her, she lets him read Susan the Jerk. Realizing how badly she feels, her father tells her how much she is loved and that she is not a “jerk”. When Susan says that she is having a hard time believing this, her father begins to cry and she realizes how much he loves her. Feeling better, she gives her novel a happier ending and goes to bed.

== Byron Walley ==
In the Q&A section of his website, Card said that he published the short story "Gert Fram" under the name Byron Walley because he had a non-fiction article “Family Art”, a poem “Looking West” and a short play "The Rag Mission" (published under the name Brian Green) appearing in the same issue of Ensign magazine. He used the pseudonym to avoid appearing overrepresented in the single issue of the periodical.

Card used the pseudonym again while editing Dragons of Darkness, an anthology. He wanted to include two of his short stories: "A Plague of Butterflies" and "Middle Woman". Both stories appeared in the book, but "Middle Woman" was under the Walley pen name.

== Origins of Gert Fram ==
In his short story collection Maps in a Mirror, Card said that Gert Fram was the childhood pen name of his sister-in-law, Nancy Allen Black, and that while the idea for the story was his own, the character Gert Fram and all the "novels" she wrote (except Susan the Jerk) were created by his sister-in-law as a child.

== Relationship to Gert Fram by Nancy Allen Black ==
Card wrote that, although his short story "Gert Fram" was based on his sister-in-law Nancy Allen Black, her young adult book Gert Fram - A Kid's Book for Grown-ups (1991) ISBN 0-9624049-4-2 is not based on his short story but on her own childhood experiences.

== See also ==
- List of works by Orson Scott Card
