= Fat Farm =

- Short story by Orson Scott Card
- Country: United States
- Language: English
- Genres: Science fiction, horror

Publication
- Published in: Omni
- Publication type: Periodical
- Publisher: Omni Publications
- Media type: Print (Magazine)
- Publication date: 1980

"Fat Farm" is a short story by American writer Orson Scott Card. Originally published in the January 1980 issue of Omni magazine, it also appears in his short story collection Maps in a Mirror.

== Plot summary ==
Martin Barth is a very rich man with a serious overeating problem. When his obesity interferes with his enjoyment of his lifestyle, he goes to a secret clinic, gets himself cloned and then transfers his memories into the clone.

After Barth has legally transferred his identity to his replacement and it is too late to change his mind, he is told that he is now the property of the company that runs the clinic. His name is now "H", because he is the eighth "edition" of himself to go through the process, and H is the eighth letter of the alphabet. He has a choice: immediate death or "an assignment". Since he doesn't want to die he agrees to work for the company. He is dragged to a camp in the middle of nowhere and forced to do manual labor so that he will be in shape for the unspecified job they want him to do.

After two years, with only a brutal overseer for company, "H" is given his assignment. He leaves the camp, just in time to see his clone "I"—who is fat—dragged into the camp to begin the process over again.

As his plane is taking off, "H" thinks about how much he hates himself for repeating this process over and over again. He wishes that the newest clone would suffer even more than he had. After telling this to the businessman, who is his new supervisor, the young man laughs out loud. He explains that the overseer (or "old man" as "H" refers to him) is actually "A", the original.

== The comic ==
The short story "Fat Farm" was made into a comic which appears in the October 2005 issue of InterGalactic Medicine Show. The art for this comic was done by Jin Han and the script was written by Aaron Johnston, who also co-authored the novel Invasive Procedures with Card.

== See also ==
- List of works by Orson Scott Card
- Orson Scott Card
