= A Plague of Butterflies =

Short story by Orson Scott Card

- Short story by Orson Scott Card
- Country: United States
- Language: English
- Genre: Science fiction short story

Publication
- Published in: Amazing
- Publication type: Science fiction magazine
- Publisher: Ultimate Publishing
- Media type: Print (paperback)
- Publication date: 1981

Anthology edited by Card

"A Plague of Butterflies" is a short story by American writer Orson Scott Card. It was originally published in Amazing, in 1981, and shortly afterwards in an anthology, edited by Card, entitled Dragons of Darkness. His short story "Middle Woman" appeared in the same book under the pseudonym Byron Walley. A Plague of Butterflies was later reprinted in his short story collection Maps in a Mirror.

== Plot summary ==
This is the story of a man named Amasa. One day many butterflies came to Amasa to take him on a journey to Hierusalem – the land of the dead. On the way he met a man who told him the key to getting into the city. The man explains to Amasa that Hierusalem was built and sealed off from the rest of the world to keep an evil dragon from going out and killing people. The man also warns Amasa that if he kills a butterfly he will live forever. When Amasa arrives at the city he finds out that the people who live there expect him to kill the evil dragon and save the queen. Amasa says that he is done with quests and then kills a butterfly. Soon after that, the evil dragon goes to the queen and impregnates her. When the child is born, the butterflies tell Amasa to kill it but he cannot because the child is so beautiful. When it grows up, almost immediately, the dragon woman begins mating with Amasa creating many new dragons to send out into the world. Amasa tries to kill himself to stop her, but discovers that he cannot die.

== The comic ==
The short story "A Plague of Butterflies" was made into comic in which appears in the January 2008 issue of InterGalactic Medicine Show. The art for this comic was done by Lance Card and the script was written by Jake Black, who also worked with Card on the comic book mini-series Wyrms.

== See also ==
- List of works by Orson Scott Card
