= Keeper of Dreams =

2008 book by Orson Scott Card

- First edition
- Author: Orson Scott Card
- Language: English
- Publisher: Tor Books
- Publication date: 2008
- Publication place: United States
- Media type: Print (hardcover)
- Pages: 656
- ISBN: 0-7653-0497-X
- OCLC: 172979151
- Dewey Decimal: 813/.54 22
- LC Class: PS3553.A655 K44 2008

Keeper of Dreams (2008) is a short story collection by American writer Orson Scott Card. It contains twenty-two stories by Card which do not appear in his collection Maps in a Mirror. This collection was released on April 15, 2008.

== Story list ==
The short stories in this book are:

- "The Elephants of Poznan"
- "Atlantis"
- "Geriatric Ward"
- "Heal Thyself"
- "Space Boy"
- "Angles"
- "Vessel"
- "Dust"
- "Homeless in Hell"
- "In the Dragon's House"
- "Inventing Lovers on the Phone"
- "Waterbaby"
- "Keeper of Lost Dreams"
- "Missed"
- "50 WPM"
- "Feed the Baby of Love"
- "Grinning Man"
- "The Yazoo Queen"
- "Christmas at Helaman's House"
- "Neighbors"
- "God Plays Fair Once Too Often"
- "Worthy to Be One of Us"

== See also ==
- List of works by Orson Scott Card
- Orson Scott Card
