= An Open Book (poetry collection) =

2004 poetry collection by Orson Scott Card

- Author: Orson Scott Card
- Language: English
- Genre: Poetry
- Publisher: Subterranean Press
- Publication date: 2004
- Publication place: United States
- Media type: Print (Hardcover)
- Pages: 94 pp
- ISBN: 1-931081-93-X
- OCLC: 56352929

An Open Book (2004) is a collection of poems by Orson Scott Card.

== Contents ==
I - Hunger, Love, and Death

- Walking on Water
- Short-Lived Creatures
- Echo
- Grain of the Wood
- Of a Private History
- This Is the Poem I Made Then
- I Go Out the Door
- The Man Who Came Back from the Lunar Colony
- 5 a.m.
- Declaration
- Myrtle Beach
- Elves
- Light and Shade
- Rapunzel Summons the Prince
- In Touch
- My Son in Love
- Barbarians
- Browning, Cummings, Tennyson
- To One Not Poisoned Yet
- To Alice, Recently of Wonderland
- How Do You Know You Love Me?
- Lovers Do
- In Winter I Wrote Love Poems
- Hands
- Old House
- Old Mother
- Grandfather Is Home from Seattle
- He Died of Cystic Fibrosis at 24
- Prayer in the ICU
- Grandma in the Corner, Dying
- O Hurried Guest
- A Poem for Erin's First Christmas
- Worlds Might Stumble
- When
- Of My Beloved Son

II - Apocalyptic Verses

- Tin Men
- On Another Road
- If I Hadn't Overturned the Stone
- Dog and Bear
- Winter of Wishes
- Judge
- One Will Be Taken
- Broken Kings
- Hordes
- Outside the Ark
- Potion for Immortality
- From a Spirit to the One Possessed
- Warning to a Long-Haired Woman
- Redeemers
- Fire at the End of the World
- Point Most West
- No Snow White
- Mammon
- Needle

III - Wholly Writ

- Corn Is the Soil Song
- Last Supper
- Slight Bread
- If Jesus Wept
- Holy Moments
- John 4:14, 15
- Unremarkable They Grow
- Is Prophecy a Gift?
- Jacob Smith of Somerset
- Openings
- Thou Whose Hand Is Ever Light
- Deep Slow Illness
- All That the Earth Can Yield

== See also ==
- List of works by Orson Scott Card
- Orson Scott Card
