= Posing as People =

- Author: Orson Scott Card
- Language: English
- Publisher: Subterranean Press
- Publication date: 2005
- Publication place: United States
- Media type: Print (Hardcover)
- Pages: 204 pp
- ISBN: 1-59606-015-8
- OCLC: 59754959

Posing as People (2005) is a collection of three short stories by Orson Scott Card plus three plays by three different playwrights based on those stories.

== Contents ==
- "Clap Hands and Sing" - short story by Orson Scott Card
- "Clap Hands and Sing" - play by Scott Brick
- "Lifeloop" - short story by Orson Scott Card
- "Lifeloop" - play by Aaron Johnson
- "A Sepulchre of Songs" - short story by Orson Scott Card
- "A Sepulchre of Songs" - play by Emily Janice Card (Card's daughter)

== See also ==
- List of works by Orson Scott Card
- Orson Scott Card
