= Ainge =

1981 non-fiction book by Orson Scott Card

- Author: Orson Scott Card
- Language: English
- Genre: Non-fiction
- Publisher: Signature Books
- Publication date: 1981
- Publication place: United States
- Media type: Print, (hardcover and paperback)
- ISBN: 0-941214-02-8
- OCLC: 8562221
- Dewey Decimal: 796.32/3/0924 B 19
- LC Class: GV884.A35 C37 1982

Ainge (1981) is an out of print non-fiction book by author Orson Scott Card. It is a biography of star basketball player Danny Ainge. Two thousand copies were printed, distributed only in Provo, Utah, United States.

== See also ==
- List of works by Orson Scott Card
- Orson Scott Card
