= Cardography =

1987 book by Orson Scott Card

- Author: Orson Scott Card
- Cover artist: Leslie Comer
- Language: English
- Genre: Fantasy
- Publisher: Hypatia Press Ltd
- Publication date: 1987
- Publication place: United States
- Media type: Print (hardcover)
- ISBN: 0-940841-02-9
- OCLC: 16637641

Cardography (1987) is a short story collection by American writer Orson Scott Card. It contains five stories and an introduction by David G. Hartwell. All five of these stories were later published in Maps in a Mirror.

== Story list ==
The short stories in this book are:

- "The Bully and the Beast"
- "Middle Woman"
- "The Porcelain Salamander"
- "The Princess and the Bear"
- "Sandmagic"

== See also ==
- List of works by Orson Scott Card
- Orson Scott Card
