= Saints (Card novel) =

1984 novel by Orson Scott Card

- First edition (with original title)
- Author: Orson Scott Card
- Language: English
- Genre: Historical
- Publisher: Berkley
- Publication date: 1984
- Publication place: United States
- Media type: Print (Hardcover & Paperback)
- Pages: 720
- ISBN: 0-425-07002-6

Saints (1984) is a historical fiction novel by American writer Orson Scott Card. It tells the story of the fictional protagonist, Dinah Kirkham, a native of Manchester, England, who immigrates to the United States and becomes one of the plural wives of Joseph Smith, founder of the Latter Day Saint movement.

Saints was originally published as Woman Of Destiny, contrary to Card's wishes.

== Plot summary ==
The book opens up in 1829 with the desertion of the eight-year-old Dinah and her family by Dinah's father, John Kirkham. After enduring many of the horrors of Industrial Revolution England, Dinah's family begins to prosper. Dinah, her mother Anna, and her brother Charles, are converted to Mormonism. But Dinah's elder brother, Robert, as well as her husband, Matthew, do not convert, leading to a permanent schism in the family. The Mormon Kirkhams emigrate to Nauvoo, where the Mormons are building a city.

In Nauvoo, Dinah—who had to endure an unthinkable sacrifice to come to America—becomes the inspiration for the other women of Nauvoo. She is regarded by many as a Prophetess, and, despite not having the priesthood, bestows blessings on others. She also finds herself drawn to the prophet of the Latter Day Saint Church, Joseph Smith. He teaches her that her husband in England had proven himself unworthy of her by his rejection of the Gospel and by forcing her to choose between God and husband. Joseph introduces Dinah to the still-covert practice of plural marriage, and they are sealed for eternity as husband and wife. Forced to keep secret her eternal union to Joseph causes strains on her relationships with the other women of the town, particularly Emma Smith, Joseph's first wife.

After Joseph's death during his incarceration at Carthage, Dinah uses her influence to help Brigham Young emerge as the new Prophet of the Church, largely because he alone of the potential prophet candidates is determined to uphold the Principle (as plural marriage has come to be known among its adherents). During the Mormon Exodus to Utah, she agrees to become one of Young's wives, with the understanding that their marriage will never be consummated.

Dinah lives to the age of 100, not only outliving all her husbands, but also outlasting the practice of plural marriage, which the Church abandoned in 1890.

== "The Best Day" ==
In this novel Dinah Kirkham is supposed to have written a short story called "The Best Day". In addition to appearing in this novel, it was also published in Card's short story collection Maps in a Mirror (1990).

== Influences ==
As with many of Card's other literature, a Christian/Mormon influence is present in this book. However, Card explicitly wrote it to appeal equally to Mormon and non-Mormon influences; the book does not seek to proselytize, though it does discuss Mormonism at length.

Orson Scott Card is a descendant of Zina Diantha Huntington. Like the character of Dinah, Zina Huntington was born in 1821, converted to Mormonism and became a plural wife of Joseph Smith (who dissolved her marriage to her first husband). Also like Dinah, Zina Huntington next wed Brigham Young. Unlike Dinah, Zina was American (though Young did marry at least one English bride, Eliza Burgess) and her marriage to Young was consummated; her daughter with Young, also named Zina, was Card's great-grandmother.

== See also ==
- List of works by Orson Scott Card
- LDS fiction
