= Stone Tables =

1997 historical novel by Orson Scott Card

- Author: Orson Scott Card
- Language: English
- Genre: Historical
- Publisher: Deseret Book Co.
- Publication date: 1997
- Publication place: United States
- Media type: Print (Hardcover & Paperback)
- Pages: 432
- ISBN: 1-57345-115-0
- OCLC: 37418396
- Dewey Decimal: 813/.54 21
- LC Class: PS3553.A655 S86 1997

Stone Tables (1997) is a historical novel by American writer Orson Scott Card, based on the life of Moses, Aaron, and God's will. About the book, he said "My effort is to make sure that those who read this story emerge with an understanding of how good people struggle with each other and with their understanding of God's will as they try to make some decent use of their years of life". As with much of Card's other literature, a Christian/Mormon influence is present in this book.

== Adaptations ==
In 1973, Card, in conjunction with Robert Stoddard, wrote a musical adaptation of Stone Tables that was premiered and performed at Brigham Young University. On October 24, 2008, a revised edition of the musical was premiered at Southern Virginia University.

== See also ==
- List of works by Orson Scott Card
- The Women of Genesis series
- Hagiography, a biography of a saint or other spiritual leader
- Plagues of Egypt, which was mentioned in this book
- Parting of the Red Sea, also mentioned in the book
- Philo, who wrote On the Life of Moses
- Artapanus of Alexandria, a Jewish historian who wrote about Moses
- Biblical paraphrase
- Biblical apocrypha
- Horns of Moses, related to iconography of Moses, found especially in Christianity
