= Magic Mirror (book) =

1999 children's picture book by Orson Scott Card and illustrator Nathan Pinnock

- First edition
- Author: Orson Scott Card
- Cover artist: Nathan Pinnock
- Language: English
- Genre: Picture book
- Publisher: Gibbs Smith Publishers
- Publication date: 1999
- Publication place: United States
- Media type: Print (Hardcover)
- Pages: 32 pp
- ISBN: 0-87905-876-5
- OCLC: 41273039
- Dewey Decimal: 813/.54 21
- LC Class: PS3553.A655 M34 1999

Magic Mirror (1999) is an adult's picture book by Orson Scott Card and illustrator Nathan Pinnock.

== Plot introduction ==
Magic Mirror tells the story of a mythical family and their problems. Despite the family being depicted as a medieval royal lineage, their issues mirror contemporary concerns, and the illustrations include modern artifacts.

== See also ==
- List of works by Orson Scott Card
