= Homebody =

Homebody or Homebodies may refer to:

== Books ==
- Homebody (Card novel), 1988 horror novel by Orson Scott Card 1988
- Homebody (graphic novel), 2024 graphic memoir by Theo Parish
- Homebody, 1993 novel by Louise Titchener
- Homebody/Kabul, play by Tony Kushner
- Homebodies, 1954 book of illustrations by Charles Addams

== Film and TV ==
- Homebodies (film), horror comedy about pensioners against developers, 1974
- "Homebodies", season 4 episode of CSI: Crime Scene Investigation

== Music ==
- "Homebody", song by Bush from The Chemicals Between Us
- "Homebody", song by Zox from Take Me Home

== See also ==
- Recluse
