= A Storyteller in Zion =

Book by Orson Scott Card

- Author: Orson Scott Card
- Language: English
- Publisher: Bookcraft
- Publication date: 1993
- Publication place: United States
- Media type: Print (Hardcover)
- ISBN: 0-88494-894-3
- OCLC: 28830655
- Dewey Decimal: 289.3/32 20
- LC Class: BX8637 .C375 1993

A Storyteller in Zion (1993) is a collection of short stories and articles by Orson Scott Card. Card is a member of The Church of Jesus Christ of Latter-day Saints (LDS). Unlike much of his work, which is often science fiction, fantasy or similar fiction genres, A Storyteller in Zion is a collection of works which are of LDS themes.

For a number of years, Card worked as an editor for the official LDS magazine The Ensign and while in that position penned a number of articles for the periodical (and he also wrote some for the Church's young adult magazine, New Era). The stories are a mixture of fiction and non-fiction.

"Zion" in the title refers to the Church's use of the word to refer to the Lord's people or to the Church itself.

== See also ==
- List of works by Orson Scott Card
