= Prentice Alvin and the No-Good Plow =

Poem written by Orson Scott Card

- Short story by Orson Scott Card
- Country: United States
- Language: English
- Genre(s): Fantasy, alternate history

Publication
- Published in: Sunstone
- Publication type: Periodical
- Media type: Print (Magazine)
- Publication date: 1989
- Series: The Tales of Alvin Maker

"Prentice Alvin and the No-Good Plow" is a poem by Orson Scott Card. The poem was the basis for Card's The Tales of Alvin Maker series.

== Publication ==
"Prentice Alvin and the No-Good Plow" won first prize in the long serious poem category at the Utah State Institute of Fine Arts in 1981. Card published this poem in the August 1989 issue of Sunstone magazine; and reprinted it in his short story collection Maps in a Mirror.

== Plot summary ==
This poem is about Alvin Miller, a young blacksmith’s apprentice. One day, when there is not much work to do, the blacksmith tells Alvin to go into the woods to look for berries. In the woods, Alvin meets a red-winged bird that makes a "maker" out of him. When he goes back to the blacksmith’s shop he tries to make a horseshoe with the blacksmith’s help. However, he is unable to strike the metal with the hammer to bend it. Later, when he is alone, he follows the bird's instructions and magically makes a plow of gold. Putting the plow in a bag he sets off to find some soil that his plow can bring to life. At last Alvin comes to a river in the middle of a foggy land and takes his plow out of the bag. The fog begins to clear and he meets a man named Verily Cooper. Together they build a plow frame and when they touch it the plow comes to life and plows the ground.

== Characters ==
- Alvin Miller - main character
- The blacksmith - unnamed
- The red-winged bird - unnamed
- The living plow - made by Alvin
- Verily Cooper - a barrel maker
- Old Mizeray - a river
- Farmers - unnamed

== Origins of Prentice Alvin ==
According to Card he came up with the idea to write "Prentice Alvin and the No-Good Plow" while attending graduate school at the University of Utah. According to Card he decided to try to write an epic poem after reading The Faerie Queene by Edmund Spenser in one of his literature classes. At the time Card was not planning on expanding "Prentice Alvin and the No-Good Plow" into a novel series. It was originally meant to stand on its own.

== Awards ==
This poem won first prize for "long serious poem" in the 1981 Utah State Institute of Fine Arts. Card admits that all the entries in this category won a prize (there were two), though his came in first.

== See also ==
- List of works by Orson Scott Card
- Orson Scott Card
