= Hart's Hope =

1983 novel by Orson Scott Card

- First edition
- Author: Orson Scott Card
- Cover artist: Kinuko Y. Craft
- Language: English
- Genre: Fantasy
- Publisher: Berkley Publishing
- Publication date: 1983
- Publication place: United States
- Media type: Print (Hardcover & Paperback)
- Pages: 272
- ISBN: 0-425-05819-0
- OCLC: 9234808
- LC Class: CPB Box no. 2899 vol. 1

Hart's Hope (1983) is a fantasy novel by American writer Orson Scott Card.

== Setting ==
Hart's Hope takes place in a realm called Burland in the midst of its medieval ages. Like many fantasies, magic is a real and functional force in this story's world, but with a grisly twist: all magic, whatever its purpose, must be paid for in blood. The larger or stronger the animal, the more powerful its blood; a dead animal's blood is also weaker than that of one still living, meaning that a spellcaster has only limited time to work their magic before the stricken animal dies. Burland also has a unique writing and language system in which words and numbers, when read backwards, or in rows or columns, can form entirely different phrases and meanings (a fact which Burland's greatest writers deliberately exploit).

The story takes place primarily within Burland's capitol, a city once called "Hart's Hope" but eventually renamed Inwit. The city is notable for its multiple entrances, and the restrictions placed upon those who enter through those gates: a merchant who enters through the Asses' Gate is issued a pass which only allows him access to the commercial areas of the city, while a religious figure who enters through Gods' Gate can only visit the temples and so on. Beggars who enter through Piss Gate are granted a three-day pass during which to find work. And a certain gate, The Hole, has been specifically sealed off by the story's villain, so that nobody can enter through it save by magical or illicit means.

Finally, the people of Burland worship several deities. The Hart is strong in the affairs of men, while the Sweet Sisters, twins congenitally joined at the face so that one looks always inward and the other outward, are worshipped by women. A newly arrived (or newly created) god, simply named God and familiar to Judeo-Christian readers, is jealous of his worship and has been encouraging his followers to disbelieve the Hart and the Sisters.

== Synopsis ==
Hart's Hope begins by describing the state of Burland: ruled by tyrannical king Nasilee, damaged young princess Asineth, and bloody martial law. While all four gods dislike Nasilee, only the god named God takes action, by raising up the young Count of Traffing, Palicrovol, to overthrow the King. He is assisted by Zymas, Nasilee's former right-hand man and general. Palicrovol kills the king and, to cement his new rule, marries and publicly rapes the twelve-year-old Asineth. He then sends her away with his ally Sleeve, an albino wizard. He then sends for the Flower Princess, whose nearly unpronounceable name (Enziquelvinisensee Evelvenin) is rarely used and whose hand he secured during his bid for power; she is the most beautiful woman in the world, because she will never lie. These events are described by the narrator of the story, who is addressing Palicrovol directly and begging him to "no longer seek the death of the boy Orem"; despite the use of the pronoun I, the narrator's identity is withheld from the reader.

Unknown to Palicrovol, Asineth has conceived, and bears the child for a ten-month term—noted with consternation by a local priestess of the Sister. Sleeve, who being a man knows nothing about the customs of the Sisters, begins to research this phenomenon; unbeknownst to him, Asineth is duplicating his reading and, being a woman, understands a great deal more of it. She employs the most terrible sacrifice possible: her own daughter. Made immensely powerful by this hateful decision, she overthrows the gods and the city of Hart's Hope, setting Palicrovol in place as a humiliated (and continually tormented) puppet ruler. She steals the Flower Princess's face and body and keeps Sleeve, Zymas and the Flower Princess as her personal pets in altered forms, along with her collection of enslaved gods—the Hart a pile of bones beneath the castle, the god named God a blind slave scrubbing floors, and the Sweet Sisters sundered and sold out as whores. She renames herself Queen Beauty and rules with omnipotent power from the capital city, while all her toys—Palicrovol, Sleeve, Zymas and the Princess—are kept immortal for three hundred years.

But the gods still have some power, and they arrange for Palicrovol to father a bastard son with specific magical properties who will destroy Queen Beauty—a son named Orem, whose great power is that he is a "Sink", a person in whose presence magic has no power. He is also innocent and good, and is able to win over his mother's husband (though his mother prefers that he play outside, since she can't execute any of her household spells when he's nearby). Of course, since none of the strengthening spells make him any more muscular, he cannot join the military, and is instead passed on to the clergy. From there he travels to Inwit, where he spends a short time on the street before coming under the tutelage of the wizard Gallowglass, who teaches him to control his power. Shortly after a falling-out with Gallowglass, however, he is taken prisoner by the Queen's forces; but instead of executing him, she takes him to husband and, once again, conceives a child during the consummation.

Orem, now the "Little King" and exposed to the Queen's pets, begins his life as royal consort of Queen Beauty. He uses his power as a Sink to protect Palicrovol, who takes heart from this apparent weakening of the queen's power and begins to march on Inwit. He also discovers (by overhearing the Queen's Companions) that Queen Beauty has a plan to kill somebody to sustain her power; Orem assumes it is him, though he is warned by his friends not to begin to love the child he sired on the queen—a boy, named Youth, whom Orem nonetheless begins to father. Finally, when Youth is a year old, Queen Beauty launches her plan: to kill him as she did her first, unnamed daughter, as a sacrifice to enhance her power. Sleeve explains to Orem that this is in line with the plans laid by the Hart, Sisters and God: if Orem manages to hijack the ritual, Beauty will not only drink her own vitality from her son's blood, but Orem's Sink-ness, and destroy herself. Orem, grieving over his beloved son, does so, and Palicrovol enters the city triumphant and unopposed.

In the end, the narrator, revealed to be the restored Enziquelvinisensee, tells her husband in a letter she is writing for him that he must make the choice: will he kill young Orem for usurping, however briefly, his place on the throne? Or will he decide that enough blood has been shed needlessly for the city and his rule? The Princess's letter doesn't tell the reader, who must rely on their understanding of the characters to decide the ending.

== See also ==
- List of works by Orson Scott Card
