= Orson Scott Card bibliography =

The Orson Scott Card bibliography contains a list of works published by Orson Scott Card.

== Ender's Game ==
Title	Year	Series	Format	ISBN	Notes
Ender's Game	1985	Ender's Game	Novel	0-312-93208-1	Hugo Award winner, Locus Award SF nominee, 1986; Nebula Award winner, 1985; 1986 SF Chronicle Award winner
Speaker for the Dead	1986	Ender's Game	Novel	0-3129-3738-5	Hugo, and Locus SF Award winner, Campbell Award nominee, 1987; Nebula Award winner, 1986; 1987 SF Chronicle Award winner; 1989 Kurd Laßwitz Award (Foreign Work) winner
Ender's War	1991	Ender's Game	Collection		Omnibus of Ender's Game and Speaker for the Dead
"Gloriously Bright"	1991	Ender's Game	Short story		Published in the January 1991 issue of Analog Science Fiction and Fact. Reprinted as parts of Chapters 1, 3, 5, 7, 9, and 11 of Xenocide. It also includes about 20 paragraphs recounting Jane's story from Speaker for the Dead that are not republished anywhere else.
Xenocide	1991	Ender's Game	Novel	0-3128-5056-5	Hugo and Locus SF Awards nominee, 1992; 1994 Grand Prix de l'Imaginaire (Foreign Novel) Nominee
Children of the Mind	1996	Ender's Game	Novel	0-3128-5395-5	1997 Locus Award Nominee, 1999 Kurd Laßwitz Award (Foreign Work) Nominee, 2002 Seiun Award (Translated Long Work) Nominee
Ender's Shadow	1999	Shadow Saga	Novel	0-3128-6860-X	Parallel novel to Ender's Game. Locus SF Award nominee, 2000
Shadow of the Hegemon	2001	Shadow Saga	Novel	0-3128-7651-3	Locus SF nominee, 2002
Shadow Puppets	2002	Shadow Saga	Novel	0-7653-0017-6	
First Meetings	2002	Ender's Game	Collection	0-7653-0873-8	Short story collection
Shadow of the Giant	2005	Shadow Saga	Novel	0-3128-5758-6	
"Mazer in Prison"	2005	Ender's Game	Short story		Published online
"Pretty Boy"	2006	Ender's Game	Short story		Published online
"Cheater"	2006	Ender's Game	Short story		Published online
"A Young Man with Prospects"	2007	Ender's Game	Short story		Published online. Incorporated into Ender in Exile as chapter 5.
"The Gold Bug"	2007	Ender's Game	Short story		Published online. Included in Ender in Exile.
"Ender's Stocking"	2007	Ender's Game	Short story		Published online. The beginning of this story is included as chapter 2 in A War of Gifts: An Ender Story.
A War of Gifts: An Ender Story	2007	Ender's Game	Novel	0-7653-1282-4	
"Ender's Homecoming"	2008	Ender's Game	Short story		Published online. Included in Ender in Exile.
"Ender in Flight"	2008	Ender's Game	Short story		Published online. Included in Ender in Exile.
Ender in Exile	2008	Ender's Game	Novel	0-7653-0496-1	
Shadows in Flight	2012	Shadow Saga	Novel	0-7653-3200-0	
Earth Unaware	2012	Formic Wars	Novel	0-7653-2904-2	1st book of the 1st Formic Wars trilogy – with Aaron Johnston
Earth Afire	2013	Formic Wars	Novel	0-7653-2905-0	2nd book of the 1st Formic Wars trilogy – with Aaron Johnston
Ender's Game Alive	2013		Audio play		Audiobook
Earth Awakens	2014	Formic Wars	Novel	0-7653-2906-9	3rd book of the 1st Formic Wars trilogy – with Aaron Johnston
The Swarm	2016	Formic Wars	Novel	0-7653-7562-1	1st book of the 2nd Formic Wars trilogy – with Aaron Johnston
Children of the Fleet	2017	Fleet School	Novel	0-7653-7704-7	
"Renegat"	2017	Fleet School	Short story		Published online in the "Uncle Orson on the Fly" blog. Later included in Infinite Stars anthology (2017)
"Governor Wiggin"	2017	Ender's Game	Short story		Published online in the "Uncle Orson on the Fly" blog. Later included in Ender's Way, a limited-edition collection of Ender-related short stories (2021)
"Messenger"	2018	Shadow Saga	Short story		Published online in the "Uncle Orson on the Fly" blog. Later included in Infinite Stars: Dark Frontiers anthology (2019)
The Hive	2019	Formic Wars	Novel	0-7653-7564-8	2nd book of the 2nd Formic Wars trilogy – with Aaron Johnston
The Last Shadow	2021	Shadow Saga	Novel	0-76530-495-3	
The Queens	Planned	Formic Wars	Novel		3rd book of the 2nd Formic Wars trilogy – with Aaron Johnston

== The Tales of Alvin Maker ==
Title	Year	Series	Format	ISBN	Notes
"Prentice Alvin and the No-Good Plow"	1989	Alvin Maker series	Poem		Poem that inspired the series. Available in Maps in a Mirror: The Short Fiction of Orson Scott Card
Seventh Son	1987	Alvin Maker series	Novel	0-312-93019-4	Locus Fantasy Winner, Hugo and World Fantasy Awards nominee, 1988; 1988 Mythopoeic Awards (Fantasy) winner;1989 Ditmar Award (International Fiction) winner
Red Prophet	1988	Alvin Maker series	Novel	0-312-93043-7	Locus Fantasy Award winner, Hugo Award nominee, 1989; Nebula Award nominee, 1988
Prentice Alvin	1989	Alvin Maker series	Novel	0-312-93141-7	Locus Fantasy Award winner, Hugo Award nominee, 1990; Nebula Award nominee, 1989
Alvin Journeyman	1995	Alvin Maker series	Novel	0-312-85053-0	Locus Fantasy Award winner, 1996
Heartfire	1998	Alvin Maker series	Novel	0-312-85054-9	Locus Fantasy Award nominee, 1999
"Grinning Man"	1998	Alvin Maker series	Short story	978-0765300355	Published in the anthology Legends: Short Novels by the Masters of Modern Fantasy
"The Yazoo Queen"	2003	Alvin Maker series	Short story	978-1435291133	Published in the anthology Legends II : Dragon, Sword, and King
"Alvin and the Apple Tree"	2014	Alvin Maker series	Short story		
The Crystal City	2003	Alvin Maker series	Novel	0-312-86483-3	
Master Alvin	2026	Alvin Maker series	Novel	978-0765300188	

== The Homecoming Saga ==
Title	Year	Series	Format	ISBN	Notes
The Memory of Earth	1992	Homecoming saga	Novel	0-312-93036-4	
The Call of Earth	1992	Homecoming saga	Novel	0-312-93037-2	
The Ships of Earth	1994	Homecoming saga	Novel	0-312-85659-8	
Earthfall	1995	Homecoming saga	Novel	0-312-93039-9	
Earthborn	1995	Homecoming saga	Novel	0-312-93040-2	

== Women of Genesis ==
Title	Year	Series	Format	ISBN	Notes
Sarah	2000	Women of Genesis	Novel	1-57008-994-9	
Rebekah	2001	Women of Genesis	Novel	1-57008-995-7	
Rachel and Leah	2004	Women of Genesis	Novel	1-57008-996-5	
The Wives of Israel	Planned	Women of Genesis	Novel		
The Sons of Rachel	Planned	Women of Genesis	Novel		

== Pastwatch series ==
Title	Year	Series	Format	ISBN	Notes
"Atlantis"	1992	Pastwatch series	Short story		Found in the collection Keeper of Dreams
Pastwatch: The Redemption of Christopher Columbus	1996	Pastwatch series	Novel	0-312-85058-1	
Pastwatch: The Flood	Planned	Pastwatch series	Novel		
Pastwatch: The Garden of Eden	Planned	Pastwatch series	Novel		

== Mithermages series ==
Title	Year	Series	Format	ISBN	Notes
"Sandmagic"	1979	Mithermages series	Short story		
"Stonefather"	2008	Mithermages series	Novella		
The Lost Gate	2011	Mithermages series	Novel	978-0765326577	
The Gate Thief	2013	Mithermages series	Novel	978-0765326584	
Gatefather	2015	Mithermages series	Novel	978-0765326591	

== Mayflower ==
Mayflower was a projected trilogy begun in 1994 by Orson Scott Card and Kathryn H. Kidd, but only one book in the trilogy was published. Kidd died in 2015.

Title	Year	Series	Format	ISBN	Notes
Lovelock	1994	Mayflower	Novel	0-312-85732-2	With Kathryn H. Kidd

== The Worthing series ==
Title	Year	Series	Format	ISBN	Notes
Capitol	1979	Worthing series	Collection		
Hot Sleep	1979	Worthing series	Novel	0-70888-063-0	
The Worthing Chronicle	1983	Worthing series	Novel		
The Worthing Saga	1990	Worthing series	Collection		

== The Empire series ==
Title	Year	Series	Format	ISBN	Notes
Empire	2006	Empire series	Novel	978-0-765-31611-0	
Shadow Complex	2009	Empire series	Video game		Bridges the two novels
Hidden Empire	2009	Empire series	Novel	978-0-7653-2004-9	

== Pathfinder series ==
Title	Year	Series	Format	ISBN	Notes
Pathfinder	2010	Pathfinder series	Novel	978-1-4169-9176-2	
Ruins	2012	Pathfinder series	Novel	978-1-4169-9177-9	
Visitors	2014	Pathfinder series	Novel	978-1-4169-9178-6	

== Laddertop series ==
Title	Year	Series	Format	ISBN	Notes
Laddertop: Volume 1	2011	Laddertop series	Graphic novel		With Emily Janice Card
Laddertop: Volume 2	2013	Laddertop series	Graphic novel		With Emily Janice Card
Laddertop: Volume 3	2022	Laddertop series	Audiobook		With Emily Janice Card

== Side Step series ==
Title	Year	Series	Format	ISBN	Notes
Wakers	2022	Side Step series	Novel	978-1-4814-9619-3	
Reawakening	2025	Side Step series	Novel	978-1481496223	

== Micropowers series ==
Title	Year	Series	Format	ISBN	Notes
Lost and Found	2019		Novel	978-1982613419	
Duplex	2021		Novel	978-1799903178	

== Standalone novels ==
Title	Year	Series	Format	ISBN	Notes
A Planet Called Treason	1979		Novel	978-0312613952	1980 Locus Award Nominee
Songmaster	1980		Novel	0-8037-7711-6	1981 Locus Award Nominee
Hart's Hope	1983		Novel	0-425-05819-0	1984 Locus Award Nominee
Saints	1983		Novel	0-425-07002-6	Also known as Woman of Destiny 1984 AML Awards winner
Wyrms	1987		Novel	0-7653-0560-7	
Treason	1988		Novel	0-312-02304-9	Revised edition of A Planet Called Treason
The Folk of the Fringe	1989		Collection	0-7126-3637-4	1990 Locus Award Nominee
Lost Boys	1992		Novel	0-06-016693-2	A novel-length expansion of the short story of the same name. 1993 Locus Award Nominee
Treasure Box	1996		Novel	0-06-017654-7	
Stone Tables	1997		Novel	1-57345-115-0	
Homebody	1998		Novel	0-06-017655-5	
Enchantment	1999		Novel	0-345-41687-2	
Magic Street	2005		Novel	0-345-41689-9	
Invasive Procedures	2007		Novel	978-0765314246	With Aaron Johnston
A Town Divided by Christmas	2018		Novel	978-1538556856	

== Short story collections ==
Title	Year	Series	Format	ISBN	Notes
Unaccompanied Sonata and Other Stories	1980		Short story collection		1982 Locus Award Nominee
Cardography	1987		Short story collection		1988 Locus Award Nominee
Maps in a Mirror: The Short Fiction of Orson Scott Card	1990		Short story collection		1991 Locus Award winner
The Changed Man	1992		Short story collection		Part one of the four volume set of Maps in a Mirror
Flux	1992		Short story collection		Part two of the four volume set of Maps in a Mirror
Monkey Sonatas	1993		Short story collection		Part three of the four volume set of Maps in a Mirror
Cruel Miracles	1992		Short story collection		Part four of the four volume set of Maps in a Mirror
Waterbaby	2001		Short story collection		Published in Leading Edge
Doorways	2002		Short story collection		
Keeper of Dreams	2008		Short story collection		

== Anthologies edited by Card ==
Title	Year	Series	Format	ISBN	Notes
Dragons of Light	1980		Anthology		1981 Balrog Awards Nominee, 1981 Locus Award Nominee, 1981 World Fantasy Award Nominee
Dragons of Darkness	1981		Anthology		1982 Locus Award Nominee
Future on Fire	1991		Anthology		1992 Locus Award Nominee
Future on Ice	1998		Anthology		
Masterpieces	2001		Anthology		
The Phobos Science Fiction Anthology Volume 1	2002		Anthology		
The Phobos Science Fiction Anthology Volume 2	2003		Anthology		
The Phobos Science Fiction Anthology Volume 3	2004		Anthology		
Orson Scott Card's InterGalactic Medicine Show	2008		Anthology		Contains Ender saga webzine short stories

== Other works ==
Title	Year	Series	Format	ISBN	Notes
Notes from a Guardian Angel	1982				LDS fiction
Eye for Eye / Tunesmith	1990				Tor double novel with Lloyd Biggle, Jr.
Magic Mirror	1999				Children's book
Robota	2003				Illustrated book
An Open Book	2004				Collection of poems
Ultimate Iron Man	2005				Comic book series
Red Prophet: The Tales Of Alvin Maker	2006				Comic book series
Wyrms	2006				Comic book series
The Space Boy	2007		Novel		Young adult novel
Hamlet's Father	2011		Novella		

== Plays ==
Title	Year	Series	Format	ISBN	Notes
The Apostate	1970		Play		About the Book of Mormon character Alma. Performed at Brigham Young University Margetts Arena Theatre
In Flight	1970		Play		Performed at Brigham Young University Margetts Arena Theatre
Across Five Summers	1971		Play		Performed at Brigham Young University Theatre Workshop
Stone Tables	1971		Musical play		About Moses. Music by Robert Stoddard. Performed at Brigham Young University Pardoe Drama Theatre in 1971, Utah Valley Repertory Theatre Company in 1975, again at Brigham Young University Pardoe Drama Theatre in 1981, and Southern Virginia University in 2008. Novelized as Stone Tables by Card in 1997.
Father, Mother, Mother, and Mom	1974		Musical play		About pioneer-era Mormon polygamy. Music by Robbert Stoddard. Written in 1971, it had a staged reading at Brigham Young University, but administration rejected a full staging, apparently to avoid appearing to sanction modern polygamy. After some rewriting, Card staged a 1974 production at his own Utah Valley Repertory Theatre Company. There were also productions at the Green Briar Theatre in West Jordan in 1977. and Sundance in 1982. The script is found in Sunstone Magazine, 2.2, 1978.
Of Gideon	1974		Lyric Drama		Performed at Brigham Young University Margetts Arena Theatre
Liberty Jail	1975		Musical play		Music by C. Michael Perry. About Joseph Smith. Performed at the Utah Valley Repertory Theatre Company in 1975, Valley Center Theater in 1978, and Green Briar in 1979.
Abraham and Issac	1976		Opera		Scored by Murray Boren. Performed at Brigham Young University.
Rag Mission	1977		Play script		Mormon missionary story. Written under the pseudonym Brian Green. Appeared in the LDS magazine Ensign, July 1977.
Fresh Courage Take	1978		Play		About William Clayton. Performed at Green Briar.
Elders and Sisters	1979		Musical play		Based on a novel by Gladys Farmer. Music by Dallin Pack. Avenue Productions.
Wings	1982		Play		Partial production at Utah State Institute of Fine Arts.
Barefoot to Zion	1997		Musical		LDS Sesquicentennial Musical, about Mormon pioneers. Written with Kevin and Khaliel Kelly and music by Arlen Card. Card was brought in late in the process.
A Dixie Christmas Carol	2000		Play		Adapted from the Charles Dickens' classic
Posing as People	2004		Play		Three one-act plays based on short stories by Card
Clap Hands and Sing	2004		Play		One one-act play from Posing as People; adapted by Scott Brick
Lifeloop	2004		Play		One one-act play from Posing as People; adapted by Aaron Johnston
Sepulchre of Songs	2004		Play		One one-act play from Posing as People; adapted by Emily Janice Card
Taming of the Shrew	2007		Play		Translated and updated from Shakespeare
Merchant of Venice			Play		Adapted from Shakespeare
Romeo and Juliet			Play		Adapted from Shakespeare
Bubble Gum			Play		

== Non-fiction works ==
Title	Year	Series	Format	ISBN	Notes
Listen, Mom and Dad	1977	Non-fiction book			
Ainge	1981	Non-fiction book			
Saintspeak (1981)	1981	Non-fiction book			
A Storyteller in Zion	1993	Non-fiction book			

== Works based on other media ==
Title	Year	Series	Format	ISBN	Notes
The Abyss	1989	Novelization		0-7126-3403-7	Novelization of the movie with James Cameron
Getting Lost	2006	Novelization			
Shelter	2007	Motion comic			Based on the I Am Legend movie chronology

== Books on writing ==
Title	Year	Series	Format	ISBN	Notes
Characters and Viewpoint	1988	On writing			
How to Write Science Fiction and Fantasy	1990	On writing			1991 Locus Award Nominee & Hugo Award winner
Complete Guide to Writing Science Fiction: Volume One First Contact	2007	On writing			

== Columns ==
Title	Year	Series	Format	ISBN	Notes
Creating Your Own Games on the VIC and 64	June 1984-	Column			For Ahoy!, a Commodore computer magazine
Civilization Watch		Column			Formerly known as War Watch or World Watch for the Rhinoceros Times, a former independent Greensboro, NC newspaper
Uncle Orson Reviews Everything		Column			For the Rhinoceros Times, a former independent Greensboro, NC newspaper
Hymns of the Heart		Column			For Meridian Magazine, an LDS online magazine
Windows Made Me This Way		Column			For Windows Sources, a computer magazine
Gameplay		Column			For Compute!, a home computer magazine

== Other projects ==
Title	Year	Series	Format	ISBN	Notes
Compute's Third Book of Atari (section)	1984		book section		Chapter 1, section 2, "Reading the Keyboard Codes"
The King is Born	1987	The Animated Stories from the New Testament	Direct-To-Video Series		Wrote the screenplay for "The King is Born" which is part of The Animated Stories from the New Testament which was released and produced by Nest Entertainement
Unaccompanied Sonata			Possible feature film		Optioned in 2014 by Chockstone Pictures and Opening Night Productions; Yaron Zilberman slated to write/direct
Alvin's World	Planned	Alvin Maker series	Video game		An MMORPG being developed for Windows by eGenesis
Extinct	2017		TV series		Post-apocalyptic science fiction television series directed by Ryan Little and written by Orson Scott Card and Aaron Johnston
Ender's Game	2013	Ender saga	Feature film		American military science fiction action film based on the novel of the same name
I Am Legend: Shelter	2007		online promotional film		Wrote the story for the short animated online film "Shelter" which was created as part of the movie's promotion
Advent Shadow	2006		Video game		Originally planned for April 2006, a video game developed for the Sony PSP by Majesco; canceled January 2006
Advent Rising	2005		Video game		A third-person shooter developed for Microsoft Windows and Xbox by GlyphX Inc.
Stories of Strength	2005	Ender saga	Anthology	1-4116-5503-6	Charity anthology
50 WPM	2002		Anthology	1-58182-252-9	Contribution to In the Shadow of the Wall, Vietnam Stories that Might Have Been, edited by Byron R. Tetrick.
How Tolkien Means	2001		Anthology	0-312-27536-6	A contribution to Meditations on Middle-earth, edited by Karen Haber, in which Card discusses Tolkien's aversion to modernist allegory.
The Great Snape Debate	2000		Children's book	0979233119	A flip book discussing theories on Severus Snape of the Harry Potter series
Feijoada (American Style)	1998		Anthology	1-57345-288-2	Contribution to Saints Well Seasoned, edited by Linda Hoffman Kimball.
NeoHunter	1996		Video game		Wrote story
The Dig	1995		Video game		Wrote dialogue
The Secret of Monkey Island	1990		Video game		Card wrote the insults for the insult swordfighting section

== Pen names ==
Over the years Orson Scott Card used at least seven pseudonyms. According to Card he used a pseudonym for "Gert Fram" because he already had three other works appearing in the same issue. He used the penname Byron Walley again in various other publications for LDS magazines such as the Friend and the New Era as well as the short story "Middle Woman" in Dragons of Darkness. Card used the names Frederick Bliss and P.Q. Gump when he wrote an overview of Mormon playwrights for the Spring 1976 issue of Sunstone magazine. According to Card he used these pseudonyms because the article included a brief reference to himself and his play "Stone Tables". He used the name Brian Green in the July 1977 fine arts issue of Ensign magazine. He used this name for his short play "The Rag Mission" because he had three other pieces appearing in the same issue. Card used the name Noam D. Pellume for his short story "Damn Fine Novel" which appeared in the October 1989 issue of The Green Pages.
