= Eye for Eye =

1987 short story by Orson Scott Card

- Short story by Orson Scott Card
- Country: United States
- Language: English
- Genre: Science fiction

Publication
- Published in: Asimov's Science Fiction
- Publication type: Periodical
- Media type: Print (Magazine)
- Publication date: 1987

Eye for Eye (1987) is a science fiction novella by Orson Scott Card.

Card originally submitted the story to Analog magazine, but it was rejected. It ultimately ran in the March 1987 issue of Asimov's Science Fiction magazine. In 1990 it appeared in Card's short story collection Maps in a Mirror and also as a Tor double novel, with The Tunesmith by Lloyd Biggle, Jr. It won the Hugo Award for Best Novella in 1988.

== Plot summary ==
Mick Winger has an unusual gift and with it has accidentally killed several people. When Mick gets angry at people, his power manifests itself by launching an attack upon them by giving them cancer, leukemia or related terminal illnesses. If made angry enough, his anger can outright kill the victim.

Mick was raised in an orphanage and along his journey to manhood unintentionally killed several people who mistreated him, as well as nearly everyone he loved, though nearly every occurrence was accidental. The only intentional murder he describes while growing up is being nearly molested in a Denny's bathroom. This is when he discovers the intensity of the attacks are greatly heightened when he's touching a target. When fifteen, he fled child custody and set out on his own.

When Mick becomes angry, he gets, as he describes it, "sparky." He can see sparks surrounding and enveloping him and then those sparks lashing out on the object of his anger. Unavoidably, those attacked by his "sparks" end up with terminal illnesses and soon die. The effect of his attack is much more pronounced if he is touching the victim.

Until he was a young man, Mick had no idea he was different from other children. He discovered he was different when describing "sparkiness" with other children, who had no idea what he was talking about.

Soon after setting out on his own, he encounters a young woman who not only knows about his gift, but who even seems to possess the same gift, although to a lesser extent. She however possesses the ability to "call," to influence Mick so that he unintentionally heads straight for her, as well as intense sexual attraction, which she describes as simple pheromones that all people have, except that people like Mick, due to a different biochemical makeup (though Mick doesn't understand this when it is first explained to him), is far more susceptible to these pheromones than a normal human being.

Eventually he is led back to his birth parents, who are members of a mysterious, secluded colony. Talking to his parents, who also possess his ability, he learns he is far more powerful than they or probably anyone else at the colony. Mick learns that what he sees as "sparks" his family only sees as dust; he even begins to realize that he can see when people are lying. After being brought to the village's Patriarch, Papa Lem, Mick learns the intent of the colony and how they operate. Mick then refuses to "spread his seed" with the daughter of Papa Lem and returns to his parents' house for the night. During the night, Mick is attacked by an agent of Papa Lem and others from the village. Mick ends up killing his father and setting fire to the village while at the same time learning new extents to his abilities.

After fleeing the village on foot, Mick runs into the girl he met when he first set out on his own. The assailants from the village quickly catch up with the duo and start firing at them. The woman, unbeknown to Mick, is shot in the back of the head just as they reach their allies. Mick pulls the girl from her wrecked car and puts all his "sparkiness" into her just before passing out.

Mick awakes in the lair of his new allies. Upon questioning, Mick learns that the girl is alive and that he had somehow healed her from the bullet wound. Mick is on his way to officially meet the young lady when the story abruptly ends.

== See also ==
- List of works by Orson Scott Card
