= Robota =

2003 book by Doug Chiang and Orson Scott Card

- First edition
- Author: Doug Chiang and Orson Scott Card
- Language: English
- Genre: Science fiction
- Publisher: Chronicle Books
- Publication date: 2003
- Publication place: United States
- Media type: Print (Hardcover)
- Pages: 208 pp
- ISBN: 0-8118-4041-7
- OCLC: 51984808
- Dewey Decimal: 813/.6 21
- LC Class: PS3603.H525 R63 2003

Robota (2003) is an illustrated book by Doug Chiang and Orson Scott Card about a mysterious fourth planet of the Solar System named Orpheus. In a time before the events of the book, an alien race known as the Olm came to Orpheus and warned the people, explaining that their planet will crash into Earth in several thousand years. The Olm gave humans very advanced technology and the ability to create robots with artificial intelligence. But over the centuries, entropy and mismanagement have taken their toll. The humans have reverted to a preindustrial existence in a world populated with chimerical beasts such as the saurian jodhpurs, relying on bio-sciences for whatever support they can derive. With their mysterious leader, Font Prime, silenced, the robots have fallen under the baneful influence of Kaantur-Set, who directs a program of human extermination. But the robots themselves are on the point of extinction, as their technologies of reproduction no longer work. In this dire end of times, the story follows the adventures of Caps, a human who wakes up inside a metal capsule with no memory of his past.

== Orpheus ==
Orpheus was the fourth planet in the Solar System, it was also the sixth largest. Its orbit intersected Earth's orbital path every 50 years. Rich in life, it gave rise to sophisticated human, animal and robot civilizations. About 2.1 billion years ago, after avoiding proto-Earth for countless years, these two planets inevitably collided. Orpheus was obliterated and the Earth shattered. Eventually, Orpheus's fragments coalesced to form Earth's moon, which stabilized our planet's erratic rotation and allowed life to germinate. Robota is the story of life before the collision and the conflict between animal life and the machines that sought to dominate them.

=== Kaantur's City ===
Kaantur's City was the home of Kaantur and the base of operation for his robots, the City levitates over ocean sinkholes hundreds of miles from shore. Measuring 9 miles in diameter, the City is protected by the peculiar qualities of the gravity wells that form the sinkholes. Thought to be over 800 years old, little is known about the City's original purpose or builders.

=== Mushroom City ===
The home of the last humans aided by the sentient jodhpurs and other species who have gained sapience over the generations. They act as a dwindling but firm resistance against the tyranny of Kaantur-Set and his followers. The Mushroom City is, as the name implies, composed of massive fungal structures, carved hollow, and appropriated as great dwelling places. It is here where Caps first meets others of his kind who inspire him to go on a mission to fight against Kaantur and find himself.

== The Olm ==
Orpheus was visited centuries ago by a cybernetic race called the Olm. The Olm found the world populated with humans possessed of a steam-age technology. The benevolent Olm made massive changes, seeding the world with their own kind, before they departed. A peaceful and productive alliance of robots and humans then reigned.

== Characters ==
- Caps - a human with partial amnesia. Doesn't remember any of his past, The main hero in the story.
- Juomes - is a yeti-like hunter-beast whose parents were killed by Kaantur-set. He possesses a cubing jewel, an object which allows creatures to gain sentience and enables their young to be born with this newfound intelligence.
- Rend - is a sentient monkey-like creature that acts as comic relief through the story. He appears to have much knowledge about Caps's past yet is unwilling to divulge details. He relies on his small size to escape from trouble.
- Beryl - is a young woman who, along with her unnamed younger sister, were raised from infancy by robots in Transept City, one of the major robot cities and the home of Font Prime. Beryl managed to escape the city but was unable to help her sister. Known as the eyes of the forest,
- Elyseo - an anomalous robot friend who represents a sect that will not harm humans.
- Kaantur-Set - general of the robot armies. His cunning and agility is matched only by his sadistic passion for big game hunting and he has planned to unleash a world-purging of carbon-based life. Kaantur-Set killed Juomes’ parents and took Juomes’ hand in order to obtain the last of the cubing jewels. The character's name sounds remarkably similar to a mathematical set of points called the Cantor set.
- Font Prime - is a mysterious entity whose body lies deep in Kaantur's City. At first, many believed that it was Font Prime who commanded the extermination of carbon-based life when it was really Kaantur. However, it is revealed that Font Prime is a benevolent being who was once human but gained synthesis with the robots and the very earth of the planet.

== Trailers and proposed projects ==
In 2002, Sparx Animation Studios in France produced a three-minute computer-animated video, it was followed by two other short films, one of which included a live character interacting with two animated robots. For some time, it was speculated that a feature film was being produced.

A video game adaptation was announced in early 2015 which would be produced by SiXiTS Studios and Doug Chiang Studios. Gameplay would have been akin to Infinity Blade.

The kickstarter was created but failed to raise enough funds in time.

== See also ==
- List of works by Orson Scott Card
- Orson Scott Card
