= Dragons of Light =

1980 anthology edited by Orson Scott Card

- Editor: Orson Scott Card
- Cover artist: Michael Whelan
- Language: English
- Genre: Fantasy
- Publisher: Ace Books
- Publication date: 1980
- Publication place: United States
- Media type: Print (Paperback)
- ISBN: 0-441-16660-1
- OCLC: 7773222
- Dewey Decimal: 813/.0876/0837 19
- LC Class: PS648.F3 D7
- Followed by: Dragons of Darkness

Dragons of Light (1980) is a fantasy anthology edited by American writer Orson Scott Card.

== Contents ==
- "The Ice Dragon" by George R. R. Martin (Illustrated by Alicia Austin)
- "The George Business" by Roger Zelazny (Illustrated by Geof Darrow)
- "One Winter in Eden" by Michael Bishop (Illustrated by Val Lakey Lindahn and John Lakey)
- "A Drama of Dragons" by Craig Shaw Gardner (Illustrated by Gini Shurtleff)
- "Silken Dragon" by Steven Edward McDonald (Illustrated by Ron Miller)
- "Dragon Lore" by Steve Rasnic Tem (Illustrated by Victoria Poyser)
- "Eagle Worm" by Jessica Amanda Salmonson (Illustrated by Glen Edwards)
- "The Dragon of Dunloon" by Arthur Dembling (Illustrated by Dileen Marsh)
- "If I Die Before I Wake" by Greg Bear, including illustrations
- "As Above, So Below" by John M. Ford (Illustrated by Judy King-Rieniets)
- "Cockfight" by Jane Yolen (Illustrated by Terri Windling)
- "From Bach to Broccoli" by Richard Kearns (Illustrated by Geof Darrow)
- "Dragon Touched" by Dave Smeds (Illustrated by Michael Hague)

== See also ==
- Dragons of Darkness
