= A Planet Called Treason =

1979 novel by Orson Scott Card

- First edition
- Author: Orson Scott Card
- Cover artist: Paul Stinson
- Genre: Science fiction
- Publisher: St. Martin's Press; Dell Publishing
- Publication date: 1979
- Media type: Print (hardcover & paperback)
- Pages: 256
- ISBN: 0-312-61395-4
- OCLC: 4667520
- Dewey Decimal: 813/.5/4
- LC Class: PZ4.C258 Pl PS3553.A655

Treason
- St Martins; paperback (March 1990)
- Author: Orson Scott Card
- Genre: Science fiction
- Publisher: St. Martin's Press
- Publication date: 1988
- Media type: Print (hardcover & paperback)
- Pages: 309
- ISBN: 0-312-92109-8

A Planet Called Treason is a 1979 science fiction novel by American writer Orson Scott Card. It is about a radical regenerative named Lanik who is banished from his kingdom and travels to different regions of the planet, discovering the powers of the people living there. It was originally published by St. Martin's Press and Dell Publishing Co. After being heavily revised, and growing roughly 50 pages longer, it was republished in 1988 by St. Martin's under the title Treason.

A Planet Called Treason was Card's second published novel-length science fiction story; the short story collection Capitol had been published in January; Hot Sleep was published in April.

== Plot summary ==
Lanik Mueller is the teenage prince of the Mueller clan, one of many clans descended from a group of elites and intellectuals exiled to Treason thousands of years previously after a failed revolt against the Republic. The Mueller clan has developed advanced genetic engineering, modifying their DNA so that they heal rapidly. The modification is imperfect and sometimes results in "radical regeneration" of extra limbs and internal organs. The Muellers secure radical regeneratives in pens so they can harvest those extra limbs and sell them to the Republic in return for iron. Treason lacks hard metals and, supposedly, acquiring sufficient iron in trade would enable the construction of a starship to escape exile. The Muellers instead fashion weapons and, being one of the few clans to have anything of value to trade, combined with their genetic enhancements, have conquered several neighbouring clans.

As Lanik reaches puberty, he grows breasts and ovaries, marking him as a radical regenerative. His father, the king, saves him from a lifetime in the pens by sending him into exile, but with a secret mission to investigate the Nkumai clan who have reportedly obtained large quantities of iron and started their own wars of conquest. Lanik disguises himself as a woman and infiltrates the Nkumai capital pretending to be an ambassador from the matriarchal Bird clan. He discovers that the Nkumai are descended from a physicist and have developed advanced theories, including faster-than-light travel, which they sell to the Republic for iron.

Lanik's deceit is uncovered and he is severely wounded while escaping the Nkumai. Nearly disembowelled, his radical healing not only saves him from death, but even causes an entire second body and head to start growing from his trailing intestines. Appalled, he cuts off his undeveloped doppleganger and crushes its head with a rock, leaving it for dead.

Lanik is captured by a group of slavers and thrown into solitary confinement in the dark hold of a ship. After several weeks, he emerges with several extra arms and legs and the ship's crew, terrified of this monster, strand him in the desert territory of the Schwartz clan. The Schwartzes are descended from a geologist and have learned to the manipulate matter at the atomic level, enabling them to restore Lanik's body to normal and heal him of his radical regeneration at the genetic level. The Schwartzes can also communicate with the planet itself and feel its pain whenever a living being is killed on its surface. The Schwartzes are therefore the ultimate pacifists and have removed all the iron and other hard metals to their uninhabitable (except for them) desert so that no other clan can use it to make weapons.

Lanik learns the skills of the Schwartz clan, and begins to feel the pain of the wars being waged by the Nkumai. He decides to return to his homeland to defend it from the better equipped Nkumai forces. Arriving home, Lanik is branded a traitor as the Nkumai army is being led by a man calling himself Lanik Mueller. Lanik tells his story, surmising that his doppleganger must have survived and be helping the Nkumai. Although his father believes him, his conniving younger brother takes the opportunity to stage a coup. Lanik flees with his father and girlfriend, Saranna, wounding his brother during their escape.

They take shelter in the forest of Ku Kuei, and manage to befriend the Ku Kuei clan. The Ku Kuei can manipulate time, choosing to move quickly or slowly through time at will. Lanik and the others stay with the Ku Kuei and learn this skill, but Lanik's father falls into depression at the loss of his kingdom and commits suicide. Saranna also loses hope and chooses to freeze herself in time like a statue. Lanik decides he still wants to savour life and so leaves the Ku Kuei.

Lanik discovers that the Anderson clan are infiltrating other clans and covertly taking power. Anderson was a politician and the leader of the original revolt against the Republic that saw them all exiled to Treason, and his descendants have learned to manipulate the minds and memories of others. Lanik's traitorous younger brother was rather an Anderson infiltrator: Lanik had never even had a brother, yet the Anderson's skills were strong enough to make everyone believe in a false reality.

To end the destruction being wreaked by the Anderson clan, Lanik uses the skills he acquired in Schwartz to sink Anderson's island under the sea, killing everyone on it. He then spends several years, from his perspective, in quick-time, travelling the world to find and kill the remaining Andersons. He also destroys the "Ambassador" machines that are used to trade with the Republic, freeing everyone from their destructive influence.

Lanik's final stop is his former home. He expects to face his illusory younger brother, but discovers that he actually killed his "brother" during the coup. Not being a real Mueller, with their rapid healing, the Anderson infiltrator had succumbed to his wounds. Instead, the Lanik doppleganger, who has learned the skills of the Andersons, sits on the throne, giving the illusion of being his own illusory younger brother. In reality, the Lanik doppleganger is a many-limbed monster still suffering from the effects of radical regeneration. Lanik heals his doppleganger, explains how he has freed Treason from both the Anderson's and the Republic, and leaves the doppleganger to rule in peace.

Lanik returns to Saranna, who is still frozen in time like a statue. He slows himself down to her time and they profess their love and desire to be together. When they return themselves to normal time, several hundred years have passed in the rest of the world. The two of them settle in a rural community, using their skills to care for the local people, and contemplate raising a family.

== See also ==
- List of works by Orson Scott Card
- "A Planet Named Shayol" by Cordwainer Smith
