= Pastwatch: The Redemption of Christopher Columbus =

1996 novel by Orson Scott Card

Pastwatch: the Redemption of Christopher Columbus
- Author: Orson Scott Card
- Language: English
- Series: Pastwatch series
- Genre: Science fiction
- Publisher: Tor Books
- Publication date: 1996
- Publication place: United States
- Media type: Print (hardback and paperback)
- Pages: 351
- ISBN: 0-312-85058-1
- OCLC: 33277574
- Dewey Decimal: 813/.54 20
- LC Class: PS3553.A655 P37 1996
- Followed by: Pastwatch: The Flood

Pastwatch: The Redemption of Christopher Columbus (1996) is a science fiction novel by American writer Orson Scott Card, the first in a proposed Pastwatch series. The book's focus is the life and activities of explorer Christopher Columbus. Much of the action deals with a group of scientists from the future who travel back to the 15th century in order to change the pattern of European contact with the Americas. These alternate with chapters describing Columbus' career and his efforts to obtain backing to his project of travelling across the ocean - much of which can be considered as historical fiction.

== Plot summary ==
Sometime in the future, humanity invents a series of machines to view past events. Tagiri is a researcher at Pastwatch, the organization in charge of those machines. Her special interest is in the colonization of the Caribbean and the life of Christopher Columbus. One day, she accidentally discovers that the machines may be used to send information backwards in time (meaning the past is not unalterable). Unsure about what to do with the knowledge she is nonetheless put in charge of a project to explore it along with her husband Hassan. They are eventually joined by their daughter Diko.

A parallel narrative tells of Columbus' efforts to secure financial and political backing for his voyage across the Atlantic. Tagiri and other researchers note that Columbus had always yearned for greatness but that as a young man he had been determined to head east in a new crusade to liberate the Holy Land and Constantinople from the Muslims, whose fall was a recent and painful event to Europeans of Columbus' generation. Columbus changed his mind and decided to head west across the Atlantic after he nearly drowned in a storm.

The mystery of exactly why Columbus changed his mind is solved by Diko. She uses a new and more visually sensitive version of the time viewer and discovers that after surviving the wreck, Columbus received a vision directing him to head west to convert the people who lived on a previous undiscovered continent. The researchers realize that the vision is actually a hologram sent back in time by people from an alternate timeline to influence the direction of Columbus' life.

Realizing that someone has already changed the timeline, they try to figure out what might have been different if Columbus had headed east, instead of west. The answer is provided by Hunahpu, an Amerindian researcher with Pastwatch. He argues that in the original timeline, the Europeans exhausted themselves in the anti-Muslim crusade propagated by Columbus, and meanwhile, across the ocean, the Tlaxcalan Empire of Central America grew powerful enough to invade the weakened Europe, subjecting the continent to a harsh regime of human sacrifice. Eventually, the Tlaxcalans underwent an Industrial Revolution and developed advanced weapons which enabled them to conquer the entire world, still without changing their bloodthirsty religion for what must have been an extended period. To undo that atrocity, the Pastwatch's counterparts from the original timeline sent the hologram back to direct Columbus, the greatest man of his era, to head west. The European conquest of the Americas thereby neutralized the threat but at the price of untold suffering for the Native Americans, trampled under the European conquest.

Tagiri and her team determine that they must change history so that neither timeline happens as it did. The urgency of doing so increases when it is revealed that Tagiri's world is an imminent accelerating ecological disaster, which threatens the very survival of humanity. Tagiri and the others reason that the ruthless plundering of the world's resources which led to the disaster was a continuation of the dynamic of ruthless European conquest of the Americas, and averting the one might avert the other as well. In any case, with the world on the brink of total disaster, there is little to lose in interfering with history and trying to change and improve it.

Tagiri's team use their machinery to send Diko; Hunahpu; and a Turkish researcher, named Kemal, back in time to change history. Hunahpu and Diko appear years before Columbus' voyage in Central America and the Caribbean respectively. They use genetically-engineered viruses to spread immunity to Old World diseases and work to strengthen Indian society for the coming European contact, including by spreading a pseudo-Christian religion among them and outlawing human sacrifice. Hunahpu helps accelerate the development of a Central American empire to rival European powers. When Columbus arrives, Kemal sinks his ships, stranding the explorer and his men in the Caribbean. After overcoming prejudice, Columbus learns to live with the indigenous people and becomes a powerful political leader among the natives of the Caribbean and eventually oversees a political union with the Central American empire.

Diko becomes Columbus' lover, and the two establish a strong, lasting, and loving relationship. After years of their knowing and trusting each other, Diko reveals to Columbus the truth about her origins and what she had done. When hearing about how his voyage of discovery would have led to the widespread killing and enslavement of the Indians, Columbus bursts out crying and thanks Diko for saving him from perpetrating such deeds.

By the 16th century, the people of Central America and the Caribbean send ships across the Atlantic to meet the Europeans on more equal footing. Neither Europeans nor Native Americans are in a position to conquer the other, and they embark on reasonably peaceful relations.

A postscript describes the future of the new timeline as a utopian one and how archeologists in the 1950s discovered the skull of Kemal and found within it a set of small metal plates, which contained a message from Tagiri and the Pastwatch program.

== Future books ==
According to Card at his Hatrack River website, a second and third book, Pastwatch: The Flood and Pastwatch: The Garden of Eden were planned:

I have several projects under contract that will be written, as I find time—my sci-fi time-travel treatments of Noah's flood and the Garden of Eden, for instance.

In a 1999 interview with CNN, Card confirmed that those stories would be part of a "Pastwatch series".

In 2010, Card stated in an interview that he would be writing a Pastwatch novel a year until the trilogy was completed. As of 2026, this has not occurred.

== Criticism ==
Mark Winfield wrote: "Card opens up vast vistas of a history which might have been, a history in which centuries of harsh oppression of Native Americans (followed by the mass enslavement of blacks) might have been averted and more equitable relations between the two sides of the Atlantic established. (...) I am no expert on Mesoamerican history and culture. The alterations introduced in Western Hemisphere by the travelers from the future seem to me reasonably plausible, given the resources at these travelers' disposal - though an expert might pick holes in Card's scenario.(...) However, the final chapters, dealing with Columbus' belated return to Spain, seem in my humble opinion hopelessly idealistic.(...) The humane religion cooked up in the Caribbean by the time travelers could be considered a form of Christianity. But it is certainly not the Christianity practiced by the Catholic Church in 16th Century Europe. Which means that, from the Church's point of view, it is h-e-r-e-s-y, pure and simple. The 16th Century Catholic Church took a very dim view of heresy, the Spanish Church most of all. The Church established an institution charged with fighting heresy and stamping it out, the name of this institute: The Inquisition. (...) From the Church's point of view, the situation depicted by Card would inevitably be interpreted as "Columbus had become a heretic across the ocean, has come back with a heretic war fleet, and demands to establish on Spanish soil a heretic enclave where heresy could be openly practiced and from where it can be disseminated". Could the Spanish Crown have acceded smoothly and harmoniously to Columbus' request? Not likely. (...) Moreover, this is the very time when the Reformation was bubbling over in Germany. Inevitably, Columbus and his fellows would be regarded as the confederates of Luther. (...) This intervention from the future may have averted the European conquest of America, but it would not necessarily have created a peaceful and harmonious 16th Century. More likely, the European Wars of Religion would have gained a Transatlantic dimension."

A reviewer for Publishers Weekly commented: "Card (Ender's Game), who's won both a Hugo and a Nebula, gives the concept a new twist here-with mixed results."

== Translations ==
- French: "La Rédemption de Christophe Colomb", 1998, ISBN 2-84172-093-4
- Polish: "Badacze czasu. Odkupienie Krzysztofa Kolumba", 1997, ISBN 83-7180-706-6
- Russian: "Искупление Христофора Колумба", 1997, ISBN 5-300-01997-6
- Spanish: "La redención de Cristobal Colón", ISBN 84-406-8119-4
- Hungarian: "Múltfigyelõk: Kolumbusz Kristóf feloldozása", 2004, ISBN 963-9557-22-6
- Hebrew: "תצפית עבר: גאולתו של כריסטופר קולומבוס"
- Serbian: "Posmatrači prošlosti: Iskupljenje Kristofera Kolumba", 2007, ISBN 978-86-7662-058-6

== See also ==
- List of works by Orson Scott Card
- Orson Scott Card
