= Treasure Box =

1996 novel by Orson Scott Card

- First edition
- Author: Orson Scott Card
- Cover artist: Neal McPheeters
- Language: English
- Genre: Horror
- Publisher: HarperCollins
- Publication date: 1996
- Publication place: United States
- Media type: Print (Hardcover & Paperback)
- Pages: 310
- ISBN: 0-06-017654-7
- OCLC: 34514898
- Dewey Decimal: 813/.54 20
- LC Class: PS3553.A655 T75 1996

Treasure Box (1996) is a horror novel by American writer Orson Scott Card. It takes place in modern-day America.

== Plot introduction ==
The plot details a middle-aged man, Quentin Fears (pronounced "fierce"), who marries a woman who turns out to be from a strange family. The story unfolds as Quentin tries to stop a witch in the family from unleashing a great evil upon the world.

== Influences ==
As with many of Card's other literature, a Christian/Mormon influence is present in this book.

== Reception ==
Publishers Weekly complimented the plot and characters. Kirkus Reviews also cited strong characterization, but said the plot was neither realistic nor surprising.

== See also ==
- List of works by Orson Scott Card
- Orson Scott Card
