= Middle Woman =

- Short story by Orson Scott Card
- Country: United States
- Language: English

Publication
- Published in: Dragons of Darkness
- Publisher: Ace Books
- Media type: Print (Paperback)
- Publication date: 1981

"Middle Woman" is a short story by American writer Orson Scott Card, originally published in the Dragons of Darkness, edited by Card himself, under the name Byron Walley. It also appears in his short story collections Cardography and Maps in a Mirror.

== Plot summary ==
"Middle Woman" is the story of woman who at first seems very average. She is neither rich nor poor but somewhere in the middle. She is the middle child in her family and lives between her two sisters who live thirty leagues to the north and to south of her. One day while traveling to see one of her sisters she meets a dragon on the road. He tells her that he will either eat her or grant her three wishes. She decides to take the three wishes and then wishes that her husband's farm will produce enough food to support her family forever. The dragon flies to her house and eats her family so that no matter how much food the farm produces it will always be enough. Realizing that the dragon only wants to trick her, the woman wishes that everything in the world would go back to the way it was before she left her house that morning. Instantly she is back in her home and decides not to go see her sister so that she will not meet the dragon again. Although she is now safe, it occurs to the woman that she still has one wish. However, she wisely decides not to use it. Instead she saves it for a day when she needs it. When she is old and about to die the dragon comes to her and tells her that if she doesn't use the wish before she dies that he will die as well. The woman wishes that the dragon and everyone he meets will be happy and dies.

== Byron Walley ==
Byron Walley is one of Orson Scott Card's pseudonyms. Card chose to publish "Middle Woman" under the name Byron Walley because his short story "A Plague of Butterflies" was also appearing in the book Dragons of Darkness under his real name.

== Audio ==
In addition to the text versions of the story, "Middle Woman" is also available as an audio download in the March 2006 issue of Orson Scott Card's InterGalactic Medicine Show. The story was read by Mary Robinette Kowal and recorded at Willamette Radio Workshop.

== See also ==
- List of works by Orson Scott Card
