= Lost Boys (novel) =

1992 novel by Orson Scott Card

- First edition cover
- Author: Orson Scott Card
- Cover artist: Robert Crawford
- Language: English
- Genre: Horror
- Publisher: HarperCollins
- Publication date: 1992
- Publication place: United States
- Media type: Print (Hardcover & Paperback)
- Pages: 448
- ISBN: 0-06-016693-2
- OCLC: 26211240
- Dewey Decimal: 813/.54 20
- LC Class: PS3553.A655 L67 1992

Lost Boys (1992) is a horror novel by American author Orson Scott Card. The premise of the novel revolves around the daily lives of a Mormon family, and the challenges they face after a move to North Carolina. The story primarily follows the family's troubles at work, church, and the oldest child Stevie's difficulty fitting in at school, which lead to him becoming increasingly withdrawn.

Dealing with themes such as religion and the nature of good and evil, the novel is an expansion of Card's short story "Lost Boys". The plot of the short story is similar to the plot of the novel but Card assumes the role of the protagonist, Fletcher, leading the story to appear autobiographical. After receiving criticism for the story being "offensive" and appropriating the grief of losing a child, Card put a disclaimer at the end of the short story and wrote the novel in the third-person. The novel received praise for its "easy and natural prose" and its genuine and uplifting themes. Eugene England criticized the novel for its theology and the manner in which it deals with "religious, theological, and moral issues", stating that Card is at his best when he writes science fiction; however, he admitted that Card is a good storyteller. The novel won the 1992 Association of Mormon Letters Award for Best Novel.

== Plot ==
The novel, set in 1983, revolves around Step Fletcher, a game programmer, who invented a fictional game for Atari 8-bit computers called Hacker Snack, and his family. Step, a devout Mormon, moves his pregnant wife DeAnne and their three children, including seven-year-old Stevie, from Indiana to Steuben, North Carolina, so he can start a new job as a technical writer. In addition to struggles at his new job with unpleasant and immoral bosses and coworkers, the Fletchers' new house is periodically invaded by hordes of different types of insects. Bappy, the elderly father of the owner of the rented house, is always ready to lend a hand with things. Step quits his job right before DeAnne gives birth to a baby with special needs.

After the move, Step's son Stevie becomes withdrawn, playing only with his imaginary friends in the garden and on his computer. They take him to a psychiatrist, who speculates that the family's religion could be causing Stevie's problems, offending Step. Step and DeAnne notice that the names of Stevie's imaginary friends are the same as the names of young boys who are disappearing. Stevie knows the boys' nicknames, which are not common knowledge. They notify the police, and a detective questions Stevie, concluding that a serial killer must exist for them to be all connected through Stevie.

Step notices that the video game that Stevie uses to play with his imaginary friends has graphics that are beyond anything that could actually run on the computer and discovers that the game has no cartridge. On the 22nd of December, Bappy arrives and fits the Christmas lights for them and lingers for quite some time while DeAnn and Step take their infant to the doctor. On Christmas Eve, Stevie brings his friends into the house to introduce them to his parents and to celebrate Christmas. Stevie reveals that now that he is like them, he can make them visible to others. He explained that after confronting Bappy's connection to the missing boys, Bappy murdered him and buried his body in the underspace below the house, which also contained the graves of the other boys. Step and DeAnne bid Stevie farewell. Bappy is arrested and charged with the murder of the boys. Years later, Robbie and Betsy regard their elder brother like a legend and the family waits to unite with their lost child once again in the afterlife.

== Themes and motifs ==
Robert Bird described Lost Boys as a postmodern detective fiction because it explores multiple realities and aspects of the supernatural. Specifically, it deals with the ontological concerns of good and evil. The novel seeks to address what should be done when confronted with evil. Evil in the novel is described as supernatural and existing beyond the narrative as evident in the prologue which is also independent of the narrative. Throughout the novel, Step attempts to confront evil, suggesting that the most important way to confront evil is to "identify and name sin". Card uses Abinadi in the Book of Mormon as an example, explaining that it is better to die than knowing something bad is happening yet doing nothing about it. However, it is only the purity of Stevie that allows him to recognize the true evil in the novel in Steuben. Stevie sacrifices his life to identify it like Abinadi in the Book of Mormon and Stephen in the New Testament. This work portrays the Mormon theological belief about the eternal nature of evil, that it exists on its own, and portrays the struggle against it.

Other themes in the novel include what Michael Collings calls "The Epick of Mormonism". Card interweaves religion throughout the novel which plays a large part in the beliefs and morals of the family and the novel. More prominent than Mormonism is the theme of the American reality as the family lives in a world surrounded by deception, greed, and evil. The community to which the Fletchers belong does not uplift them, but hurts them, exemplified by a fanatical church member, a cruel elementary school teacher, a pedophilic coworker, and a serial killer landlord. It is only at the end of the novel that the Fletchers achieve the sense of community that they were seeking. Stevie is the vehicle for which Card mourns his own "lost boy", his son, yet also represents innocence and purity on a larger scale. Michael Collings argues that the ending of the novel transitions it from a "realistic" novel to a "mythopoeic" one.

Video games are common motifs found in Card's writing that often represent the complex, video game-like quality of life that needs to be navigated. In Lost Boys, Step Fletcher is a video game designer and a part of the novel's main plot revolves around Stevie playing a mysterious video game.

== Background and publication ==
Like many of Card's works, the novel is an expansion of a short story, his "Lost Boys", which can be found in his short story compilation Maps in a Mirror. According to Card, his original idea for the short story was inspired by Stephen King's Pet Sematary and his dislike of the novel's ending. He wanted to write a story in which the ghost child was not evil, but good. In the short story version, Card assumes Fletcher's role as the protagonist. Some minor plot details are different in this story, such as the protagonist's occupation (an editor for a video game magazine), and the story is told from a first-person perspective instead of the novel's third-person perspective. Though he refers to many real events, such as his writing of Ender's Game, the short story is also completely fictional. Because of his use of himself and his real occupation, real locations and real people, Card had to append a special note stating that the story is fictitious as he received criticism that his story was appropriating the grief of losing a child. However, the character Zap was inspired by Card's son with cerebral palsy. According to Gary Westfahl, Card's short story is "moving" but "deeply offensive" and the "epitome of Card's self-absorption".

His first mainstream horror novel, Card has stated that Lost Boys was one of his hardest to write due to the emotional nature of the subject material. It is widely regarded by those who have read it as some of his most intense, personal writing. It was published by HarperCollins in 1992.

== Reception ==
According to Publishers Weekly, "some readers may find the fantastic plot elements jarring, [but] Card's easy and natural prose goes a long way toward authenticating the supernatural intrusion". Kirkus Reviews called the novel, "affecting, genuine, poignant, uplifting". However, Eugene England stated that Card deals with "religious, theological, and moral issues" better in his science fiction novels than in his realistic novels such as Lost Boys. Furthermore, England stated that Lost Boys loses "the powerful edge of social criticism and utopianism that Card developed in the mid to late 1980s". England described the novel as, "domestic Mormon realism, with a touch of magical realism". He described the juxtaposition and struggle between the evil existent in the prelude and the rest of the novel and the sacrifice of Stevie as "Manicheistic" and that Bappy and Stevie together create a personal form of "independent and ultimately unredeemable existence". He concluded that though Card's theology may be poor, he is a great storyteller and understands "like Shakespeare and Milton, the power of redeeming love".

Lost Boys won the 1992 Association of Mormon Letters Award for Best Novel.

== Adaptations ==
Lost Boys was optioned by Mostow/Lieberman Productions in 2002 to produce a film directed by Brian Carr. However, Mostow/Lieberman Productions was disbanded in 2004.

Orson Scott Card has claimed that many elements of M. Night Shyamalan's The Sixth Sense were plagiarized from Lost Boys, although he has said that enough had been changed that there was no point in suing.

== See also ==
- List of works by Orson Scott Card
