= Songmaster =

1980 novel by Orson Scott Card

- Cover of the first edition
- Author: Orson Scott Card
- Cover artist: Lucinda Cowell
- Language: English
- Genre: Science fiction
- Publisher: Dial Press
- Publication date: 1980
- Publication place: United States
- Media type: Print (hardback & paperback)
- Pages: 338
- ISBN: 0-8037-7711-6
- OCLC: 6015866
- Dewey Decimal: 813/.54
- LC Class: PS3553.A655 S66

Songmaster (1980) is a science fiction novel by American writer Orson Scott Card. The story of the Songmaster occurs in a future human empire, and follows Ansset, a beautiful young boy whose perfect singing voice has the power of amplifying people's emotions, making him both a potential healer and destroyer. He is trained in the art of singing so beautifully that his songs can express ideas and emotions more truthfully than words. This novel was based on Card's short stories "Mikal's Songbird" and "Songhouse".

== Origins ==
The novel originated from a novelette, "Mikal's Songbird", which appeared in Analog Science Fiction in May 1978. The story concerns a young boy whose perfect singing voice had the power to amplify people's emotions. It is reprinted in Card's short story collection Maps in a Mirror. In addition to serving as the seed from which the novel was written, the original story is incorporated (with minor alterations) as the second section of the novel. Card published a prequel to "Mikal's Songbird," entitled "Songhouse", in the September 1979 issue of Analog, which explored Ansset's training by Esste before being turned over to Mikal.

== Plot summary ==
The empire of Songmaster is a place of treachery, resembling that of ancient Rome and the Galactic Empire of Isaac Asimov's Foundation series. The book is morally ambivalent. True love, both heterosexual and homosexual, are major themes as are loyalty and honor. Fraud, kidnapping, assassination, murder are also prevalent and each of them is shown in more than one light. As with many of Card's works, this story is more about the interplay of people, and their moral issues, than it is about technology, although the Empire clearly has advanced technology.

=== The Songbird ===
In the novel young boys and girls are selected for their singing ability and are removed from normal society to be raised as "Songbirds". They go through training and are given drugs to prevent puberty and sterilize. After training they are giving to wealthy aristocrats and held kept until they turn fifteen at which they are return to the Songhouse.

Ansset is seen as special and taken under the wing of Esste, a senior Songmaster. She takes him out into the real world, but only for a few days, a man remarking of the boy, "If he's willing to take off his clothes, he can make a fortune." Because of his talent, he is sent to the Emperor Mikal himself to sing. When he is aged 9, Riktors Ashen collects Ansset from the Songhouse and is captivated by his beauty, "the kind of face that melted men's hearts as readily as women's. More readily."

=== The theme of man/boy love ===
Ansset first experiences unwanted sexual attention in the form of a palace guard who searches him in preparation for his first meeting with Mikal. The guard suffers a steep price for lingering just a little too long, a harsh punishment swiftly dealt by Mikal on Ansset's word. Very soon after his induction into the palace and into Mikal's life, rumors circulate that surely, such a beautiful boy would have shared the emperor's bed. On a student group visitation to the palace, however, Kya-Kya, a former member of the Songhouse, silently debunks such rumors:

"They all wondered, of course, if a boy of such great beauty had found his way into Mikal's bed. Kya-Kya knew better. The Songhouse would never tolerate it. They would never send a Songbird to someone who would try such a thing." pg 130

A Songbird is only gifted to a person who has been judged to possess a soul capable of fully appreciating such beauty. A man or woman who would wish such great harm as sexual abuse would never be considered as a candidate for a Songbird. Ansset is loved by Mikal and loves him back, but neither Mikal, nor his successor Riktors, wish to have a sexual relationship with the boy.

Kya-Kya (Kyaren) is a girl a few years older than Ansset who leaves the Songhouse and works her way up to a senior position on Earth. Eventually she ends up working for Ansset when he is fifteen (though he still has the body of a 10-year-old). Kyaran has a boyfriend called Josif who is, in his own words, sixty two percent homosexual and the rest heterosexual. Josif was loved by a slightly older boy when he himself was a "shy child of unusual beauty".

Josif falls in love with Ansset the first time he meets him. He tries to avoid seeing the boy again, but this is impossible. As he slowly starts to mature, growing 17 centimetres, Ansset starts to seek out Josif's company more and more. Josif and Kyaren have a baby boy by now, but Ansset begins to realise that Josif is sexually attracted to him, as many people have been before. He recognises however, that Josif's love is different from the lust he has seen so often. Ansset starts to feel new longings. He knows that the drugs cause problems for Songbirds, particularly boys, but he has lost his songs and wants to know what happens next. Ansset eventually offers himself to the young man, saying, "I know what you want, and I'm willing". Josif lovingly brings the boy to his first climax. As Ansset experiences his first ever orgasm, he experiences enormous pain. The Songhouse drugs have almost killed him and he is forever impotent. Josif runs to find help and is captured by security forces, who take him to the palace at Susquehanna where Riktors has him drugged and castrated for his relations with Ansset. He then commits suicide by stuffing a bed sheet down his throat.

=== Conclusion ===
After many further developments, Ansset is back at the Songhouse, where he spends the remainder of his life.

== Author's commentary ==
Card, a Mormon and social conservative who has written a number of essays condemning homosexuality, responded to conservative criticism of his novel in an article "The Hypocrites of Homosexuality". He wrote:

What the novel offers is a treatment of characters who share, between them, a forbidden act that took place because of hunger on one side, compassion on the other, and genuine love and friendship on both parts. I was not trying to show that homosexuality was "beautiful" or "natural" -- in fact, sex of any kind is likely to be "beautiful" only to the participants, and it is hard to make a case for the naturalness of such an obviously counter-evolutionary trend as same-sex mating. Those issues were irrelevant. The friendship between Ansset and Josif was the beautiful and natural thing, even if it eventually led them on a mutually self-destructive path.

== Literary significance and criticism ==
The fantasy writer Alma Alexander characterised Songmaster as "Quite possibly Card's best published work, ever." The publisher characterised the story as "...a haunting story of power and love—the tale of the man who would destroy everything he loves to preserve humanity's peace, and the boy who might just sing the world away".

== Awards and nominations ==
As with some other Card novels (Ender's Game, for example), this book started out as a shorter story, "Mikal's Songbird", which was a Nebula Award finalist in 1978 and a Hugo Award finalist in 1979, both in the "novelette" category. Songmaster received the Hamilton-Brackett Memorial Award 1981.

== See also ==
- List of works by Orson Scott Card
