= Saintspeak =

1981 book by Orson Scott Card

- First edition
- Author: Orson Scott Card
- Language: English
- Publisher: Signature Books
- Publication date: 1981
- Publication place: United States
- Media type: Print (Paperback)
- ISBN: 0-941214-00-1
- OCLC: 8667702
- Dewey Decimal: 289.3/3 19
- LC Class: BX8637 .C37 1981

Saintspeak (1981) is a satirical look at the Church of Jesus Christ of Latter-day Saints by LDS author Orson Scott Card. It is modeled after The Devil's Dictionary by Ambrose Bierce. The pamphlet consists of a short glossary of common terms used by members of the LDS with humorous, satirical definitions.

Originally published in 1981, Saintspeak is currently out of print. It contains numerous references to the Equal Rights Amendment and the way missionaries gave lessons to LDS "Investigators".

The book is written in a light-hearted and pokes fun at the shortcomings and idiosyncrasies of Mormons. Frequent targets include hypocritical behavior by church members, the church's repression and denial of its history, and fanatics who take church doctrines a bit too far.

In the introduction, Card makes comments to placate anyone who takes offense too deeply by claiming that Ambrose Bierce appeared to him in a vision and presented the text of this book to him, paralleling the Angel Moroni appearing to Joseph Smith and telling him about the Golden plates that composed the Book of Mormon. Therefore, he is not responsible for anyone being offended by it because it is all Bierce's fault.

== See also ==
- List of works by Orson Scott Card
- Orson Scott Card
