= Magic Street =

2005 novel by Orson Scott Card

- First edition
- Author: Orson Scott Card
- Cover artist: David Stevenson
- Language: English
- Genre: Fantasy
- Publisher: Del Rey
- Publication date: 2005
- Publication place: United States
- Media type: Print (Hardcover & Paperback)
- Pages: 416
- ISBN: 0-345-41689-9
- OCLC: 57352830
- Dewey Decimal: 813/.54 22
- LC Class: PS3553.A655 M35 2005

Magic Street (2005) is an urban fantasy novel by American writer Orson Scott Card. This book follows the magical events in the Baldwin Hills section of contemporary Los Angeles, including the life of protagonist Mack Street, his foster brother Cecil Tucker, a trickster identified variously as Bag Man, Puck, Mr. Christmas, and numerous other members of this upscale community of African-Americans.

The storyline frequently refers to Shakespeare's A Midsummer Night's Dream and elements of Western and European folklore. In the author's note, Card credits friend Roland Bernard Brown with goading him into writing a novel featuring a black hero, and "thanks to Queen Latifah for putting (the Yolanda White character) on a motorcycle."

== See also ==
- List of works by Orson Scott Card
