= Rhino Times =

Conservative news website in North Carolina

The Rhino Times
- Type: Daily newspaper
- Format: Internet (Greensboro and Charlotte editions)
- Owner: Scott Yost
- Founder: John Hammer
- Founded: 1991
- Ceased publication: 2018 (print edition)
- Language: English
- Headquarters: Greensboro, North Carolina; United States
- Website: rhinotimes.com

The Rhino Times is a conservative news and opinion website covering Guilford County, North Carolina.

== History ==
John Hammer founded the website. In the mid-80s, Hammer worked the door of a bar in Greensboro called The Rhinoceros Club. One day the owner asked him to create a newsletter. One side would advertise bands coming to the bar, while Hammer could put whatever he wanted on the other side. Hammer produced the newsletter until 1986.

Hammer founded the print newspaper The Rhinoceros Times in 1991. Another print edition was founded in Charlotte, North Carolina in 2002 and discontinued in 2008.

The primary newspaper went into hundreds of thousands dollars of debt and ceased publication in 2013, but it was bought by local real estate developer Roy Carroll and reopened later that year. It ceased print publication again in 2018 and became an online-only newspaper. In June 2024, Hammer retired and Carroll sold the website to longtime editor/writer Scott Yost.

== Features ==
The newspaper features editorial columns by Greensboro-based science fiction and fantasy author Orson Scott Card and local investigative reporting by New York Times best-selling author Jerry Bledsoe.

The back page of the paper features a regular commentary article by editor John Hammer, "Under the Hammer". In the feature, Hammer is highly critical of President Barack Obama, referring almost exclusively to him as either "Barack Hussein Obama" or by his last name. Hammer also promotes conspiratorial and fringe theories that Obama is a "secret Muslim" and was not born in the United States.

== Controversies ==
=== Jyllands-Posten Muhammad cartoon ===
The newspaper published two of the controversial Jyllands-Posten Muhammad cartoons in February, 2006.

=== Ku Klux Klan ===
In July 2009, the paper won a $25,000 judgment for punitive damages against an Arkansas-based Ku Klux Klan group and its leader Thomas Robb. The case was filed in 2006 when the paper alleged the Klan inserted its fliers into Times newspapers, which then went to customers. The Klan counter-sued for defamation, but lost. In addition to punitive damages, the paper reportedly received the nation's first permanent injunction against the KKK, barring them from using the paper to distribute their literature in the future.

=== Prisoner cartoon ===
In June 2011, a controversy was created when the Rhino Times published a cartoon by Geof Brooks that featured two African American men in orange prison jumpsuits in the front yards of what appears to be two suburban homes. The first character states, "Geez! Dey builds a brand new jail wit' three squares [square meals] an' cable...", and the second character concludes, "And dey puts us on house arrest so's dey can pays for it!"

Editor John Hammer apologized in the next edition of the paper, claiming that the cartoonist had intended the prisoners to be caucasian; in his apology, Hammer did not address why the cartoon had been colorized as it was, nor the failure of the editors to catch the mistake. The Greensboro News & Record reported that Hammer called Guilford County Commissioners Chairman Melvin "Skip" Alston to apologize for the cartoon. Alston commented that he felt the cartoonist "might have had some racial intent".

=== Photography arrest story ===
In January 2015, Editor John Hammer published a story claiming two Irish tourists were accosted, mistreated, and arrested by Greensboro police while trying to take photos in the city's Bicentennial Garden. The story, including interviews with the couple and details of their arrest, was a fabrication. In response to controversy over the story, Hammer claimed the piece was intended as satire, though the publication did not in any way label it as such. In the next week's issue, Hammer apologized to readers for not marking the piece as satire and "to the police for maligning them."
