= Wyrms (comics) =

Publication information
- Publisher: Dabel Brothers Productions (1–5); Marvel Comics (4–6)
- Schedule: Monthly
- Format: Mini-series
- Publication date: April 2006–2007
- No. of issues: 6

Creative team
- Created by: Orson Scott Card
- Written by: Orson Scott Card & Jake Black

Wyrms is a six-issue comic book mini-series by Orson Scott Card and Jake Black, based on the novel Wyrms by author Orson Scott Card. Publication started in April 2006 by Dabel Brothers Productions and was finished in February 2008 by Marvel Comics.

== Collections ==
The series has been collected into a trade paperback (ISBN 0-9764011-8-5).

== See also ==
- List of works by Orson Scott Card
