= Homebody (Card novel) =

1998 novel by Orson Scott Card

- First edition
- Author: Orson Scott Card
- Cover artist: Phil Hefferman
- Language: English
- Genre: Horror
- Publisher: HarperCollins
- Publication date: 1998
- Publication place: United States
- Media type: Print (Hardcover & Paperback)
- Pages: 304 (430 paperback)
- ISBN: 0-06-017655-5
- OCLC: 37499955
- Dewey Decimal: 813/.54 21
- LC Class: PS3553.A655 H66 1998

Homebody (1998) is a horror novel by American writer Orson Scott Card. It takes place in modern-day America.

== Plot introduction ==
Homebody is the story of Don Lark who moves into an old house and is forced to deal with the supernatural forces that live in it.

== Influences ==
As many of Card's other literature, a Christian/Mormon influence is present in this book.

== See also ==
- List of works by Orson Scott Card
- Orson Scott Card
