= Hamlet's Father =

2008 novella by Orson Scott Card

- First standalone edition
- Author: Orson Scott Card
- Cover artist: Tom Kidd
- Language: English
- Publisher: Subterranean Press
- Publication place: US
- Media type: Print
- Pages: 104

Hamlet's Father is a 2008 novella by Orson Scott Card, which retells William Shakespeare's Hamlet in modernist prose, and which makes several changes to the characters' motivations and backstory. It has drawn substantial criticism for its portrayal of King Hamlet as a pedophile who molested Laertes, Horatio, and Rosencrantz and Guildenstern, and the implication that this in turn made them homosexuals.

== Plot ==
The story largely follows the plot of Hamlet. Unlike the original, Hamlet is disconnected from his indifferent father. He does not envy Claudius as the new king, believing him to be a fine monarch, although he pines for the day when he can rule Denmark peacefully and without war. He grieves little after the death of Ophelia. Hamlet does not question death nor his faith, which is unshakable. He is presented as moral and unwavering, a stark contrast to the original Hamlet.

At the end of the story, it is revealed that King Hamlet was not killed by Claudius, as the king had led Hamlet to believe, but by Horatio in retaliation for the king having molested him as a young boy. It is also revealed that the King had molested Laertes, and Rosencrantz and Guildenstern. Hamlet is sent to Hell for the harm he's caused and will be with his father for eternity.

== Development and publication ==
Orson Scott Card has modernized other Shakespeare plays, including The Taming of the Shrew, The Merchant of Venice, and Romeo and Juliet, "so that modern audiences can understand them instantly and easily while still remaining [sic] all the flavor of blank verse in Elizabethan English."

In his foreword to the Hamlet's Father, Card says that he could never identify with Hamlet: "I have little interest in a dithering hero; nor am I much inspired by revenge plots." He wrote the story in response, and citing the potential backlash from rewriting Shakespeare, he says, "If you think it's blasphemous to fiddle with Shakespeare's work, then for heaven's sake don't read this story. I leave his version in shreds on the floor. But my body count is just as high, as long as you don't expect me to account for Rosencrantz and Guildenstern. I figure Tom Stoppard took care of them for all time."

The story was originally published by Tor Books in the Marvin Kaye-edited anthology Ghost Quartet, an anthology of ghost stories. Hamlet's Father was reprinted in 2011 by Subterranean Press, a run of only one thousand signed books. The reprint generated some controversy for the publisher for the book's allegedly homophobic themes, prompting a reply from Subterranean Press' publisher.

== Reception and controversy ==
It wasn't until Hamlet's Father was reprinted by Subterranean Press that the story gained its notoriety; there was little reaction to the story during its run in the Ghost Quartet. Publishers Weekly reviewed the book when it appeared, pointing out that the book's pacing made it feel like a draft for a longer story that fleshed out Hamlet's character, and that it focused on linking homosexuality to pedophilia.

A review by William Alexander of Rain Taxi brought the book more into the public eye. The review is generally negative, and asserts that Horatio, Laertes, Rosencrantz and Guildenstern were gay, and that it was King Hamlet's molestation of them as young children that "[turned] them all gay". Alexander cites a speech of Orson Scott Card on his views of homosexuality: Homosexuals aren't born homosexual, and that there is often an underlying history of sexual abuse. As a counterpoint to the "abuse" theory, the review supposes that the story's Hamlet was himself gay, citing his affection for Horatio, his lack of affection for Ophelia, and his suicidal impulse from his "hell-bound condition."

Numerous outlets began publishing reviews after the Rain Taxi article, including IO9, SF Site, and The Guardian, all commenting on the book's link between homosexuality and pedophilia.

After the Publishers Weekly piece, Card responded on his website Hatrack. In his response, he says that none of the characters were gay, that Hamlet's father was a "pedophile, period," and says that he would not make a link between pedophilia and homosexuality. He says that his position on being against gay marriage has caused the accusations that he is a homophobe, and points out that many of his characters in other books were gay, including in stories published in the 70s and 80s "when it was definitely not fashionable to write sympathetic gay characters in fiction aimed at the mainstream audience." Further, he states that his "vilification by the hate groups of the Left" has prompted him to write fewer gay characters in his stories, saying that, "no matter how I depict them, I will be accused of homophobia."

Independent of the Rain Taxi review and the ensuing fallout, David Soyka of SF Site says that Hamlet's Father could be good introductory reading for high school, although "schools might be uncomfortable with Card's take on Hamlet's classical Oedipal complex."
