= Invasive Procedures (novel) =

2007 novel by Orson Scott Card

- Author: Orson Scott Card
- Language: English
- Genre: Medical thriller
- Publisher: Tor Books
- Publication date: 2007
- Publication place: United States
- Media type: Print (Hardcover)
- Pages: 352
- ISBN: 0-7653-1424-X
- OCLC: 123912571
- Dewey Decimal: 813/.54 22
- LC Class: PS3553.A655 I58 2007

Invasive Procedures (2007) is a medical thriller by American writers Orson Scott Card and Aaron Johnston. This novel was based on the short story "Malpractice" by Card, which first appeared in the Analog magazine in 1977.

== Plot ==
George Galen, a brilliant geneticist and Nobel laureate and part of the Human Genome Project, comes to believe that he can guide humanity to a brighter future through genetic enhancement disappears from public view.

Galen takes his research underground, eventually devising a virus that can carry specific genes into human cells. This virus, which the government dubs V16, must be tailored to each patient. It can cure that patient of a genetic disorder - but it is quickly lethal to anyone else, inducing a serious rejection reaction as their body responds to its attempt to rewrite the host's DNA. Galen sends agents called Healers to collect DNA from possible patients. If their disorder is caused by a suitable (repairable) defect, he engineers a version of V16 which the healer administers, explaining to the patient and the patient's family how to avoid the hazards of infection.

Galen has larger plans, as well. These involve kidnapping five individuals, four of them homeless and one whom he mistakes for such. These are Byron (a lawyer, not actually homeless), Dolores, Hal (a violent alcoholic), and teenagers Jonathan and Nick. They also involve a talented cardiothoracic surgeon named Monica Owens and her son Wyatt. Galen's Healers kidnap this pair so that he can use threats against Wyatt to force Monica to do what he wants.

Some weeks earlier, Frank Hartman, a virologist and soldier, had received samples of a dangerous virus. Using the facilities at Fort Detrick, he devises a cure. This cure is also a virus, that can infiltrate a patient's cells and destroy V16. Upon discovering this cure, Hartman learns that his original samples came to the Defense Department from the BioHazard Agency (BHA) a branch of the government that handles biowarfare attacks. The BHA has been investigating the cult-like Healers and their work for some time. The BHA "borrows" Hartman and transports him to their Los Angeles facility to work on V16.

Galen intends to achieve a sort of immortality by creating five copies of himself from the homeless people he kidnapped. To create these people, Monica Owens will transplant organs from Galen into their bodies. These organs have been dosed with V16, engineered to rewrite the genetic codes of the patients into Galen's code. The organs also confer a kind of healing ability that Galen engineered into himself with earlier versions of his virus; this prevents the virus from killing them as it rewrites their genetic codes. The surgeries also involve implanted electronic chips that hold Galen's memories. When the V16 has finished rewriting the genetic code, it will activate the chip which will download Galen's personality over that of the original individual. If successful, this council of five will carry Galen's work worldwide.

== Reception ==
Publishers Weekly gave the book a positive review and called it "intriguing." while pointing out that it had a few surprises for a medical thriller.

On the other hand Kirkus Reviews suggested that the novel might best be suited for a screen play instead. They heavily critiqued the plot calling it "iffy" before going to state that the scientific elements were "shaky" and that the characters were "annoying" and "do stupid things at critical moments"

== See also ==
- List of works by Orson Scott Card
- Orson Scott Card
