= NeoHunter =

1996 video game

- Developer(s): Ronin Entertainment
- Publisher(s): Virgin Interactive
- Producer(s): Eric Hayashi
- Designer(s): Kalani Streicher; Edward Kilham
- Programmer(s): Edward Kilham
- Artist(s): Harrison Fong
- Writer(s): Orson Scott Card
- Composer(s): Holy Cow Music
- Platform(s): MS-DOS, Windows
- Release: NA: October 25, 1996; EU: 1996
- Genre(s): Action
- Mode(s): Single-player, multiplayer

NeoHunter is a video game developed by American studio Ronin Entertainment and published by Virgin Interactive for MS-DOS and Windows in 1996.

== Gameplay ==
NeoHunter is an action game with a cyberpunk theme and dialogue written by author Orson Scott Card.

== Reception ==
Next Generation reviewed the PC version of the game, rating it one star out of five, and stated that "This is an awful game. Look at the box, you might not think so. [...] But don't be fooled."
