= Maps in a Mirror =

1990 book by Orson Scott Card

- First edition
- Author: Orson Scott Card
- Cover artist: Carol Russo
- Language: English
- Genre: Science fiction, fantasy
- Publisher: Tor Books
- Publication date: 1990
- Publication place: United States
- Media type: Print (hardback & paperback)
- Pages: 675
- ISBN: 0-312-85047-6
- OCLC: 21759561
- Dewey Decimal: 813/.54 20
- LC Class: PS3553.A655 M37 1990

Maps in a Mirror (1990) is a collection of short stories by American writer Orson Scott Card. Like Card's novels, most of the stories have a science fiction or fantasy theme. Some of the stories, such as "Ender's Game", "Lost Boys", and "Mikal's Songbird" were later expanded into novels. Each of the smaller volumes that make up the larger collection as a whole are centered on a theme or genre. For instance, Volume 1, The Changed Man, reprints several of Card's horror stories. The collection won the Locus Award for Best Collection in 1991.

== Publication history ==
Most of the stories appearing in the book are reprints of stories which were first published in science fiction and fantasy periodicals.

The book has been published as a single large volume, as a two volume set and as a four volume set. However, only the single volume editions contain: Book 5: Lost Songs, The Hidden Stories.

=== Single volume ===
- Maps in a Mirror (1990) Tor Books ISBN 0-312-85047-6
- Maps in a Mirror (1991) Legend Books ISBN 0-7126-4854-2

=== Two volume set ===
- Maps in a Mirror Volume 1 (1992) Legend Books ISBN 0-09-988470-4
- Maps in a Mirror Volume 2 (1992) Legend Books ISBN 0-09-988480-1

=== Four volume set ===
- The Changed Man (1992) Tor Books ISBN 0-8125-3365-8
- Flux (1992) Tor Books ISBN 0-8125-1685-0
- Monkey Sonatas (1993) Tor Books ISBN 0-8125-2367-9
- Cruel Miracles (1992) Tor Books ISBN 0-8125-2304-0

== Story list ==
The short stories in this book are:

=== Book 1 – The Changed Man: Tales of Dread ===
In the one-volume editions, this section is titled "The Hanged Man: Tales of Dread".

- "Eumenides in the Fourth Floor Lavatory"
- "Quietus"
- "Deep Breathing Exercises"
- "Fat Farm"
- "Closing the Timelid"
- "Freeway Games"
- "A Sepulchre of Songs"
- "Prior Restraint"
- "The Changed Man and the King of Words"
- "Memories of My Head"
- "Lost Boys"

=== Book 2 – Flux: Tales of Human Futures ===
- "A Thousand Deaths"
- "Clap Hands and Sing"
- "Dogwalker"
- "But We Try Not to Act Like It"
- "I Put My Blue Genes On"
- "In the Doghouse"
- "The Originist"

=== Book 3 – Monkey Sonatas: Fables and Fantasies ===
In the one-volume editions, this section is titled "Maps in a Mirror: Fables and Fantasies".

- "Unaccompanied Sonata"
- "A Cross-Country Trip to Kill Richard Nixon"
- "The Porcelain Salamander"
- "Middle Woman"
- "The Bully and the Beast"
- "The Princess and the Bear"
- "Sandmagic"
- "The Best Day"
- "A Plague of Butterflies"
- "The Monkeys Thought 'Twas All in Fun", a short story that originally appeared the short story collections Unaccompanied Sonata and Other Stories (1980). A story is about how paradise can have its hidden pitfalls.

=== Book 4 – Cruel Miracles: Tales of Death, Hope, and Holiness ===
- "Mortal Gods"
- "Saving Grace"
- "Eye for Eye"
- "St. Amy's Tale"
- "Kingsmeat"
- "Holy"

=== Book 5 – Lost Songs: The Hidden Stories ===
- "Ender's Game"
- "Mikal's Songbird"
- "Prentice Alvin and the No-Good Plow"
- "Malpractice"
- "Follower"
- "Hitching"
- "Damn Fine Novel"
- "Billy's Box"
- "The Best Family Home Evening Ever"
- "Bicicleta"
- "I Think Mom and Dad Are Going Crazy, Jerry"
- "Gert Fram"

== See also ==
- Orson Scott Card bibliography
- Orson Scott Card
