= 2020 Seattle Film Critics Society Awards =

Annual US film awards ceremony

5th Seattle Film Critics Society Awards
- Date: February 15, 2021
- Site: Seattle, Washington

Highlights
- Best Picture: Nomadland
- Most awards: Nomadland (5)
- Most nominations: Minari (8)

The 5th Seattle Film Critics Society Awards were announced on February 15, 2021.

The nominations were announced on February 8, 2021.

== Winners and nominees ==
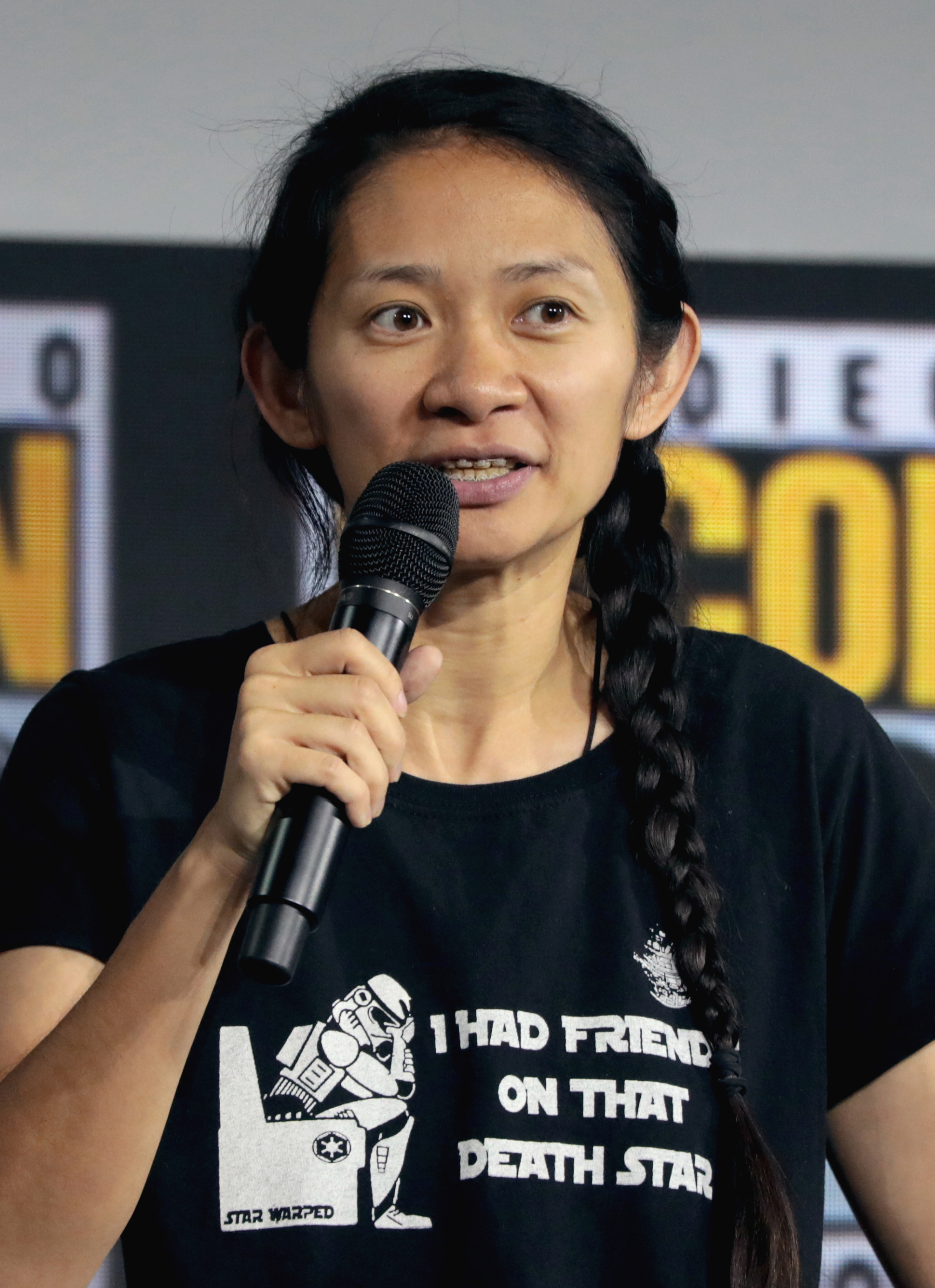
Chloé Zhao, Best Director and Best Film Editing winner

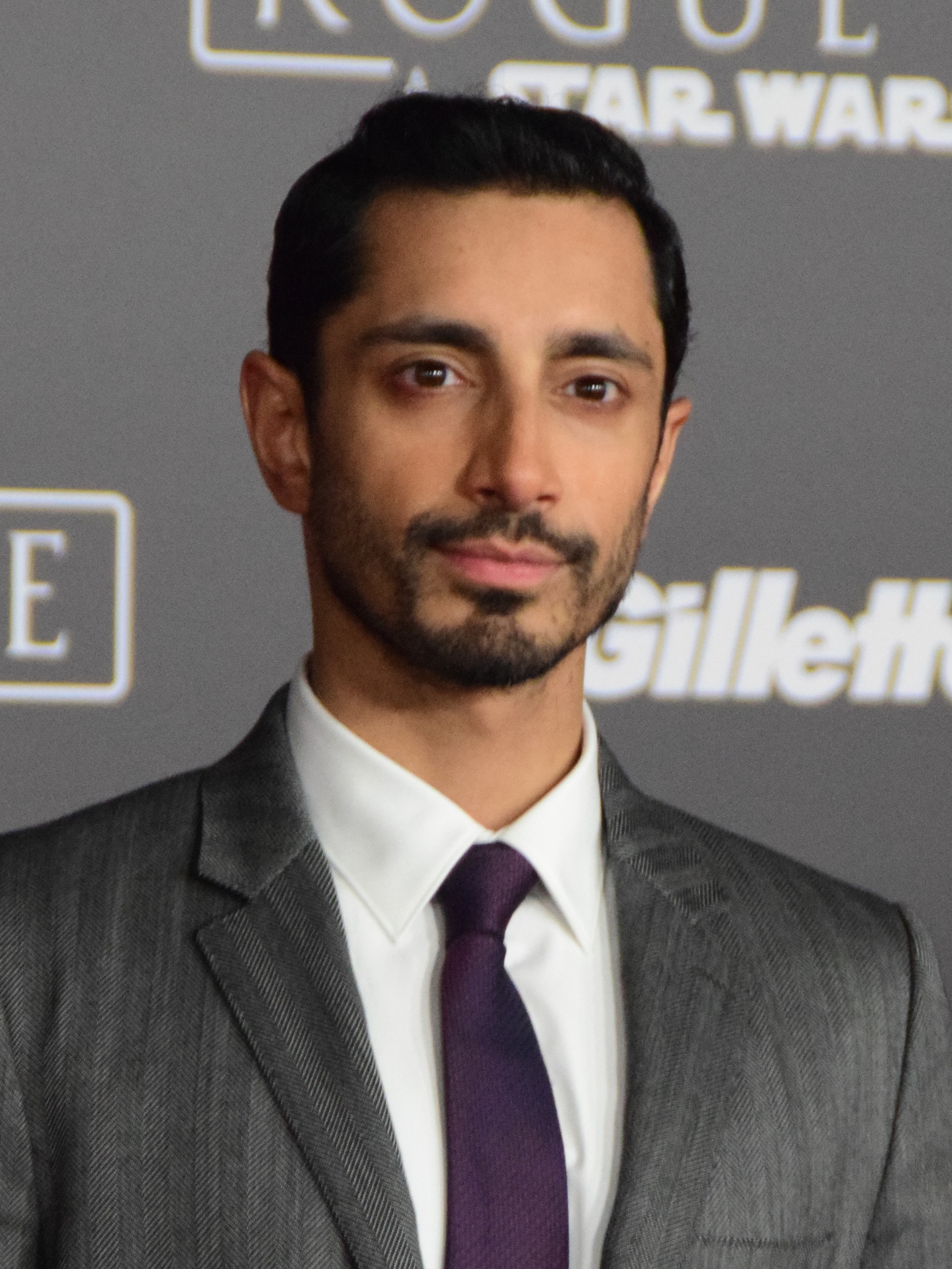
Riz Ahmed, Best Actor in a Leading Role winner

Frances McDormand, Best Actress in a Leading Role winner

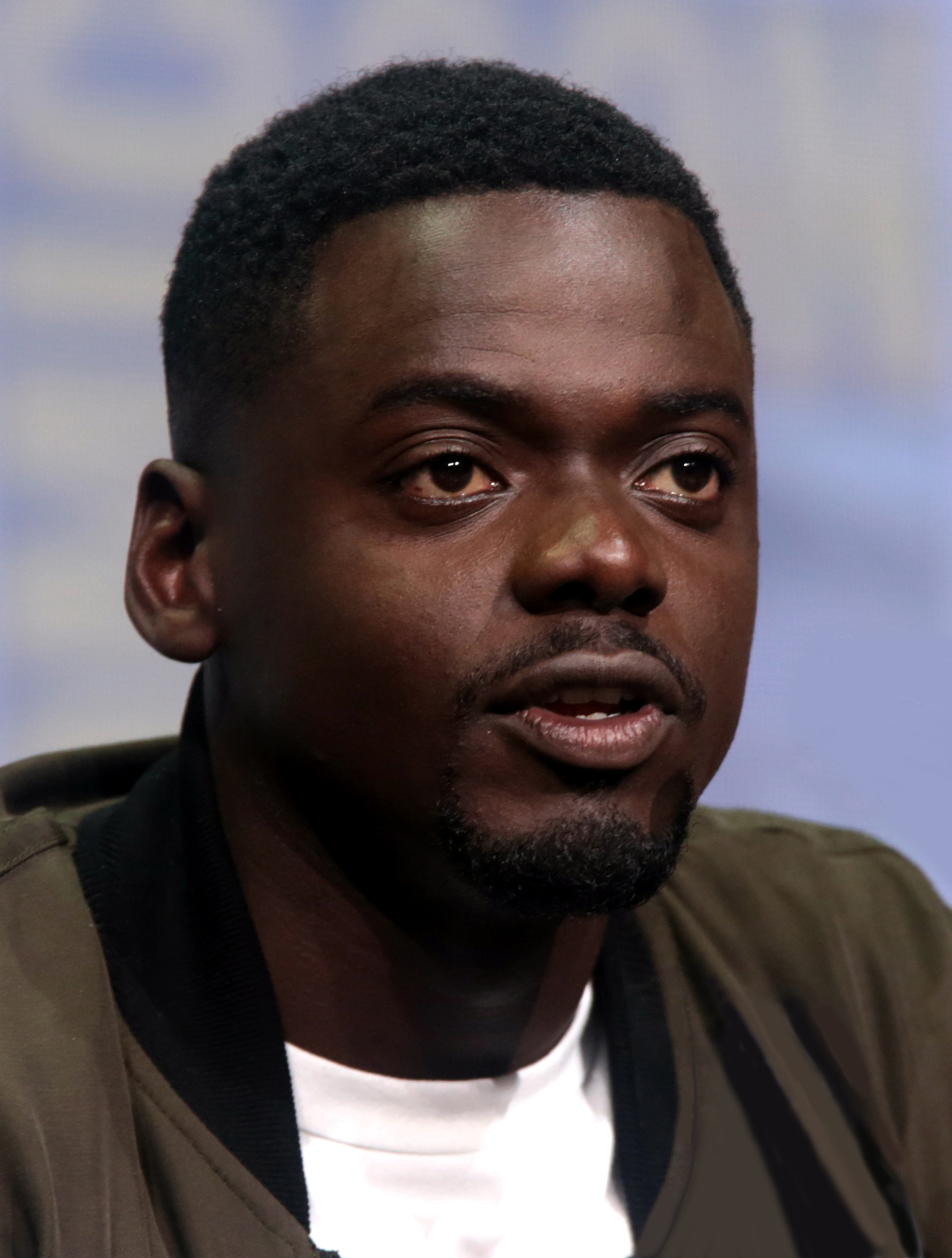
Daniel Kaluuya, Best Actor in a Supporting Role winner

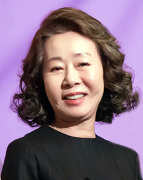
Youn Yuh-jung, Best Actress in a Supporting Role winner

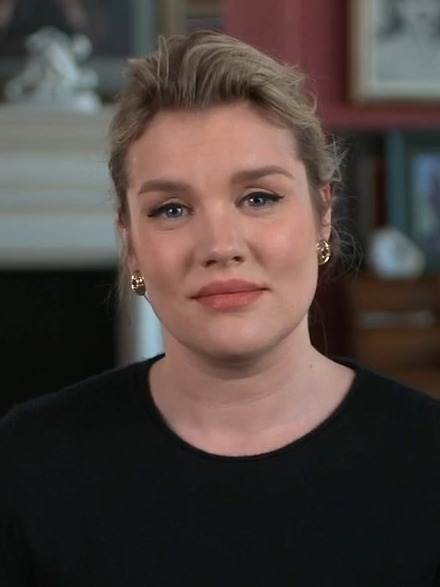
Emerald Fennell, Best Screenplay winner

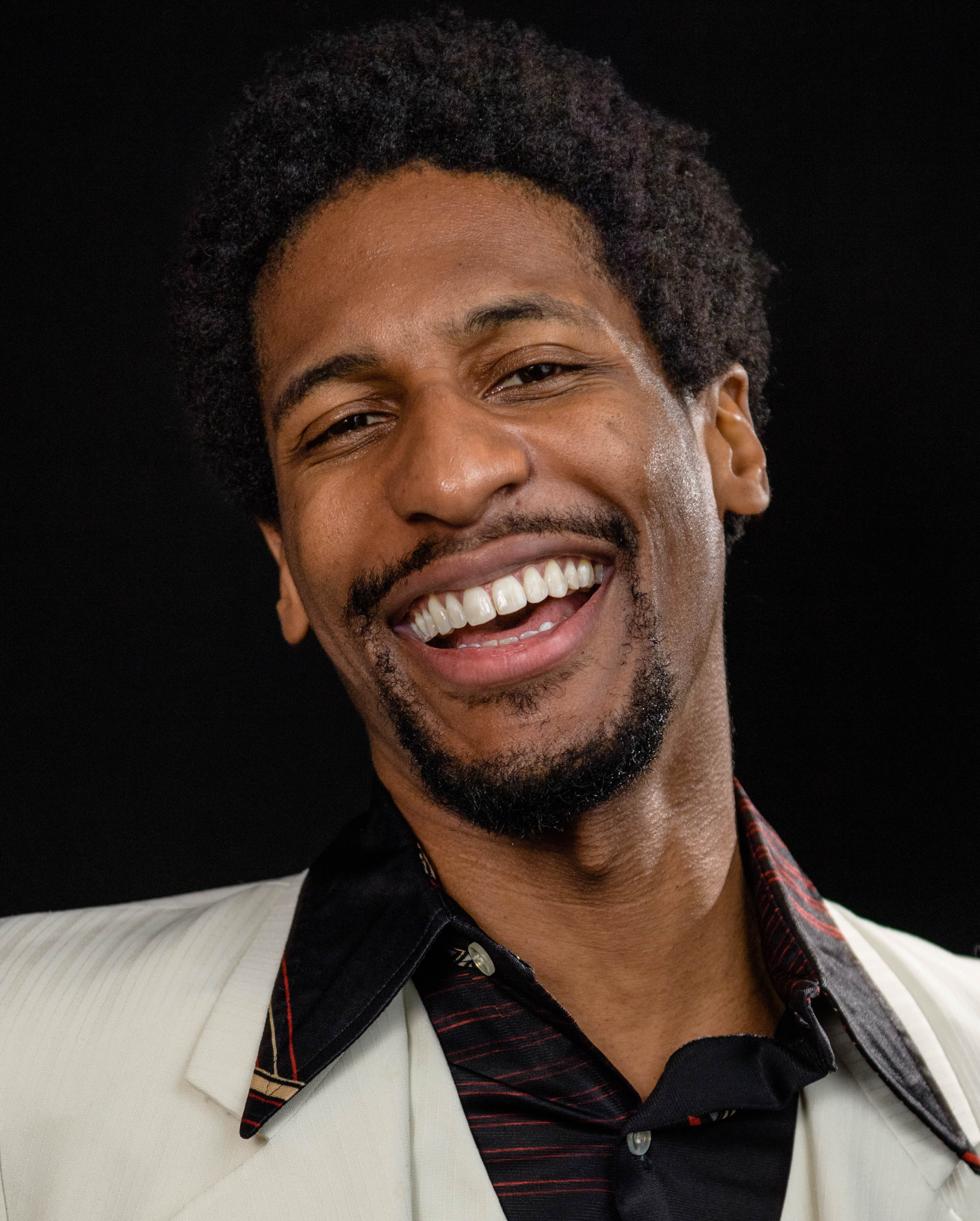
Jon Batiste, Best Original Score co-winner

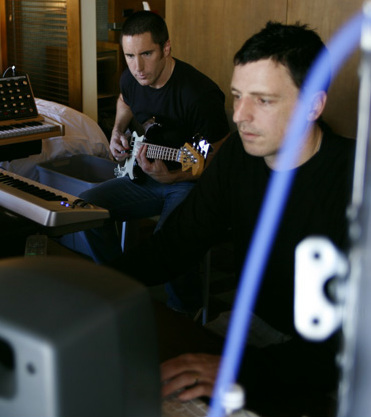
Trent Reznor (left) and Atticus Ross (right), Best Original Score co-winners

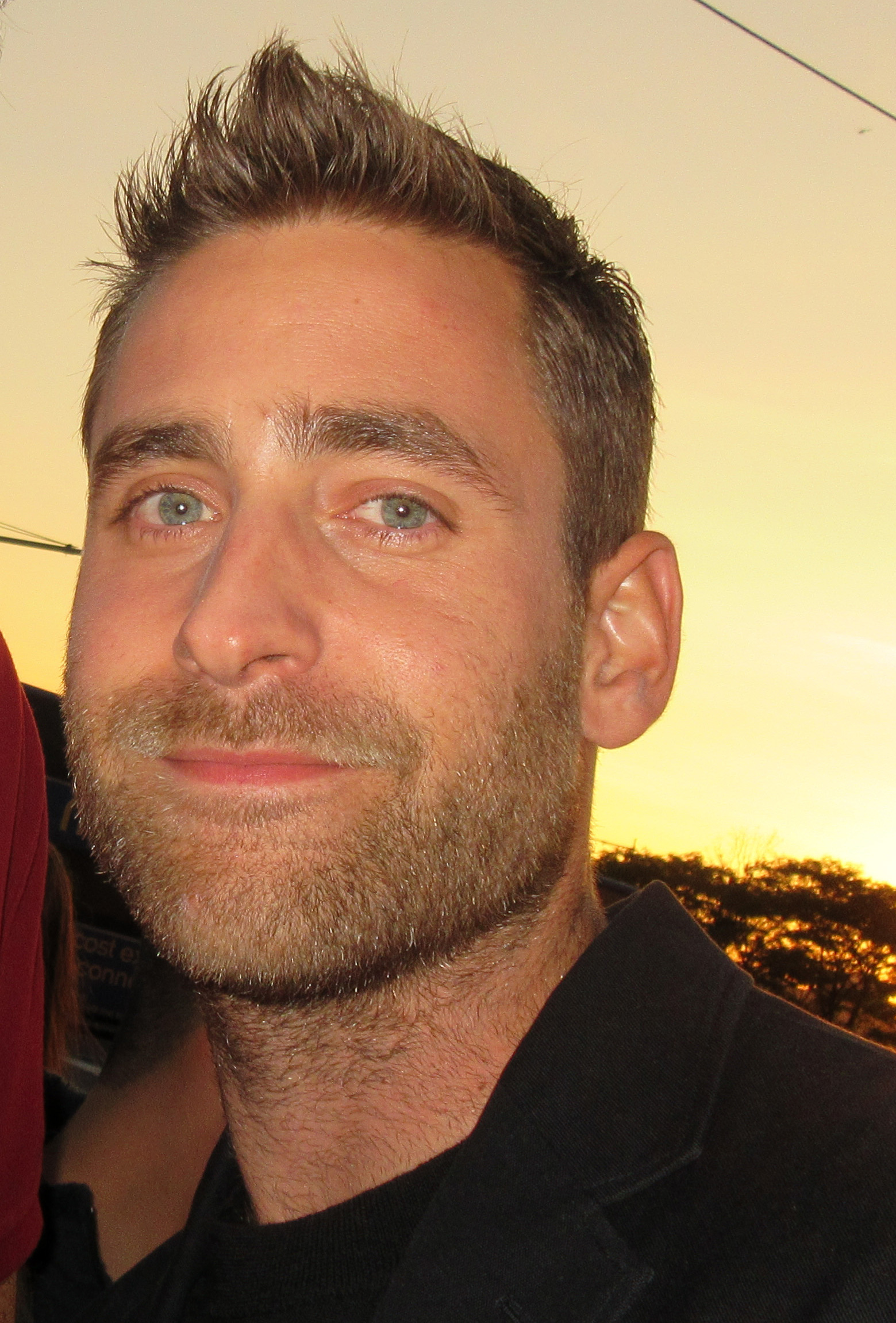
Oliver Jackson-Cohen, Villain of the Year winner

Best Picture of the Year Nomadland: First Cow; Hamilton; The Invisible Man; Judas and the Black Messiah; Minari; Never Rarely Sometimes Always; Palm Springs; Promising Young Woman; Sound of Metal	Best Director Chloé Zhao – Nomadland: Lee Isaac Chung – Minari; Emerald Fennell – Promising Young Woman; Steve McQueen – Lovers Rock; Kelly Reichardt – First Cow
Best Actor in a Leading Role Riz Ahmed – Sound of Metal as Ruben Stone: Chadwick Boseman – Ma Rainey's Black Bottom as Levee Green; Anthony Hopkins – The Father as Anthony; Delroy Lindo – Da 5 Bloods as Paul; Steven Yeun – Minari as Jacob Yi	Best Actress in a Leading Role Frances McDormand – Nomadland as Fern: Viola Davis – Ma Rainey's Black Bottom as Ma Rainey; Sidney Flanigan – Never Rarely Sometimes Always as Autumn; Elisabeth Moss – The Invisible Man as Cecilia Kass; Carey Mulligan – Promising Young Woman as Cassandra "Cassie" Thomas
Best Actor in a Supporting Role Daniel Kaluuya – Judas and the Black Messiah as Fred Hampton: Sacha Baron Cohen – The Trial of the Chicago 7 as Abbie Hoffman; Bill Murray – On the Rocks as Felix Keane; Leslie Odom Jr. – One Night in Miami... as Sam Cooke; Paul Raci – Sound of Metal as Joe	Best Actress in a Supporting Role Youn Yuh-jung – Minari as Soon-ja: Maria Bakalova – Borat Subsequent Moviefilm as Tutar Sagdiyev; Olivia Colman – The Father as Anne; Talia Ryder – Never Rarely Sometimes Always as Skylar; Amanda Seyfried – Mank as Marion Davies
Best Ensemble Cast Da 5 Bloods: Judas and the Black Messiah; Ma Rainey's Black Bottom; Minari; One Night in Miami...	Best Action Choreography Tenet: Birds of Prey; Extraction; The Invisible Man; Monster Hunter
Best Screenplay Promising Young Woman – Emerald Fennell: First Cow – Jonathan Raymond and Kelly Reichardt; I'm Thinking of Ending Things – Charlie Kaufman; Nomadland – Chloé Zhao; Palm Springs – Andy Siara	Best Animated Feature Wolfwalkers – Tomm Moore and Ross Stewart: Onward – Dan Scanlon; Over the Moon – John Kahrs and Glen Keane; Ride Your Wave – Masaaki Yuasa; Soul – Pete Docter and Kemp Powers
Best Documentary Feature The History of the Seattle Mariners: Supercut Edition – Jon Bois: Boys State – Amanda McBaine and Jesse Moss; Collective – Alexander Nanau; Dick Johnson Is Dead – Kirsten Johnson; Time – Garrett Bradley	Best Film Not in the English Language Minari – Lee Isaac Chung: Another Round – Thomas Vinterberg; Bacurau – Juliano Dornelles and Kleber Mendonça Filho; La Llorona – Jayro Bustamante; To the Ends of the Earth – Kiyoshi Kurosawa
Best Cinematography Nomadland – Joshua James Richards: First Cow – Christopher Blauvelt; Lovers Rock – Shabier Kirchner; Mank – Erik Messerschmidt; News of the World – Dariusz Wolski	Best Costume Design Ma Rainey's Black Bottom – Ann Roth: Birds of Prey – Erin Benach; Emma – Alexandra Byrne; First Cow – April Napier; Mank – Trish Summerville
Best Film Editing Nomadland – Chloé Zhao: Da 5 Bloods – Adam Gough; Tenet – Jennifer Lame; Time – Gabriel Rhodes; The Trial of the Chicago 7 – Alan Baumgarten	Best Original Score Soul – Jon Batiste, Trent Reznor, and Atticus Ross: Da 5 Bloods – Terence Blanchard; Mank – Trent Reznor and Atticus Ross; Minari – Emile Mosseri; Tenet – Ludwig Göransson
Best Production Design Mank – Donald Graham Burt (Production Design); Jan Pascale (Set Decoration): First Cow – Anthony Gasparro (Production Design); Vanessa Knoll (Set Decoration); Judas and the Black Messiah – Sam Lisenco (Production Design); Rebecca Brown (Set Decoration); News of the World – David Crank (Production Design); Elizabeth Keenan (Set Decoration); Tenet – Nathan Crowley (Production Design); Kathy Lucas (Set Decoration)	Best Visual Effects Tenet – Mike Chambers, Scott R. Fisher, Andrew Jackson, and Andrew Lockley: Greyhound – Peter Bebb, Nathan McGuinness, Whitney Richman, and Sebastian Theo von Overheidt; The Invisible Man – Aevar Bjarnason, Marcus Bolton, Jonathan Dearing, and Matt Ebb; The Midnight Sky – Matt Kasmir, Chris Lawrence, Max Solomon, and David Watkins; Possessor – Murray Barber, Bryan Jones, and Derek Liscoumb
Best Youth Performance Alan Kim – Minari as David Yi: Millie Bobby Brown – Enola Holmes as Enola Holmes; Ji-hu Park – House of Hummingbird as Eun-hee; Talia Ryder – Never Rarely Sometimes Always as Skylar; Helena Zengel – News of the World as Johanna Leonberger / Cicada	Villain of the Year Adrian Griffin / The Invisible Man – The Invisible Man (portrayed by Oliver Jackson-Cohen): Judge Julius Hoffman – The Trial of the Chicago 7 (portrayed by Frank Langella); Michael – Bacurau (portrayed by Udo Kier); Diane Sherman – Run (portrayed by Sarah Paulson); Roman Sionis / Black Mask – Birds of Prey (portrayed by Ewan McGregor)

Films that received multiple nominations
Nominations	Film
8	Minari
6	First Cow
6	Nomadland
5	The Invisible Man
5	Mank
5	Tenet
4	Da 5 Bloods
4	Judas and the Black Messiah
4	Ma Rainey's Black Bottom
4	Never Rarely Sometimes Always
4	Promising Young Woman
3	Birds of Prey
3	News of the World
3	Sound of Metal
3	The Trial of the Chicago 7
2	Palm Springs
2	Soul

Films that received multiple awards
Awards	Film
5	Nomadland
3	Minari
2	Tenet
