= 25th Satellite Awards =

2021 awards ceremony for film and television

- Date: February 15, 2021

Highlights
- Best Motion Picture – Drama: Nomadland
- Best Motion Picture – Comedy or Musical: The Forty-Year-Old Version
- Best Television Series – Drama: Better Call Saul
- Best Television Series – Comedy or Musical: Schitt's Creek
- Best Miniseries & Limited Series: The Good Lord Bird

The 25th Satellite Awards is an award ceremony honoring the year's outstanding performers, films and television shows, presented by the International Press Academy.

The nominations were announced on February 1, 2021. The winners were announced on February 15, 2021.

== Special achievement awards ==
- Auteur Award (for singular vision and unique artistic control over the elements of production) – Emerald Fennell (Promising Young Woman)
- Humanitarian Award (for making a difference in the lives of those in the artistic community and beyond) – Mark Wahlberg
- Mary Pickford Award (for outstanding contribution to the entertainment industry) – Tilda Swinton
- Nikola Tesla Award (for visionary achievement in filmmaking technology) – Dick Pope
- Best First Feature – Channing Godfrey Peoples (Miss Juneteenth)
- Ensemble: Motion Picture – The Trial of the Chicago 7
- Ensemble: Television – The Good Lord Bird
- Stunt Performance Award – Gaëlle Cohen

== Motion picture winners and nominees ==
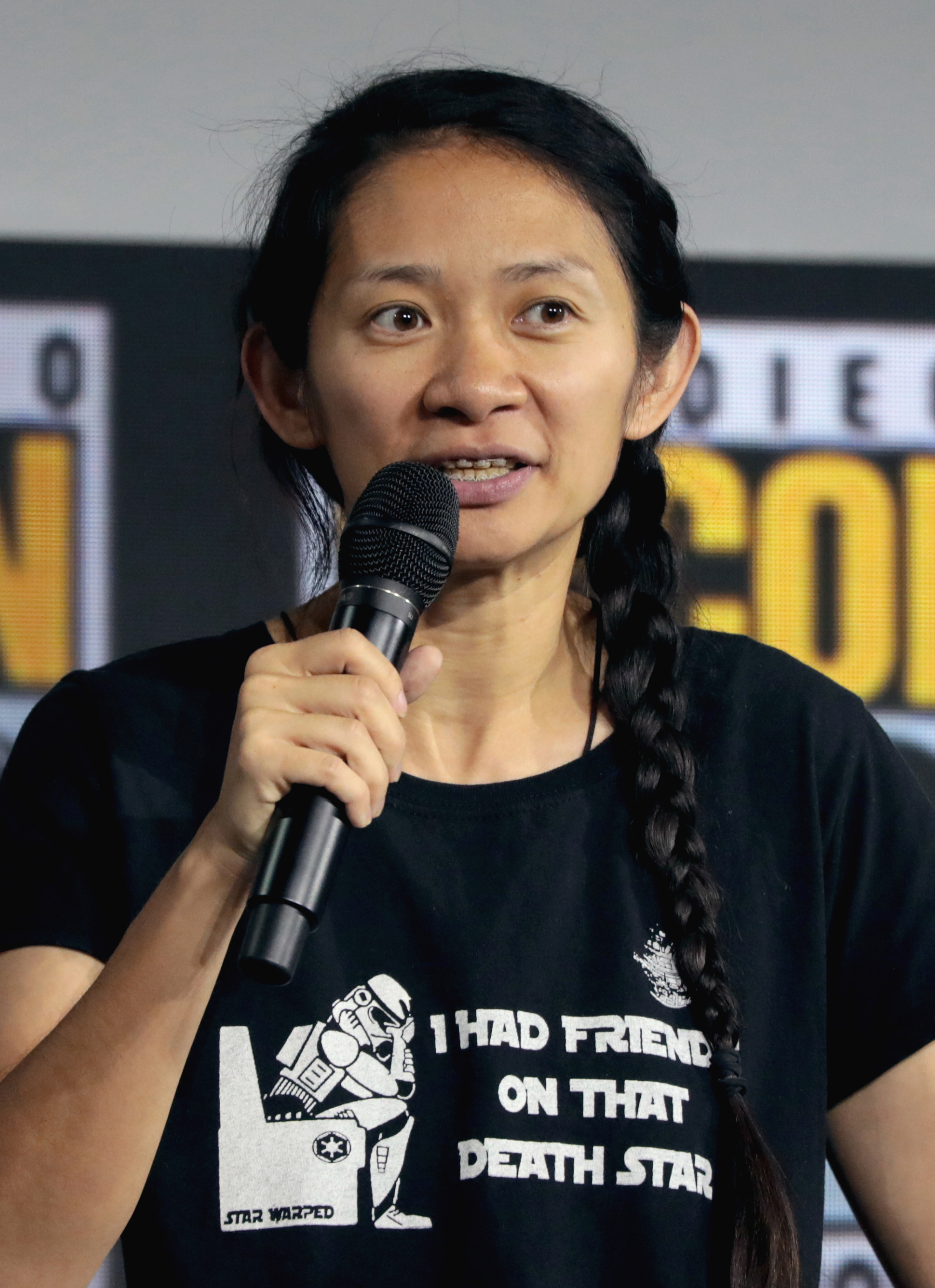
Chloé Zhao, Best Director winner

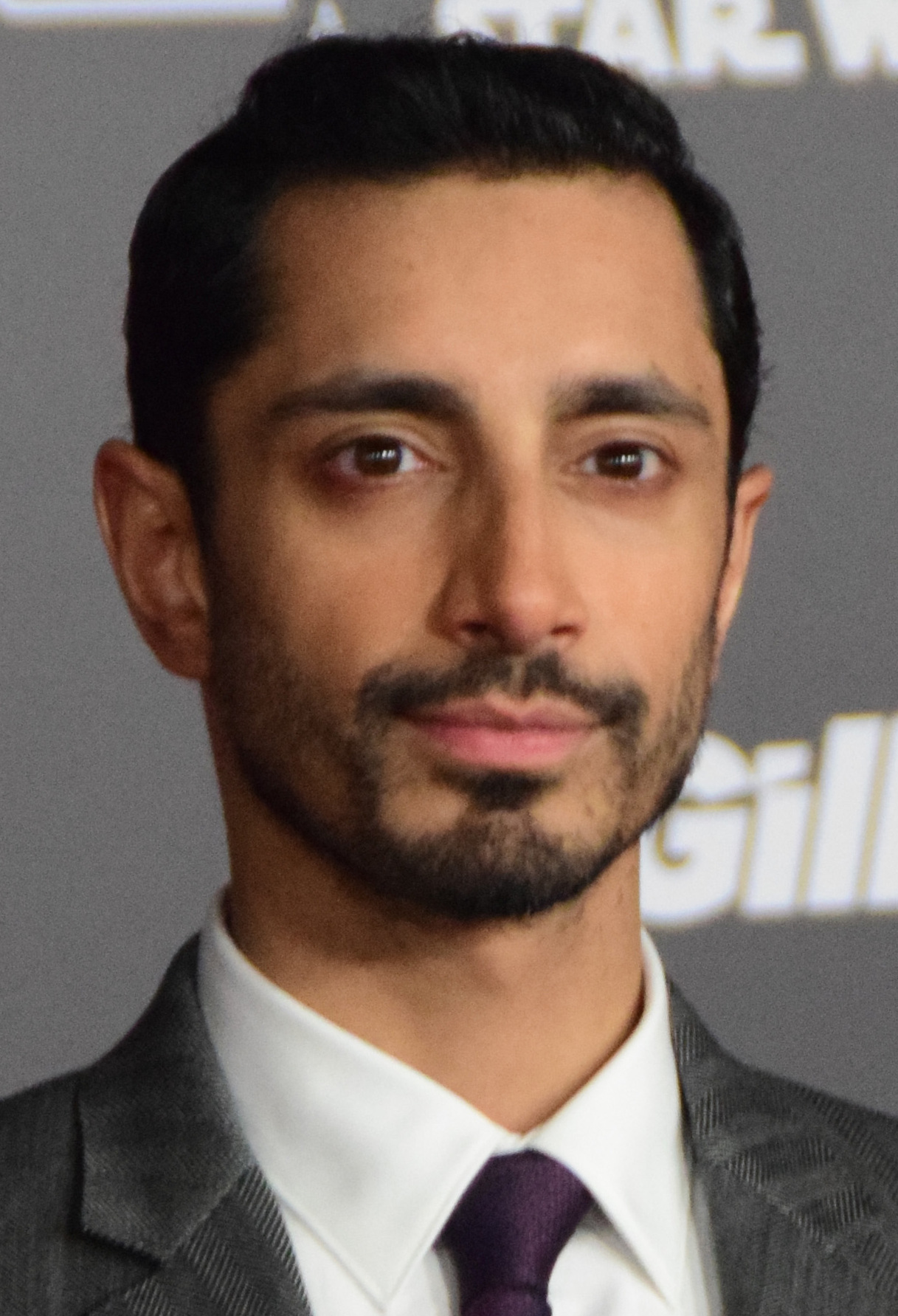
Riz Ahmed, Best Actor in a Motion Picture – Drama winner

Frances McDormand, Best Actress in a Motion Picture – Drama winner

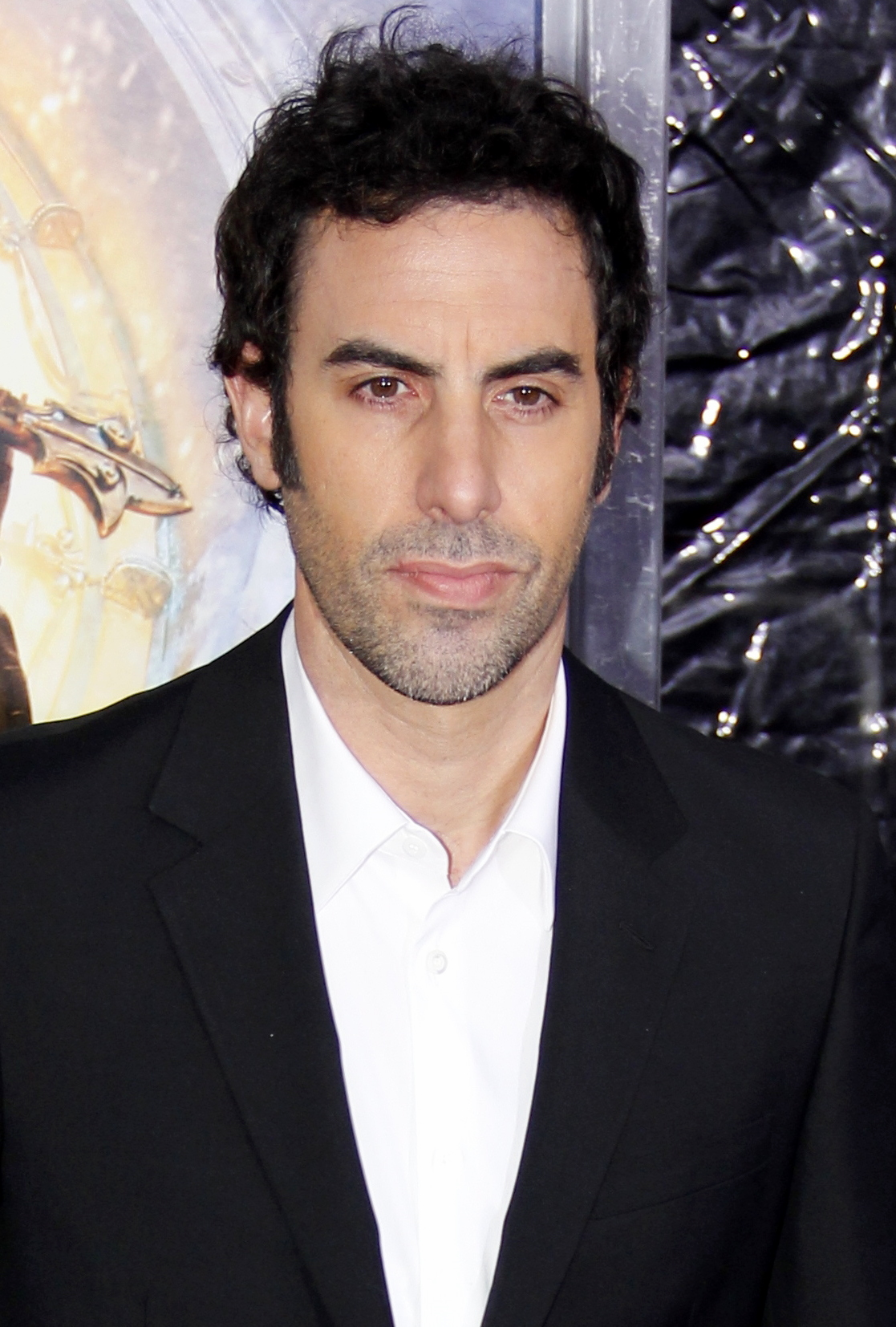
Sacha Baron Cohen, Best Actor in a Motion Picture – Comedy or Musical winner

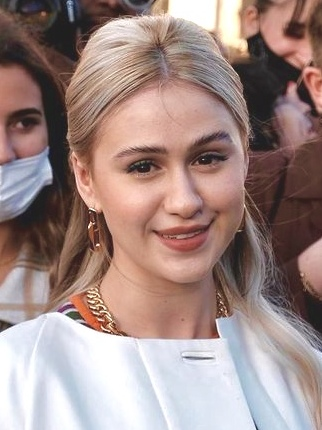
Maria Bakalova, Best Actress in a Motion Picture – Comedy or Musical winner

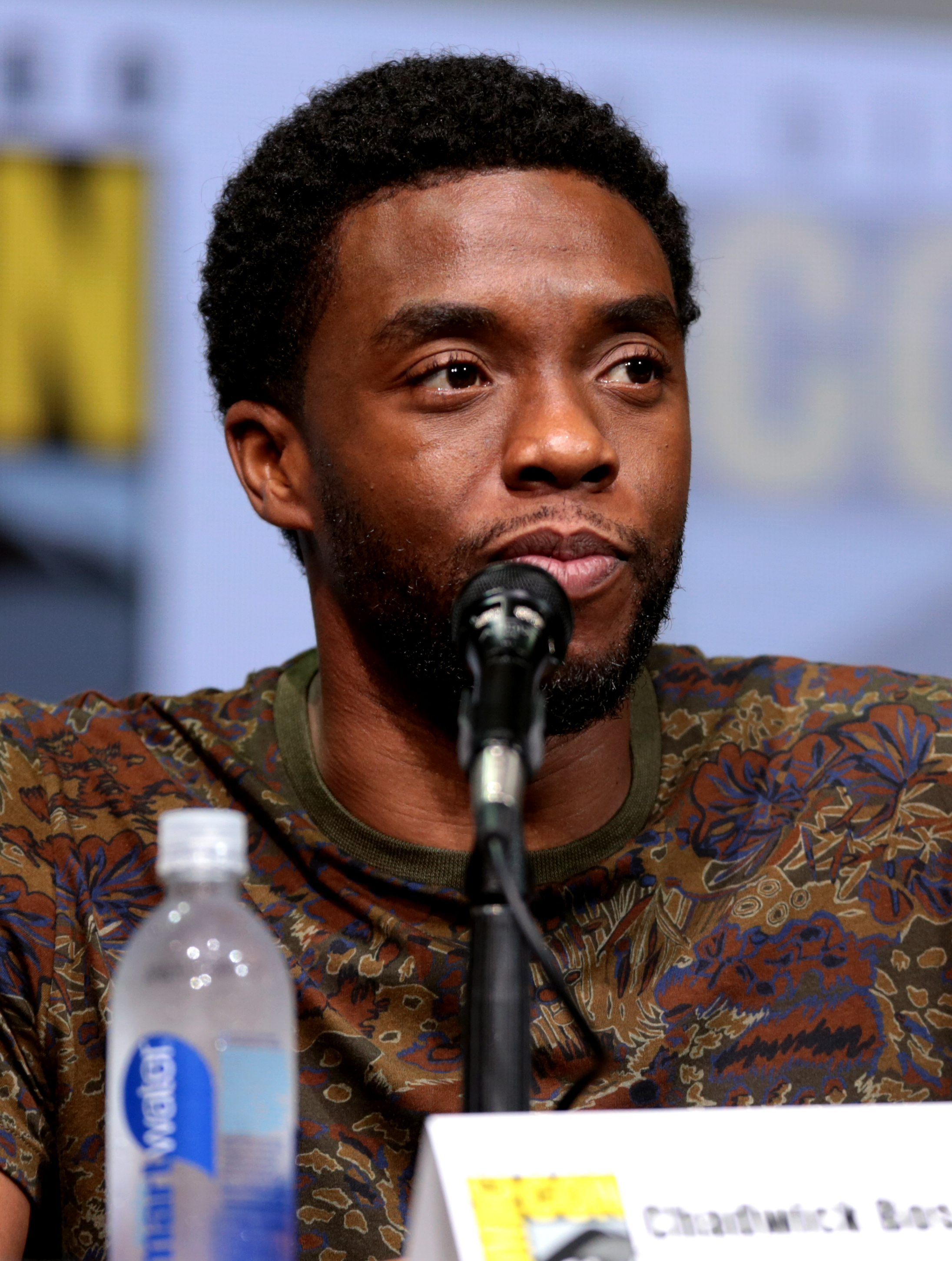
Chadwick Boseman, Best Actor in a Supporting Role winner

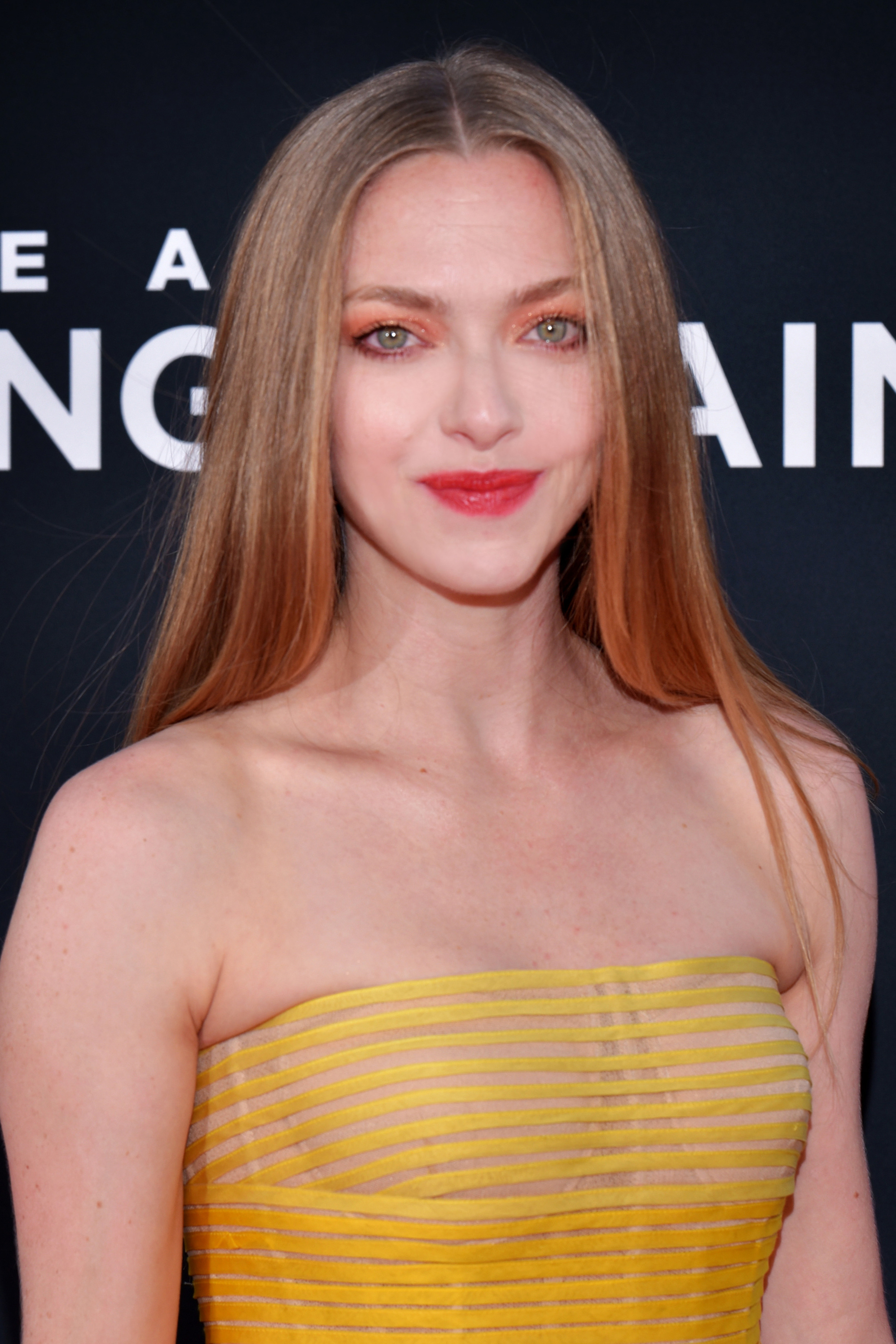
Amanda Seyfried, Best Actress in a Supporting Role winner

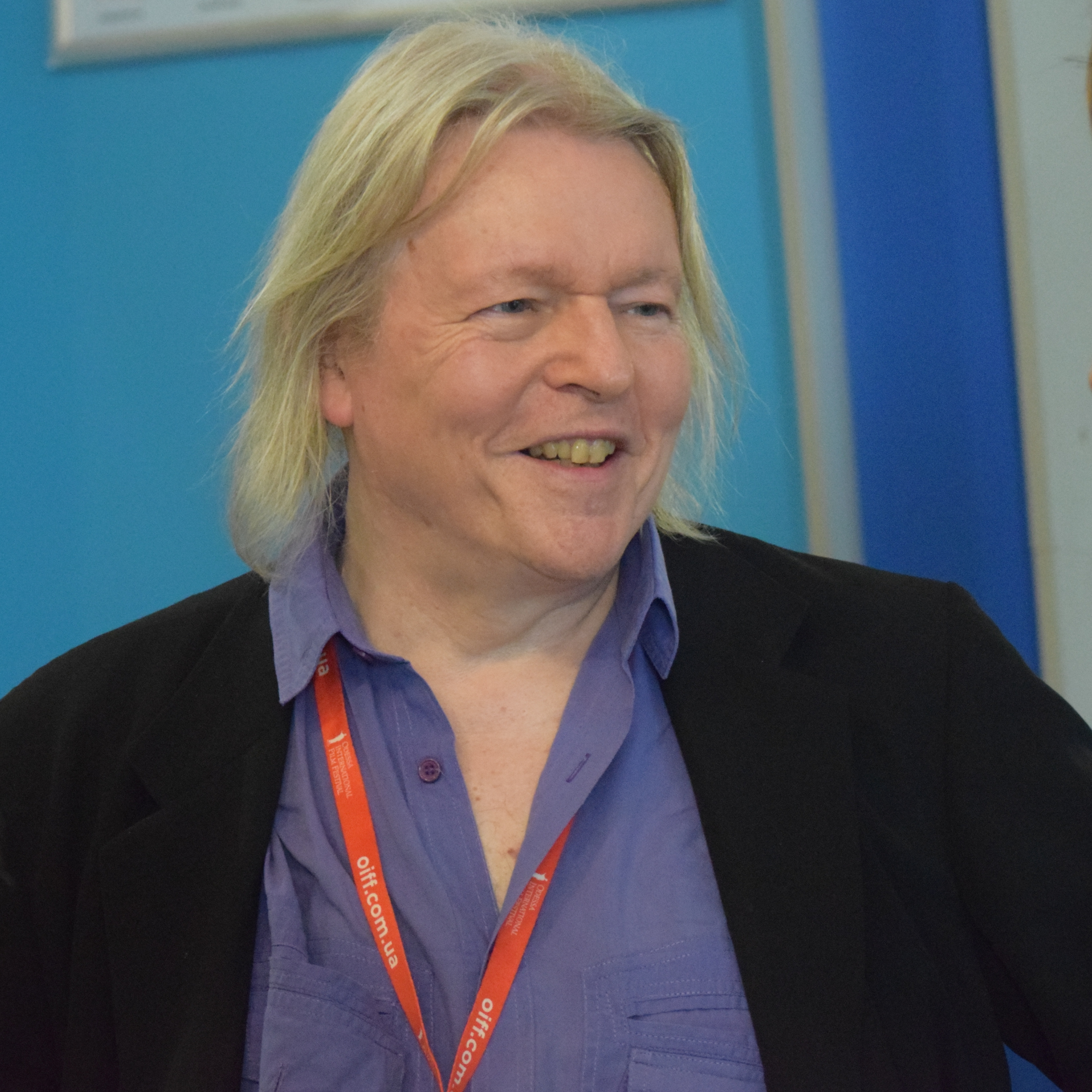
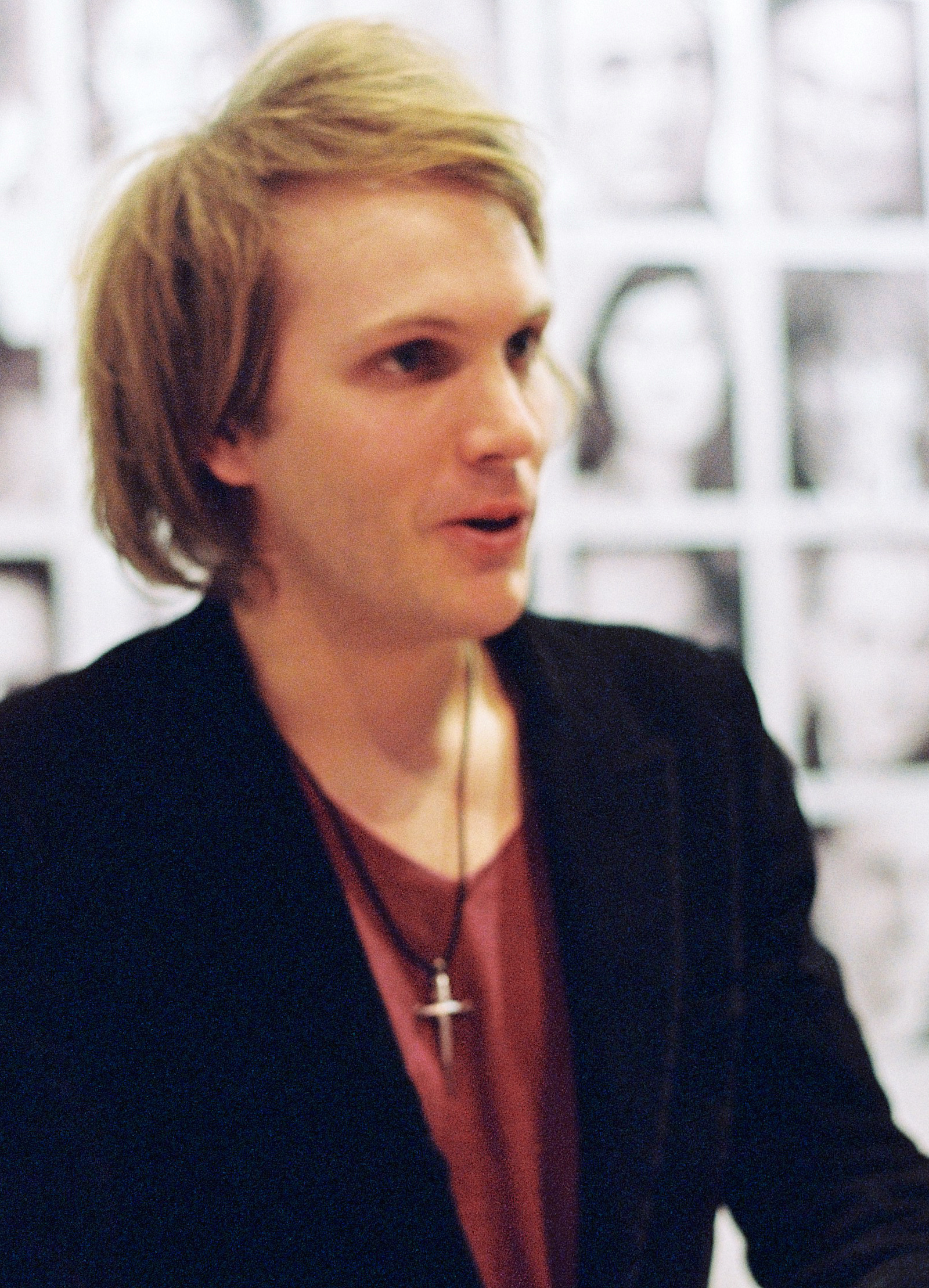
Christopher Hampton and Florian Zeller, Best Adapted Screenplay winners

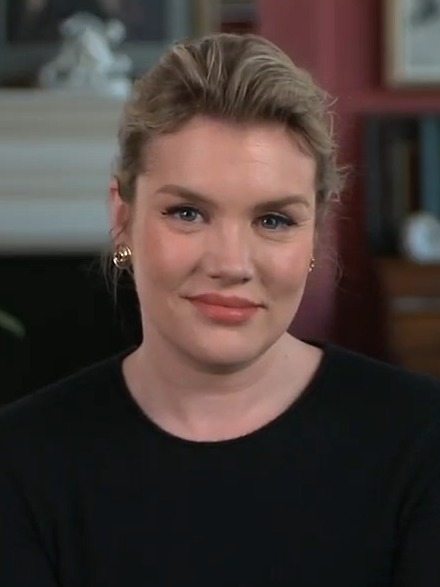
Emerald Fennell, Best Original Screenplay winner

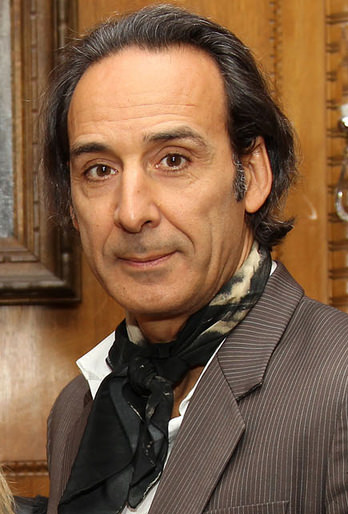
Alexandre Desplat, Best Original Score winner

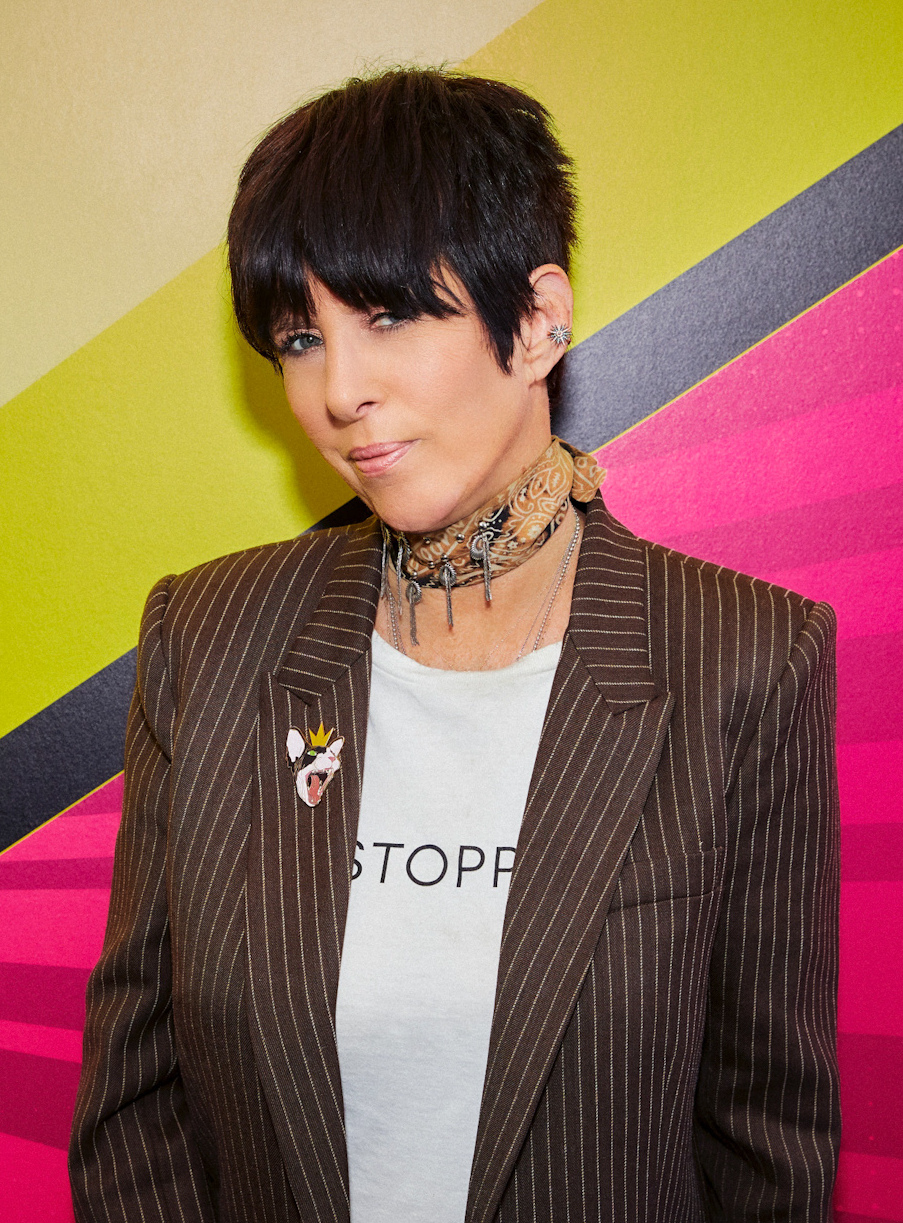
Diane Warren, Best Original Song co-winner

Winners are listed first and highlighted in bold.

Best Motion Picture – Drama	Best Motion Picture – Comedy or Musical
**Nomadland**; The Father; Ma Rainey's Black Bottom; Minari; Miss Juneteenth; One Night in Miami...; Promising Young Woman; Sound of Metal; Tenet; The Trial of the Chicago 7	**The Forty-Year-Old Version**; Borat Subsequent Moviefilm; Hamilton; On the Rocks; Palm Springs; The Personal History of David Copperfield
Best Motion Picture – Animated or Mixed Media	Best Director
**Wolfwalkers**; Accidental Luxuriance of the Translucent Watery Rebus; Demon Slayer: Kimetsu no Yaiba – The Movie: Mugen Train; No.7 Cherry Lane; Over the Moon; Soul	**Chloé Zhao – Nomadland**; Lee Isaac Chung – Minari; David Fincher – Mank; Darius Marder – Sound of Metal; Aaron Sorkin – The Trial of the Chicago 7; Florian Zeller – The Father
Best Actor in a Motion Picture – Drama	Best Actress in a Motion Picture – Drama
**Riz Ahmed – Sound of Metal as Ruben Stone**; Chadwick Boseman – Ma Rainey's Black Bottom as Levee Green; Anthony Hopkins – The Father as Anthony; Delroy Lindo – Da 5 Bloods as Paul; Gary Oldman – Mank as Herman J. Mankiewicz; Steven Yeun – Minari as Jacob Yi	**Frances McDormand – Nomadland as Fern**; Viola Davis – Ma Rainey's Black Bottom as Ma Rainey; Vanessa Kirby – Pieces of a Woman as Martha Weiss; Sophia Loren – The Life Ahead as Madame Rosa; Carey Mulligan – Promising Young Woman as Cassandra "Cassie" Thomas; Kate Winslet – Ammonite as Mary Anning
Best Actor in a Motion Picture – Comedy or Musical	Best Actress in a Motion Picture – Comedy or Musical
**Sacha Baron Cohen – Borat Subsequent Moviefilm as Borat Sagdiyev**; Lin-Manuel Miranda – Hamilton as Alexander Hamilton; Leslie Odom Jr. – Hamilton as Aaron Burr; Dev Patel – The Personal History of David Copperfield as David Copperfield; Andy Samberg – Palm Springs as Nyles	**Maria Bakalova – Borat Subsequent Moviefilm as Tutar Sagdiyev**; Rashida Jones – On the Rocks as Laura Keane; Michelle Pfeiffer – French Exit as Frances Price; Margot Robbie – Birds of Prey as Harley Quinn; Meryl Streep – The Prom as Dee Dee Allen; Anya Taylor-Joy – Emma as Emma Woodhouse
Best Actor in a Supporting Role	Best Actress in a Supporting Role
**Chadwick Boseman – Da 5 Bloods as "Stormin'" Norman Earl Holloway**; Sacha Baron Cohen – The Trial of the Chicago 7 as Abbie Hoffman; Kingsley Ben-Adir – One Night in Miami... as Malcolm X; Brian Dennehy – Driveways as Del; Bill Murray – On the Rocks as Felix Keane; David Strathairn – Nomadland as David	**Amanda Seyfried – Mank as Marion Davies**; Ellen Burstyn – Pieces of a Woman as Elizabeth Weiss; Olivia Colman – The Father as Anne; Nicole Kidman – The Prom as Angie Dickinson; Youn Yuh-jung – Minari as Soon-ja; Helena Zengel – News of the World as Johanna Leonberger / Cicada
Best Original Screenplay	Best Adapted Screenplay
**Promising Young Woman – Emerald Fennell**; Mank – Jack Fincher; Minari – Lee Isaac Chung; Palm Springs – Andy Siara; Soul – Pete Docter, Mike Jones, and Kemp Powers; The Trial of the Chicago 7 – Aaron Sorkin	**The Father – Christopher Hampton and Florian Zeller**; The Life Ahead – Edoardo Ponti; Ma Rainey's Black Bottom – Ruben Santiago-Hudson; News of the World – Luke Davies and Paul Greengrass; Nomadland – Jessica Bruder and Chloé Zhao; One Night in Miami... – Kemp Powers
Best Motion Picture – Documentary	Best Motion Picture – International
**Collective**; Acasă, My Home; Circus of Books; Coup 53; Crip Camp; The Dissident; Gunda; MLK/FBI; A Most Beautiful Thing; The Truffle Hunters	**La Llorona (Guatemala)**; Another Round (Denmark); Atlantis (Ukraine); I'm No Longer Here (Mexico); Jallikattu (India); My Little Sister (Switzerland); A Sun (Taiwan); Tove (Finland); Two of Us (France)
Best Cinematography	Best Film Editing
**Mank – Erik Messerschmidt**; The Midnight Sky – Martin Ruhe; News of the World – Dariusz Wolski; Nomadland – Joshua James Richards; One Night in Miami... – Tami Reiker; Tenet – Hoyte van Hoytema	**The Trial of the Chicago 7 – Alan Baumgarten**; The Father – Yorgos Lamprinos; Mank – Kirk Baxter; Minari – Harry Yoon; Nomadland – Chloé Zhao; One Night in Miami... – Tariq Anwar
Best Art Direction and Production Design	Best Costume Design
**Mank – Donald Graham Burt, Chris Craine, Jan Pascale, and Dan Webster**; The Midnight Sky – Jim Bissell and John Bush; Mulan – Anne Kuljian and Grant Major; One Night in Miami... – Page Buckner, Barry Robison, and Mark Zuelzke; The Personal History of David Copperfield – Cristina Casali and Charlotte Dirickx; The Prom – Jamie Walker McCall and Gene Serdena	**The Personal History of David Copperfield – Suzie Harman and Robert Worley**; Emma – Alexandra Byrne; Ma Rainey's Black Bottom – Ann Roth; Mank – Trish Summerville; Mulan – Bina Daigeler; One Night in Miami... – Francine Jamison-Tanchuck
Best Original Score	Best Original Song
**The Midnight Sky – Alexandre Desplat**; Mank – Trent Reznor and Atticus Ross; Minari – Emile Mosseri; News of the World – James Newton Howard; One Night in Miami... – Terence Blanchard; Tenet – Ludwig Göransson	**"Io sì (Seen)" – The Life Ahead (Niccolò Agliardi, Laura Pausini, and Diane Warren)**; "Everybody Cries" – The Outpost (Larry Groupé, Rod Lurie, and Rita Wilson); "Hear My Voice" – The Trial of the Chicago 7 (Daniel Pemberton and Celeste Waite); "The Other Side" – Trolls World Tour (Justin Timberlake); "Rocket to the Moon" – Over the Moon (Christopher Curtis, Marjorie Duffield, and Helen Park); "Speak Now" – One Night in Miami... (Sam Ashworth and Leslie Odom Jr.)
Best Sound (Editing and Mixing)	Best Visual Effects
**Sound of Metal – Jaime Baksht, Nicolas Becker, Phillip Bladh, Carlos Cortés, Michelle Couttolenc, and Carolina Santana**; Mank – Ren Klyce, Drew Kunin, Jeremy Molod, Nathan Nance, and David Parker; The Midnight Sky – Todd Beckett, Danny Hambrook, Dan Hiland, Bjorn Schroeder, and Randy Thom; Nomadland – Sergio Díaz, Zach Seivers, and M. Wolf Snyder; The Prom – David Giammarco, Gary Megregian, Steven A. Morrow, and Mark Paterson; Tenet – Willie D. Burton, Richard King, Kevin O'Connell, and Gary A. Rizzo	**Tenet – Scott R. Fisher and Andrew Jackson**; Birds of Prey – Thrain Shadbolt and Kevin Souls; Greyhound – Peter Bebb and Nathan McGuinness; Mank – Simon Carr, Pablo Helman, James Pastorius, and Wei Zheng; The Midnight Sky – Matt Kasmir and Chris Lawrence; Mulan – Sean Andrew Faden

=== Films with multiple nominations ===
Nominations	Films
11	Mank
9	One Night in Miami...
8	Nomadland
7	Minari
6	The Father
6	The Trial of the Chicago 7
5	Ma Rainey's Black Bottom
5	The Midnight Sky
5	Tenet
4	News of the World
4	The Personal History of David Copperfield
4	The Prom
4	Sound of Metal
3	Borat Subsequent Moviefilm
3	Hamilton
3	The Life Ahead
3	Mulan
3	On the Rocks
3	Palm Springs
3	Promising Young Woman
2	Birds of Prey
2	Da 5 Bloods
2	Emma
2	Over the Moon
2	Pieces of a Woman
2	Soul

=== Films with multiple wins ===
Wins	Films
3	Mank
3	Nomadland
2	Borat Subsequent Moviefilm
2	Sound of Metal
2	The Trial of the Chicago 7

== Television winners and nominees ==
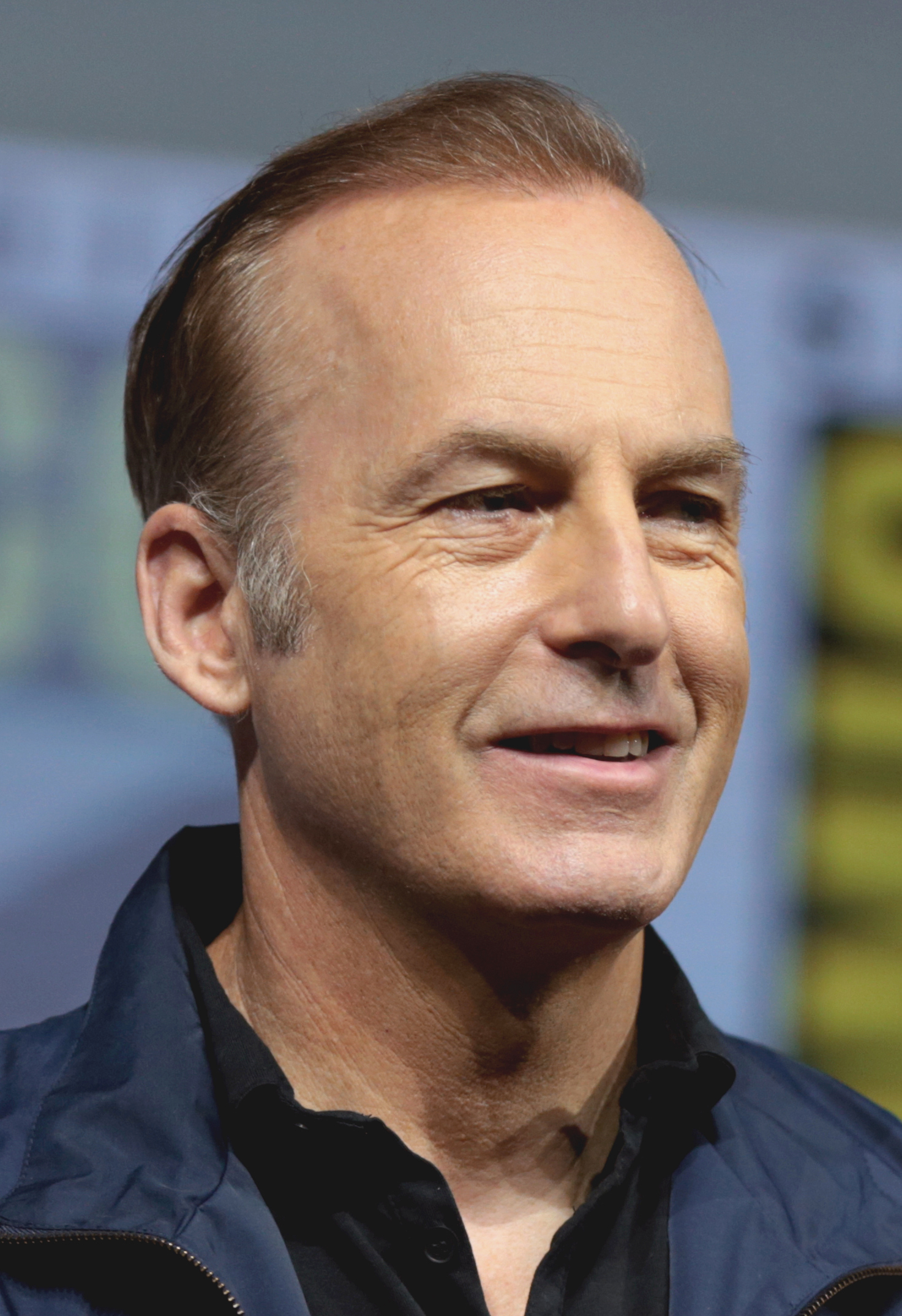
Bob Odenkirk, Best Actor in a Drama / Genre Series winner

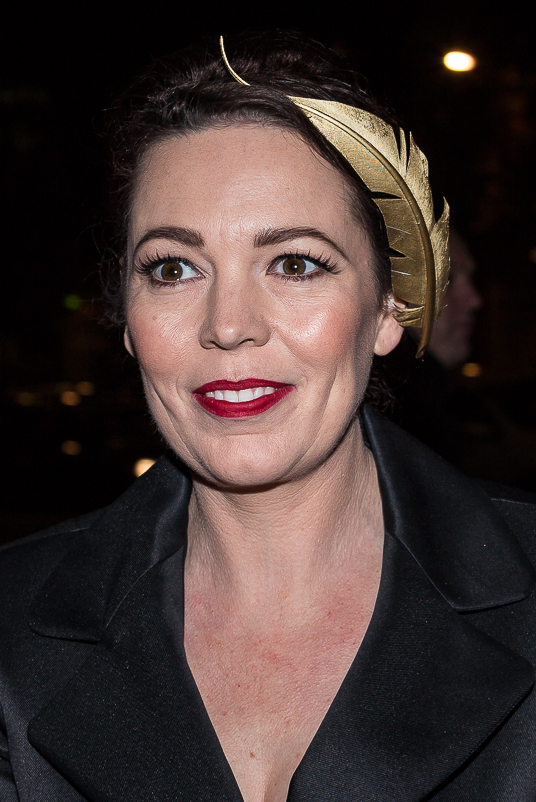
Olivia Colman, Best Actress in a Drama / Genre Series winner

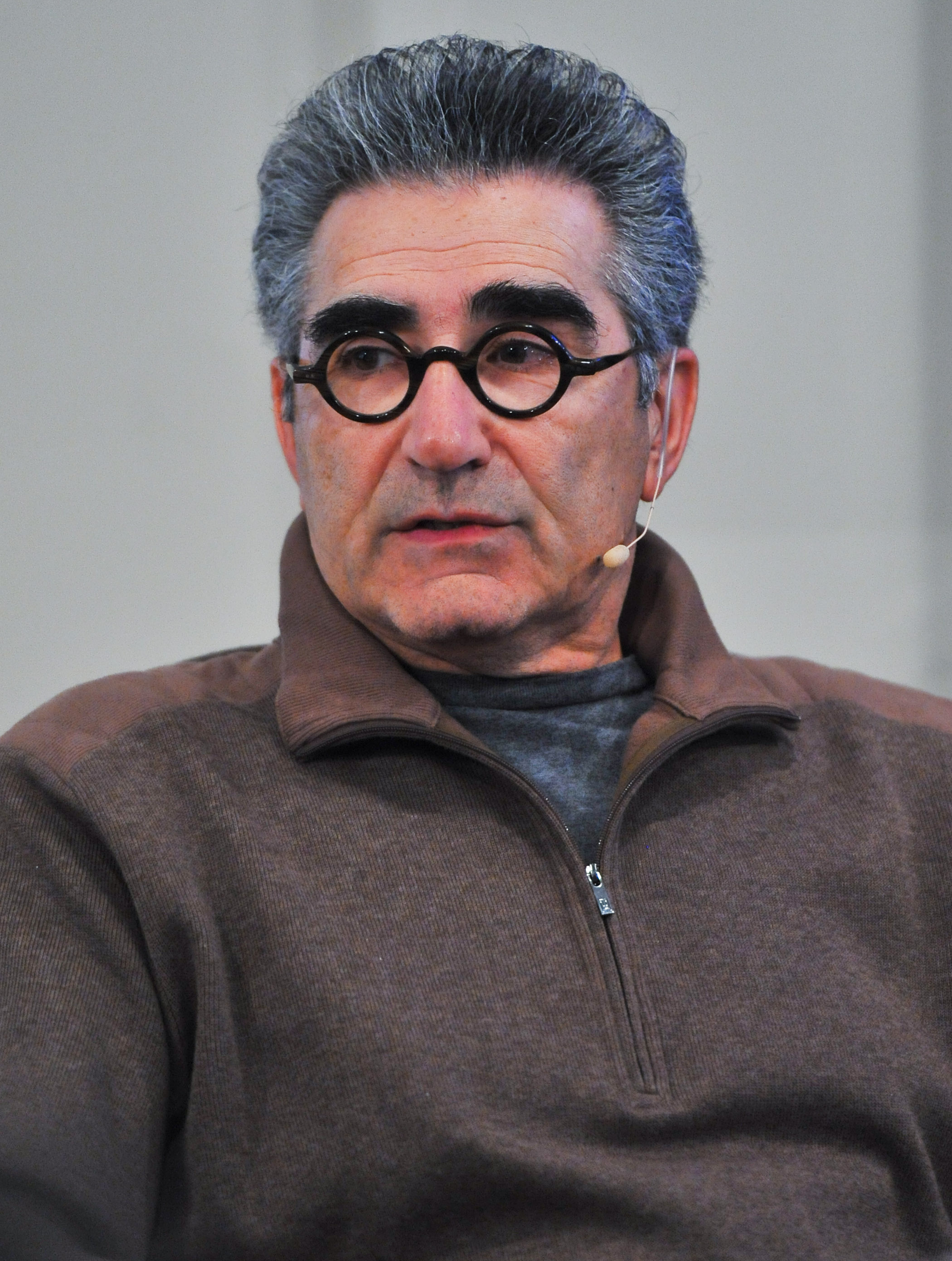
Eugene Levy, Best Actor in a Comedy or Musical Series winner

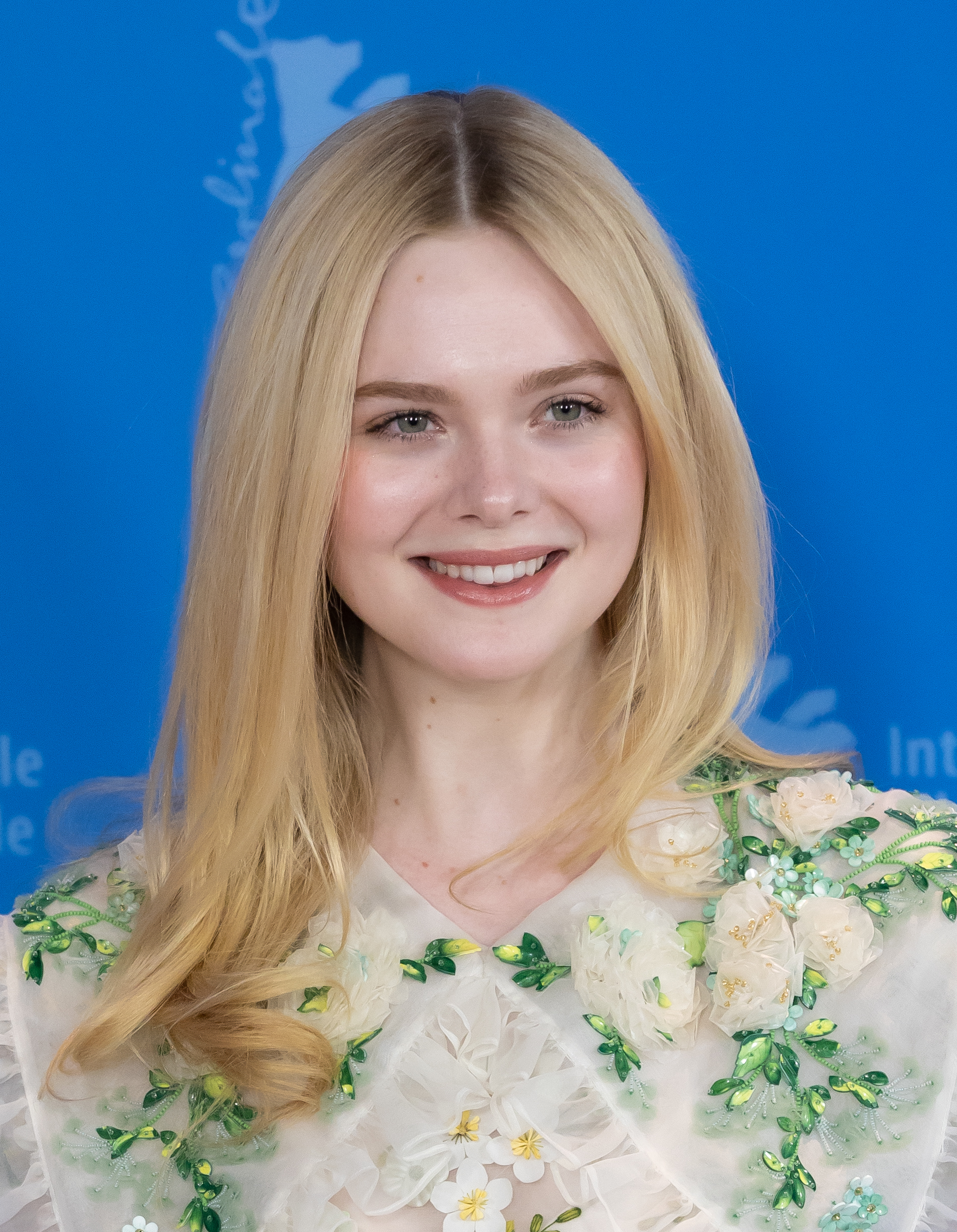
Elle Fanning, Best Actress in a Comedy or Musical Series winner

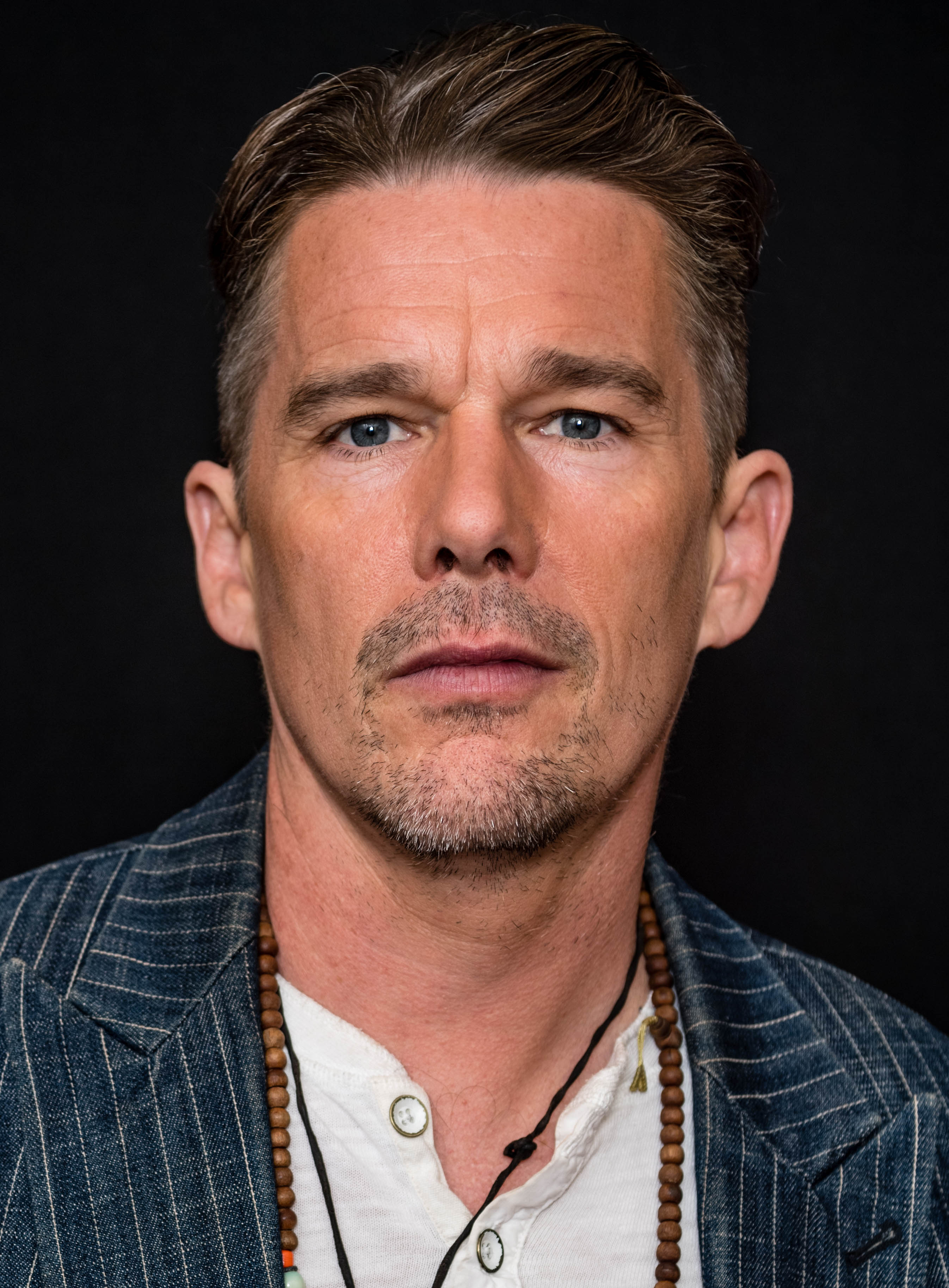
Ethan Hawke, Best Actor in a Miniseries & Limited Series or Motion Picture Made for Television winner

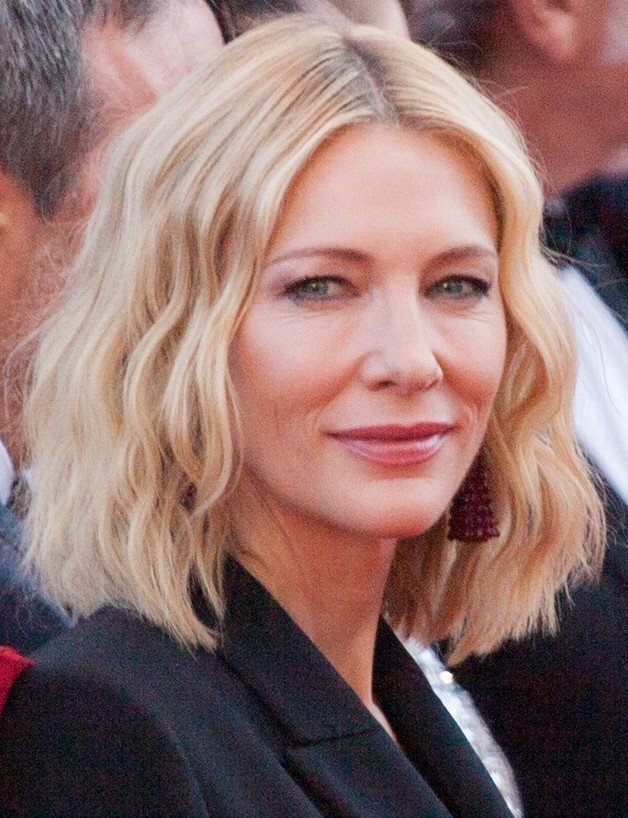
Cate Blanchett, Best Actress in a Miniseries & Limited Series or Motion Picture Made for Television winner

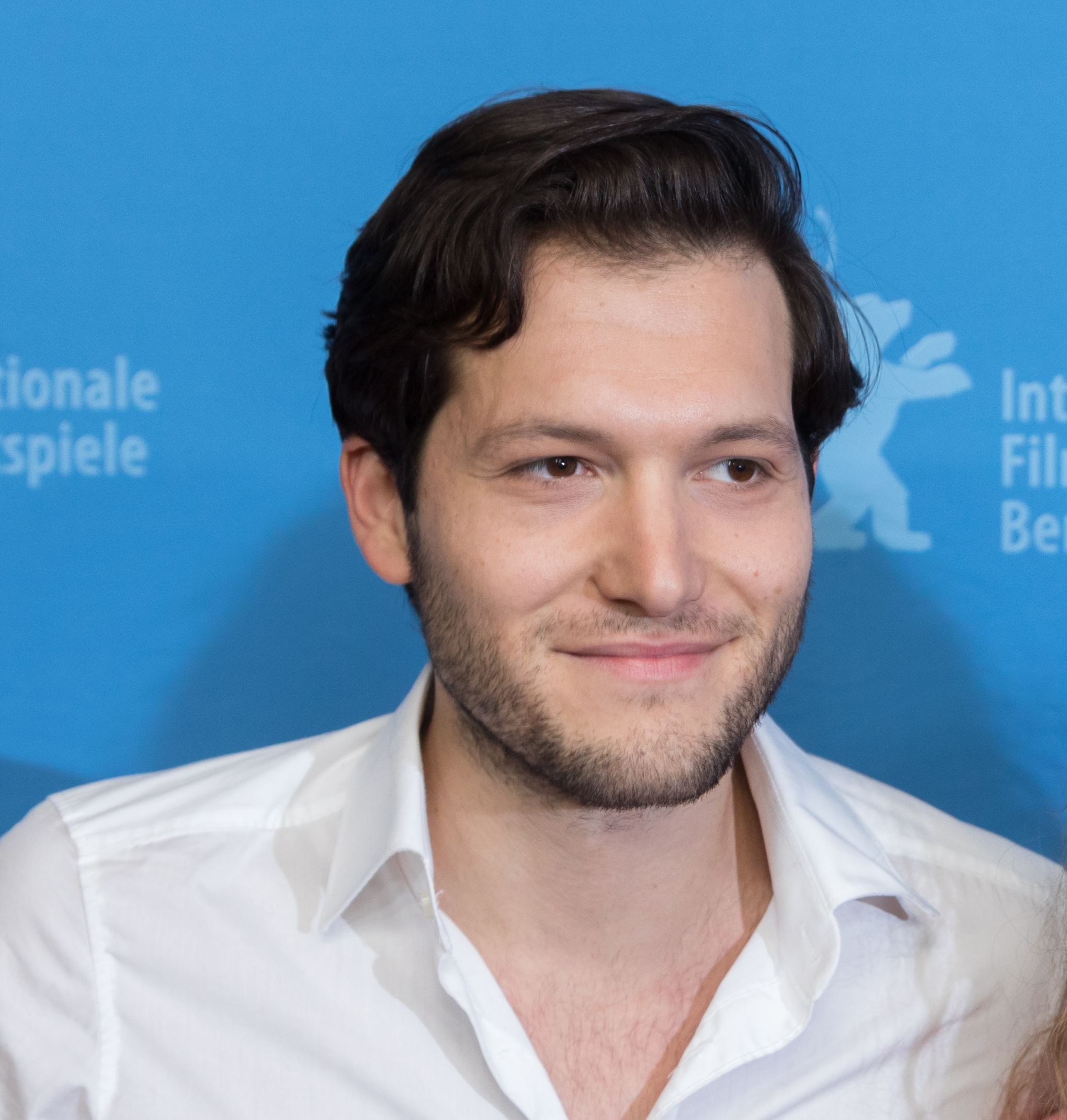
Jeff Wilbusch, Best Actor in a Supporting Role in a Series, Miniseries & Limited Series, or Motion Picture Made for Television winner

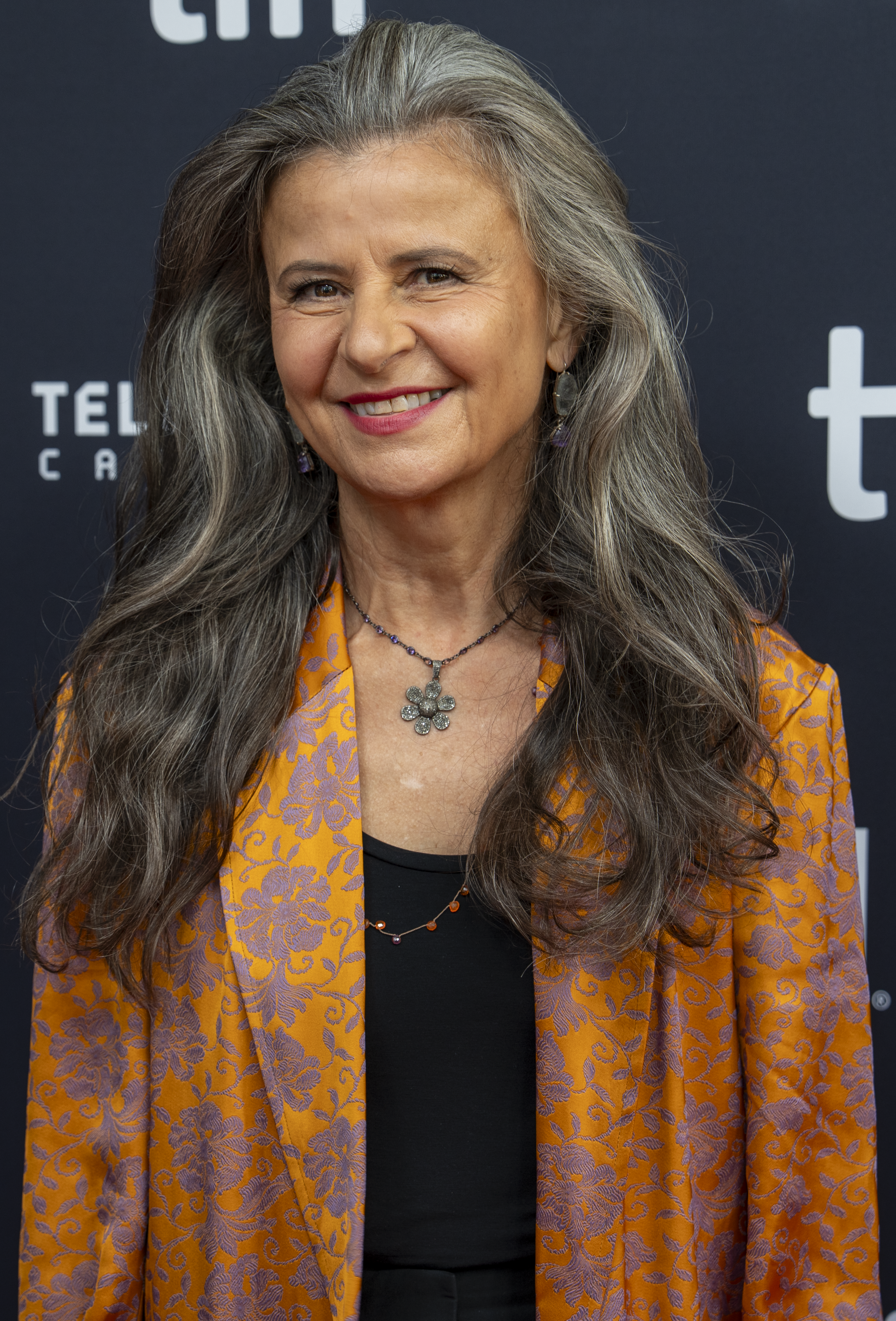
Tracey Ullman, Best Actress in a Supporting Role in a Series, Miniseries & Limited Series, or Motion Picture Made for Television winner

Winners are listed first and highlighted in bold.

Best Drama Series	Best Comedy or Musical Series
**Better Call Saul (AMC)**; Billions (Showtime); The Crown (Netflix); Killing Eve (BBC America); Ozark (Netflix); P-Valley (Starz)	**Schitt's Creek (Pop TV)**; The Boys (Prime Video); Dead to Me (Netflix); Insecure (HBO); Ramy (Hulu); What We Do in the Shadows (FX)
Best Genre Series	Best Miniseries & Limited Series
**The Haunting of Bly Manor (Netflix)**; Evil (CBS); His Dark Materials (HBO); The Mandalorian (Disney+); The Outsider (HBO); Pennyworth (eᴘix)	**The Good Lord Bird (Showtime)**; Mrs. America (FX on Hulu); Normal People (Hulu); The Queen's Gambit (Netflix); Small Axe (BBC One / Prime Video); The Undoing (HBO); Unorthodox (Netflix)
Best Actor in a Drama / Genre Series	Best Actress in a Drama / Genre Series
**Bob Odenkirk – Better Call Saul as Jimmy McGill / Saul Goodman / Gene Takavic**; Jason Bateman – Ozark as Marty Byrde; Damian Lewis – Billions as Robert "Bobby" Axelrod; Tobias Menzies – The Crown as Prince Philip, Duke of Edinburgh; Regé-Jean Page – Bridgerton as Simon Basset; Matthew Rhys – Perry Mason as Perry Mason	**Olivia Colman – The Crown as Queen Elizabeth II**; Caitríona Balfe – Outlander as Claire Fraser; Phoebe Dynevor – Bridgerton as Daphne Bridgerton; Laura Linney – Ozark as Wendy Byrde; Sandra Oh – Killing Eve as Eve Polastri; Maggie Siff – Billions as Wendy Rhoades
Best Actor in a Comedy or Musical Series	Best Actress in a Comedy or Musical Series
**Eugene Levy – Schitt's Creek as Johnny Rose**; Dave Burd – Dave as Himself; Ricky Gervais – After Life as Tony Johnson; Nicholas Hoult – The Great as Peter III of Russia; Jason Sudeikis – Ted Lasso as Ted Lasso; Ramy Youssef – Ramy as Ramy Hassan	**Elle Fanning – The Great as Catherine the Great**; Christina Applegate – Dead to Me as Jen Harding; Linda Cardellini – Dead to Me as Judy Hale; Zoë Kravitz – High Fidelity as Robyn "Rob" Brooks; Catherine O'Hara – Schitt's Creek as Moira Rose; Issa Rae – Insecure as Issa Dee
Best Actor in a Miniseries & Limited Series or Motion Picture Made for Television	Best Actress in a Miniseries & Limited Series or Motion Picture Made for Television
**Ethan Hawke – The Good Lord Bird as John Brown**; John Boyega – Small Axe as Leroy Logan; Bryan Cranston – Your Honor as Michael Desiato; Hugh Grant – The Undoing as Jonathan Fraser; Hugh Jackman – Bad Education as Frank Tassone; Chris Rock – Fargo as Loy Cannon; Mark Ruffalo – I Know This Much Is True as Dominick and Thomas Birdsey	**Cate Blanchett – Mrs. America as Phyllis Schlafly**; Shira Haas – Unorthodox as Esther "Esty" Shapiro; Nicole Kidman – The Undoing as Grace Fraser; Anya Taylor-Joy – The Queen's Gambit as Beth Harmon; Letitia Wright – Small Axe as Altheia Jones-LeCointe; Zendaya – Euphoria as Rue Bennett
Best Actor in a Supporting Role in a Series, Miniseries & Limited Series, or Motion Picture Made for Television	Best Actress in a Supporting Role in a Series, Miniseries & Limited Series, or Motion Picture Made for Television
**Jeff Wilbusch – Unorthodox as Moishe Lefkovitch**; Joshua Caleb Johnson – The Good Lord Bird as Henry "Onion" Shackleford; Josh O'Connor – The Crown as Charles, Prince of Wales; Tom Pelphrey – Ozark as Ben Davis; Donald Sutherland – The Undoing as Franklin Reinhardt; Ben Whishaw – Fargo as Rabbi Milligan	**Tracey Ullman – Mrs. America as Betty Friedan**; Gillian Anderson – The Crown as Margaret Thatcher; Jessie Buckley – Fargo as Oraetta Mayflower; Emma Corrin – The Crown as Diana, Princess of Wales; Hope Davis – Your Honor as Gina Baxter; Noma Dumezweni – The Undoing as Haley Fitzgerald
Best Motion Picture Made for Television
**The Clark Sisters: First Ladies of Gospel (Lifetime)**; Bad Education (HBO); Sylvie's Love (Prime Video); Uncle Frank (Prime Video)

=== Series with multiple nominations ===
Nominations	Series
6	The Crown
5	The Undoing
4	Ozark
3	Billions
3	Dead to Me
3	Fargo
3	The Good Lord Bird
3	Mrs. America
3	Schitt's Creek
3	Small Axe
3	Unorthodox
2	Bad Education
2	Better Call Saul
2	Bridgerton
2	The Great
2	Insecure
2	Killing Eve
2	The Queen's Gambit
2	Ramy
2	Your Honor

=== Series with multiple wins ===
Wins	Series
3	The Good Lord Bird
2	Better Call Saul
2	Mrs. America
2	Schitt's Creek
