= Ruin (disambiguation) =

Ruins are the remains of man-made architecture.

Ruins or ruin may refer to:

== History ==
- The Ruin (Ukrainian history), a period in Ukrainian history after the death of Bohdan Khmelnytsky in 1657

== Geography ==
- Ruin, Iran, a village in North Khorasan Province, Iran
- Ruin Rural District, an administrative subdivision of North Khorasan Province, Iran
- The Ruins (mansion), A historic mansion an iconic Philippine tourist attraction in Talisay City, Negros Occidental, Philippines.

== Arts, entertainment, and media ==
=== Films ===
- Ruins, a 1967 independent film by Clarke Mackey
- Ruins (film), a 2004 Slovenian film
- The Ruins (film), a 2008 horror film based on the 2006 novel of the same name

=== Television ===
- "Ruin" (Gotham), an episode of Gotham
- Real World/Road Rules Challenge: The Ruins, 18th season of The Challenge
- "The Ruins", an episode of Voltron: Legendary Defender

=== Literature ===
- Ruins (Card novel), a 2012 novel from the Pathfinder series by Orson Scott Card
- Ruins (Brooks-Dalton novel), a 2026 speculative fiction novel by Lily Brooks-Dalton
- Ruins, a 2014 novel by Dan Wells in the Partials Sequence series
- "The Ruin", an 8th-century Anglo-Saxon poem
- "The Ruin (Dafydd ap Gwilym poem)", a 14th-century Welsh poem
- The Ruins (novel), a 2006 horror novel set in the Yucatán, by Scott Smith

=== Music ===
==== Groups and labels ====
- Ruin (American band), an American thrash metal band
- Ruins (Australian band), an Australian black metal band
- Ruins (Japanese band), a Japanese drum-bass duo
- Ruin (punk band), an American punk band

==== Albums ====
- Ruin (album), a 2007 album by British metal band Architects
- Ruins (Dread Zeppelin album), 1996
- Ruins (Grouper album), 2014
- Ruins, a 2016 album by British psychedelic rock band Wolf People
- Ruins (First Aid Kit album), 2018

==== Songs ====
- "Ruins" (instrumental), by Henry Cow
- "Ruins", a song by English folk rock, singer-songwriter Cat Stevens
- "Ruins", a song by Australian singer Gabriella Cilmi
- "Ruins", a track from the soundtrack of the 2015 video game Undertale by Toby Fox
- "Ruin", a song by Shawn Mendes from Illuminate
- "Ruin", a song by Squarepusher from Music Is Rotted One Note

=== Other uses in arts, entertainment, and media ===
- Ruin (video game), a video game from SCE and Idol Minds cancelled mid-development
- Ruin, a.k.a. Professor Hamilton, a DC supervillain in Superman comics
- Ruins (comics), a 1995 comic book published by Marvel, written by Warren Ellis
- Real World/Road Rules Challenge: The Ruins, season 18 of the MTV reality TV game show
- Ruin, an expansion for the video game Five Nights at Freddy's: Security Breach

== See also ==
- Runes, letters of the Runic alphabets
