= Ruins (Brooks-Dalton novel) =

2026 novel by Lily Brooks-Dalton

- Author: Lily Brooks-Dalton
- Language: English
- Genre: Speculative fiction, climate fiction, adventure
- Publisher: Grand Central Publishing
- Publication date: March 31, 2026
- Media type: Print (hardcover, paperback), e-book, audiobook
- Pages: 400
- ISBN: 978-1-5387-7052-8

Ruins is a 2026 speculative fiction novel by American writer Lily Brooks-Dalton, published by Grand Central Publishing. It is Brooks-Dalton's fourth book and third novel, following Good Morning, Midnight (2016) and The Light Pirate (2022).

== Plot ==
The novel follows Professor Ember Agni, an archaeologist living in a society called the Commonwealth, a city situated on a fjord near the North Pole. Despite its far-northern location, snow is rare, and the city runs on hydroelectric power. There are no computers, automobiles, or air travel.

Ember is an academic who believes in the existence of a lost civilization that her colleagues dismiss. After a decade of trying to fund an expedition to prove her thesis, she receives word from a former student overseas who claims to have found an extraordinary artifact. Given funding and a twelve-person research team, Ember leads a voyage into uncharted and forbidden territory to search for conclusive evidence.

As the expedition progresses, Ember must confront both the dangers of the wilderness and the unraveling of her personal life, including a crumbling marriage. The novel explores themes of how cultures construct and control history, the fragility of collective memory, and the costs of obsessive ambition.

== Background ==
In an interview with the Los Angeles Public Library, Brooks-Dalton described the novel's origins: she had been thinking about how the current era would be recorded by future generations, and how physical and digital records might be interpreted by descendants.

== Reception ==
BookPage described the novel as a cleverly constructed mystery that rewards attentive reading. Bookreporter.com called it deeply captivating and praised Brooks-Dalton's handling of the themes of knowledge and discovery. The Between the Covers literary podcast at Milkweed Editions described the novel as both a page-turner and a character-driven work with an unforgettable protagonist.
