= Trish Summerville =

American costume designer

- Occupation: Costume designer
- Website: http://www.trishsummerville.com/

Trish Summerville is an American costume designer. She has received various accolades, including two Costume Designers Guild Awards, in addition to nominations for an Academy Award, a BAFTA Award and an Emmy Award. Summerville frequently collaborated with directors David Fincher and Francis Lawrence. Her film credits include The Girl with the Dragon Tattoo (2011), The Hunger Games: Catching Fire (2013), and Mank (2020), the lattermost of which earned her both an Academy Award for Best Costume Design and BAFTA Award for Best Costume Design nominations.

On television, Summerville has been nominated for an Primetime Emmy Award in the category Outstanding Costumes for a Period/Fantasy Series, Limited Series, or Movie for her work on the television series Westworld.

== Selected filmography ==
=== Film ===
Year	Title	Director
1998	Desert Blue	Morgan J. Freeman
1999	Clubland	Mary Lambert
2011	The Girl with the Dragon Tattoo	David Fincher
2013	The Hunger Games: Catching Fire	Francis Lawrence
2014	Gone Girl	David Fincher
2017	The Dark Tower	Nikolaj Arcel
2018	Red Sparrow	Francis Lawrence
2018	Boy Erased	Joel Edgerton
2019	Velvet Buzzsaw	Dan Gilroy
2020	Mank	David Fincher
2022	Slumberland	Francis Lawrence
2023	The Hunger Games: The Ballad of Songbirds & Snakes	Francis Lawrence
2025	Weapons	Zach Cregger
2026	Animals	Ben Affleck
2026	The Further Mis-Adventures of Cliff Booth	David Fincher

=== Television ===
Year	Title	Notes
2013	Ray Donovan	Episode: "The Bag or the Bat"
2016	Westworld	Episode: "The Original"
2019	See	4 episodes

== Awards and nominations ==
Major associations

Academy Awards

Year	Category	Nominated work	Result	Ref.
2021	Best Costume Design	Mank	Nominated	

BAFTA Awards

Year	Category	Nominated work	Result	Ref.
British Academy Film Awards
2021	Best Costume Design	Mank	Nominated	

Emmy Awards

Year	Category	Nominated work	Result	Ref.
Primetime Emmy Awards
2017	Outstanding Fantasy/Sci-Fi Costumes	Westworld (Episode: "The Original")	Nominated	

Miscellaneous awards

List of Trish Summerville other awards and nominations
Award	Year (Note: Indicates the year of ceremony. Each year is linked to the article about the awards held that year, wherever possible.)	Category	Title	Result	Ref.
Astra Film and Creative Arts Awards	2021	Best Costume Design	Mank	Nominated	
Chicago Film Critics Association Awards	2020	Best Costume Design	Mank	Nominated	
Costume Designers Guild Awards	2012	Excellence in Contemporary Film	The Girl with the Dragon Tattoo	Won	
Costume Designers Guild Awards	2014	Excellence in Fantasy Film	The Hunger Games: Catching Fire	Won	
Costume Designers Guild Awards	2015	Excellence in Contemporary Film	Gone Girl	Nominated	
Costume Designers Guild Awards	2017	Excellence in Period Television	Westworld (Episode: "Pilot")	Nominated	
Costume Designers Guild Awards	2019	Excellence in Contemporary Film	Red Sparrow	Nominated	
Costume Designers Guild Awards	2021	Excellence in Period Film	Mank	Nominated	
Costume Designers Guild Awards	2024	Excellence in Sci-Fi/Fantasy Film	The Hunger Games: The Ballad of Songbirds & Snakes	Nominated	
Costume Designers Guild Awards	2026	Excellence in Contemporary Film	Weapons	Nominated	
Critics' Choice Awards	2021	Best Costume Design	Mank	Nominated	
London Film Critics' Circle Awards	2014	Technical Achievement	The Hunger Games: Catching Fire	Nominated	
San Diego Film Critics Society Awards	2021	Best Costume Design	Mank	Nominated	
Satellite Awards	2021	Best Costume Design	Mank	Nominated	
Saturn Awards	2014	Best Costume Design	The Hunger Games: Catching Fire	Won	
Saturn Awards	2025	Best Costume Design	The Hunger Games: The Ballad of Songbirds & Snakes	Nominated	
Seattle Film Critics Society Awards	2021	Best Costume Design	Mank	Nominated	
