= Pathfinder (novel) =

2010 novel by Orson Scott Card

- 2010 first edition (hardcover)
- Author: Orson Scott Card
- Cover artist: Sammy Yuen, Jr.
- Language: English
- Series: The Pathfinder series
- Genre: Science fiction
- Publisher: Margaret K. McElderry
- Publication date: 2010
- Publication place: United States
- Media type: Print (Hardcover & Paperback)
- Pages: 672
- ISBN: 1-416-99179-4
- OCLC: 701013284
- Followed by: Ruins

Pathfinder (2010) is a science fiction novel by American author Orson Scott Card. The novel tells the story of Rigg and his unusual ability to perceive the "paths" of living things throughout time. It is the first book in the completed Pathfinder series, and is followed by Ruins and Visitors.

== Summary ==
People from Earth have colonized a new planet, giving it the name "Garden". This is accomplished with the assistance of human-like machines known as expendables. A select few of the colonists have gained unusual abilities, such as the ability to slow down time or the ability to jump forward into time. The narrative focuses on a boy named Rigg who has the ability to see the paths travelled in the past by any being, living or dead. After losing his father and mentor, Rigg sets out to meet his sister and mother he has never known.

== Plot overview ==
=== Ram ===
The first several paragraphs of each chapter deal with Ram and tell the story of how the humans got to Garden. Ram is a pilot of a ship meant to help keep the human race alive by jumping through space and landing on the new planet. Another ship is heading to the same or similar planet, it is not very clear. Because of something special about Ram, when they make the jump, the ship is sent backwards 11,191 years into the past, the date the calendar of Garden begins on. The ship is also divided into nineteen copies, plus one as one of them are going backward in time. The first several Ram sections deal with one of the backwards moving ships. Ram trying to figure out what went wrong, only he discovers nothing went wrong and they are on one of the backward moving ships. After, it goes to a Ram on a forwards moving ships, explaining what happened. Ram then orders for all the other Rams to be killed, unfortunately he isn't fast enough and another Ram gets to stay alive. This Ram must define what is human, so the expendables can fulfill their function correctly. He also gets to name the planet. He comes up with the decision to build the Walls before going into stasis. He gives the expendables one last command: that they have control of the colony until someone becomes intelligent enough to get through the Walls, after which they will have to become subservient again.

=== Rigg ===
Rigg lives with his father, trapping animals and being educated extensively for purposes unknown. One day Rigg finds his father dying, apparently impaled by a fallen tree. As he dies, he tells Rigg to go to the ancient city of Aressa Sessamo and find his sister Param and mother, and that the innkeeper Nox has incredibly valuable jewels for him that he will need on his journey. After evading a band of pursuers after being falsely accused of murder, he finds Nox and gets the jewels and some money. Rigg heads out of the city, but his childhood friend Umbo follows and demands to join him. During the journey to Aressa Sessamo, the pair learn that with Rigg's pathfinding skills and Umbo's ability to slow the perception of time, they can interact with the people of the past by focusing on specific points on their paths. Umbo is affected by the changes they make (for instance, when the time travelers accidentally create legends after being seen in the past, he remembers them), but Rigg is not, remembering things as they were before the past was altered.

After coming to Leaky's Landing, a small river town, they meet a former soldier by the name of Loaf. He agrees to take the boys to a city called O to sell one of the jewels for money. The city is along the way to their final destination so they agree. When the trio reaches O, they are arrested by General Citizen of the People's Republic. Rigg is accused of impersonating the lost prince Rigg Sessamakesh. Rigg infers from this that he actually is the prince Rigg, and was stolen at birth by the man he called his father, for purposes yet unknown. They are taken on a boat to Aressa Sessamo, but Umbo and Loaf are able to escape back to Leaky's Landing so Umbo can practice his ability to travel through time. The pair soon returns to O. Upon reaching Aressa Sessamo, Rigg meets his mother and sister for the first time. It is also revealed that the man that died under the tree, his mentor, was not his real father and his actual father is also dead. He finds that his sister, Param, has the ability to skip through time, making time pass much more slowly for her. While she is doing this she turns invisible, but she can be greatly harmed or even killed if something goes through her. Royals are clearly unliked by the current government of Aressa Sessamo, who overthrew royal rule long ago. Because of this, royals' lives are highly restricted and only Rigg and his mother know that Param is still alive. She spends almost all her time invisible.

After associating himself with the city and getting to know how things run while he is in captivity, Rigg decides to become a scholar and studies in the libraries for long hours every day. He befriends Olivenko, a city guard, and spends a lot of time with him at the libraries. Rigg's mother the Queen, now stripped of her rights and authority by the People's Republic, sets into motion a scheme to restore herself to the throne and have General Citizen become the king. They must have Rigg and Param killed to prevent them from competing with their claim. Meanwhile, Umbo and Loaf have made their way to Area Sessamo from O by land. They reunite with Rigg, Param, and Olivenko and escape the city together just in time. Traveling across the land away from the danger of Citizen and the Queen, they decide the only way to truly get away is to cross the wall, an invisible field that encircles the known world and drives all those who enter it insane. With their time manipulation powers, they travel backward to a time before the wall existed, although the ability to go back to the present rests with Umbo, who therefore cannot travel with them. Param, with her time-slicing ability, helps him escape with General Citizen and his soldiers at their backs.

The group sets out for food and water in the unknown region beyond the wall but meets a man identical to Rigg's adopted father from Fall Ford. He reveals that he and Rigg's father were robots (expendables) and that all the humans were descendants of colonists from Earth. He then says that the humans from Earth would be sending another ship shortly to make contact with them, setting in motion the plot of the next book.

== Writing process ==
In the acknowledgments at the end of the book, Card tells of a small part of the writing process. Unlike his other books, he wrote the chapters far apart and needed more help from his continuity editors than normal.

== Reception ==
Kirkus Reviews reports that the casual "sexist references and weird fascination with excretory functions" might turn readers away from the book, but "Card's many fans will be thrilled by this return to his literary roots"
