= The Pathfinder series =

Series of three books by Orson Scott Card

The Pathfinder series is a completed series of novels by Orson Scott Card that is notable for its unusual fusion of the themes of science fiction and fantasy, with some elements of historical fiction. One significant aspect of the Pathfinder series is its uniquely complex but well documented set of time travel rules.

== Plot ==
The narrative follows the adventures of a young man named Rigg, an unknowing colonist of a planet called Garden in a seemingly medieval state of scientific advancement. Rigg, at first a fur trapper's apprentice who has been educated in nearly every skill by a mysterious figure claiming to be his father, prominently exhibits a seemingly magical ability to see "paths" (hence the series' title), or the physical traces of living entities through time, to his benefit. Rigg and his companions, a band of unlikely friends, young and old, who have similar time-altering abilities, travel across Garden through many varied societies and environments to use their talents for personal benefit and heroics. The story line develops in parallel with another story which converges as the story of the colonization of Garden by Terrans some 11,000 years in the past.

== Reception ==
The series is critically acclaimed for its fast-paced, yet detailed, action, and the complex international power games that characterize much of Orson Scott Card's latest works. Some readers complained that the ending of the series felt "lazy" or weak, the writing uneven.

== Books in the series ==
- Pathfinder (2010)
- Ruins (2012)
- Visitors (2014)

== See also ==
- List of works by Orson Scott Card
