= David Watkins (special effects artist) =

British special effects artist

- Occupation: Special effects artist

David Watkins is a British special effects artist. He was nominated for an Academy Award in the category Best Visual Effects for the film The Midnight Sky.

== Selected filmography ==
- The Midnight Sky (2020; co-nominated with Matt Kasmir, Chris Lawrence and Max Solomon)
