= Max Solomon =

British animator and visual effects artist

- Occupation(s): Animator, visual effects artist

Max Solomon is a British animator and visual effects artist. He was nominated for an Academy Award in the category Best Visual Effects for the film The Midnight Sky.

== Selected filmography ==
- The Midnight Sky (2020; co-nominated with Matt Kasmir, Christopher Lawrence and David Watkins)
