= Visitors (Card novel) =

2014 novel by Orson Scott Card

- First edition
- Author: Orson Scott Card
- Cover artist: Sammy Yuen, Jr.
- Language: English
- Series: The Pathfinder series
- Genre: Science Fiction (Sci-Fi)
- Published: November 4, 2014
- Publisher: Simon Pulse
- Publication place: United States of America
- Media type: Print (Hardcover & Paperback)
- Preceded by: Ruins

Visitors is a science fiction novel by American author Orson Scott Card, who is best known for his novels, Ender's Game (1985) and Speaker for the Dead (1986). This novel continues the story of Rigg and his evolving ability to see and travel to the past, in an attempt to save the future. It is the third and final book of the Pathfinder series, preceded by Ruins and Pathfinder.

Visitors was published on November 4, 2014.

== Summary ==
In Visitors, Rigg, Umbo, and Param have determined that humans are the destroyers that bring about the end of their world. As they struggle to determine how to prevent the planet's impending doom, they are forced into an impossible moral dilemma: whether it is justified to sacrifice one world for another, especially when one of those worlds is Earth, the Cradle of Humanity. They travel through the history of Garden and each Wallfold, hoping to uncover the reason that the visitors from Earth will send the destroyers and attempting to prevent this outcome without having to destroy Earth preemptively. Their skills and abilities are put to the ultimate test as they try to end the war between worlds before it can begin in this epic and explosive conclusion.

== Plot Overview ==
The novel picks up where the events of Ruins left off: Ram, Rigg, Noxon (Rigg's duplicate from the future who has come back to prevent him from killing Ram Odin), and Vadeshex are in the control room discussing what to do about the seemingly inevitable arrival of the visitors from Earth, followed by the destroyers. They decide to send Noxon to Earth to attempt to prevent the destroyers from coming to Garden, while Rigg will stay on Garden to assess the wallfolds and help with the war in Ramfold.

=== Garden ===
Rigg explores every wallfold on Garden with Ram, in order to decide whether the walls should come down or each should be preserved without the influence of the others. Rigg eventually decides to do the latter.

Umbo escorts Loaf back to Leaky, hoping she will accept him with his facemask. Leaky attempts to take a facemask, but cannot master it, so a message from future Umbo warns them not to try it. When they return, he takes the opportunity to save his younger brother, Kyokay, from falling off a waterfall to his death, but has to do it over until he manages to isolate the effects from changing the events of Pathfinder. In the meantime, Leaky becomes pregnant. Umbo discovers that in a few years, Loaf and Leaky are able to have two children but are killed by Sessamid soldiers. Umbo brings their second child, Square, who was saved and hidden by neighbors, back to the past where he prevents their paths from leading to their demise and prevents Square's conception. They all travel back to Vadeshfold to meet with Param, Rigg, Ram, and an expendable to discuss their plans to save the world and overthrow the government of Ramfold.

Umbo and Param prepare to wage war on Param and Rigg's mother, Queen Hagia Sessamina and General Citizen Haddamander, in Ramfold. Olivenko serves as advisor after spending years studying all material on the starships about war. Loaf is made commander of the army they recruit from various villages in Ramfold, succeeded by Rigg, succeeded by Square. The group creates an enclosed area between wallfolds to house and train the army, and they decide to raid Ramfold villages on progressively older dates to maintain the element of surprise in each raid. After this, they defeat the Sessamid army in one large surprise battle. Queen Hagia requests a meeting for surrender where she plants a trap for Rigg and Param; however they begin slicing time rapidly to escape and go so far that they see the destroyers arrive. A small ship arrives to confront them after the apocalyptic event and Rigg defeats the centipede-like alien that emerges by duplicating himself many times over. Param and Rigg realize they must warn the others that the destroyers are not from Earth and so they bring the jeweled knife back to the ship.

=== Earth ===
After working on slicing time backwards with Param, Noxon decides to try attaching to the 20th copy of the starship that was sent to Garden - which is moving backwards in time, towards Earth - bringing a small group of sentient mice with him. After successfully shifting the backwards moving ship into the forward timeflow, he and Ram Odin reach Earth and hide the starship in the past. They visit Ram's friend, Professor Wheaton and his adopted daughter, Deborah. They take Wheaton, an anthropologist, back in time to witness Homo Erectus and Neanderthals's behaviors in order to sway him to help them save Garden. While in the past, Deborah is killed by a hunter, and the group decides to leave themselves a note warning about the outcome of the day trip and save a version of past-Deborah from the car crash that blinded her, killed her parents, but also put her in Wheaton's care. The entire group travels into the past to do this, keeping the current versions of Deborah and Wheaton alive in the main timeline and duplicating them. They visit Wheaton's duplicate and while slicing time, experience the world ending in a nuclear event. Ram and Noxon realize that the destroyers were not humans at all, but a sentient species from another planet. They decide to return to the starship and attempt to jump to the aliens’ planet in the past, preventing the evolution of the civilization which wipes out humanity and all life on Earth and Garden. They discover a binary system when they reach the aliens’ planet - one planet with an upright three-legged species, and one with a roach-like many-legged species. They establish wallfolds and colonies on each world before the aliens develop language or any technology, varying combinations of humans, sentient mice, and the two species of aliens in each wallfold. Another copy of Noxon returns to Garden with Deborah, where she tries a facemask to restore her eyes.

The heroes manage to prevent the version of the future in which the destroyers come to Earth and to Garden. Each of the characters and duplicates decides to live out the rest of their lives in a wallfold, using their time shaping powers minimally.

== Reception ==
Visitors received mixed reviews, scoring lower in ranking according to Goodreads than the previous two books in the series. The book was criticized by readers as being overly convoluted and being less engaging to the reader as the previous novels. While praised for its innovative look at science fiction and the possibilities of time travel and causality, something Orson Scott Card is known for, Visitors received heavy criticism over its rushed feel to the ending of its story, and the inconclusive side plot lines in the story.
