= Martin Ruhe =

German cinematographer

- Born: 1965 (age 60–61); Paderborn, North Rhine-Westphalia, West Germany
- Education: University of Seville
- Years active: 1994–present
- Website: ruhe.net

Martin Ruhe (born 1965) is a German cinematographer and a member of the American Society of Cinematographers.

== Early life and career ==
Ruhe became interested in cinema as a teenager and wanted to become a director. After graduating from school, he completed a two-year training course as a focus puller.

After moving to London, where he worked as a runner for a camera rental company, he became a cinematographer and filmed more than 200 music videos for artists like Herbert Grönemeyer, Depeche Mode and Coldplay as well as 350 advertising spots.

On the recommendation of Grönemeyer, Ruhe met Anton Corbijn, who engaged him for his biopic Control. Ruhe gained further prominence for his work on Harry Brown.

== Filmography ==
Film

Year	Title	Director
1998	Bonnie vs Clyde	Christian Weikert
2001	Ein Gottlicher Job	Thorsten Wettcke
2007	Control	Anton Corbijn
2009	The Countess	Julie Delpy
2009	Harry Brown	Daniel Barber
2010	The American	Anton Corbijn
2014	The Keeping Room	Daniel Barber
2015	Run All Night	Jaume Collet-Serra
2016	American Pastoral	Ewan McGregor
2020	The Midnight Sky	George Clooney
2021	The Tender Bar	George Clooney
2023	The Boys in the Boat	George Clooney
2025	The Amateur	James Hawes
2026	Luther 3 †	Jamie Payne

Television

Year	Title	Director	Notes
2002-2003	Balko	Uli Moller	2 episodes
2011	Page Eight	David Hare	TV movie
2017-2018	Counterpart	Morten Tyldum; Jennifer Getzinger; Stephen Williams; Alik Sakharov	5 episodes
2019	Catch-22	George Clooney; Grant Heslov; Ellen Kuras	Miniseries
2025	The Agency: Central Intelligence	Grant Heslov	Episodes "Hard Landing" and "Truth Will Set You Free"

== Awards and nominations ==
Year	Award	Category	Title	Result
2007	Camerimage	Golden Frog	Control	Nominated
2012	American Society of Cinematographers	Outstanding Achievement in Cinematography	Page Eight	Won
2020	American Society of Cinematographers	Outstanding Achievement in Cinematography	Catch-22	Nominated
2020	Satellite Awards	Best Cinematography	The Midnight Sky	Nominated
