= Ruins (Card novel) =

2012 novel by Orson Scott Card

- 2012 first edition (hardcover)
- Author: Orson Scott Card
- Cover artist: Sammy Yuen, Jr.
- Language: English
- Series: The Pathfinder series
- Genre: Science fiction
- Publisher: Simon Pulse
- Publication date: 2012
- Publication place: United States
- Media type: Print (Hardcover & Paperback)
- Pages: 672
- ISBN: 1-416-99177-8
- OCLC: 731911989
- Preceded by: Pathfinder
- Followed by: Visitors

Ruins (2012) is a science fiction novel by American author Orson Scott Card, who is best known for his novel Ender's Game. This novel is the second book in the Pathfinder series and continues the story of Rigg, and his strange powers, in the events proceeding Pathfinder. It is followed by Visitors (2014), the third in the trilogy. Ruins was published on October 30, 2012 by Simon Pulse.

== Summary ==
Rigg, Umbo, and Param escape through the wall, finally leaving Ramfold for the first time in their lives. In their ensuing journey through the other wallfolds and the past, they attempt to understand the history of life on Garden in order to avoid a future in which an enemy arrives to destroy the planet.

== Plot overview ==
The man they meet after crossing the wall that looks just like Rigg's father turns out to be the expendable for that fold, Vadesh. He cautions them against drinking the water because it contains a parasite that attaches to its prey in a form known as a facemask. His fold is devoid of people, and after Rigg and Umbo go back in time they realize that Vadesh incited a civil war between humans infected with facemasks and those without on the side of the facemasked people, eventually leading to everyone dying. As part of this time traveling Rigg realizes that he can jump through time without Umbo as well, though not to specific times.

After returning to the present (and distrustful of Vadesh) they seek answers in the crashed starship at the center of the wallfold. Rigg uses his jewels to take control of the ship, but not before Vadesh flips a genetically modified version of a facemask onto Loaf. Rigg takes on the role of acting admiral in lieu of Ram Odin, and learns that he has been chosen and trained to help navigate the first encounter of Garden with Earth since impact, a mere 11 years later for the following spaceships from Earth but following 11,000 years of curated evolution for Garden.

They make the decision to enter a third wallfold, Odinfold, and meet two natives, Mouse-Breeder and Swims-in-the-Air. They reveal that they were given substantially more technological information, and have both modified the fields of the Wall and learned to send items to the past. Through this, they received the Book of the Future from a future Odinfold, detailing what happened when the Visitors from Earth arrived: they came, they saw, they left, and eleven months after arriving Destroyers were sent to burn the surface of the planet. After discarding the possibility of war Odinfolders dedicated themselves to trying to get them to reach a different conclusion. Countless changes led to countless more books of failure from the future, with their tenth and current try involving breeding mice to serve as their technological base, and using their time traveling transporter to adjust pregnancies to bring about Rigg and Param and Umbo's time powers (along with revealing that Umbo's genetic father was a displacer from Odinfold).

Loaf's facemask attunes him to the hypersonic voices that the mice use to communicate, and he learns that they are the true intelligence of Odinfold, and they are doing the current time shifting with Ram's genes in them. They escape Odinfold with the mice into Larfold, where Larex introduces them to the natives who have pairbonded with a water version of the facemask they call mantles. They reveal that Param and Rigg's father, Knosso, who seemed to have drowned trying to travel under the Wall was instead just given a mantle and is still alive. After reuniting Rigg realizes that the constant lies from the expendables only make sense if someone is giving higher level orders, and concludes that one of the Ram's has survived in Vadeshfold. Rigg returns alone and dons a facemask which grants him the ability to replicate Umbo and Param's powers. He concludes that Ram is the one calling the Destroyers to raze Garden, and using his facemask-enhanced speed and time travel kills him. Unfortunately the Destroyers still come, and Rigg goes back in time to stop his previous self from killing Ram, leaving two Riggs in the world. The previous version decides to call himself Rigg Noxon after his surrogate mother, and the book ends.

== Reception ==
Ruins received slightly less favorable reviews than Pathfinder. It was praised for the complexity and the handling of time-travel but criticized for repetitiveness of dialogue, the squabbling of the main characters, and slow pacing.
