= The Midnight Sky =

2020 science fiction film by George Clooney

- Official release poster
- Directed by: George Clooney
- Screenplay by: Mark L. Smith
- Based on: Good Morning, Midnight by Lily Brooks-Dalton
- Produced by: Grant Heslov; George Clooney; Keith Redmon; Bard Dorros; Cliff Roberts
- Starring: George Clooney; Felicity Jones; David Oyelowo; Tiffany Boone; Demián Bichir; Kyle Chandler; Caoilinn Springall
- Cinematography: Martin Ruhe
- Edited by: Stephen Mirrione
- Music by: Alexandre Desplat
- Production companies: Smokehouse Pictures; Anonymous Content
- Distributed by: Netflix
- Release date: December 11, 2020
- Running time: 118 minutes
- Country: United States
- Language: English
- Budget: $100 million
- Box office: $3 million

The Midnight Sky is a 2020 American science fiction film directed by George Clooney based on the 2016 novel Good Morning, Midnight by Lily Brooks-Dalton. The script was written by Mark L. Smith. Clooney plays a leading role in his film, as an aging scientist who must venture across the frigid Arctic Circle to warn off a returning interplanetary spaceship following a global catastrophe on Earth. Felicity Jones, David Oyelowo, Tiffany Boone, Demián Bichir, Kyle Chandler, and Caoilinn Springall also star in this film.

The Midnight Sky began a limited theatrical release on December 11, 2020, before being released on Netflix on December 23. It received mixed reviews from critics but was named one of the ten best films of 2020 by the National Board of Review. At the 93rd Academy Awards, the film was nominated for Best Visual Effects, but lost to Tenet.

== Plot ==
Reclusive academic Augustine Lofthouse has devoted his life to finding habitable planets so that humanity can expand. He meets Jean Sullivan after giving a presentation at a gala and they form a romantic relationship. After a pregnancy scare, she leaves him due to his work obsession and inability to bond with others. Several years later, when Lofthouse encounters Jean again, she tells him about their daughter, whom he chooses not to meet.

Thirty years later, in 2049, an event has obliterated most of Earth's population and left the surface contaminated with ionizing radiation. Lofthouse is the only person inhabiting a large Arctic base. A flashback shows him refusing to join the evacuation, knowing that he does not have long to live due to an unidentified serious illness requiring hemodialysis and medical equipment at the base.

Lofthouse searches the base's computer systems for active crewed space missions to warn about the situation on Earth and finds only one: the interplanetary craft Aether, returning from an exploration of Jupiter's habitable moon K-23, which Lofthouse discovered.

In the meantime, the crew of Aether are oblivious to events on Earth and believe that they have lost contact due to faulty communications systems. Lofthouse finds that his antenna is too weak to contact them, even after calculating them to be in range.

Along with his deteriorating physical health, Lofthouse is experiencing mental blackouts. After a kitchen fire, he finds a young mute girl hiding in the kitchen. He tries to contact the evacuees to get someone to get her, to no avail. The girl draws an iris and Lofthouse deduces that this is her name.

Lofthouse grows fond of Iris, and they travel together on a snowmobile to another base which has a larger, more powerful antenna. En route, in an accident, he loses his medical equipment and snowmobile. Arriving at the base on foot, he manages to make contact with Aether, but an asteroid field damages the ship's radar and communication systems, breaking the contact.

To repair the damage, mission specialist Sully, currently pregnant, and her partner, Commander Adewole, conduct a spacewalk with flight engineer Maya. They repair the communications and radar but are caught in a second asteroid field that fatally injures Maya.

Sully contacts Lofthouse. He tells her not to return to Earth because of the disaster, but go back to K-23 and start a new life there. Aether's pilot, Tom Mitchell, refuses, but upon discovering his wife's final words and seeing the state of Earth's atmosphere, he understands that it is in the crew's best interests to go back to Jupiter's moon. Still, he chooses to use one of the two re-entry vehicles to return to Earth. Sanchez, who saw Maya as a second daughter, decides to accompany him and bury her body on Earth.

In her final communication with Lofthouse, Sully tells him that he was one of the reasons she joined NASA. She thanks him, telling him that her mother Jean had given her a moon rock from him, and that her full name is Iris Sullivan. Lofthouse says he already knew her name, making it clear that the young girl he had been seeing was not real. When asked how he ended up at the base from which he contacted Aether, he says he thought he might be able to "help someone".

Lofthouse tells Sully he is proud to have finally met her, and she describes K-23 to him. Her description transports him there in his imagination and he falls out of radio contact. Sully and Adewole are left with nothing but to return to K-23.

== Cast ==
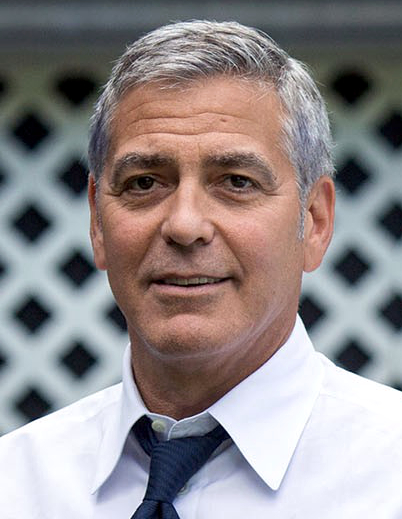
George Clooney directed and starred in the film.

- George Clooney as Augustine Lofthouse
- Felicity Jones as Iris "Sully" Sullivan
- David Oyelowo as Gordon Adewole
- Tiffany Boone as Maya Lawrence
- Demián Bichir as Sanchez
- Kyle Chandler as Tom Mitchell
- Caoilinn Springall as young Iris
- Sophie Rundle as Jean Sullivan
- Ethan Peck as younger Augustine Lofthouse
- Miriam Shor as Tom Mitchell's wife
- Tim Russ as Mason Mosley
- Eysis Clacken as Rachel
- Tia Bannon as Jasmine
- Sam Bond as Father in Plane

== Production ==
=== Development and pre-production ===
The film was announced in June 2019, with George Clooney directing and starring. Netflix would distribute, with filming set to begin in October. Felicity Jones was added to the cast in July. Jones became pregnant sometime after having been cast. Clooney opted to rewrite her character as pregnant versus using a body double. Kyle Chandler and David Oyelowo joined the cast in August. Tiffany Boone and Caoilinn Springall were added in October. In November 2019, Demián Bichir joined the cast of the film. Sophie Rundle, Ethan Peck, Tim Russ and Miriam Shor were announced as being added in January 2020.

=== Filming ===
Filming began on October 21, 2019, in England, and finished in Iceland on February 7, 2020. The scene that takes place in a blizzard was filmed in 50 miles per hour (80 km/h) winds with temperatures at −40 °F (−40 °C). Some shooting also took place at La Palma, in the Canary Islands. For his role, Clooney lost 25 pounds (11 kg). Scenes set on Earth and involving Clooney were shot before the end of 2019, while scenes set in space were shot after the production's Christmas break.

The film was shot with Arri Alexa 65 cameras (the digital equivalent of 65mm film) with the intent of screening it in IMAX theatres. Because of the COVID-19 pandemic, this never occurred. Industrial Light & Magic also provided the StageCraft virtual production technology that was used on The Mandalorian, with a wall using LED panels allowing backgrounds to be rendered using Unreal Engine 4, with two LED walls built around the observatory set.

== Release ==
The film had a limited theatrical release on December 11, 2020, and was released digitally on December 23. It was the most-watched film on Netflix over its first five days. The film remained in the top 10 for its first 12 days of release. Netflix later revealed that the film was seen by 72 million households during its first week. In March 2021, Variety reported the film was the most-watched among Netflix's Oscar-nominated titles, and assigned it an "audience appeal score" of 98 out 100.

== Reception ==
The Midnight Sky received some praise for its "ambition and emotional tone", though it was compared unfavorably to other science fiction films.

On the review aggregator website Rotten Tomatoes, 49% of 252 critics' reviews are positive, with an average rating of 5.7/10. The website's consensus reads: "The Midnight Sky lacks the dramatic heft to match its narrative scale, but its flaws are often balanced by thoughtful themes and a poignant performance from director-star George Clooney." Metacritic, which uses a weighted average, assigned the film a score of 58 out of 100, based on 42 critics, indicating "mixed or average" reviews.

Alonso Duralde of TheWrap wrote, "There's a lot that's frustrating about George Clooney's new film The Midnight Sky, from its egregious borrowing from any number of better movies to its pacing issues, but thanks to a few grace notes, its shortcomings are mostly forgivable". Leah Greenblatt of Entertainment Weekly gave the film a "B", and described it as "a dystopian drama whose fluctuating tone—grim, with flickers of hopeful sentiment—feels almost comfortingly familiar, if a little on the nose for 2020."

The Wall Street Journal reviewer Joe Morganstern gave the film a warm review but added, "The film isn't perfect. The narrative piles crisis upon crisis, from a fat fire in the observatory kitchen to spectacular repair efforts in space and a startling sequence that involves droplets of blood. The pace, paradoxically, can be awfully slow, but it may seem less so to home viewers with plenty of time and patience; the metabolic rate of motion pictures will be changing in the streaming era, to an extent we can't foresee." Brian Tallerico of RogerEbert.com reviewed the film more harshly and gave it two stars, concluding, "The heart of this movie just isn't there. It's as weightless as space."

== Accolades ==
Award	Date of ceremony	Category	Recipient(s)	Result	Ref.
Hollywood Music in Media Awards	January 27, 2021	Best Original Score in a Feature Film	Alexandre Desplat	Nominated	
Satellite Awards	February 15, 2021	Best Art Direction and Production Design	Jim Bissell and John Bush	Nominated	
Satellite Awards	February 15, 2021	Best Cinematography	Martin Ruhe	Nominated	
Satellite Awards	February 15, 2021	Best Original Score	Alexandre Desplat	Won	
Satellite Awards	February 15, 2021	Best Sound (Mixing and Editing)	Randy Thom, Dan Hiland, Todd Beckett, Danny Hambrook & Bjorn Schroeder	Nominated	
Satellite Awards	February 15, 2021	Best Visual Effects	Mark Bakowski, Georgina Street and Jill Brooks	Nominated	
Golden Globe Awards	February 28, 2021	Best Original Score	Alexandre Desplat	Nominated	
Hollywood Critics Association Awards	March 5, 2021	Best Cinematography	Martin Ruhe	Nominated	
Hollywood Critics Association Awards	March 5, 2021	Best Score	Alexandre Desplat	Nominated	
Hollywood Critics Association Awards	March 5, 2021	Best Visual Effects	Matt Kasmir, Chris Lawrence, Dave Watkins, and Max Solomon	Nominated	
Critics' Choice Movie Awards	March 7, 2021	Best Score	Alexandre Desplat	Nominated	
Critics' Choice Movie Awards	March 7, 2021	Best Young Actress	Caoilinn Springall	Nominated	
Critics' Choice Movie Awards	March 7, 2021	Best Visual Effects	Mark Bakowski, Georgina Street and Jill Brooks	Nominated	
Austin Film Critics Association	March 19, 2021	Best Motion Capture/Special Effects Performance	Matt Kasmir	Nominated	
Set Decorators Society of America Awards	March 31, 2021	Best Achievement in Décor/Design of a Science Fiction or Fantasy Feature Film	John Bush and Jim Bissell	Nominated	
Visual Effects Society Awards	April 6, 2021	Outstanding Visual Effects in a Photoreal Feature	Matt Kasmir, Greg Baxter, Chris Lawrence, Max Solomon, Dave Watkins	Won	
Visual Effects Society Awards	April 6, 2021	Outstanding Model in a Photoreal or Animated Project	Michael Balthazart, Jonathan Opgenhaffen, John-Peter Li, Simon Aluze (for Aether)	Won	
Art Directors Guild Awards	April 10, 2021	Excellence in Production Design for a Fantasy Film	Jim Bissell	Nominated	
British Academy Film Awards	April 11, 2021	Best Special Visual Effects	Matt Kasmir, Chris Lawrence and David Watkins	Nominated	
Motion Picture Sound Editors Awards	April 16, 2021	Outstanding Achievement in Sound Editing – Sound Effects and Foley for Feature Film	Bjørn Schroeder, Randy Thom, Kyrsten Mate, Leff Lefferts, Nicholas Docter, Shelley Roden and John Roesch	Nominated	
Motion Picture Sound Editors Awards	April 16, 2021	Outstanding Achievement in Sound Editing – Feature Underscore	Michael Alexander and Peter Clarke	Nominated	
Academy Awards	April 25, 2021	Best Visual Effects	Matt Kasmir, Christopher Lawrence, Max Solomon, and David Watkins	Nominated	
