= Good Morning, Midnight (Brooks-Dalton novel) =

2016 novel by Lily Brooks-Dalton

- First edition
- Author: Lily Brooks-Dalton
- Publisher: Random House

Good Morning, Midnight is the debut novel of Lily Brooks-Dalton. It was published in 2016 by Random House.

Narrated in the present and in flashbacks, and following groups of characters in two different settings (the Arctic and outer space), the novel's plot is about an astronomer who may be the last human being on Earth after an unidentified disaster and the space mission that tries to return to the planet after a year without contact with Mission control center.

Both Shelf Awareness and the Chicago Review of Books included Good Morning, Midnight on their lists of the best novels of 2016.

George Clooney directed and acted in a 2020 film adaptation, The Midnight Sky.

== Plot summary ==
Good Morning, Midnight's narrative voice alternates between two main characters and ambiences.

One is Augustine, an astronomer in his late 70s who lives and works on Barbeau's Observatory, a research station in the Arctic Circle. The other is Sullivan, one of the astronauts aboard Aether, a space station returning from an expedition to Jupiter.

On Earth, rumors of an unexplained war begin to spread and Augustine's research facility is evacuated. He refuses to leave and remains in the frozen station hoping to die alone.

One year after the evacuation, Augustine has lost all connection with the outside world. At the same time, he discovers that a little girl named Iris has also been abandoned there, after a possible confusion during the evacuation.

Meanwhile, the astronauts on Aether also lose communication with Mission Control and are frightened and anxious as the entire planet has suddenly gone silent. There are five other astronauts aboard besides Sullivan: Devi, Harper, Thebes, Ivanov, and Tal.

Halfway through the story, Devi dies in an accident: her suit's breathing system fails while she and Sullivan make repairs to the space station's exterior.

Near the end of the book, Augustine and Iris take a near-suicide journey to another station farther away from their current one, where there's a more powerful radio antenna to try to communicate with the rest of the world.

By sheer accident, he makes contact with the Aether. He explains the planet's situation to Sullivan, leaving the astronauts wondering what to do.

The novel's last page reveals that astronaut Sullivan is the daughter Augustine abandoned in the past, and the little girl in the Arctic is his hallucination.

== Background ==
In a 2016 interview, Brooks-Dalton explained where the idea for the book came from:

I was working at a radio station when I thought of the initial idea. It was in the northeast, and when we had lots of snow someone had to be responsible for periodically going outside and knocking the snow off the transmitter, otherwise it would muffle the signal and we would go off the air. That image, of someone all alone in an empty radio station, keeping the signal alive, stuck with me. Eventually it became this book.

In another interview with the Chicago Review of Books, Brooks-Dalton explained that one of her inspirations was exploring gender roles in parenthood and the differences between how men and women feel guilt over the abandonment of their children:

The expectations of what women should value and what they are responsible for have permeated our culture for so long that it makes me wonder: if we all woke up in a totally different society tomorrow, would these gender disparities still exist? And how long would it take for those stigmas to fade? A decade? A generation?

In addition to the narrative interspersed between post-apocalyptic Earth and the space station, certain parts of Good Morning, Midnight also go back in time to tell the past of Augustine and Sullivan.

Augustine was a boy with a traumatic childhood who became a womanizer as an adult and dedicated himself exclusively to the Cosmos. He abandoned the love of his life when she became pregnant, and did not keep in touch with her or their daughter.

Sullivan represents the other side of the coin: the astronaut grew up with an absent, divorced mother who only thought about work. Married a second time, her mother neglected her children in favour of her new husband.

Brooks-Dalton left the nature of the disaster in the book unexplained. In a 2016 interview, she justified her choice:

For me and for this story specifically, the minutia of whether humanity falls by way of epidemic or warfare or asteroid or climate change was so much less interesting than what happens after. I wanted to keep the focus on the characters, to detail the emotional and psychological toll of such a catastrophe without dropping into the mechanics of how the world might continue in the wake of it. I was most interested in the individual issues, as opposed to the social. There are lots of fantastic post-apocalyptic books that delve into social issues — I wanted to write something with a different focus.

Unlike the film adaptation released four years later, the novel ends without Augustine and Sullivan ever knowing they are father and daughter.

About this decision to keep the characters' identities a secret shared only with readers, the author explained:

In the first draft I think they did figure it out — maybe not both of them, but I think Augustine at least knew. My agent questioned that, and as soon as she did I realized that it was totally unnecessary. It's not important that they know; it's important that they begin to make different choices. That they find their own paths to redemption. In the end, they don't need each other to do that, but I loved the idea of this bigger-than-them moment in which they do finally have this one chance to intersect, and yet the mystery remains.

== Film adaptation ==
Actor-director George Clooney acquired the movie rights to the novel in June 2019. Clooney directed and acted in the adaptation, entitled The Midnight Sky. Mark L. Smith, screenwriter for The Revenant, wrote the screenplay.

The Midnight Sky has several differences from the book.

The plot now takes place in 2049 and Augustine (played by Clooney himself) has a terminal illness that forces him to undergo hemodialysis sessions.

The astronomer has been able to communicate with Aether since the beginning of the story, but the contact between them is cut off by distance. That is what forces Augustine to take a journey to another distant station with more modern radio equipment.

Unlike the book, the space mission is returning from an expedition to Jupiter that aimed to investigate conditions for humanity to colonize one of the planet's moons.

Sullivan (played by Felicity Jones) has a relationship with the captain of the space mission and is pregnant with their child – a last-minute addition to the plot after the actress became pregnant in real life.

In the end, also unlike the book, Augustine reveals to the astronauts that the world was destroyed by a toxic cloud and became uninhabitable.

Two of them decide to return to Earth anyway to find out what happened to their families, while Sullivan and her companion decide to change course back to Jupiter and restart civilization on a new planet.
