= Matt Kasmir =

British visual effects artist

- Occupation: Visual effects artist

Matt Kasmir is a British visual effects artist. He was nominated for an Academy Award in the category Best Visual Effects for the film The Midnight Sky.

== Selected filmography ==
- The Midnight Sky (2020; co-nominated with Christopher Lawrence, Max Solomon and David Watkins)
