= Lily Brooks-Dalton =

American novelist

- Born: August 18, 1987 (age 38) Brattleboro, Vermont, U.S.
- Occupation: Writer
- Education: University of Massachusetts Amherst (BA); Portland State University (MFA)

Lily Brooks-Dalton (born August 18, 1987) is an American writer. She is most recently the author of Ruins (2026) and The Light Pirate, which was the Runner-Up for the Dayton Literary Peace Prize in 2023 and a Good Morning America book club pick. Her first novel, Good Morning, Midnight, was made into the film The Midnight Sky and her memoir, Motorcycles I've Loved, was a finalist for the Oregon Book Award.

== Early life and education ==
She was born and raised in southern Vermont. She left high school at 15 and received her Associate Degree at 17 from the Community College of Vermont. Brooks-Dalton later earned a BA at the University of Massachusetts Amherst and a MFA at Portland State University.

== Career ==
Her first book, Motorcycles I've Loved: A Memoir, published in 2015 by Riverhead, was a finalist for the Oregon Book Award. Her second book and first novel, Good Morning, Midnight, was published the next year by Random House and has been translated into twenty languages, with a film adaptation released as The Midnight Sky in December 2020, starring and directed by George Clooney. Her third book, The Light Pirate, also a novel, was published in 2022. Her most recent novel is called Ruins (2026).

== Works ==
- Motorcycles I've Loved: A Memoir. Riverhead/Penguin Random House, New York 2014, ISBN 978-1-59463-321-8.
- Good Morning, Midnight. Random House, New York 2016, ISBN 978-0-8129-9889-4.
- The Light Pirate. Grand Central Publishing, New York 2022. ISBN 978-1-5387-0827-9.
- Ruins. Grand Central Publishing, New York 2026. ISBN 978-1-5387-7052-8.
