= Chris Lawrence (visual effects) =

UK visual effects artist (1979-)

- Occupation: Visual effects supervisor
- Years active: 2002–present

Chris Lawrence is a visual effects supervisor. Lawrence and his fellow visual effects artists received an Academy Award for Best Visual Effects for the 2013 film, Gravity. In 2016, Lawrence received his second Academy Award nomination for his work on the film, The Martian, at the 88th Academy Awards. In 2018, he received his third Academy Award nomination for his work on the film, Christopher Robin, at the 91st Academy Awards, and received his fourth nomination in 2021, at the 93rd Academy Awards for the 2020 Netflix film The Midnight Sky. He is the eldest son and heir apparent of Sir Henry Lawrence, 7th Baronet of Lucknow.

== Filmography ==
- IF, production VFX Supervisor
- The Midnight Sky, VFX Supervisor at Framestore
- Christopher Robin, production VFX Supervisor
- Kingsman: The Golden Circle, VFX Supervisor at Framestore
- The Martian, VFX Supervisor at Framestore
- Jupiter Ascending, VFX Supervisor at Framestore
- Gravity, CG Supervisor at Framestore
