= Age of Oil =

Era in history

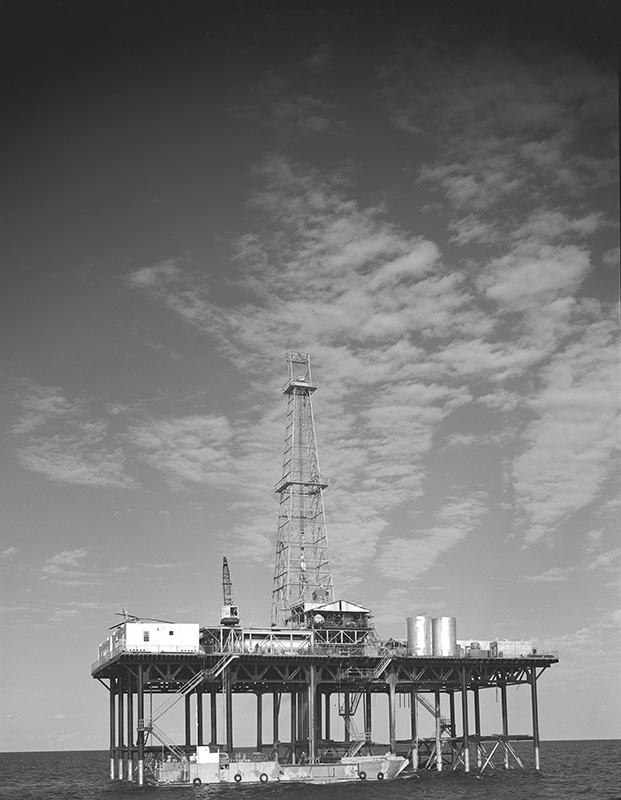
Offshore oil well drilling platform Continental Oil Co., C.A.T.C., Gulf of Mexico, 1955.

The Age of Oil, also known as the Oil Age, the Petroleum Age, or the Oil Boom, refers to the era in human history characterised by an increased use of petroleum in products and as fuel. Though unrefined petroleum has been used for various purposes since ancient times, it was during the 19th century that refinement techniques were developed and gasoline engines were created.

Although crude petroleum oil has been used for a variety of purposes for thousands of years, historians generally consider the Oil Age to have started in the mid-1800s with the advance of drilling techniques and the commencement of the US oil boom. Alternatively, the age of oil can be placed in the first period until the early 1900s, when oil consumption and combustion engines utilization increased. Contemporary industrial society is built largely on petroleum resources, but the future of the Oil Age has become increasingly controversial as the effects of climate change have become apparent, and use of alternative energy sources increases.

== History ==
Since the beginning of the Industrial Revolution, fossil fuels have been used as sources of energy. Coal began to be widely used after 1800 and would continue to be the dominant source of fuel into the 20th century. However, two events set the stage for the Age of Oil: The first was in 1846, when Abraham Gesner invented kerosene making coal and petroleum practical raw materials for lighting fuel. The second was in 1859, when Edwin Drake invented the first modern drilling process for deep oil wells. John Davison Rockefeller founded the Standard Oil Company, which dominated the oil industry and was the first great U.S. business trust. He founded the company in 1870, and aggressively ran it until he officially retired in 1897. Karl Friedrich Benz developed petrol-powered automobiles by 1878 and, in 1879, obtained a patent for the practical automobile. The invention of the internal combustion engine was the major influence in the rise in the importance of petroleum.

The beginning of the contemporaneous age of oil is commonly thought of originating in 1901 with the strike at Spindletop by Croatian oil explorer Antun Lučić and Texan Patillo Higgins, near Beaumont, Texas in the United States which launched large-scale oil production and soon made the petroleum products widely available.

Powered by the increased use of petroleum, the post–World War II economic expansion was a period of economic prosperity in the mid-20th century which occurred, following the end of World War II in 1945, and lasted until the early 1970s. It ended with the 1973 oil crisis. In 1956, Geophysicist M. King Hubbert deduced that U.S. oil production would peak between 1965 and 1970 (peaked in 1971) and that oil production would peak "within half a century" on the basis of 1956 data. In 1989, another peak was predicted by Colin Campbell

Since the 1960s and 1970s, when petroleum production peaked in many industrialized nations, a frequent topic of speculation among scholars has been when worldwide production will peak, as well as when and how the oil age will ultimately end. According to some definitions the age is defined as ending at the point where consumption outstrips the decreasing production making its use unprofitable or impossible.

Oil price trend, 1861–2007, both nominal and adjusted to inflation.

=== Contemporary oil ===
With the dawning of the so-called Atomic Age many observers in the mid-20th century believed that the Oil Age was rapidly coming to an end. The rapid change to atomic power envisioned during this period never materialized, in part due to environmental fears following high-profile accidents such as the 1979 Three Mile Island accident, the 1986 Chernobyl disaster and the 2011 Fukushima nuclear disaster.

Peak oil is the point in time when the maximum rate of petroleum extraction is reached, after which the rate of production is expected to enter terminal decline. Many believe that we are at or close to the peak, positioning us in the second half of the oil age. Some estimate, assuming current consumption rates, current oil reserves will last through at least the year 2040. In 2004, OPEC estimated, with substantial investments, it would nearly double oil output by 2025.

== See also ==
General
Wheeler No. 1 Oil Well, Edward L. Doheny, Texas Oil Boom, History of the petroleum industry in Canada, History of the Venezuelan oil industry

Fuels
Fossil fuel, Unconventional oil, Oil sands, Oil shale reserves

Gluts and crisis
Price of petroleum, 1980s oil glut, 1980–1989 world oil market chronology, 1979 energy crisis, Oil price increases since 2003, Oil depletion

Business
Chronology of world oil market events (1970–2005), Company man, Drilling Fluids Engineer, Major Drilling Group International

Drilling
Extraction of petroleum, Oil well (Oil well drilling, Oil Driller), Well drilling (Drilling), Drilling rig (Wellhead, Drill string), Oil platform, Drillship, Oil well Dog House, Submersible pump, Well logging, Wellbore, Relief well, Oil well control, Completion (oil and gas wells), Pore pressure gradient, Offshore drilling, Deepwater drilling, Drilling fluid

Other
Resource curse, Oil reserves in Saudi Arabia, Problems in oil well drilling, Oil imperialism, Energy Slave

Alternatives
Natural gas, Renewable energy, Renewable energy commercialization, History of renewable energy

== References and notes ==
Citations
