= Doghouse (disambiguation) =

A doghouse or dog house is a small shed commonly built in the shape of a little house intended for a dog.

Doghouse may also refer to:

- Doghouse (film), a 2009 British comedy horror film
- Doghouse Records, a record label
- Dog House (TV series), a 1990–91 Canadian comedy program
- "Doghouse" (song), a 1994 song by No Doubt
- Dunay radar, which has a NATO reporting name of Dog House
- "Doghouse", a song by Neil Young from the album Bluenote Café
- Oil well dog house, control room in the offshore industry
- Dog House (song), a 2025 song by Drake, Julia Wolf and Yeat

== See also ==
- In the Doghouse (disambiguation)
- The Dog House (disambiguation)
