= TCC =

TCC may refer to:

== Companies ==
- Taiwan Cement Corporation
- The Clearing Corporation
- Trammell Crow Company
- Travancore Cochin Chemicals, Kochi, Kerala, India
- TCC (Uruguay)

== Organizations ==
- Tanana Chiefs Conference
- Theory of Cryptography Conference
- Technology and Construction Court
- Territorial Center of Recruitment and Social Support
- Texas Cryptologic Center
- Toronto Congress Centre
- Travelers' Century Club
- Tri-County Conference (disambiguation)
- True Catholic Church
- Tucson Convention Center
- Tunisian Community Center
- Tysons Corner Center
- The Carter Center
- The Country Club (Philippines), a golf club
- Territorial Congress Committees, of the Indian National Congress

== Colleges and education ==
- Tacoma Community College
- Tallahassee Community College
- Tarrant County College
- Texas Chiropractic College
- Tidewater Community College
- Torpoint Community College
- Traverse City Central High School
- Trinity Catholic College, Lismore
- Trinity Christian College
- Trinity College, Cambridge
- Tulsa Community College
- Trinity College Colac

== Science, technology, and medicine ==
- Terminal complement complex, the membrane attack complex of the complement system
- Thermomechanical Cuttings Cleaner
- Total contact casting, a specially designed cast designed to take weight of the foot
- Torque converter clutch
- Transitional cell carcinoma, which affects the bladder
- Trewartha climate classification, a climate classification system
- Triclocarban, a disinfectant
- TCC, a codon for the amino acid serine

=== Computing ===
- Take Command Console, a command line interpreter by JP Software
- Tiny C Compiler, a C compiler

== Television channels ==
- The Catholic Channel
- The Children's Channel
- The Comedy Channel
- The Cowboy Channel

== Music and entertainment ==
- The Classic Crime
- The Closing Chronicles
- Toronto Children's Chorus
- Turtle Creek Chorale
- Harry Potter and the Cursed Child
- Ten Crack Commandments

== Other uses ==
- Tax Court of Canada
- Transnational capitalist class
- Tucumcari Municipal Airport (IATA airport code)
- True Crime Community (TCC), a term for fandoms centered around true crime, serial killers, or mass murderers
