= The Dog House =

The Dog House may refer to:

- Doghouse, a small shed commonly built in the shape of a little house intended for a dog
- The Dog House (TV series), a 2019 UK observational documentary television series
- Dog House (TV series), a Canadian comedy television series broadcast in the 1990–91 season
- The Dog House (film), a 1952 Tom and Jerry short
- The Dog House (talk show), a program that has been on the air in San Francisco, New York & Las Vegas
- Oil well dog house, a general-purpose shelter adjacent to the rig floor, during drilling activities
- Dog House radar, the NATO name for the Russian Dunay-3M radar

== See also ==
- Doghouse (disambiguation)
- In the Doghouse (disambiguation)
