= Jay A. Parry =

American writer

Jay Atwell Parry
- Parry vacationing in France, August 2010.
- Born: October 12, 1950 (age 76); Nampa, Idaho, United States
- Occupations: Author, editor
- Writing career
- Pen name: Joanna Benton, Alden Perkes, Marshall Stringer
- Genres: LDS fiction, non-fiction, science fiction, poetry, self-help

Jay Atwell Parry (born October 12, 1950) is an American author. He writes in several genres, but is primarily known for his LDS nonfiction and his books about George Washington.

== Early life ==
Parry was born in Nampa, Idaho to Atwell Parry, an Idaho state senator, and Elaine Hughes Parry. He is the third child of seven. At the age of 13, he moved with his family to Melba, Idaho, where he worked in his father's grocery store.

After high school, he attended Ricks College (now Brigham Young University–Idaho) in Rexburg, Idaho, where he served as editor of the school's literary magazine, Runes. When he turned 19, he served as a missionary for the Church of Jesus Christ of Latter-day Saints in Houston, Austin, and San Antonio, Texas from 1970 to 1972. Upon returning from his mission, he moved to Provo, Utah to attend Brigham Young University, from which he graduated in August 1974 with a bachelor's degree in English. He served in the United States Air National Guard from 1972 to 1979, and wrote and edited the official newsletter for the Utah Air National Guard.

== Career ==
While in college, Parry worked for the BYU Press as a proofreader and copy editor. This led to him obtaining employment as associate editor for the Church's Ensign magazine from the mid-1970s to the early 1980s.

In the early 80's, Parry stopped working for the Church for a time, and joined a company called Information Design as a partner and writer. Information Design started an initiative called the Parenting Resource Group, which partnered with various doctors and social workers to publish self-help books about improving one's well-being and family. Its mission statement, printed in several of their publications, read: "The Parenting Resource Group is composed of parents, educators, and child development professionals who work together to compile easy-to-read helps for parents."

In 1982, Parry, in collaboration with Information Design, published The Santa Claus Book under the pseudonym Alden Perkes, a humorous Christmas book explaining the origins and mechanics of many Christmas folktales. He was invited as a guest on Good Morning America, where he was interviewed about the book by co-host Joan Lunden.

In 1985, Parry began working for the National Center for Constitutional Studies (NCCS), a non-profit constitutionalist organization founded by faith-based political theorist W. Cleon Skousen. Parry performed writing and editing duties for the center's publications. It was during this time that he co-authored The Real George Washington, a biography of President George Washington published in 1991, written with Skousen and Andrew M. Allison, which coincides with the NCCS's view that the founding of the United States was a divine miracle. Political commentator Glenn Beck has recommended this book numerous times, causing it to have a resurgence in popularity starting in 2008.

Parry left NCCS in 1993 and started working for Latter-day Saint publisher Deseret Book in 1994 as an associate editor. This position fostered a relationship between Parry and the publisher through which he began to publish more of his own works. In April 1998, Parry, along with his brother, Donald W. Parry, published the first installment in their Understanding series, a collection of texts explaining the more difficult concepts of Christian and LDS doctrine through critical analysis and scriptural references. It was also during his time at Deseret Book that Parry compiled and edited the Best-Loved and Everyday books, two series that gathered inspirational stories and poems on different topics, each book revolving around a specific theme.

Due to budget and staffing concerns, Parry was released from his position at Deseret Book in November 2008. After working as a freelance editor for over a year, he once again returned to employment for the Church in 2010, working as a writer and editor for the Church History Department. One of his major assignments was to serve as lead editor in producing Mountain Meadows Massacre: Collected Legal Papers, which was published by University of Oklahoma Press (2017). In 2017 he joined the editorial staff of the Joseph Smith Papers.

Throughout his professional career, Parry has continued to contribute freelance writing and research to various publications, including the Ensign and New Era magazines. He has frequently collaborated with others in his writing. Some of his coauthors have included Kurt Hanks and Larry Belliston (Wake Up Your Creative Genius, Keeping Close, Discipline, Joseph Smith: The Boy...The Prophet, and The Santa Claus Book), Andrew M. Allison (The Real George Washington), Larry E. Morris (The Mormon Book of Lists), Jack M. Lyon, Linda R. Gundry, and Devan Jensen (the Best-Loved series), and Donald W. Parry (Symbols and Shadows and the Understanding series). His most recent books are "Back to First Principles": A Conversation with George Washington (2013) and A Year with America's Founders: 365 Days of Wisdom and Insight from Our Founding Fathers (2015).

Parry is a member of several professional associations, including the American Copy Editors Society, the Association for Documentary Editing, and the Mormon History Association.

== Teaching ==
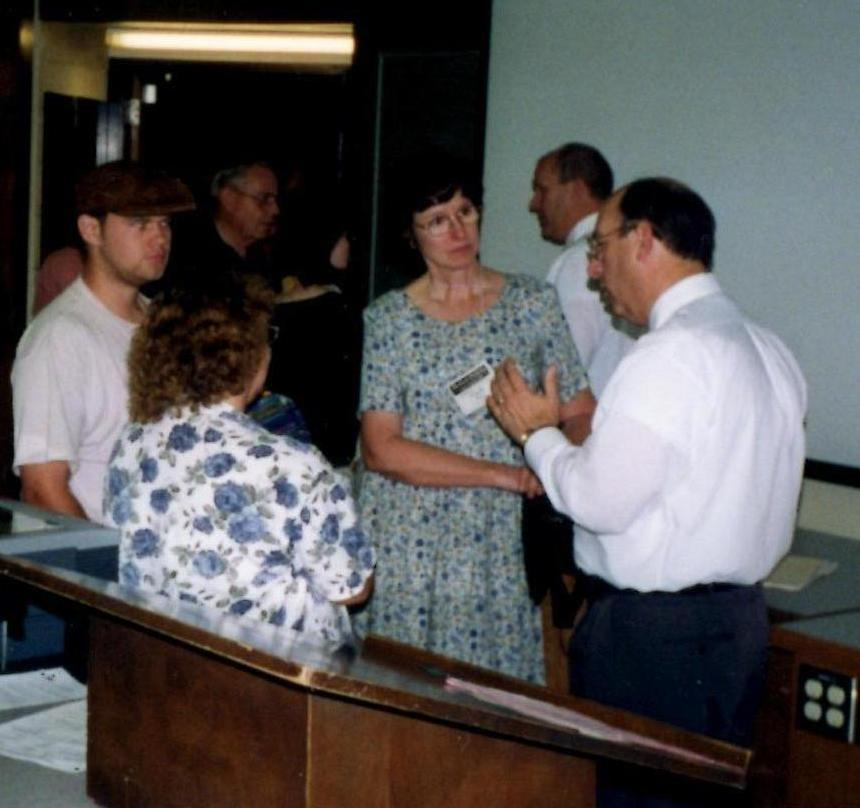
Parry (far right) and brother Donald (background) speak with students at Education Week, 1999.

Parry has been an active participant in the Brigham Young University's Education Week every year since 1999. Education Week is an annual event of adult continuing education where hundreds of classes and workshops are held on the BYU campus. Parry teaches up to three series of classes a year (each series consisting of four different classes), focusing on topics that involve better understanding of the LDS Church's teachings. He has also taught several classes in conjunction with his brother, Donald W. Parry, referencing the books they have authored together. Two of his presentations were taped and are shown periodically on BYU-TV.

Topics have included:

- Death and the Resurrection: Gifts from a Loving Father
- The Book of Revelation: A Vision for Our Day
- Isaiah's Glorious Message for Our Day
- The Legacy of Eve: Women of Faith from Many Generations
- The Mortal Messiah: Love, Power, and Sacrifice
- Receiving the Marvelous Grace of God: Precious Gifts for Daily Living
- Symbols and Shadows: Unlocking a Deeper Understanding of the Atonement
- "A Chosen Land of the Lord": The Miracle of America

== Personal life ==
Parry and his wife, Vicki, have seven children and 14 grandchildren. They currently reside in Salt Lake City, Utah.

Parry is good friends with author Orson Scott Card. They met while working together for BYU Press in the early 1970s and later worked together at the Ensign magazine. They have collaborated on several projects, including the short story "In the Doghouse", originally published in Analog Science Fiction and Fact and later compiled into a collection of Card's short stories, Maps in a Mirror. Another collection of Card's short stories, Capitol, is dedicated to Parry, and reads: "To Jay A. Parry, who has read everything and made it better."

Parry is an active member of the Church of Jesus Christ of Latter-day Saints.

== Works ==
Following is a selected list of Jay A. Parry's works:

=== Fiction ===
- The Burning (1991) ISBN 0875795218
- The Santa Claus Book (published under the pseudonym Alden Perkes, 1982) ISBN 978-0818403811

=== Short fiction ===
- "Christmas Offerings" (published in Once Upon a Christmastime: Short Stories for the Season, Deseret Book, 1997)
- "Moulder Moulder" (published in Chrysalis 10, Doubleday, 1983)
- "'Magdalena Katalena Hoopensteiner Walleniner Hokum Mokum Pokum Was Her Name'" (published in New Era, the Church of Jesus Christ of Latter-day Saints, 1980)
- "Brother Angelo" (published in Ensign, the Church of Jesus Christ of Latter-day Saints, 1980)
- "Gods in the Fire, Gods in the Rain" (published in Chrysalis 5, Zebra, 1979)
- "In the Doghouse" (published in Analog Science Fiction and Fact, 1978)
- "Roboroots" (published in Isaac Asimov's Science Fiction Magazine, 1978)
- "The Year We Discovered Tradition" (published in Ensign, the Church of Jesus Christ of Latter-day Saints, 1977)

=== Nonfiction ===
==== Understanding series ====
- Understanding the Parables of Jesus Christ (2006) ISBN 978-1590386262
- Understanding Death and the Resurrection (2003) ISBN 1570088268
- Understanding the Signs of the Times (1999) ISBN 978-1573455886; ISBN 978-1590389997
- Understanding the Book of Revelation (1998) ISBN 1573454389
- Understanding Isaiah (1998) ISBN 978-1573453615; ISBN 9781606410813

==== Other nonfiction works ====
- "Back to First Principles": A Conversation with George Washington (2013)
- The Story of Christ: A Scriptural Retelling (2011) ISBN 978-1609088576
- Symbols and Shadows: Unlocking a Deeper Understanding of the Atonement (2009) ISBN 978-1606411292
- The 12 Purposes of Life: A Down-to-Earth Guide for the Mortal Traveler (2005) ISBN 159038444X
- The Real George Washington: The True Story of America's Most Indispensable Man (1991) ISBN 0880800135; ISBN 0880800143
- Soldiers, Statesmen & Heroes: America's Founding Presidents (1990) ISBN 0880800275; ISBN 0880800224
- The One-Minute Secret (1989) ISBN 0884946878
- Traveling With Kids: 101 Tips for a Great Trip (1989) ISBN 978-0944803691
- The Mormon Book of Lists (1987) ISBN 0884946223
- Eternal Pursuit: The Mormon Trivia Book (1985) ISBN 0884945782
- Keeping Close: How to Make Your Relationships Work (published under the pseudonym Joanna Benton, 1983) ISBN 978-0806508399
- 101 Ways to Boost Your Child's Self-esteem (1982) ISBN 978-0940212091
- Wake Up Your Creative Genius (1983) ISBN 0865760519

=== Children's books ===
- Joseph Smith: The Boy...The Prophet (1981) ISBN 0884944263
- Lehi & the Liahona (1979) ISBN 0933790023
- Joseph Smith & the Priesthood (1979)
- Wilford Woodruff at Benbow Farm (1979)

=== Poetry ===
- You, Simeon, Spirit-filled (published in Christmas Classics: A Treasury for Latter-day Saints, Deseret Book, 1995, ISBN 978-1573450898)
- Christchild (published in The Magic of Christmas: A Collection of Stories, Poems, Essays and Traditions by Favorite LDS Authors, Deseret Book, 1992, ISBN 978-0875796529)
- Nauvoo Remembers (published in Ensign, the Church of Jesus Christ of Latter-day Saints, 1979)
- Nursery Corner (published in Ensign, the Church of Jesus Christ of Latter-day Saints, 1978)
- The Silent Places (published in Ensign, the Church of Jesus Christ of Latter-day Saints, 1975)

=== Compilations ===
==== Best-Loved series ====
- Best-Loved Talks of the LDS People (2002) ISBN 1570088241
- Best-Loved Christmas Stories of the LDS People (2001) ISBN 1570087229
- Best-Loved Stories of the LDS People, Volume 3 (2000) ISBN 978-1573458023
- Best-Loved Humor of the LDS People (1999) ISBN 978-1590389713
- Best-Loved Stories of the LDS People, Volume 2 (1999) ISBN 978-1573455749
- Best-Loved Stories of the LDS People, Volume 1 (1997) ISBN 1573452661; ISBN 1573455741
- Best-Loved Poems of the LDS People (1996) ISBN 978-1573452120

==== Everyday series ====
- Everyday Answers: True Stories About God's Presence in Our Lives (2003) ISBN 1570089825
- Everyday Heroes: True Stories of Ordinary People Who Made a Difference (2002) ISBN 1570088551
- Everyday Miracles: True Stories About God's Hand in Our Lives (2001) ISBN 1570087776

==== Other compilations ====
- A Year with America's Founders: 365 Days of Wisdom and Insight from Our Founding Fathers (2015) ISBN 978-1627301169
- Prophetic Verse: Including 'The Gods of the Copybook Headings,' by Rudyard Kipling (2015) ISBN 978-1627301107
- The Gift of Eternal Life (2003) ISBN 978-1570089084
- The Gift of the Atonement (2002) ISBN 1570087806
- I'll Be Home for Christmas: True Stories for the Season (1998) ISBN 978-1573454377
- Poems that Lift the Soul (1998) ISBN 978-1573453646
- Once Upon a Christmastime: Short Stories for the Season (1997) ISBN 1573452874
- LDS Women's Treasury (1997) ISBN 1573451665
- Keeping Christmas: Stories from the Heart (1996) ISBN 978-1573451987
- Christmas Classics: A Treasury for Latter-day Saints (1995) ISBN 1573450898
