= Pore pressure gradient =

Concept in petrophysics

Pore pressure gradient is a dimensional petrophysical term used by drilling engineers and mud engineers during the design of drilling programs for drilling (constructing) oil and gas wells into the earth. It is the pressure gradient inside the pore space of the rock column from the surface of the ground down to the total depth (TD), as compared to the pressure gradient of seawater in deep water.

In drilling engineering, the pore pressure gradient is usually expressed in API-type International Association of Drilling Contractors (IADC) physical units of measurement, namely "psi per foot", whereas in "pure math," the gradient of a scalar function expressed by the math notation grad(f) may not have physical units associated with it.

In the well-known formula

P = 0.052 * mud weight * true vertical depth

taught in almost all petroleum engineering courses worldwide, the mud weight (MW) is expressed in pounds per U.S. gallon, and the true vertical depth (TVD) is expressed in feet, and 0.052 is a commonly used conversion constant that can be derived by dimensional analysis:

$\mathrm{ \frac{1\; psi}{ft} \times \frac{1\; ft}{12\; in}\times \frac{1\; lb/in^{2}}{1\; psi}\times \frac{231\; in^{3}}{1\; US\; Gal}=19.25000000\; lb/gal}$

It would be more accurate to divide a value in lb/gal by 19.25 than to multiply that value by 0.052. The magnitude of the error caused by multiplying by 0.052 is approximately 0.1%.

Example: For a column of fresh water of 8.33 pounds per gallon (lb/U.S. gal) standing still hydrostatically in a 21,000 feet vertical cased wellbore from top to bottom (vertical hole), the pressure gradient would be

grad(P) = pressure gradient = 8.33 / 19.25 = 0.43273 psi/ft

and the hydrostatic bottom hole pressure (BHP) is then

BHP = TVD * grad(P) = 21,000 * 0.43273 = 9,087 psi

However, the formation fluid pressure (pore pressure) is usually much greater than a column of fresh water, and can be as much as 19 lb/U.S. gal (e.g., in Iran). For an onshore vertical wellbore with an exposed open hole interval at 21,000 feet with a pore pressure gradient of 19 lb/U.S. gal, the BHP would be

BHP = pore pres grad * TVD = 21,000 * 19 / 19.25 = 20,727 psi

The calculation of a bottom hole pressure and the pressure induced by a static column of fluid are the most important and basic calculations in all well control courses taught worldwide for the prevention of oil and gas well blowouts.

== Simple examples ==
Using the figures above, we can calculate the maximum pressure at various depths in an offshore oil well.

 Saltwater is 0.444 psi/ft (2.5% higher than fresh water but this not general and depends on salt concentration in water)
 Pore pressure in the rock could be as high as 1.0 psi/ft of depth (19.25 lb/gal)

A well with 5,000 feet of seawater and 15,000 feet of rock could have an overburden pressures at the bottom as high as 17,220 psi (5000 * 0.444 + 15000 * 1.0). That pressure is reduced at the surface by the weight of oil and gas the riser pipe, but this is only a small percentage of the total. It takes heavy mud (drilling fluid) inserted at the bottom to control the well when pressures are this high.
