= Major Drilling Group International =

Mining services company

Coordinates: 46°05′34″N 64°46′37″W

Major Drilling Group International Inc.
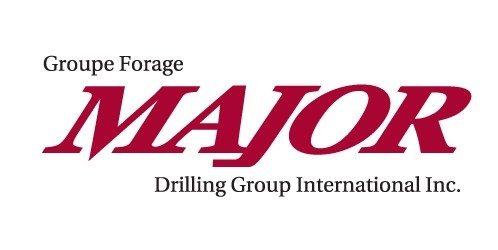
- Company type: Public
- Traded as: TSX: MDI
- Industry: Drilling
- Founded: Moncton, New Brunswick (1980)
- Headquarters: Moncton, New Brunswick, Canada
- Key people: Denis Larocque
- Number of employees: 5,400
- Website: www.majordrilling.com

Major Drilling Group International Inc. is the world's largest mineral drilling company serving the mining industry.

To support its customers’ varied exploration drilling requirements, Major Drilling maintains field operations and offices in Canada, the United States, Mexico, South America, Asia, Africa and Europe. Major Drilling provides all types of drilling services including surface and underground coring, directional, reverse circulation, sonic, geotechnical, environmental, water-well, coal-bed methane, shallow gas, underground percussive/longhole drilling, as well as surface drill and blast.
