= 1980s oil glut =

Significant surplus of crude oil

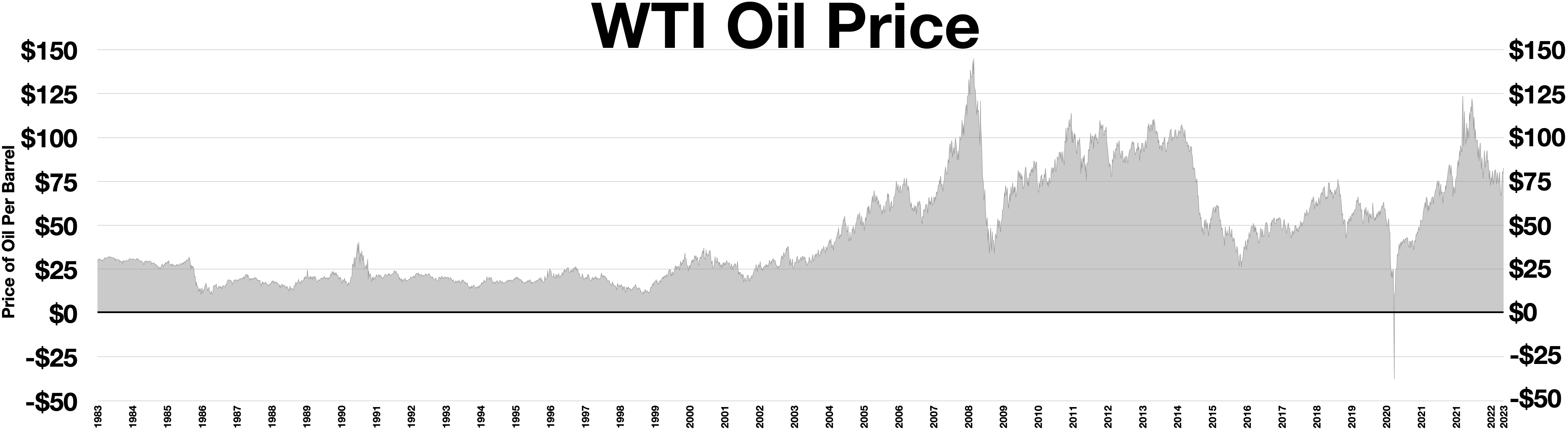
WTI oil prices 1983–2023

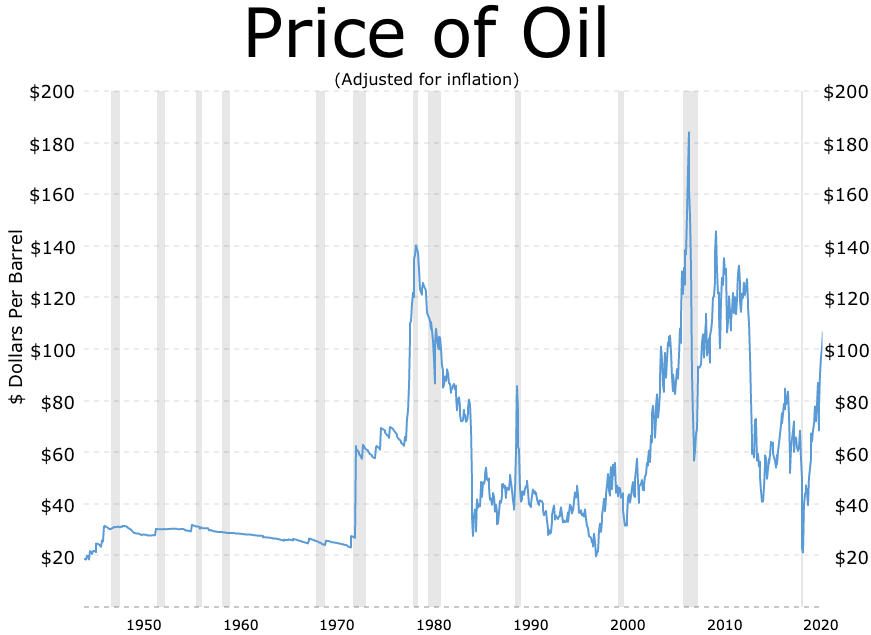
Price of oil adjusted for inflation

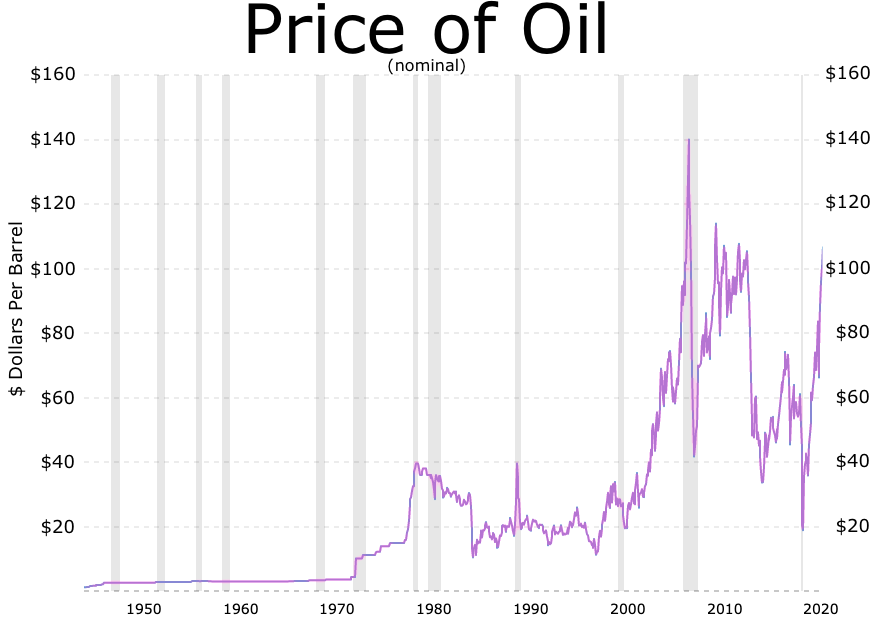
Price of oil (nominal)

West Texas Intermediate oil price history 1946–2022

The 1980s oil glut was a significant surplus of crude oil caused by falling demand following the 1970s energy crisis. The world price of oil had peaked in 1980 at over US$35 per barrel (equivalent to $137 per barrel in 2025 dollars, when adjusted for inflation); it fell in 1986 from $27 to below $10 ($79 to $29 in 2025 dollars). The glut began in the early 1980s as a result of slowed economic activity in industrial countries due to the crises of the 1970s, especially in 1973 and 1979, and the energy conservation (including replacing oil in some applications with other fuels) spurred by high fuel prices. The inflation-adjusted real 2004 dollar value of oil fell from an average of $78.2 in 1981 to an average of $26.8 per barrel in 1986.

In June 1981, The New York Times proclaimed that an "oil glut" had arrived and Time stated that "the world temporarily floats in a glut of oil". However, The New York Times warned the next week that the word "glut" was misleading, and that temporary surpluses had brought down prices somewhat, but prices were still well above pre-energy crisis levels. This sentiment was echoed in November 1981, when the CEO of Exxon also characterized the glut as a temporary surplus, and that the word "glut" was an example of "our American penchant for exaggerated language". He wrote that the main cause of the glut was declining consumption. In the United States, Europe, and Japan, oil consumption had fallen 13% from 1979 to 1981, "in part, in reaction to the very large increases in oil prices by the Organization of Petroleum Exporting Countries and other oil exporters", continuing a trend begun during the 1973 price increases.

After 1980, reduced demand and increased production produced a glut on the world market. The result was a six-year decline in the price of oil, which reduced the price by half in 1986 alone.

== Production ==
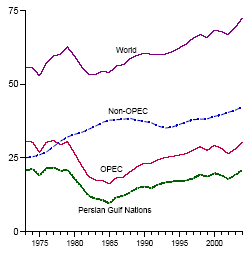
OPEC, non-OPEC and world oil production, 1973–2004

=== Non-OPEC ===
During the 1980s, reliance on Middle East production dwindled as commercial exploration developed major non-OPEC oilfields in Siberia, Alaska, the North Sea, and the Gulf of Mexico, and the Soviet Union became the world's largest producer of oil. Smaller non-OPEC producers including Brazil, Egypt, India, Malaysia, and Oman doubled their output between 1979 and 1985, to a total of 3 million barrels per day.

==== United States ====
In April 1979, U.S. President Jimmy Carter signed an executive order to remove price controls from petroleum products by October 1981 so that prices would be wholly determined by the free market. Carter's successor, Ronald Reagan, signed an executive order on 28 January 1981, which enacted that reform immediately, allowing the free market to adjust oil prices in the United States. That ended the withdrawal of old oil from the market and artificial scarcity, which encouraged an increase in oil production.

Additionally, the Trans-Alaska Pipeline System began pumping oil in 1977. The Alaskan Prudhoe Bay Oil Field entered peak production, supplying 2 million bpd of crude oil in 1988, 25 percent of all U.S. oil production.

==== North Sea ====
Phillips Petroleum discovered oil in the Chalk Group at Ekofisk, in Norwegian waters in the central North Sea. Discoveries increased exponentially in the 1970s and 1980s, and new fields were developed throughout the continental shelf.

=== OPEC ===
From 1980 to 1986, OPEC decreased oil production several times in an attempt to maintain oil's high prices. However, it failed to hold on to its preeminent position, and by 1981, its production was surpassed by non-OPEC countries. OPEC had seen its share of the world market drop to less than a third in 1985, from about half during the 1970s. In February 1982, the Boston Globe reported that OPEC's production, which had previously peaked in 1977, was at its lowest level since 1969. Non-OPEC nations were at that time supplying most of the West's imports.

OPEC's membership began to have divided opinions over what actions to take. In September 1985, Saudi Arabia became unhappy with de facto propping up prices by lowering its own production in the face of high output from elsewhere in OPEC. In 1985, daily output was around 3.5 million bpd, down from around 10 million in 1981. During this period, OPEC members were supposed to meet production quotas in order to maintain price stability; however, many countries inflated their reserves to achieve higher quotas, cheated, or outright refused to accord with the quotas. In 1985, the Saudis tired of this behavior and decided to punish the undisciplined OPEC countries. The Saudis abandoned their role as swing producer and began producing at full capacity, creating a "huge surplus that angered many of their colleagues in OPEC". High-cost oil production facilities became less or even not profitable. Oil prices as a result fell to as low as $7 per barrel.

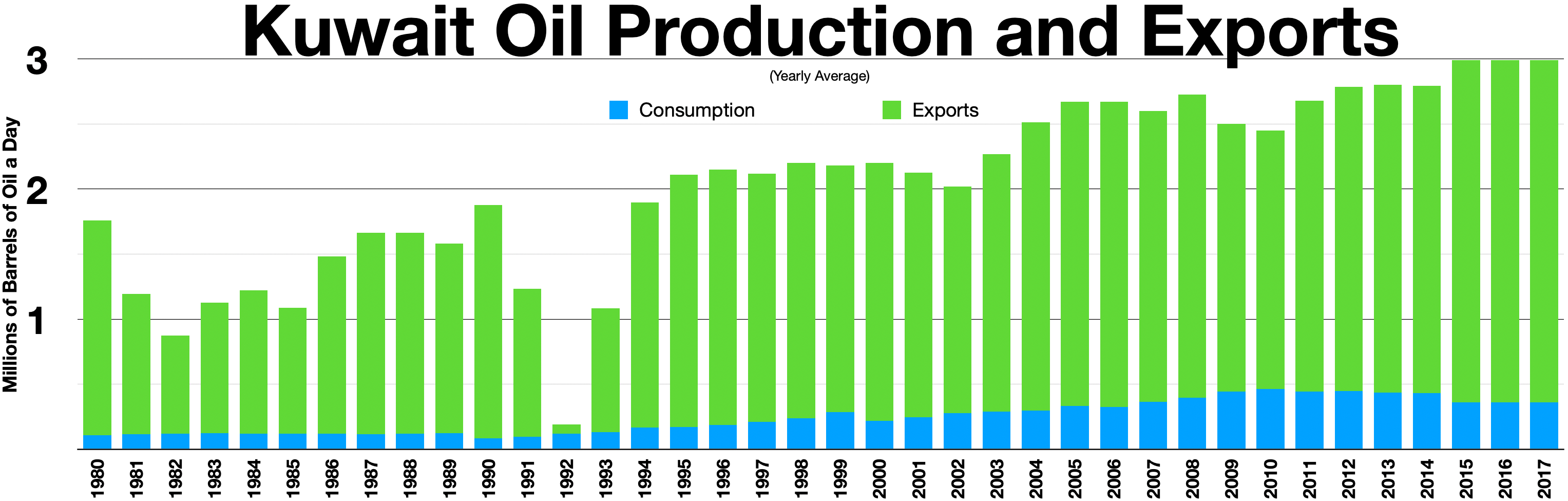
Kuwait oil production and exports

== Reduced demand ==
World energy consumption, 1965–2013, showing oil demand falling significantly in the early 1980s

OPEC had relied on the price inelasticity of demand of oil to maintain high consumption, but underestimated the extent to which other sources of supply would become profitable as prices increased. Electricity generation from coal, nuclear power and natural gas; home heating from natural gas; and ethanol blended gasoline all reduced the demand for oil.

=== United States ===
New passenger car fuel economy in the United States changed from 14 miles per US gallon (17 L/100 km) in 1975 to 22 miles per US gallon (11 L/100 km) in 1982, a change of more than 50 percent.

The United States imported 28 percent of its oil in 1982 and 1983, down from 46.5 percent in 1977, due to lower consumption.

=== France ===
History of French energy consumption by source. The decline in oil consumption past 1973 is prominently visible.

France had relied to a significant extent on imported petroleum for electricity production prior to the 1973 oil price shock. The "Messmer Plan" implemented under prime minister Pierre Messmer called for a massive expansion of nuclear power using license built pressurized water reactors instead of the older French UNGG reactors.

== Impact ==
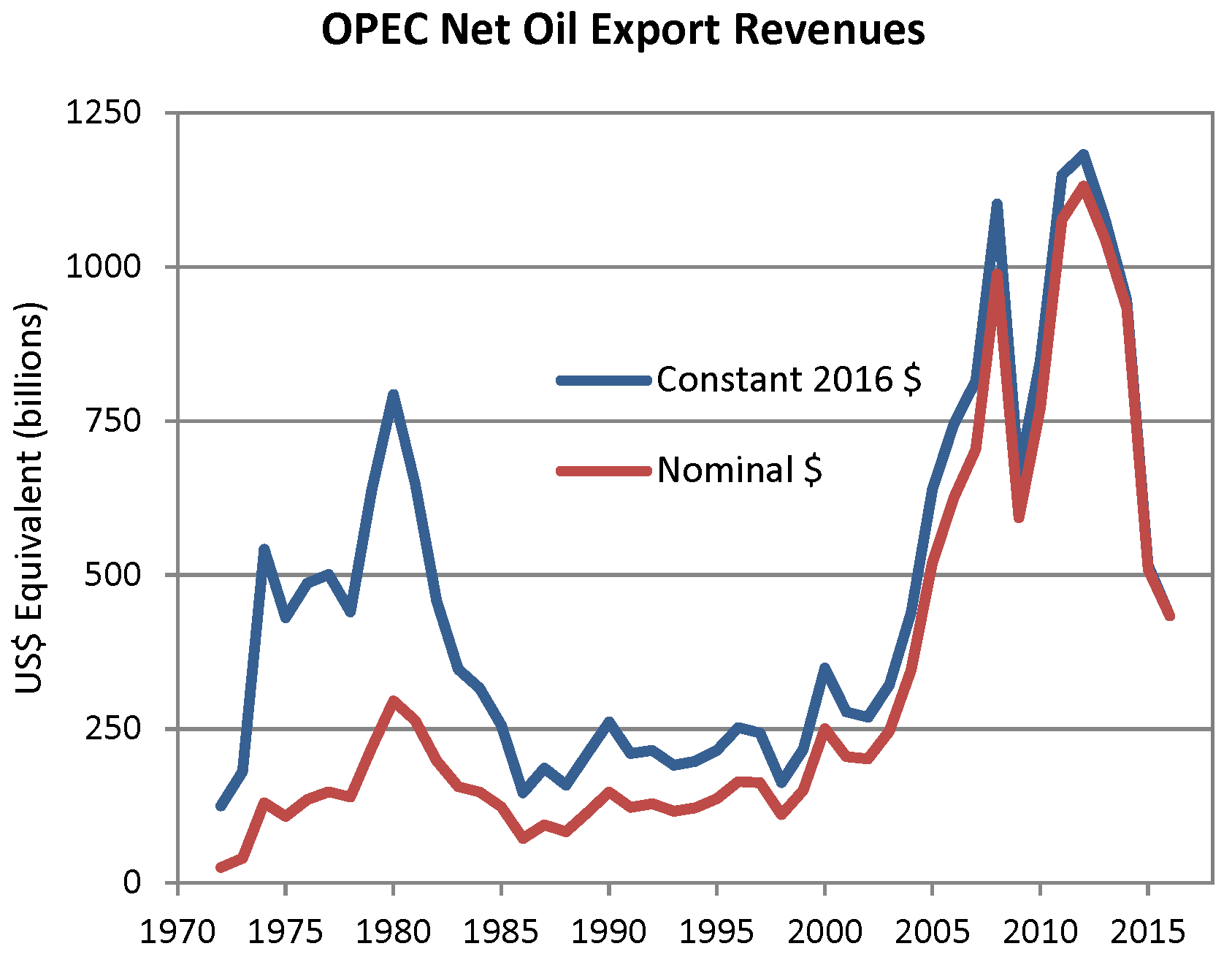
Fluctuations of OPEC net oil export revenues since 1972

The 1986 oil price collapse benefited oil-consuming countries such as the United States and Japan, countries in Europe, and developing nations but represented a serious loss in revenue for oil-producing countries in Northern Europe, the Soviet Union, and OPEC.

In 1981, before the brunt of the glut, Time Magazine wrote that in general, "A glut of crude causes tighter development budgets" in some oil-exporting nations. Mexico had an economic and debt crisis in 1982. The Venezuelan economy contracted and inflation levels (consumer price inflation) rose, remaining between 6 and 12% from 1982 to 1986. The crisis resulted in the 1989 Caracazo protests. Even Saudi Arabian economic power was significantly weakened.

Iraq had fought a long and costly war against Iran and had particularly weak revenues. It was upset by Kuwait contributing to the glut and allegedly pumping oil from the Rumaila field below their common border. Iraq invaded Kuwait in 1990, planning to increase reserves and revenues and cancel the debt, resulting in the first Gulf War.

The glut directed Algeria into an economic recession and directly influenced the politics: the authoritarian regime of Chadli Bendjedid had to compromise with Islamic opposition in 1984 and start economic reforms dismantling socialism in 1987. After the 1988 October Riots he reformed the constitution twice, liberalized the political space amid growing discontent, and was ousted from office by the military after his party lost the first multi-party elections to Islamists, eventually leading to the Algerian Civil War.

The Soviet Union had become a major oil producer before the glut. The drop of oil prices contributed to the nation's final collapse.

In the United States, domestic exploration and the number of active drilling rigs were cut dramatically. In late 1985, there were nearly 2,300 rigs drilling wells; a year later, there were barely 1,000. The number of U.S. petroleum producers decreased from 11,370 in 1985 to 5,231 in 1989, according to data from the Independent Petroleum Association of America. Oil producers held back on the search for new oilfields for fear of losing on their investments. In May 2007, companies like ExxonMobil were not making nearly the investment in finding new oil that they did in 1981.

Canada responded to high energy prices in the 1970s with the National Energy Program (NEP) in 1980. The program was in place until 1985.

== See also ==
- 1980–1989 world oil market chronology
- 1981 in the environment
- 2010s oil glut
- 2020 Russia–Saudi Arabia oil price war
- United States energy law
