= Tri-County Conference =

Tri-County Conference is the name of multiple high school athletic conferences in the United States.

Current

- Tri-County Conference (Illinois), an affiliation of ten high schools
- Tri-County Conference (Michigan), an affiliation of eight high schools
- Tri-County Conference (New Jersey), an affiliation of 21 high schools

Historical

- Tri-County Conference (Central Indiana), Monroe, Morgan, and Owen Counties, 1935–1971
- Tri-County Conference (Northern Indiana), Howard, Miami, and Grant Counties, 1950–1965; became the Mid-Indiana Conference
- Tri-County Conference (Southern Indiana), Jennings, Ripley, and Jefferson Counties, 1920s–1966
- Tri-County Conference (Western Indiana), Sullivan, Greene, and Clay Counties, <1932–1967
