= In the Doghouse (short story) =

- Short story by Orson Scott Card Jay A. Parry
- Country: United States
- Language: English

Publication
- Published in: Analog
- Publication type: Periodical
- Publisher: Dell Magazines
- Media type: Print (Magazine)
- Publication date: 1978

"In the Doghouse" is a science fiction short story by American writers Orson Scott Card and Jay A. Parry. It appears in his short story collection Maps in a Mirror. Card originally published this story in the December 1978 issue of Analog Science Fiction and Fact.

== Plot summary ==
An entire species of aliens fleeing from a doomed planet sends an agent ahead to the planet Earth to prepare the way for the arrival of their minds, the only part of themselves they have been able to preserve. Since killing another sentient species is against their moral code, their agent decides that the most common and widely beloved non-sentient species on the planet, dogs, are to serve as the new vessels for his fellow aliens' minds. This he arranges for them by designing and selling a small solar power plant—disguised as a doghouse—that produces enough energy to serve the needs of an entire household with plenty to spare. This product is wildly successful, and soon there are more than enough doghouses with dogs in them to accommodate his people.

When he brings his people into their new home, however, neither he nor his people have the foresight to realize that humanity is too blinded by its egotism ever to see its dogs as anything but pets. As such, he has doomed them all to the horrible fate of never being allowed to be anything but servants to the dogs' owners, since the humans are not aware of the aliens' intellectual superiority.

== See also ==
- List of works by Orson Scott Card
- Orson Scott Card
- Jay A. Parry
