= In the Doghouse =

In the Doghouse or In the Dog House may refer to:

- In the Doghouse (film), a 1962 British comedy
- "In the Doghouse" (short story), by Orson Scott Card
- In the Dog House, American title of the Canadian reality TV show At the End of My Leash

== See also ==
- In a Doghouse, a 1998 Throwing Muses compilation album
