= 1980–1989 world oil market chronology =

1980s economic history

== 1980 ==
- March 1: United States federal Windfall Profits Tax enacted.
- May: Saudi Light raised to $28.00 per barrel, retroactive to April 1.
- April–September: : Buy-Sell Program allocations drop to average of 120,000 bbl/d (19,000 m^{3}/d) for period April to September 1980.:
- September 17: Iraq breaks 1975 treaty with Iran and proclaims sovereignty over Shatt al-Arab waterway.
- September 23: Iraq invades Iran. Mutual bombing of installations.
- November 10: Iraq captures southern port of Khorramshahr.
- November 20–24: U.N. gulf war mediator Olof Palme makes first unsuccessful peace shuttle between Tehran and Baghdad.
- December: Collapse of OPEC's pricing structure. Saudis use $32 per barrel marker, others use $36 per barrel benchmark.

== 1981 ==
Saudis flood market with inexpensive oil in 1981, forcing unprecedented price cuts by OPEC members. In October, all 13 OPEC members align on a compromise $32 per barrel benchmark. Later, benchmark price is maintained, but differentials are adjusted.

- January: Iraq repels first major Iranian offensive.
- January 28: President Reagan lifts remaining domestic petroleum price and allocation controls originally scheduled to expire in September 1981.
- April: After meetings in Baghdad and Teheran, attempts by nine Islamic Conference leaders to mediate peace between Iraq and Iran fail.
- Aug: Windfall profits tax reduced.
- September 27–28: Iran defends its besieged port of Abadan, driving back Iraqi forces.
- Oct: OPEC reaches an agreement to unify crude price at $32 per barrel through 1982 and sets an ultimate price ceiling of $38 per barrel.
- November 29: Major Iranian offensive mounted on central front.

== 1982 ==
Indications of a world oil glut lead to a rapid decline in world oil prices early in 1982. OPEC appears to lose control over world oil prices.

- March: Damascus closes Iraq's 400,000 bbl/d (64,000 m^{3}/d) trans-Syrian oil export pipeline to show support for Iran.
- March 11: U.S. boycotts Libyan crude.
- May 24:Iran recaptures Khorramshahr.
- June: Iran demands $150 billion in war reparations; pledges war until Iraq's Hussein stands trial.
- June 10: Iraq declares unilateral cease-fire.
- Jul 13: Iran launches first attack into Iraq.

== 1983 ==
Oil glut takes hold. Demand falls as a result of conservation, use of other fuels and recession. OPEC agrees to limit overall output to 17.5 Mbbl/d (2,780,000 m^{3}/d). OPEC agrees to individual output quotas and cuts prices by $5 to $29 per barrel.

- March: Chicago Board of Trade (CBOT) and New York Mercantile Exchange (Nymex) enable the trading of crude oil futures contracts.
- April/May: CBOT contracts have delivery problems. Customers move to Nymex
- April: Iraq increases missile attacks on Iran.
- Jul 20-30: Iran moves into northern Iraq. Casualties top 13,800 in ten days.
- Jul 26: U.S. threatens action to preserve navigation in Persian Gulf.
- Jul-Aug: Heavy fighting and casualties in Iran-Iraq war.
- Oct: Iran attacks northern Iraq, threatening Kirkuk pipeline.

== 1984 ==
- February - March: Iran captures Majnoon Islands.
- March 27: Beginning of "tanker war." Over the next nine months, 44 ships, including Iranian, Iraqi, Saudi Arabian and Kuwaiti tankers, are attacked by Iraqi or Iranian warplanes or damaged by mines.
- March - June: Iran mobilizes 500,000 troops to southern front. No offensive materializes.
- May 26: President Reagan rules out U.S. military intervention.
- June: Civilian target truce in Iran-Iraq war.
- Oct: Norway and Britain cut prices in response to falling spot market. Nigeria follows, renewing pressure on OPEC price cuts.
- October 17: OPEC cuts production to 16 Mbbl/d (2,500,000 m^{3}/d), but agreement is negated by cheating and price-discounting.

== 1985 ==
- January: Nine OPEC members adjust prices to cut gap between light and heavy crudes from $4 to $2.40 per barrel. Saudi light price cut one dollar to $28 per barrel.
- March 11–19: Iranian offensive; heavy casualties.
- May–June: "Battle of the cities" - heavy bombing from both Iran and Iraq.
- June: OPEC output falls to 20-year low of 13.7 Mbbl/d (2,180,000 m^{3}/d).
- June: Iran begins hit-and-run raids on Iraq.
- July: OPEC loses customers to cheaper North Sea oil. More OPEC price cuts.
- Aug: Saudi Arabia links prices to spot market. Output rises from 2 Mbbl/d (320,000 m^{3}/d) in August to 5 Mbbl/d (790,000 m^{3}/d) in early 1986.
- Aug 15: First Iraqi air raid on Iran's main oil export terminal, Kharg Island.
- November 6: Exploratory well in Ranger, Texas, blows out, spilling 150,000 bbl (24,000 m^{3}) of crude oil.
- December: OPEC output hits 18 Mbbl/d (2,900,000 m^{3}/d) boosting a glut and triggering a price war.

== 1986 ==
Average world oil prices fall by over 50 percent in 1986. There is wide use of netback pricing in 1986.

- February 3–4: OPEC fails to agree upon a production accord after a two-day meeting in Vienna.
- February: Iran captures southern Faw peninsula, starts northern offensive.
- May 7: Iraq bombs Tehran refinery.
- June: OPEC production-cut talks fail, ending in a tentative majority pact on an average 1986 ceiling of 17.6 Mbbl/d (2,800,000 m^{3}/d).
- June 8: Iraqi jets attack Assadabad satellite station.
- July: Brent price dips under $9 per barrel. OPEC production rises to 20 Mbbl/d (3,200,000 m^{3}/d).
- Jul 27: Iraqi jets attack central Iranian city of Arak. Iran threatens missile attack of gulf states supporting Iraq.
- Aug 2: Hussein offers peace in open letter to Iran.
- Aug 4: Reports of probable OPEC agreement on output quotas sends oil prices higher.
- Aug 12: Iran fires missile at refinery near Baghdad. Iraq raids Iranian terminal at Sirri Island severely disrupting Iranian exports.
- December 19: OPEC reaches an accord that would cut production by seven percent for the first six months of 1987 (from 17 Mbbl/d (2,700,000 m^{3}/d) to 16 Mbbl/d (2,500,000 m^{3}/d)) and would raise prices immediately toward a target world oil price of $18 per barrel.

== 1987 ==
- January: OPEC price accord begins to deteriorate.
- February: OPEC majors stick to fixed prices.
- Jun-Aug: Gulf war escalates.
- December: OPEC meeting failure.

== 1988 ==
- February: OPEC price meeting set.
- March: OPEC/Non-OPEC meeting failure.
- July: Iran accepts cease fire.
- October 14: Crude oil prices jump in anticipation of possible production accord at Gulf Cooperation Council meeting set for October 16.
- November 28: OPEC reaches production accord. Six-month agreement to set production at 18.5 Mbbl/d (2,940,000 m^{3}/d). Although the recent OPEC quota had been 19.0 Mbbl/d (3,020,000 m^{3}/d), actual OPEC production had been closer to 21.0 Mbbl/d (3,340,000 m^{3}/d).
- December: Fulmar/Brent outages.

== 1989 ==
- March: Exxon tanker Valdez runs aground, spilling 11 million US gallons (42,000 m^{3}) of crude oil in the waters of Prince William Sound's Bligh Reef. Oil prices react upward to news of the spill and to potential shortages on the west coast caused by refinery fires there.
- June: OPEC raises their production ceiling to 19.5 Mbbl/d (3,100,000 m^{3}/d).

== See also ==
- 1980s oil glut
