= Energy slave =

Term in energy economics

Relationship of energy slaves to human employees in a personnel-intensive company

Relationship of energy slaves to human employees in an energy-intensive company

An energy slave is that quantity of energy (ability to do work) which, when used to construct and drive non-human infrastructure (machines, roads, power grids, fuel, draft animals, wind-driven pumps, etc.) replaces a unit of human labor (actual work). An energy slave does the work of a person, through the consumption of energy in the non-human infrastructure.

== History ==
In 1940, Buckminster Fuller was the first to use the term "energy slave" in a map in Fortune. He calculated the yield of an energy slave by taking the energy from minerals and water consumed by industry and dividing it by the energy provided by a human being. For a world population of just over two billion people (2 125 000 000 exactly), Fuller estimates that there are thirty-six billion energy slaves at the time, representing 17 per capita. In 1940, these energy slaves were not equitably distributed around the world: the United States owned twenty billion of them (54% of the world total). In 1950, Fuller revised his calculations upwards and estimated that, on average, each human holds 38 energy slaves.

In 1963, Alfred René Ubbelohde also used this concept in his book Man and Energy. In Germany, the physicist Hans-Peter Dürr used this concept. The term is also mentioned in a 1975 book and has become popular in the scientific literature.

An exhibition in Switzerland in 2001 presents a popularised definition of "energy slaves" based on the work carried out by Tourane Corbière-Nicollier under the supervision of Olivier Jolliet of the EPFL-GECOS laboratory in Lausanne. The definition given is ː "The energy slave is a unit of measurement that allows us to better understand and evaluate the consequences of our life choices. An energy slave works to produce energy 24 hours a day. He produces an average power output of 100 W (876 kWh per year)."

In France, the term energy slave is used by Jean-Marc Jancovici and has been studied by the historian Jean-François Mouhot. Jean-Marc Jancovici draws the following conclusion: "in a democracy: it is not only the way of life of Mr. Dassault or the Queen of England that has become unsustainable if we put ourselves in the realm of physics, but that of each and every one of us, including factory workers, cleaners and supermarket cashiers."

== Calculation method ==
The number of energy slaves per capita depends on the method of calculation: either we take the average energy provided by a slave 24 hours a day, 365 days a year, or, as Fuller does, we use the mechanical energy provided by a healthy individual working 40 hours a week (or 3 kWh per week). In comparison, a litre of gasoline can provide 9kWh to run an engine for example.

== Usage ==
An energy slave is used to compare the productivity of a person and the energy that would be required to produce that work in the modern, oil fuelled industrial economy, although it could be applied anywhere that labor is produced with non-human sourced energy. It does not include the ancillary costs of damage to the environment or social structures. Formally, one energy slave produces one unit of human labor through the non-human tools and energy supplied by the industrial economy, and therefore 1 ES times a constant that converts to work accomplished equal one human labor unit.

== Bibliography ==
- (fr) Jean-François Mouhot, Des esclaves énergétiques – Réflexions sur le changement climatique, Champ Vallon editions, 2011.
- (en) Andrew Nikiforuk, The Energy of Slaves : Oil and the New Servitude, Greystone Books, 17 August 2012, 272 p. (ISBN 978-1-55365-979-2, read online [archive]).
- (en) Bob Johnson, Mineral Rites : An Archaeology of the Fossil Economy, JHU Press, 26 March 2019, 256 p.
