= Thermomechanical cuttings cleaner =

The thermomechanical cuttings cleaner (TCC) is a patented technology mainly used by service providers in the oil and gas industry to separate and recover the components of oil-contaminated drilling waste. A TCC converts kinetic energy to thermal energy in a thermal desorption process which efficiently transforms drilling waste into re-usable products. Using kinetic energy instead of indirect heating allows for very short retention times and as a consequence the quality of the separated components is not affected by the treatment. Thus the recovered water, base oil and solids can be re-used after the treatment process.
