= Oil well dog house =

General use room on oil rigs

An oil well dog house is the steel-sided room adjacent to an oil rig floor, usually having an access door close to the driller's controls. This general-purpose shelter is a combination tool shed, office, communications center, coffee room, lunchroom, and general meeting place for the driller and his crew. It is at the same elevation as the rig floor, usually cantilevered out from the main substructure supporting the rig.

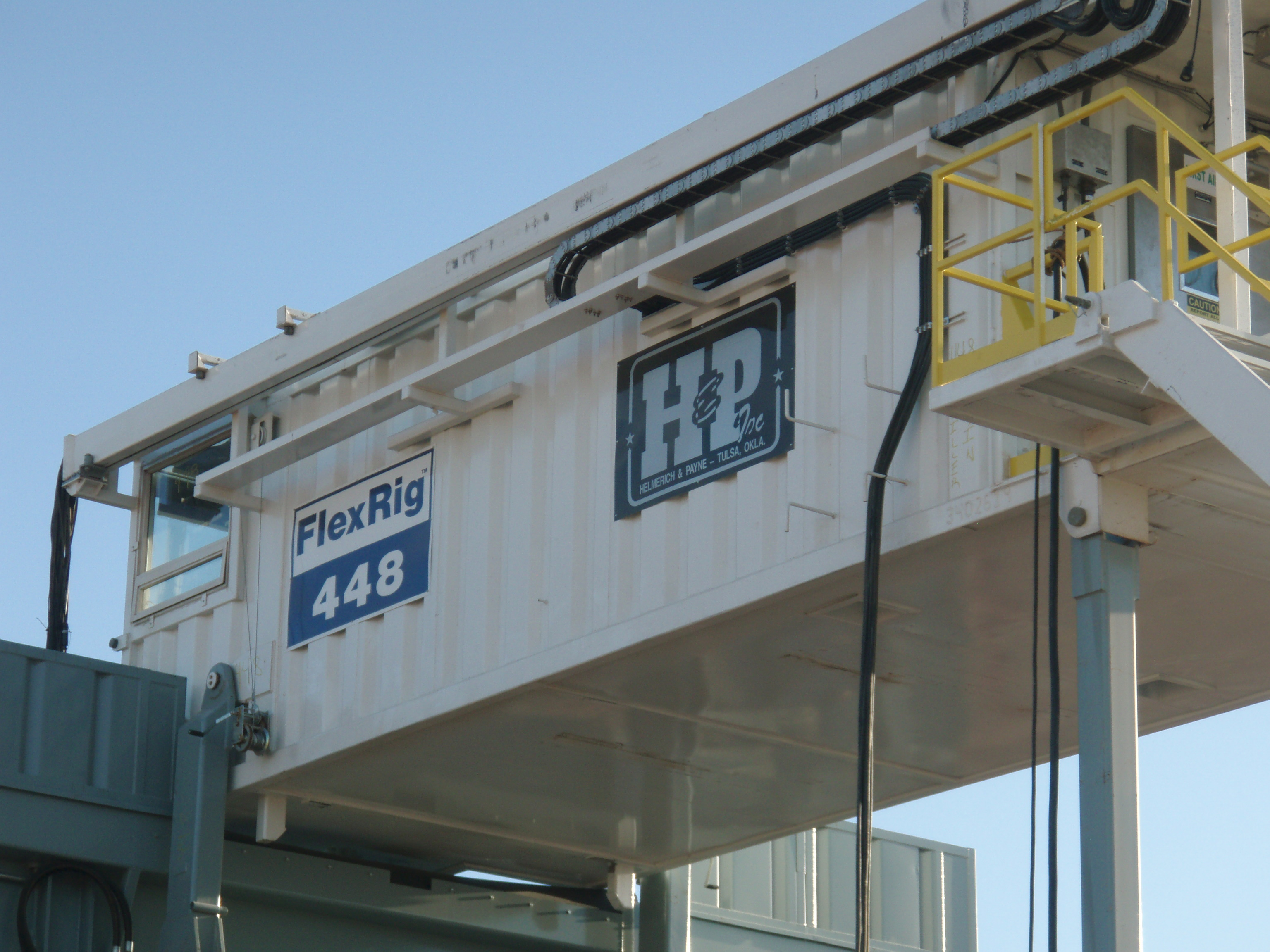
Dog House at the 448

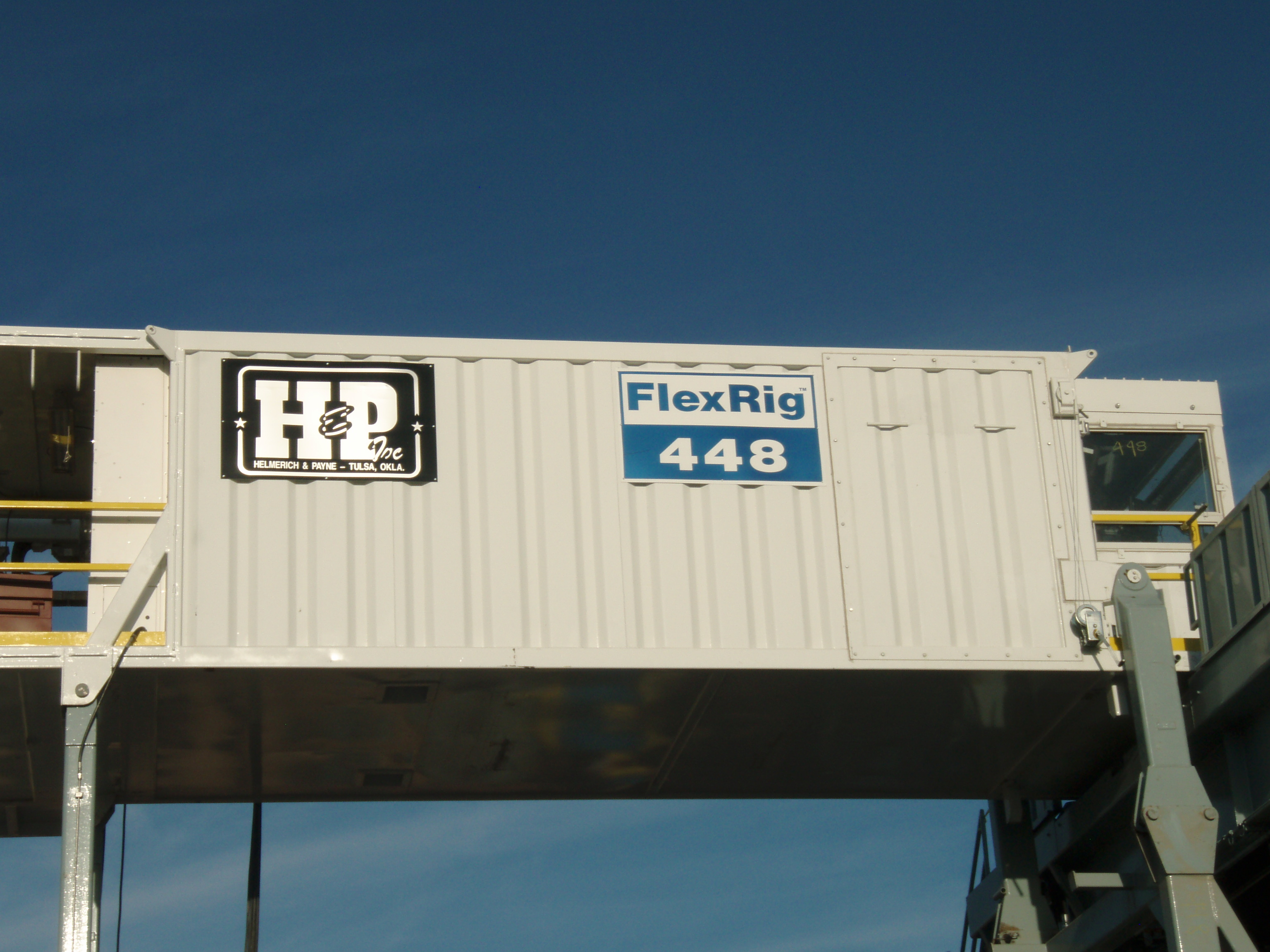
Flex Rig Dog House
