= Andrew Kishino =

Canadian voice actor

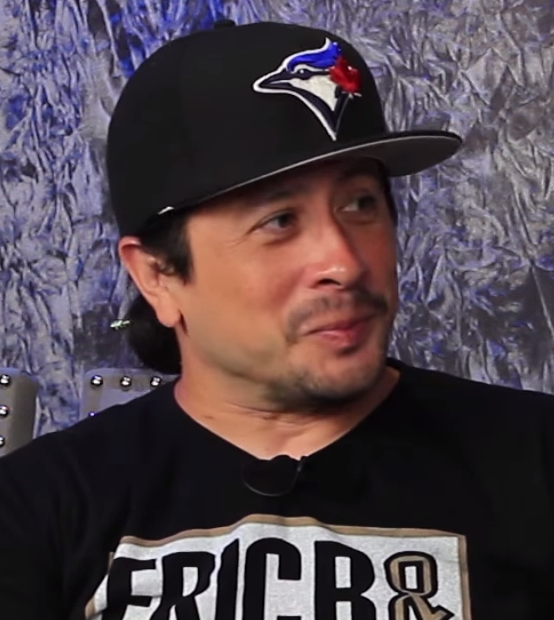
- Kishino in 2017
- Born: Toronto, Ontario, Canada
- Other names: Kish; Big Kish
- Occupation: Voice actor
- Years active: 1991–present
- Spouse: Vanessa Marshall (m. 2001; div. 2007)
- Website: andrewkishino.com

Andrew Kishino also known as Big Kish (formerly Kish), is a Canadian voice actor.

== Life and career ==
As a musician, Kishino is best known for his 1991 single "I Rhyme the World in 80 Days". The song was featured on his debut album, Order from Chaos. It was accompanied by a music video which was played on MuchMusic. The song reached number one on the RPM Cancon chart. The second single released from the album, "She's a Flirt", also reached number one on the same chart. His follow-up album, A Nation of Hoods, was released in 1994.

He later moved to Los Angeles to work as a hip hop music producer.

From 2001 to 2007, Kishino was married to voice actress Vanessa Marshall. They had no children. During their marriage, Kishino and Marshall founded the voice-over production company Marsh-Kish Productions.

Currently, Kishino is a voice-over artist; his roles include Janja on The Lion Guard, Kevin in Steven Universe, and Saw Gerrera on Star Wars: The Clone Wars and The Bad Batch.

== Discography ==
Year	Album
1991	Order From Chaos
1994	A Nation of Hoods

== Filmography ==
=== Animation ===
Year	Title	Role	Notes	Source
2006	The Grim Adventures of Billy & Mandy	Referee, Player #41	Episode: "The Wrongest Yard"	
2008–09	The Spectacular Spider-Man	Kenny Kong, Ned Lee, Bodyguard		
2010–11	G.I. Joe: Renegades	Storm Shadow, Frostbite, Tripwire, Stalker, additional voices		
2011	The LeBrons	Ray Ray, Pitbull, additional voices		
2012	Star Wars: The Clone Wars	Saw Gerrera	4 episodes	
2012–13	Kaijudo	Master Benjirou Kimora, Saguru, Grandpa Raiden Okamoto, additional voices		
2012–16	Teenage Mutant Ninja Turtles	Fong, Sid, additional voices		
2013	Regular Show	Gamemaster, Doug McFarlane, Tommy		
2013	Sanjay and Craig	Ninja #1, Karate Master, Sumo Guy	Episode: "Game On"	
2013	The Legend of Korra	Big Chou	Episode: "Beginnings"	
2015	We Bare Bears	Announcer	Episode: "Viral Video"	
2015	Mixels	Niksput	Episode: "Mixel Moon Madness"	
2015–17	Steven Universe	Kevin, Derrick	Recurring role	
2016	The Mr. Peabody & Sherman Show	Koikawa Harumachi	Episode: "Koikawa Harumachi"	
2016–19	The Lion Guard	Janja, Hitashi, Ora	Main cast	
2017	Be Cool, Scooby-Doo!	Dr. Kimura, Chef	2 episodes	
2017	Star Wars Rebels	Captain Hark		
2017–18	Stretch Armstrong and the Flex Fighters	Man, Flexarium Monsters, additional voices		
2018	Baki	Tateoka, Clown, Paramedic, additional voices	English dub	
2018	Family Guy	Goose	Episode: "Pawtucket Pete"	
2019; 2022	Young Justice	Mantis, Jax-Ur	2 episodes	
2020	Scooby-Doo and Guess Who?	Robot, Caterer, Boxer	Episode: "The Crown Jewel of Boxing!"	
2020	Animaniacs	Yakuza Son	Episode: "No Brainer"	
2020	ThunderCats Roar	Jackalman		
2020–2022	Madagascar: A Little Wild	Various voices	8 episodes	
2021	Star Wars: The Bad Batch	Saw Gerrera, Imperial Technician	2 episodes	
2021	Star Wars: Visions	Izuma, Mangrave Juro, Steward Droid	2 episodes; English dub	
2021	The World Ends with You: The Animation	Koki Kariya	English dub	
2021	Baki the Grappler	Yamamoto	English dub	
2021–present	One Piece	Raizo		
2021–2022	Jurassic World Camp Cretaceous	Daniel Kon	12 episodes	
2021–2022	Dogs in Space	Cy-bark	2 episodes	
2022	Love, Death & Robots	Private Erwin	Episode: "Kill Team Kill"	
2022	Vampire in the Garden	Kagyu, Instructor	English dub	
2022	Tales of the Jedi	Hanel	Episode: "Choices"	
2023	Record of Ragnarok	Hanemon Seki, Ebisu, Urakaze	English dub	
2023	Bastard!! Heavy Metal, Dark Fantasy	Schen Karr	English dub	
2023	Ōoku: The Inner Chambers	Katsuta Yorihide, Unokichi, Toku	English dub	
2024	Jurassic World: Chaos Theory	Daniel Kon	3 episodes	
2024	Star Wars: Young Jedi Adventures	Feb Rozo, Hutt Guard	Episode: "Battle for the Band"	
2024	Go! Go! Loser Ranger!	Soujirou Ishikawa	English dub	
2025	Secrets of the Silent Witch	Count Kerbeck, Head Master	English dub	
2026	Star Wars: Visions Presents – The Ninth Jedi	Juro	English dub	
2026-present	Avatar: Seven Havens	Hamka, Various voices		

=== Films ===
Year	Title	Role	Notes	Source
2008	Turok: Son of Stone	Additional voices		
2012	Superman vs. The Elite	The Hat	Direct-to-video	
2014	Naruto the Movie: Blood Prison	Maroi	English dub	
2014	Scooby-Doo! Ghastly Goals	Security Guard	Direct-to-video	
2016	Batman: The Killing Joke	Murray	Direct-to-video	
2018	Marvel Rising: Secret Warriors	Bully, S.H.I.E.L.D. Agent, Teacher	Television film	
2019	Jake and Kyle Get Wedding Dates	Calvin	Direct-to-video	
2019	Batman vs. Teenage Mutant Ninja Turtles	Shredder	Direct-to-video	
2021	New Gods: Nezha Reborn	Ao Guang	English dub	
2021	Words Bubble Up Like Soda Pop	Toughboy	English dub	
2022	Belle	Jellinek	English dub	
2022	Catwoman: Hunted	Mr. Yakuza, Domino 6, Leviathan Guard	Direct-to-video	
2022	Mobile Suit Gundam: Cucuruz Doan's Island	Danan Rashica	English dub	
2023	The Monkey King	Havoc Demon, King Yama		
2024	Maboroshi	Mamoru Sagami	English dub	
2024	Ghost Cat Anzu	Tetsuya	English dub	
2025	The Day the Earth Blew Up: A Looney Tunes Movie	Floor Manager		

=== Announcer/Narration ===
Year	Title	Notes	Source
2006	E! True Hollywood Story	Episode: "Snoop Dogg"	
2007	ESPN Hollywood	3 episodes	
2008	The Best Damn Sports Show Period	1 episode	
2009-12	Beef: The Series	6 episodes	
2012	Family Game Night	14 episodes	
2017	Jade City	Audiobook narration	
2019	Jade War	Audiobook narration	
2021	Jade Legacy	Audiobook narration	
2023	MCU: The Reign of Marvel Studios	Audiobook narration	

=== Video games ===
Year	Title	Role	Notes
2004	EverQuest II	Lieutenant Fenwell, Froglok Ghoul Assassin, Liege Aquila	
2005	Age of Empires III	Admiral Jinhai, Enemy Daimyo, Outlaw	
2005	Gun	Additional voices	
2006	Driver: Parallel Lines	Additional voices	
2006	Saints Row	Playa, Donnie, Saints	
2006	Lost Planet: Extreme Condition	Yuri Solotov	
2007	Spider-Man 3	Dragon Tail Thug, additional voices	
2007	Lair	Wingman	
2007	Transformers: The Game	Jazz	
2007	Transformers Decepticons	Jazz	
2007	Transformers Autobots	Jazz	
2007	The World Ends with You	Koki Kariya	
2007	Ratchet & Clank Future: Tools of Destruction	Device Grummel	
2007	TimeShift	Krone Police	
2007	Uncharted: Drake's Fortune	Pirates	
2008	Lost Planet: Colonies	Yuri Solotov	
2008	Kung Fu Panda	Goose, Wang Chow, Vulture	
2008	Metal Gear Solid 4: Guns of the Patriots	Soldiers	
2008	Mercenaries 2: World in Flames	Jamaican Pirate	
2008	The Rise of the Argonauts	Comeas	
2008	Saints Row 2	Donnie, DJ Kish, DJ Ziggy	
2008	Command & Conquer: Red Alert 3	Imperial Tankbuster, Prospector	
2008	Kung Fu Panda: Legendary Warriors	Zeng, Gorilla Goon, Rat Goon	
2008	Call of Duty: World at War – Final Fronts	Tucker	
2008	Call of Duty: World at War	Tucker	Uncredited
2009	Halo Wars	Warthog, Vulture, Wolverine	
2009	MadWorld	Sam Yung, Patient, Man B	
2009	X-Men Origins: Wolverine	Knife Soldier, Machine Gunner	
2009	Bionic Commando	Grunt #2	
2009	Transformers: Revenge of the Fallen	Jazz, Breakaway	
2009	G.I. Joe: The Rise of Cobra	Night Creeper	
2009	Marvel: Ultimate Alliance 2	Officer Swanson	
2009	Undead Knights	Remus Blood	
2010	Lost Planet 2	Additional voices	
2010	Blur	Tsubasa	Unused Cutscene
2011	Bulletstorm	Ishi Sato	
2011	SOCOM U.S. Navy SEALs	Chung	
2011	Mortal Kombat	Shang Tsung, Sektor	
2011	Dead or Alive: Dimensions	Genra	
2011	Ace Combat: Assault Horizon	Co-Pilot	
2011	Saints Row: The Third	Pedestrians	
2012	Prototype 2	Additional voices	
2012	Resident Evil: Operation Raccoon City	Vector	
2012	Starhawk	Rifters, Outcast	
2012	The Secret World	De la Gaurdia, Dae-Su, Joe Madahando, Nassir, Iorgu, Dragan Dzoavich, additional voices	
2012	Halo 4	Additional voices	
2013	Marvel Heroes	Living Laser	
2013	The Last of Us	Additional voices	
2013	Saints Row IV	Big Kish	
2013	Lego Marvel Super Heroes	Falcon, Ghost Rider, Hogun, Juggernaut, Kurse, Iron Fist, Silver Samurai	
2013	Batman: Arkham Origins	Criminals, Penguin Thugs, Prisoners	
2013	Lightning Returns: Final Fantasy XIII	Stagehand, Station Manager, The Meat Grill	
2014	The Elder Scrolls Online	Orc, Male Khajiit #2	
2014	Skylanders: Trap Team	Mut, Bird Blocker #3	
2014	Call of Duty: Advanced Warfare	Additional voices	
2015	Code Name: S.T.E.A.M.	Tin Man	
2015	Battlefield Hardline	Additional voices	
2015	Batman: Arkham Knight	Henchman	
2015	Lego Dimensions	Additional voices	
2015	The Park	The Bogeyman, Doctor, Guard	
2015	Halo 5: Guardians	Additional voices	
2016	XCOM 2	US Soldier	
2016	Mirror's Edge: Catalyst	Additional voices	
2016	Final Fantasy XV	Additional voices	
2017	For Honor	Viking Soldier	
2017	Horizon Zero Dawn	Tulemak, additional voices	Frozen Wilds DLC
2017	Mass Effect: Andromeda	Additional voices	
2017	Fortnite	Trailblazer A.C., Henchmen	
2018	Naruto to Boruto: Shinobi Striker	Avatar	
2019	Days Gone	Manny	
2019	Death Stranding	Owen Southwick	
2019	Star Wars Jedi: Fallen Order	Additional voices	
2020	Final Fantasy VII Remake	Beck	
2020	Maneater	Male NPC	
2020	Fallout 76: Wastelanders	Jonah Ito, Rocco, Radio Signal, Cultists, Raiders	DLC
2020	Spider-Man: Miles Morales	Roxxon Security	
2021	Neo: The World Ends with You	Koki Kariya	
2021	Lost Judgment	Hidemi Bando	
2022	Ghostwire: Tokyo	Man E	
2022	Star Ocean: The Divine Force	Additional voices	
2023	Street Fighter 6	Rewancha	
2024	Like a Dragon: Infinite Wealth	Yutaka Yamai	
2024	Rise of the Rōnin	Tanetsugu Oishi	
2024	Batman: Arkham Shadow	James	
2024	Marvel Rivals	Hawkeye, Master Weaver	
2025	Like a Dragon: Pirate Yakuza in Hawaii	Tsukasa Sagawa	
2025	Yakuza 0 Director's Cut	Tsukasa Sagawa	
2026	Order of the Sinking Star	The Trader	

=== Television ===
Year	Title	Role	Notes
2008	iGo to Japan	Japanese Voice	Television film
2010	Hot in Cleveland	Movie Trailer Voice	Episode: "The Play's the Thing"; uncredited
2012–13	Jimmy Kimmel Live!	Various Voices	5 episodes
2013	Tosh.0	Infomercial	Episode: "Security Officer Jay"
2016	The Odd Couple	NY Mets Stadium Announcer	Episode: "Madison & Son"; uncredited
