= Heartfire =

1998 novel by Orson Scott Card

HeartFire
- Front cover
- Author: Orson Scott Card
- Cover artist: Dennis Nolan
- Language: English
- Series: The Tales of Alvin Maker
- Genre: Fantasy, alternate history
- Publisher: Tor Books
- Publication date: 1998
- Publication place: United States
- Media type: Print (Hardcover & Paperback)
- Pages: 336
- ISBN: 0-8125-0924-2
- OCLC: 41344560
- Preceded by: Alvin Journeyman
- Followed by: The Crystal City

Heartfire (1998) is an alternate history/fantasy novel by American writer Orson Scott Card. It is the fifth book in Card's The Tales of Alvin Maker series and is about Alvin Miller, the seventh son of a seventh son. Heartfire was nominated for the Locus Award in 1999.

== Plot summary ==
Alvin marries Peggy, and they conceive a daughter (not born by the end of the book).

Alvin, Verily Cooper, Arthur Stuart, and Mike Fink are joined by John James Audubon, a French-speaking painter of birds. This group go to a Puritan-dominated place near Boston and end up confronting the witch laws.

Meanwhile, Peggy has gone to the Crown Colonies - slave states that ruled by the Stuart dynasty in exile - in an attempt to free the slaves.

Purity is introduced, a Puritan girl whose parents were hanged for their knacks, which are considered witchcraft by the Puritans. Purity meets Alvin's band and Arthur Stuart tells her the whole story of their travels. Purity goes away convinced they are witches and tells a local witcher, Quill, who is evil and twists her words against her and the boys. Quill intends to hang them as well as Purity.

Alvin whisks away Arthur Stuart, Mike Fink, and Audubon by leading them into the greensong that lets them run hundreds of miles without tiring, but turning back without the others en route. Alvin gives himself up to the men sent to bring in the "witches" while Verily hides for the moment.

Quill has both Purity and Alvin running in tight circles to wear them down - a semi-legal form of torture, intended to make them confess to witchery. Verily comes by and loudly scolds Quill in front of the crowd, saying it's inhumane.

At the trial, Verily Cooper makes a case for overturning the witchery laws: in all previous witch trials, it was the witcher who brought up any connection with Satan, while the defendant had been too beaten down to resist. The judge, John Adams, is sympathetic, but realizes that a sudden overthrow of long-kept laws will cause social instability. However, based on Verily's evidence, he suspends the licenses of all witchers in New England for alleged misconduct; since, to reinstate their licenses, a witcher would have to prove his claims in a normal court, and since this is impossible, it effectively ends the practice of witch trials while leaving the laws on the books.

Calvin has come back to America from France with Honoré de Balzac, the French boy-writer. The two meet up with Peggy and Calvin gets himself in serious trouble.

== See also ==
- List of works by Orson Scott Card
