= Mike Fink =

American sailor and semi-legendary character (c. 1770/1780 – c. 1823)

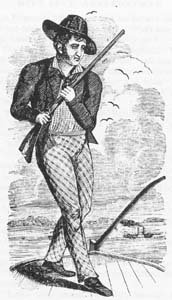
- An early drawing of Mike Fink, on a keelboat, with rifle in hand, ready to take on anyone who challenged him to a shooting match
- Born: c. 1770–1780; Fort Pitt, Province of Pennsylvania (British Royal Colony), present-day Pittsburgh, Pennsylvania
- Died: c. 1823 (aged 43–53); Rocky Mountains or Missouri River?
- Other names: Miche Phinck, Bangall, The Snapping Turtle
- Occupations: scout, hunter, keelboatman, riverman
- Known for: his near folklorish, tales and legends, as the Ohio and Mississippi keelboat riverman, who could outshoot, outfight, and outdrink all challengers

Mike Fink (also spelled Miche Phinck) (c. 1770/1780 – c. 1823), called "king of the keelboaters", was a semi-legendary brawler and river boatman who exemplified the tough and hard-drinking men who ran keelboats up and down the Missouri, Ohio, and Mississippi Rivers.

== Historical figure ==
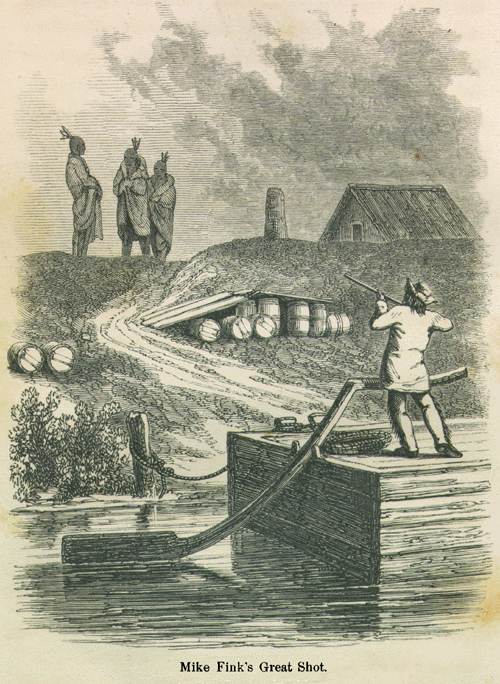
Mike Fink's Great Shot, a sketch by Thomas Bangs Thorpe, 1854

Mike Fink was born at Fort Pitt in present-day Pittsburgh, Pennsylvania and served as an Indian scout in his teenage years. As a teenager, he was an unbeatable marksman, and he earned the name "Bangall" among militiamen at Fort Pitt. When the Indian wars of the region ended in the mid-1790s, Fink, like many other scouts, spurned a sedentary life as a farmer. Instead, he drifted into the transport business on the Ohio and Mississippi – and quickly picked up a new nickname: "the snapping turtle".

When he began his career in navigation, he became notorious, both for his practical jokes and for his willingness to fight anyone who was not amused. At 180-pounds and 6'3" in height, and with the strength developed from having to push a keelboat upstream, he was a formidable opponent to most. It was said that he could drink a gallon of whisky and still shoot the tail off a pig at 90 paces, and Fink himself proclaimed on every possible occasion that he could "out-run, out-hop, out-jump, throw-down, drag out, and lick any man in the country".

The redoubtable but semi-mythical Mike Fink, joker, fighter, and king of the boatmen, voiced the sentiments of his class when he bellowed his boast:

"I'm a Salt River Roarer! I'm a ring-tailed squealer! I'm a reg'lar screamer from the ol' Massassip'! WHOOP! I'm the very infant that refused his milk before its eyes were open, and called out for a bottle of old Rye! I love the women an' I'm chockful o' fight! I'm half wild horse and half cockeyed-alligator and the rest o' me is crooked snags an' red hot snappin' turtle. I can hit like fourth-proof lightnin' an' every lick I make in the woods lets in an acre o' sunshine. I can out-run, out-jump, out-shoot, out-brag, out-drink, an' out fight, rough-an'-tumble, no holts barred, ary man on both sides the river from Pittsburg to New Orleans an' back again to St. Louiee. Come on, you flatters, you bargers, you milk-white mechanics, an' see how tough I am to chaw! I ain't had a fight for two days an' I'm spilein' for exercise. Cock-a-doodle-doo!"

He and his friends were supposed to have amused themselves by shooting cups of whiskey from each other's heads. Other repeating episodes of the Mike Fink legends include a tale where he shoots the scalp lock from the head of an Indian and a story in which he shoots with surgical precision the protruding heel from the foot of an African-American slave. Hauled into court, he pointed out to a judge that his victim would never have been able to wear a fashionable boot if a good Samaritan, namely himself, had not intervened on the man's behalf.

Besides imagined feats making part of the legend of Mike Fink, it may have also been woven from two (or more) men with the same name. Mike Fink signed up as one of Ashley's Hundred and formed a part of the band that built Fort Henry. If this man had been the one born at Fort Pitt about 1770, he would have been at least 50 years old. Such an advanced age in that group of teenage boys would have been remarked on. Hugh Glass, the mountain man who survived a grizzly bear mauling, was called "Old Hugh", for being in his early 40s. No journal mentions Fink's advanced age, so it may have been a younger Mike Fink who joined the expedition of the Ashley Rocky Mountain Fur Company.

Davy Crockett is supposed to have described him as "half horse and half alligator." Fink wore a red feather in his cap to signal his defeat of every strong man up and down the river.

Henry Howe's Historical Collections of Ohio contained an 1806 (1886?) interview with Capt. John Fink, who said that Mike Fink was a relative.

"When I was a lad," John told me, "about ten years of age, our family lived four miles up river from Wheeling, on the river. Mike laid up (landed) his boat near us, though he generally had two boats. This was his last trip, and he went away to the far West; the country there was getting too civilized, and he was disgusted with progress. This was about 1815."

Mike Fink—In the management of his business Mike Fink was a rigid disciplinarian; woe to the man who shirked his responsibilities or did not carry his own weight – literally. He always had his woman along with him and would allow no other man to speak with her. She was sometimes a subject for his wonderful skill in marksmanship with the rifle. He would have her hold on the top of her head a tin cup filled with whiskey, which he would put a bullet through. Another of his feats was to have her hold it between her knees, as in a vise, and then shoot."

According to the Miami Valley Historical Society (specifically, Miami Valley Vignettes by George C. Crout), until 1815, when he moved west. Mike Fink did not operate keel boats on the Ohio but on the Great Miami River from the Ohio River to Fort Loramie, where portage was made to the Maumee River in order to continue going on up to Lake Erie.

If it was indeed he who joined Ashley's Hundred, Fink died in the Rocky Mountains in 1823 during the course of Ashley's expedition. Some say it was a drunken argument over what he always called a chère amie – a romantic interest. Timothy Field in 1829 said that in a drunken stupor, when aiming at a mug of beer from the head of his longtime friend, a companion named Carpenter, he shot low; shortly thereafter, his other longtime friend, Talbot, retaliated by killing Fink, using Carpenter's pistol.

== In popular culture ==
The recorded exploits of Mike Fink featured mostly in American broadside ballads, dime novels, and other subliterary texts from before the Civil War era. The first known reference to the character is in an 1821 farce, The Pedlar by Alphonso Wetmore. Here, Fink appears as the stereotypical bully and braggart. He appears frequently in stories involving the Davy Crockett cycle, but Fink lacked Crockett's more admirable traits.

Over time, the unlikeable features of the character came even more to the forefront, and Fink was portrayed increasingly as a bully who got his comeuppance. After the Civil War, the character began to be neglected; the mood of Americans disinclined them to admire a bumptious and violent folk hero. In the early 20th century, there was an attempt to revive his popularity, spearheaded by Colonel Henry Shoemaker, a Pennsylvania folklorist, who collected Mike Fink tales, and saw the character as a local equivalent to Crockett, but Shoemaker's attempt at reviving the character sputtered.

In 1955, Mike Fink (as portrayed by character actor Jeff York) appeared in two episodes of the Davy Crockett miniseries of ABC's Disneyland opposite the popular Davy Crockett (portrayed by Fess Parker). These episodes were later compiled into a feature film entitled Davy Crockett and the River Pirates, released in 1956. Elements of the Fink legend were present in Walt Disney's rendition, but the character was played mostly for laughs as a foil for the infallible Crockett. Keel boats bearing Fink's name, Mike Fink Keel Boats, operated at Disneyland and the Magic Kingdom's Liberty Square until they were quietly retired in the late 1990s, when one unexpectedly capsized and dumped guests and cast members into the river. The ride was permanently closed in 2001, but the docks called Mike Fink's Keel Boat Landing remained an attraction in Frontierland until they were demolished in 2026.

In 1958, Zachary Ball, known as an author who wrote adventure stories for boys, wrote a fictional account of the early life of Mike Fink entitled Young Mike Fink. Similar to Disney's portrayal of Fink, Ball's title character is good-natured and helpful despite his sometimes hooligan and contrary temperament.

Mike Fink also appears in Eudora Welty's parodic fairy-tale The Robber Bridegroom.

In Orson Scott Card's The Tales of Alvin Maker, an alternate version of Mike Fink appears in every novel after the first. Unlike other significant characters, he has no magical knack, but, prior to meeting Alvin, he was made invincible by means of a tattoo given to him at birth (similar to Achilles). In the books, his invulnerability is what made him a bully; having no conception of pain, he could not appreciate the effects of his actions (Prentice Alvin). In Alvin Journeyman, he resurfaces, grateful to Alvin for both sparing his life and teaching him the folly of his previous life of violence.

Mike Fink is played by Forrest Tucker in the 1977 made-for-TV film The Incredible Rocky Mountain Race, in which Fink is pitted in a rivalry against Mississippi riverboater and future author Mark Twain in a cross-country scavenger hunt, although the real-life Twain was born twelve years after Fink's death. Much of the story and its humor is culled from Twain's various works.

In 1998, children's author Steven Kellogg, wrote a book entitled Mike Fink: A Tall Tale. As in his other books, Kellogg's account of Fink incorporates tall tales with vivid illustrations – highlighting the main character's positive side.

Mike Fink is a prime character in the 2007 young-adult historical novel Mississippi Jack by Louis A. Meyer. In it, Fink is outwitted by the main character of the book series. He is portrayed as a large, hairy, loud man who constantly boasts about his many feats in life. He is first met while traveling down the Allegheny River and is later seen in Pittsburgh, where he is put in jail for fighting.

On the Ohio River in Cincinnati, OH and Covington, KY, a riverboat restaurant called Mike Fink's was a popular attraction for over 40 years. It specialized in fresh seafood and had a large raw bar in the center of the boat. It closed in 2008 and was moved in 2014 to Newport, KY, with the hope it would be renovated and reopened. However, the boat ended up as a shop barge in 2019.

Mike Fink also appears in Fate/Grand Order as an enemy.

There are some tall tales that mention he had a daughter named Sal Fink, who was said to be equally daring and known for her holler.

Released in August 2025, the song "Broadside Ballad" by Daniel Donato's band Cosmic Country memorializes the exploits of Mike Fink.

== See also ==
- Tall tales
- Keelboats
