= The Fifth Season (novel) =

2015 novel by N. K. Jemisin

- Softcover edition
- Author: N. K. Jemisin
- Cover artist: Lauren Panepinto
- Language: English
- Series: The Broken Earth trilogy
- Genre: Science fantasy
- Publisher: Orbit
- Publication date: August 4, 2015
- Media type: Print, e-book, audio book
- Pages: 512
- Awards: Hugo Award for Best Novel (2016)
- ISBN: 978-0-356-50819-1
- Followed by: The Obelisk Gate

The Fifth Season is a 2015 science fantasy novel by American writer N. K. Jemisin. It was awarded the Hugo Award for Best Novel in 2016. It is the first volume in the Broken Earth series and is followed by The Obelisk Gate and The Stone Sky.

The Fifth Season takes place on a planet with a single supercontinent called the Stillness. Every few centuries, its inhabitants endure what they call a "Fifth Season" of catastrophic climate change.

== Society ==
The society of the Stillness is broken up into many "comms", "use-castes", ethnicities and species.

- Orogenes: People with the ability to control energy, particularly that of the ground (directly) and temperature (indirectly). They can cause and prevent earthquakes, and when angered can unintentionally kill living things in their "torus", or area of influence, by extracting the heat from their bodies to use as energy to manipulate the ground. When this occurs, a visible circle of frost appears around them and living things can be flash-frozen solid. They are widely hated and feared, and many are murdered by small-town mobs when their powers are discovered in childhood. If they are not killed by their family or community, they are given to a Guardian, to be trained at a location called the Fulcrum inside the city of Yumenes. Fulcrum-trained orogenes are marked by their black uniforms and are tolerated slightly better than untrained orogenes, in that they are not murdered quite as often. They wear rings on their fingers to denote rank, ten-ring being the highest. The slur "rogga" is used against orogenes, who likewise call non-orogenes "stills". The orogenes of the Fulcrum are tasked with servicing the comms of the Stillness in many different ways, such as clearing debris, reproducing inside the compound and quelling micro-shakes.
- Guardians: Warriors, hunters, and assassins tasked with controlling orogenes through pain and training or, alternatively, execution. They are the order that watches the Fulcrum.
- Geomests: Academics who study "geomestry", which seems to be a discipline unique to the Stillness, combining the study of geology with chemistry and other physical sciences.
- Commless: People without the protection of a settlement or "comm", either by choice or due to expulsion from a comm.
- Stone Eaters: Long-lived, moving sculpture-like beings who can move through rock, which is also their diet.
- Sanzed Equatorial Affiliation: The ruling Empire, informally known as Old Sanze.
- Equatorials People who live in the more stable and wealthy equatorial-region cities such as Yumenes and Dibars.
- Midlatters: People of either the north (Nomidlats) or south (Somidlats) areas adjacent to the equator zone. Considered backwater. Most Midlatters are multiracial.

=== Use-castes ===
- Strongbacks: A laborer caste. Excess Strongbacks are thrown out of comms during Seasons.
- Resistants: A caste of people thought to be resistant to sickness or famine. They care for the sick, clean latrines, and perform other health and hygiene-related tasks.
- Breeders: The caste assigned to keep a comm's numbers stable. They produce children themselves or authorize comm members with desirable traits to have children. Unauthorized children produced during a Season are not granted a share of the comm's stores and may therefore starve.
- Innovators: An inventor/intellectual caste. Engineers, doctors, and other problem-solvers.
- Leadership: A caste of people trained to run the comm or other important organizations. Can be pushed into leadership against their will, if the comm has sufficient need.

== Plot ==
In the prologue, an extraordinarily powerful orogene discusses the sad state of the world and laments the oppression of his people. He then uses his enormous power to fracture the entire continent across its length, threatening to cause the worst Fifth Season in recorded history. The story then follows three female orogenes (Essun, Damaya, and Syenite) from across the Stillness.

=== Essun ===
Essun is a middle-aged woman with two young children living in a small southern comm named Tirimo. Secretly, she is an orogene, a human with the ability to manipulate earth and stone by absorbing or redirecting heat and energy from elsewhere. Her children have orogenic abilities as well, which often manifest themselves subconsciously, requiring Essun to constantly work to avoid their discovery. One day, she arrives home to find her young son has been beaten to death by her husband after inadvertently revealing his orogenic abilities. Her husband has taken their daughter and left town. Numb with grief and rage, she instinctually shunts the massive earthquake from the events of the prologue, which has just arrived from up north, around the comm which saves it from complete destruction, but alerts the townspeople an orogene is present.

Due to the massive earthquake and ominous signs coming from the North, the townspeople are aware that a Fifth Season is likely imminent. When Essun attempts to leave the village to follow her husband and reclaim her daughter, she is outed as an orogene, and an angry mob attempts to kill her. In a rage, she kills many townspeople by leeching the heat from their bodies, freezing them solid, accidentally destroying the comm's only water supply in the process.

Soon after leaving the comm, she encounters Hoa, a strange boy with ice-white skin and hair, who begins following her. Later, she meets Tonkee, a commless and curious woman. Together, they journey south, encountering the vast devastation caused by the "rifting" up north. Eventually, they arrive at a hidden comm called Castrima, built in a huge underground geode.

=== Damaya ===
Damaya is a young girl in a northern comm, recently discovered by her parents to be an orogene. Unable to bring themselves to kill her, they summon Schaffa, a Guardian, to collect her. The Guardians are an ancient order of humans with supernatural abilities whose sole task is to manage and control orogenes. They control the Fulcrum, an organization that trains orogenes to use their abilities in a controlled fashion; nevertheless, orogenes remain a hated and feared sub-class with no rights of their own.

As the two travel from Damaya's home to the Fulcrum, Schaffa begins the training that Damaya will need in order to become a trained orogene. In his first lesson, Schaffa breaks Damaya's hand, challenging her to control her powers even when in great pain. His job, he tells her, is to keep the world safe from her. When she passes his test, they continue on their journey.

Damaya learns quickly and progresses through the ranks of young orogenes (called grits). One night, a young girl sneaks into the Fulcrum masquerading as a grit, who turns out to be the young daughter of a wealthy and politically connected family, curious about the interior of the largest building. Damaya reluctantly helps her enter, where they find a huge faceted pit, lined with sharp iron shards. Damaya is discovered, and one of the Guardians, who seems to be acting strangely, attempts to kill her; however, Schaffa steps in and spares Damaya's life by killing the strange Guardian. He also tells her that she will need to immediately take her first ring test—a test not normally given to orogenes until they have had much more training. In this way, Schaffa is giving her a chance to save herself because though she may have broken the Fulcrum's rules, if she can prove that she can be a trained and useful orogene, the Guardians will let her live. Damaya passes the test, is formally inducted into the Fulcrum, and is allowed to choose her new name.

=== Syenite ===
Syenite, a rising orogene star in the Fulcrum, is forcibly partnered with Alabaster, the most powerful living orogene, in order to conceive a child with him while on a mission to the countryside. Though they loathe each other, they have no choice in the matter. As they travel to their destination, Alabaster frequently alludes to hidden knowledge about the obelisks, strange crystals the size of buildings that drift amongst the clouds. They are assumed by most to be inert leftovers from a long-dead civilization.

Along the way, Alabaster shows her one of the node stations that the Fulcrum has positioned around the Stillness. Officially, each contains an orogene whose job it is to constantly quell small earthquakes that could endanger the larger continent, and it is assumed to be dull work. Alabaster reveals the truth, which is that the orogenes in the nodes have all been mutilated and lobotomized from an early age, causing them to quell all quakes by instinct, but leaving them barely alive. Alabaster implies that the boy in this node is one of his offspring, along with many of the orogenes in other nodes, as they mostly inherit the same strength he does, and yet there are almost no other at his level in the Fulcrum. Syenite is horrified by the discovery.

The two arrive at their destination, a coastal city that is losing business due to a large reef blocking the harbor; their task is to move the reef. However, soon after their arrival, Alabaster barely survives an assassination attempt, forcing Syenite to try to clear the harbor alone. To her shock, she discovers that the blockage is, in fact, an obelisk lying on its side underwater, which responds to her presence and rises up out of the water. Alarmed by this interaction, the Fulcrum sends a Guardian to kill them both. The Guardian succeeds in incapacitating Alabaster, and is just about to kill Syenite when she instinctively reaches out to the obelisk (which strangely also seems to have a Stone Eater trapped in it). The obelisk completely destroys the town and Syenite passes out.

Syenite awakens much later on a populated island off the coast, having been rescued along with Alabaster by a Stone Eater called Antimony. The island's leader is Innon, a very rare example of an untrained orogene living openly in society. She and Alabaster are accepted there, and both eventually enter into a loving polyamorous relationship with Innon. Syenite conceives a child with Alabaster, and raises him in peace on the island for a few years.

However, when Syenite quells the volcano formed due to her destruction with the Obelisk out of guilt, they are discovered by the Fulcrum, who sends multiple ships with Guardians to retrieve them. Alabaster is abducted by Stone Eaters before he can mount a successful defense. Innon is killed in front of Syenite by one of the Guardians, and Schaffa approaches to take her child from her. She smothers her child rather than allow it to suffer in the Fulcrum or be lobotomized for the node stations. In her grief and anger, she connects with a nearby obelisk, destroying the ship and killing most of the Guardians present as well as many fleeing islanders.

=== Essun ===
Reaching Castrima, Essun realizes that an old acquaintance has been waiting for her: Alabaster. Here it is revealed that Damaya, Syenite, and Essun are all the same woman at different points in her life (and also that Tonkee was the young girl who sneaked into the Fulcrum). Syenite (the older Damaya) and Alabaster survived the attack on the island, and she went into hiding as Essun to try to start a new life, while Alabaster has been living in enforced isolation amongst the Stone Eaters. Essun realizes that it was Alabaster who cracked the continent in half, triggering the present unparalleled Fifth Season. He states that it was necessary to accomplish his plan to finally end the Fifth Seasons, and concludes with: "Have you ever heard of something called a moon?"

== Characters ==
Names in the Stillness are denoted by given name followed by use-caste (profession) followed by comm (community, town, or city). For instance, Schaffa Guardian Warrant is a Guardian named Schaffa from the comm Warrant. Orogenes go by a (usually) geological-themed first name, the use-caste Orogene, and their comm, the Fulcrum.

- Damaya: a child who is given to a Guardian after she is discovered to be an orogene. She is from a comm called Palela in the Nomidlats (northern middle latitudes).
- Schaffa Guardian Warrant: a man responsible for Damaya's training. His skin is "almost white, he's so paper-pale; he must smoke and curl up in strong sunlight." He has "long flat hair" in "a deep heavy black." He has "silvery-gray" or "icewhite" eyes.
- Syenite: also known as Syen, an ambitious, four-ring level orogene of the Fulcrum, who is instructed to go on a mission with a higher level orogene named Alabaster.
- Alabaster: a ten-ring (highest) level orogene, capable of quelling super-volcanoes and of power and control beyond the capabilities of other orogenes. He has "skin so black it's almost blue," his hair is "dense, tight-curled stuff, the kind of hair that needs to be shaped if it's to look stylish," and he is "whipcord thin."
- Essun: an orogene mother of two, who leaves her small town of Tirimo to pursue her husband and daughter. Unlike the others, Essun's chapters are written in the second-person point of view, present-tense. She is described initially as "well-fleshed," with dreadlocked curly hair and skin that is "unpleasantly ocher-brown by some standards and unpleasantly olive-pale by others."
- Jija: Essun's husband, who kills their son Uche and kidnaps their daughter Nassun.
- Hoa: a mysterious boy who finds Essun in the woods and accompanies her on her journey. His coloring is completely white, including icewhite eyes. It later transpires that he is both a stone-eater and the narrator of Essun's chapters.
- Feldspar: Syenite's instructor at the Fulcrum, who orders her to go on a mission with Alabaster to clear a coral blockage in the Allia harbor.
- Tonkee Innovator Dibars (aka Binof Leadership Yumenes): a transgender woman and daughter of a powerful family who enlists the help of Damaya as children. Later encountered as a university-trained but commless geomest (a scientist who studies the earth, chemistry, and physics) who now lives in a cave.
- Innon Resistant Meov: a leader of an island community of pirates. He is described as an outgoing "six-and-a-half-foot-tall man with a huge mane of braids and clothes from three different nations—all of it garish."

Minor characters:

- Lerna: a young doctor in Tirimo who takes care of Essun briefly after her son's death.
- Rask Innovator Tirimo: the town's elected headman.
- Muh Dear: Damaya's grandmother.
- Damaya's mother and father, a Strongback and a Resistant.
- Asael Leadership Allia: one of six deputy governors of Allia.
- Heresmith Leadership Allia: the lieutenant governor of Allia.
- Ykka Rogga Castrima: a leader of Castrima, the underground comm to which Essun, Hoa, and Tonkee travel.

== Reception ==
The New York Times' review stated "The Fifth Season invites us to imagine a dismantling of the earth in both the literal and the metaphorical sense, and suggests the possibility of a richer and more fundamental escape. The end of the world becomes a triumph when the world is monstrous, even if what lies beyond is difficult to conceive for those who are trapped inside it." NPR wrote that "Jemisin brilliantly illustrates the belief that, yes, imaginative world-building is a vital element of fantasy—but also that every character is a world unto herself."

In August 2017 it was announced that The Fifth Season is being adapted for television by TNT with rapper and actor Daveed Diggs attached as an executive producer. In 2021, Jemesin announced that she had signed a seven-figure deal with TriStar Pictures to adapt The Fifth Season and the rest of the Broken Earth trilogy to film, seemingly confirming that the TNT adaptation was no longer in progress.

=== Awards ===
Year	Award	Category	Result	Ref.
2015	Nebula Award	Novel	Nominated	
2016	Hugo Award	Novel	Won	
2016	Dragon Award	Apocalyptic Novel	Nominated	
2016	Dragon Award	Fantasy Novel	Nominated	
2016	Locus Award	Fantasy Novel	Finalist	
2016	World Fantasy Award	Novel	Finalist	

The Fifth Season was awarded the Hugo Award for Best Novel at the 74th World Science Fiction Convention on August 20, 2016. It made Jemisin the second Black person to win the award.

== See also ==
- Orogeny (geological process)
