= Red Prophet =

1988 novel by Orson Scott Card

- Cover of first edition (hardcover)
- Author: Orson Scott Card
- Cover artist: Dennis Nolan
- Language: English
- Series: The Tales of Alvin Maker
- Genre: Fantasy, alternate history
- Publisher: Tor Books
- Publication date: 1988
- Publication place: United States
- Media type: Print (hardcover & paperback)
- Pages: 311 pp
- Award: Locus Award for Best Fantasy Novel (1989)
- ISBN: 0-312-93043-7
- OCLC: 16871980
- Dewey Decimal: 813/.54 19
- LC Class: PS3553.A655 R43 1988
- Preceded by: Seventh Son
- Followed by: Prentice Alvin

Red Prophet (1988) is an alternate history/fantasy novel by American writer Orson Scott Card. It is the second book in Card's The Tales of Alvin Maker series and is about Alvin Miller, the seventh son of a seventh son. Red Prophet won the Locus Award for Best Fantasy Novel in 1989, was nominated for the Nebula Award for Best Novel in 1988, and the Hugo Award for Best Novel in 1989.

== Setting ==
The book takes place in an alternate version of America in which people have special abilities known as "knacks". The characters are caught up in a plot with ramifications on the entire future of America involving alternate versions of Tenskwa-Tawa (the "prophet"), Ta-Kumsaw, William Henry Harrison, and even Napoleon and La Fayette.

== Plot summary ==
Lolla-Wossiky, a troubled, one-eyed, whiskey drinking "Red," leaves General William Henry Harrison's fort and heads north to find his "dream beast," the spirit that can save him from the pain of his memories. On his journey, he meets Alvin Miller Jr. and assists him in making an ethical decision that will shape his life forever. In appreciation, Alvin heals Lolla-Wossiky's painful memories, which allows him to give up alcohol and to become in touch with the land once again. Lolla-Wossiky grows into "the Prophet" but prefers to be known as Tenskwa-Tawa. Lolla-Wossiky preaches both pacifism and separatism and believes that "Reds" should live west of the Mississippi and "Whites" should live east of it.

Meanwhile, Lolla-Wossiky's brother, Ta-Kumsaw, tries to rally "Reds" behind his belief that their land should be defended violently. When Alvin Miller Jr. and his older brother Measure travel to the place of his birth, where Alvin is expected to become apprenticed to the Hatrack River blacksmith, the two brothers are captured by "Reds" (Native Americans) who were sent by Harrison intentionally to create conflict. Ta-Kumsaw, who as sent by Lolla-Wossiky, rescues the brothers from torture and death. Measure leaves the "Reds," only to be captured by Harrison's men and is subsequently beaten to the brink of death. Ta-Kumsaw accompanies Alvin to the holy site of Eight-Face Mound where they meet up with Taleswapper, an old friend of Alvin. Using the spiritual powers of the Eight-Face Mound, Alvin heals Measure from afar. Measure then stops some of the slaughter of Lolla-Wossiky's followers by villagers and Harrison's men over the alleged kidnapping and murder of Alvin and Measure Miller.

== Adaptation ==
A twelve-part comic book version of the novel was printed by Marvel's Dabel Brothers Productions imprint. One of the issues of the comic series featured on its cover a copy of the painting Engaging the Shawnee Village by John Buxton, which had been commissioned by the Heritage Center of Clark County, Ohio.

== Characters ==
- Ta-Kumsaw
- Tenskwa-Tawa, known as the prophet, he uses his "inner eye" to predict the future and help shape events to meet his predictions.
- William Henry Harrison
- Napoleon Bonaparte, Euh à knack to get his soldiers to be insanely loyal and willing to die for him.
- La Fayette
- Andrew "Hickory" Jackson

== See also ==
- List of works by Orson Scott Card
