= Untethered Sky =

2023 novella by Fonda Lee

- Author: Fonda Lee
- Language: English
- Publisher: Tordotcom
- Publication date: 11 Apr 2023
- Pages: 160 (hardcover)
- Awards: 2024 Aurora Award for Best Novelette/Novella
- ISBN: 9781250842466

Untethered Sky is a 2023 novella by Fonda Lee. It tells the story of Ester, a young woman who trains a roc after her family is killed by a manticore. It won the 2024 Aurora Award for Best Novelette/Novella.

== Plot ==
When Ester is thirteen, her mother and brother are killed by a manticore. Ester survives by hiding in a well. She vows to seek revenge against the monsters who killed her relatives. At eighteen, Ester travels to the Royal Mews and begins training to become a rukher. The kingdom’s rukhers fly giant rocs to manticores and other dangerous creatures.

Ester is partnered with a young roc named Zahra. She trains the creature and the two develop a bond. Ester also befriends two other rukhers, Nasmin and Darius. Nasmin is chosen to become an ambassador for the rukhers. Nasmin’s campaign increases public support for the king’s rukhers. As the years pass, the kingdom of Darsha expands. As humans settle in previously uninhabited territories, the number of manticore attacks increases.

In Ester’s sixth year as a rukher, the king announces a Great Hunt. Darius and Ester are assigned to the same company, along with their rocs Zahra and Minu. During the hunt, several soldiers are killed by a manticore. This manticore has heterochromia, revealing it to be the same creature that killed Ester’s mother and brother.

Ester’s company pursues the manticore for several parasangs. Suddenly, they encounter another company pursuing the same creature. The territorial rocs attack each other. Ester watches in horror as Nasmin’s roc attacks Minu. Nasmin attempts to recall her roc, but it refuses to listen to her. In the combat, Minu’s wing is broken by the manticore. Darius rushes in to save his partner. Minu is killed, Darius is severely wounded, and the manticore escapes. Nasmin, broken by her part in Minu’s death, retires from rukhing and eventually marries a merchant.

Ester leaves Darius to his recovery. On her way back to the Royal Mews, she passes through a village which has sighted the manticore that killed Minu. Zahra and Ester work together to kill the manticore. Ester is pinned beneath her own overturned chariot, wounding her leg. Zahra flies away with a wild male roc, leaving Ester stranded and injured. Ester is rescued by Darius, and they return to the Royal Mews together, hoping to be given the opportunity to bond with new rocs in the future.

== Major themes ==
Jeremy Brett wrote that the interaction between humans and animals has long been a trope explored in fiction. Relationships between dogs and humans are a common theme, while works such as Moby-Dick explore one-sided relationships. According to Brett, Untethered Sky is an uncommon example of a work which examines the "strangeness and foreignness of animals in relation to us". While Ester and Zahra share a partnership, "Lee is careful to point out at various points Zahra’s inherently wild, utterly foreign, and ultimately incomprehensible nature." This may lead readers to question their relationships with animals present in their own lives.

== Style ==
The novella is narrated by Ester in a first-person point of view.

== Background ==
In an interview with the CBC, Lee stated that the story originated with the ideas of manticores and rocs. Many fantasy novels feature "animal companions that are cute, benevolent or telepathically bonded with their human trainer." Lee wanted to portray a different type of bond between humans and magical creatures, so she chose to portray the rocs as dangerous wild animals. In an interview with Paste, Lee stated that she based much of the rukhers and their training on the modern practice of falconry. Because of the Persian origin of manticores and rocs, Lee researched the climate and ecology of modern-day Iran in order to create her fantasy setting. Lee intentionally chose to discard several historical elements during the creation of her work. For example, it would have been extremely rare for a woman of common birth to reach a position in the Persian royal court. Lee explained her choice as follows.

I felt quite free not to adhere to that in my fantasy world, where the widespread threat of manticores led to the development of the ruhking profession, and the only creatures that can kill manticores sometimes have strong gender preference (as parrots and other domestic birds often do).

The author also based the novel's religious background on a monotheistic faith. Many fantasy novels include polytheistic religious beliefs, which readers perceive to be "older and more primitive." Lee played with this expectation by creating a religion based on Zoroastrianism, which is both monotheistic and one of the oldest religions in the world.

== Reception and awards ==
John Mauro of Grimdark Magazine compared the novella positively to Lee's Green Bone books, stating that both are examples of nuanced character writing. The review felt that the "quiet restraint" and folktale qualities of Untethered Sky show Lee's versatility as an author. Mauro ultimately awarded the novella 5 stars out of a possible 5, calling it a "beautifully crafted gem."

Jeremy Brett of Ancillary Review of Books called the novella "a lovely, gripping story" and praised its exploration of human-animal interaction. Alana Joli Abbott also praised the depiction of rocs, which are "underused mythological creatures", as well as the relationships between the humans characters and these creatures. Linda Codega of Gizmodo stated that the book's worldbuilding balances the slim page count of the novella format with enough depth to feel effective. Codega praised the relationship between Ester and Zahra, calling it a "moving and sad" portrayal of a "tenuous bond." Civilian Reader praised the book's pacing and character development, writing that it contains more depth that its page count would suggest.

Bill Capossere of fantasyliterature.com awarded Untethered Sky 3.5 stars out of a possible 5 stars. He felt that the novella format was too short, preventing the book from reaching its full potential. Capossere praised the relationship between Ester, Darius, and Nasmin, as well as the human-roc bond. The reviewer felt that the foreshadowing was too blatant, and that the inclusion of the manticore which killed Ester's family was unnecessary. Capossere felt that the emotional payoff could have been stronger, but that fans of the novella format would likely still enjoy the book.

Year	Award	Category	Result	Reference
2023	Nebula Award	Novella	Nominated	
2024	Aurora Award	Novelette/Novella	Won	
2024	British Fantasy Award	Novella	Shortlisted	
