= Seventh Son (novel) =

1987 novel by Orson Scott Card

- Cover of first edition (hardcover)
- Author: Orson Scott Card
- Cover artist: Dennis Nolan
- Language: English
- Series: The Tales of Alvin Maker
- Genre: Fantasy, alternate history
- Publisher: Tor Books
- Publication date: 1987
- Publication place: United States
- Media type: Print (hardcover and paperback)
- Pages: 241
- Award: Locus Award for Best Fantasy Novel (1988)
- ISBN: 0-312-93019-4
- OCLC: 16268967
- Dewey Decimal: 813/.54 19
- LC Class: PS3553.A655 S4 1987
- Followed by: Red Prophet

Seventh Son (1987) is an alternate history/fantasy novel by American writer Orson Scott Card. It is the first book in Card's The Tales of Alvin Maker series and is about Alvin Miller, the seventh son of a seventh son. Seventh Son won a Locus Award and was nominated for both the Hugo and World Fantasy Awards in 1988. Seventh sons have strong "knacks" (specific magical abilities), and seventh sons of seventh sons are both extraordinarily rare and powerful. In fact, young Alvin appears to be the only one in the world. His abilities make him the target of the Unmaker, who recognizes Alvin's powers as those of a Maker, only the second ever, and it had been a long time since the first had walked on water and turned water to wine. The Unmaker works largely by water and tries to kill Alvin in his early years before he can master his abilities.

== Plot summary ==
Alvin's family is migrating west. When they try to cross the Hatrack River, an unknown force, known as the Unmaker, tries to stop the still-unborn Alvin from being born since Alvin would be the seventh son of a seventh son and therefore have incredible powers as a Maker. The force sends a tree down the river to crush the wagon the pregnant Mrs. Miller is riding in. Her eldest son, Vigor, diverts the tree but is mortally wounded in the act. Because a seventh son must be born while the other six are alive, Vigor desperately clings to life until Alvin is born.

Help is dispatched at the insistence of five-year-old "torch" (a person who, among other things, can see the life forces of people and, under certain conditions, their myriad alternate futures) Peggy Guester, who sees Alvin and Alvin's possible future as a Maker.

As the years pass, Alvin avoids numerous attempts of an unknown force trying to kill him and is often helped by the intervention of a mysterious protector. Alvin's father, a nonbeliever in God, believes that a water spirit is trying to kill Alvin. When Alvin is seven, a new Reverend, named Thrower, arrives in town and tries to build a church. Alvin's father refuses to help, but Mrs. Miller has all of her sons work on building the church. When the ridgebeam is being placed onto the church in construction, it shivers and breaks and seems about to fall on Alvin. However, mid-air, it breaks in two and misses Alvin, which is yet another example of Alvin's near-death experiences. When Alvin goes home, he provokes one of his sisters by poking her and so they get revenge on Alvin by putting needles into his night gown. Alvin avenges himself by using his knack to send cockroaches after his sisters. The plan works, and Alvin has a victory over his sisters. However, he then has a vision that he dubs Shining Man, who makes him promise to use his knack only for good.

When Alvin is ten, "Taleswapper" (William Blake), a traveling storyteller, arrives in the town that Alvin's parents have founded. After stopping by the house of Alvin's brother-in-law, who directs Taleswapper to the Miller house, he visits the church and notices that its altar has been touched upon by an evil entity. Reverend Thrower kicks him out, and Taleswapper goes to the Millers' place, where his timely intervention stops Mr. Miller from killing Alvin. Taleswapper is welcomed in and helps to put a name to the unknown force that tries to stop Alvin from realizing his true powers as a Maker: the Unmaker. Meanwhile, the Reverend Philadelphia Thrower becomes a tool of the Unmaker, the evil force that touched the altar.

Soon, the Miller family goes to a quarry to cut out a millstone. Here, one of Alvin's knacks is revealed since he singlehandedly cuts the millstone through hard rock. During the night, Taleswapper and Mr. Miller guard the millstone. Mr. Miller tells Taleswapper a story about how a force is trying to use him to kill Alvin. Taleswapper advises Mr. Miller to send Alvin away to somewhere he may be safe. The next day, the millstone is taken home. The Unmaker finally manages to injure Alvin by making a millstone fall on him. Taleswapper encourages him to heal himself. Alvin does so but finds that he cannot heal himself part of his bone. He realizes that he might need outside help to heal. Reverend Thrower, acting as a surgeon, attempts to kill him but finds himself blocked by a mysterious force. Alvin heals himself with the aid of his brother Measure, who performs the surgery. Alvin is contracted as an apprentice to a blacksmith in the town on the Hatrack River in which he was born.

Taleswapper meets Peggy. It is revealed that she, using her torch powers and Alvin's birth caul, had protected Alvin all of those years, and the Unmaker hurt Alvin with the millstone only because Alvin himself overrode her powers.

The book's sequel, which is second in the tales of Alvin's life, is Red Prophet.

== See also ==
- List of works by Orson Scott Card
