= The Crystal City =

2003 novel by Orson Scott Card

- Front cover
- Author: Orson Scott Card
- Cover artist: Dennis Nolan
- Language: English
- Series: The Tales of Alvin Maker
- Genre: Fantasy, alternate history
- Publisher: Tor Books
- Publication date: 2003
- Publication place: United States
- Media type: Print (Hardcover & paperback)
- Pages: 416
- ISBN: 0-312-86483-3
- OCLC: 52519083
- Dewey Decimal: 813/.54 21
- LC Class: PS3553.A655 C79 2003
- Preceded by: Heartfire
- Followed by: Master Alvin

The Crystal City (2003) is an alternate history/fantasy novel by American writer Orson Scott Card. It is the sixth book in Card's The Tales of Alvin Maker series and is about Alvin Miller, the seventh son of a seventh son.

== Plot summary ==
Alvin and Arthur stay at a boarding house in which mixed-blood children are cared for by Papa Moose and Mama Squirrel. There, Alvin uses his knack to cleanse the mosquitoes and disease from a well. A young woman, whom the people call Dead Mary, sees what he has done and asks him to come with her and heal her mother, who has yellow fever. Because Alvin heals her, yellow fever spreads throughout Nueva Barcelona (Louisiana) and averts an impending war with the United States over slavery. As the fever spreads, people begin to suspect Papa Moose and Mama Squirrel because Alvin has been healing everyone he can, which radiates outward through the city. Alvin is then approached by La Tia, an African woman, who wants him to help all the slaves and the displaced French to escape Nueva Barcelona. Alvin reluctantly agrees.

Alvin's brother, Calvin, at the behest of Alvin's wife, Margaret, comes to help. Calvin raises a thick fog, and Alvin uses his blood by magic that he learned from the Red Prophet Tenskwa-Tawa to construct a crystal bridge across Lake Ponchartrain to the north. Arthur helps Alvin with the bridge. While the escapees flee north, they take food and provision from plantations along the way and free any slaves they find. Alvin goes to Tenskwa-Tawa on the other side of the Mizzippy to ask for safe passage through the Red Man's lands so that they can escape the pursuing army. Alvin and Tenskwa-Tawa put on a show by holding back the Mizzippy River to allow the exodus of people from Nueva Barcelona to cross, and the pursuing army can do nothing but watch. Calvin leaves with Jim Bowie and Steve Austin to conquer the Mexica. Verily Cooper is sent by Margaret to seek out Abe Lincoln and get his help to figure out what to do with all the runaways when they reach the Noisy River Territory.

Alvin discovers that Tenskwa-Tawa has been collaborating with La Tia to create a volcanic eruption under the Mexica, who are becoming increasingly threatening. Alvin sends Arthur to initiate the eruption and warn his brother, Calvin, who ignores the warning but still manages to escape. Bowie and several others leave with Arthur. The people travel through the Indian lands using the greensong, which allows them to move more quickly. When they reach the Noisy River territory, Lincoln and Cooper have decided to create a new county so that they can appoint their own judges, who will resist the law to return slaves to their masters. There, Alvin starts to build the crystal city that he saw in a vision. He realizes that not everyone has to have maker skills, but people can contribute in their own way by felling trees, digging the foundation, etc. However, all is not well. Calvin and Bowie arrive and decide to stay.

== See also ==
- List of works by Orson Scott Card
