= Old soul =

Old soul or variants may refer to:

== Books ==
- "Old Souls", popular poem by Thomas Gordon Hake from The World's Epitaph (1866)
- Old Souls (book), by Tom Shroder (1999)
- Old Souls (story), a 2017 short story by Fonda Lee

== Music ==
- The Old Soul, Canadian indie rock band
- Old Soul (album), a 2023 album by Stephen Marley
- Old Souls (Deaf Havana album)
- Old Souls (Make Them Suffer album)
- Old Souls, three albums by Factor Chandelier
- "Old Souls", single by Jessica Harper as Phoenix from the musical Phantom of the Paradise 1974
- "Old Soul", track by John Scofield from Groove Elation
