= The Obelisk Gate =

Novel by N. K. Jemisin

- Softcover edition
- Author: N. K. Jemisin
- Cover artist: Arcangel Images and Lauren Panepinto
- Language: English
- Series: The Broken Earth trilogy
- Genre: Science fantasy
- Publisher: Orbit
- Publication date: 16 August 2016
- Publication place: United States
- Media type: Print, e-book
- Pages: 433
- Awards: Hugo Award for Best Novel (2017)
- ISBN: 978-0-356-50836-8
- OCLC: 932174108
- Preceded by: The Fifth Season
- Followed by: The Stone Sky

The Obelisk Gate is a 2016 science fantasy novel by N. K. Jemisin and the second volume in the Broken Earth series—following The Fifth Season, and preceding The Stone Sky. The Obelisk Gate was released to strong reviews and, like its predecessor in the series, won the Hugo Award for Best Novel.

== Setting ==
The Obelisk Gate takes place on a single supercontinent, the Stillness, which suffers from catastrophic climate change every few centuries (the so-called "Fifth Season"). The book continues forward from an especially bad Fifth Season, one that may become an apocalypse. It follows two main characters: a mother and daughter, both of whom are magically talented ("orogenes"), who were separated just before the most recent Fifth Season. The plot revolves around their journey to find each other again, and their efforts to discover why Fifth Seasons exist.

== Plot ==
The story is told primarily from the perspectives of Essun, a powerful orogene driven out of her home at the beginning of the first book, and Nassun, her 10 year-old daughter.

=== Schaffa ===
Schaffa, Essun's former Guardian, awakens underwater after Essun's devastating counterattack during the climax of The Fifth Season. He is about to drown when, out of desperation, he allows the entity (manifested as a force of pure rage) that powers his and the other Guardians' abilities to take control of his body for a brief period. Though he is saved from death, the resulting brain damage leaves him with profound memory loss, and he is unable to fully recall his past as a Guardian. He is rescued by a family of fishermen on the coast. His memory of being a Guardian is triggered by a young boy who needs him, and the two set out south in response to a vague half-remembered memory.

=== Nassun ===
The story resumes soon after Nassun's father discovers her brother is an orogene. In a blind rage, he beats Nassun's brother to death and deducing Nassun is likely an orogene as well, abducts her as he flees Tirimo, their hometown. He intends to take Nassun south, where he has heard of a group of Guardians that can "cure" Nassun of orogeny.

Nassun has always been close to her father, due largely to her strict and unforgiving relationship with her mother Essun, who has been secretly teaching her to hone her orogenic abilities in order to avoid detection. Nevertheless, she fears her father, who now is aware she is an orogene as well. Her father strikes her early in the journey, and is immediately overcome with guilt; Nassun, however, learns to harden her heart against him, and stops viewing him as her true father at all.

They move south through much hardship, and witness firsthand the devastation wrought by Alabaster's fracturing of the entire continent further north. The Fifth Season triggered by this event steadily worsens as they travel. Finally, they reach the promised settlement: a town called Found Moon, administered by a group of Guardians, though not affiliated with the Fulcrum. The town is led by Schaffa, who has used it to shelter young orogenes during the years since he arrived.

Nassun and her father settle in Found Moon, and Nassun begins to rapidly advance through the ranks of the makeshift Fulcrum the Guardians have established. She forms a particularly strong bond with Schaffa, who is fiercely protective of her and becomes her father figure in lieu of her biological father. She begins to understand that orogeny, in contrast to the teachings of her mother and the Guardians, is not just about moving heat energy from one place to another; she learns to perceive a mysterious silver energy, generated by living things, that underpins all of her orogenic powers. Her abilities increase to the point where she begins to learn to draw power from one of the obelisks floating nearby, much as her mother had many years earlier. Her use of this power causes her to accidentally kill one of her classmates by turning him to stone while suffering a nightmare.

As Nassun grows in her abilities, her father starts to realize she is not being "cured" of her "sickness". He confronts Schaffa and later attempts to kill Nassun. She reluctantly uses her powers to turn her father to stone as well.

=== Essun ===
Essun remains in Castrima, a comm that lives in a huge underground geode. Ykka, the comm's leader, is an orogene herself, and due to her influence, orogenes are permitted to live openly alongside others. The comm is sustained by many mysterious functions of the geode that appear to operate by magic, such as air recyclers and climate control; Ykka has deduced that the mechanisms only function when orogenes are present.

Also present in Castrima is Alabaster, Essun's former mentor and partner and an immensely powerful Fulcrum orogene. Alabaster is dying, his body slowly turning to stone as a consequence of using the energy of the obelisks to break the entire continent in half and trigger the current Fifth Season. He is watched over by a stone eater he has named Antimony, who appears to have an adversarial relationship with the mysterious "child" Hoa, now revealed to be a stone eater himself, who accompanied Essun as she fled Tirimo.

Alabaster begins imparting some of his knowledge to Essun concerning the obelisks and the nature of orogeny. As revealed at the end of The Fifth Season, the Moon has not been seen for at least several thousand years prior to the events of the book, and most are not aware it ever existed. Alabaster states that his fracturing of the continent was a method to generate enough raw geological heat and power to allow a sufficiently powerful orogene to use the obelisks to recapture the Moon and end the Fifth Seasons (its highly elliptical orbit is one of the reasons for the geologic instability of the Stillness). Alabaster is also aware of the silver energy Nassun discovered, which he identifies as magic, the true fundamental force that makes orogeny (and the mechanisms of Castrima) possible. He struggles to teach Essun to use it effectively as his condition deteriorates, all the while reconciling with Essun over the death of their child years ago. He finally dies, his body turning completely to stone, after expending the last of his strength to prevent Essun from killing everyone in Castrima and potentially the whole Stillness with the magical power of the obelisk.

Throughout, tensions within the society of Castrima are revealed, as the coexistence of orogenes and non-orogenic people (“stills”) within the community is uneasy at best. These issues are exacerbated by the appearance of a raiding party from a rival comm, Rennanis, who have left their home further north and intend to take Castrima by force. Initially unable to win in an outright attack, they besiege the comm by locating the ventilation shafts for the geode, intending to force them out into the open.

Having no choice, the inhabitants of Castrima prepare for battle. Rennanis' offensive is aided by their own faction of stone eaters, who are opposed to Alabaster and Antimony's plans. Facing the loss of her new home, Essun successfully uses Alabaster's training to repeat his accomplishment, tapping the power of all the obelisks worldwide to form the Obelisk Gate. She uses the immense power of the Gate to turn every inhabitant of Rennanis to stone simultaneously.

Castrima is saved, but the mechanisms of the geode have been irreparably damaged by the assault, and the comm faces starvation and suffocation if they remain. They begin preparations to set out into the worsening Fifth Season to find a new home.

== Reception ==
The Obelisk Gate was anticipated on its debut, and reviews were highly positive.

Writing for NPR, poet Amal El-Mohtar said that "Not only could I not put it down—I couldn't come up for air long enough to comment on it while forsaking sleep and food in order to finish it", continuing on to say that "It pole vaults over the expectations I had for what epic fantasy should be and stands in magnificent testimony to what it could be." It later appeared on The Verge's list of the best science fiction and fantasy novels of 2016, where they wrote that the book "is an incredibly ambitious and important novel" that "continues to build on its predecessor's brilliance", as well as Wired's, who believed that it was better than The Fifth Season.

Niall Alexander, on Tor.com, by contrast, was critical of The Obelisk Gate for falling into what he called "middle volume syndrome", believing that the book

sacrifices The Fifth Season's substance and sense of momentum for a far slighter and slower story. ... The Obelisk Gate is small and safe where The Fifth Season was large and surprising, practically static where said was speedy; and although it builds out the world and its workings well ... it's a shame ... that such a stunning start should be succeeded by such a sedentary, albeit completely readable sequel.

Wired, on the other hand, praised the book for escaping that syndrome, or what it called the typical "stalling" of middle books.

=== Awards ===
Year	Award	Category	Result	Ref.
2016	Nebula Award	Novel	Finalist	
2017	Hugo Award	Novel	Won	
2017	Dragon Award	Apocalyptic Novel	Nominated	
2017	Locus Award	Fantasy Novel	Finalist	
2017	World Fantasy Award	Novel	Finalist	

The Obelisk Gate's Best Novel Hugo made Jemisin the first author in over two decades to win the Best Novel Hugo in two consecutive years. She won it in 2016 with The Fifth Season, the previous novel in the Broken Earth series (The Fifth Season). Moreover, The Obelisk Gate's victory came as part of a women-heavy slate of winners at the 2017 Hugos, which included best novel, novella, novelette, and short story.
