= The Tales of Alvin Maker =

Novel series by Orson Scott Card

Book one in The Tales of Alvin Maker series, Seventh Son (1987)

The Tales of Alvin Maker is a series of seven alternate history fantasy novels written by American novelist Orson Scott Card, published from 1987 to 2026. They explore the experiences of a young man, Alvin Miller, who realizes he has incredible powers for creating and shaping things around him.

== Overview ==
The stories take place on the American frontier in the early 19th century, a fantasy setting based on early American folklore and superstition in a world in which folk magic actually works and manifests differently by race. Many Caucasian characters have a limited supernatural ability, or “knack,” to do some task nearly perfectly, Native Americans manifest nature magic, and people of African ancestry use magic similar to voodoo.

The stories involve a number of historical events and figures but are as a creation of alternate history. One source of divergence is the survival of Oliver Cromwell from the illness that killed him in reality since a physician secretly has a magical healing knack (Cromwell considered such knacks evil witchcraft). The Colonial United States is divided in the books into a number of separate nations, including a smaller United States, whose capital is Philadelphia and largest city is a Dutch-settled but increasingly English-speaking New Amsterdam. The series displays much stronger Native American influence in its culture and society between New England and Virginia that extends westwards to Ohio. (New England is a colony of a Republican England in which the English Restoration never occurred thanks to Cromwell's survival.) A monarchy on the southern portion of the Eastern Seaboard (the real-world Carolinas, Georgia, etc.), known as the "Crown Colonies", was founded by the House of Stuart in exile. An autonomous region, known as "Apalachee", is centered on the Appalachian Mountains. Canada remains controlled by France, and Florida and Nueva Barcelona (the real-world Louisiana) are colonized by Spain. The real-world Mexico is an indigenous empire but faces the prospect of war from the United States and from European powers.

Some historical figures are also accorded knacks, such as Napoleon, who has the abilities to make others adore and obey him and to see others' great ambitions.

Famous Native American figures include Tecumseh, who is called "Ta Kumsaw" in the books, and his brother Tensquatawa is also featured, as "Tenskwa Tawa". The characters in the book display features that are similar to those of both real-life famous Native Americans. The famous Battle of Tippecanoe in which both brothers were involved occurs in the second book, Red Prophet, but its outcome is different from the historic one.

== Works ==
=== Books ===
- Seventh Son (1987) - Locus Award winner, 1988; Hugo and World Fantasy Awards nominee, 1988
- Red Prophet (1988) - Nebula Award nominee, 1988; Locus Award winner, 1989; Hugo Award nominee, 1989
- Prentice Alvin (1989) - Nebula Award nominee, 1989; Locus Award winner, 1990; Hugo Award nominee, 1990
- Alvin Journeyman (1995) - Locus Award winner, 1996
- Heartfire (1998) - Locus Award nominee, 1999
- The Crystal City (2003)
- Master Alvin (April 28, 2026)

=== Short works ===
- "Hatrack River" - novelette, published in Asimovs Magazine (Aug, 1986): first five chapters of Seventh Son
- "Prentice Alvin and the No-Good Plow" - poem, published in Maps in a Mirror (1990)
- "Grinning Man" - short story, published in Legends (1998)
- "The Yazoo Queen" - short story, published in Legends II (2003)
- "Alvin and the Apple Tree" - short story, published in Dead Man's Hand (2014)
- "Naysayers" - short story, published in National Review (November 19, 2015 issue)

=== Other works ===
- Red Prophet: The Tales Of Alvin Maker - a comic book series
- Alvin Maker Game - a MMORPG - that was in development in 2005, but never published

== Characters ==
=== Alvin Miller ===
Alvin Miller, the seventh son of a seventh son, discovers that his knack far surpasses that of everyone else. He can change both living and nonliving matter simply by force of will and so has the title "Maker". This power comes at a cost, however, since Alvin feels a great responsibility to use his power for good, and there are also forces that actively seek his death.

Alvin must discover how to use his abilities, apply them for good, and struggle to survive. Along the way, he is helped by a number of people who have knacks that are not as strong, but they see in Alvin a way to use their wisdom and abilities to contribute to a greater good. Some people try to misguide him or exploit his abilities for their own purposes.

Alvin Miller is Card's reimagining of Joseph Smith, founder of the Latter Day Saint movement.

=== Alternate history characters ===
- William Blake (as the major character Taleswapper)
- William Henry Harrison
- Andrew Jackson
- Napoleon Bonaparte
- Marquis de La Fayette
- Daniel Webster
- Denmark Vesey
- John Adams
- Abraham Lincoln
- Honoré de Balzac
- John James Audubon
- Ralph Waldo Emerson
- Tecumseh (as Ta Kumsaw)
- Tensquatawa (as Lolla-Wossiky/Tenskwa Tawa)
- Stephen F. Austin
- James Bowie

=== Mentioned characters ===
These are characters who are mentioned but do not appear.

- Oliver Cromwell: His survival from the illness that killed him in reality because his physician, unknown to Cromwell, had a magical “knack” for healing and so the monarchy was not restored, which drastically altered the subsequent history of both Great Britain and British North America. That is the key divergence point of this alternative history.
- Benjamin Franklin: He is described as a "wizard" and also as a possible "maker" himself (he appears briefly in Seventh Son as "Old Ben").
- George Washington: He is described as "Lord Potomac", who served under the British crown but surrendered his army and was subsequently beheaded for treason in the series's alternate version of the American Revolution.
- Thomas Jefferson: He serves as the first President of the United States in this timeline.
- John Quincy Adams: He serves as Governor of Massachusetts during the events of Heartfire.

=== The Unmaker ===
The Unmaker is a supernatural force that breaks apart matter and aims to destroy and consume everything and everyone. Essentially, the Unmaker is entropy as a conscious and destructive entity. Aside from opposing all life, the Unmaker is the particular nemesis of Alvin Miller, who is a Maker of exceptional power and prodigious creativity and enriches life by constructing both objects and social bridges. That threatens and thwarts the Unmaker, which repeatedly attempts to do away with Alvin, at first by inducing accidents at Alvin's childhood, especially by drowning since eroding water has a natural affinity to it, and later by influencing people to challenge and repudiate him.

To make something is to oppose the Unmaker, but a point often made is that is futile. By natural law, the Unmaker can tear down faster than any man can build. On the other hand, making cares nothing about natural law. As Taleswapper reveals to a seven-year-old Alvin, the creation of what is known as the Crystal City could defeat and even destroy the Unmaker. That becomes Alvin's mission in life.

The Unmaker is usually undetectable to most people, but Alvin can detect its attention as a shimmering around his field of vision. It manifests when it needs to tempt people into war and destruction and then takes the most effective shape. A priest would see an avenging angel, a slave-owner would see a great overseer, etc. It does not appear to those who destroy willingly since they serve its cause already.

== Themes ==
=== Mormonism ===
Alvin has some characteristics similar to Joseph Smith, the founder of the Church of Jesus Christ of Latter-day Saints. Card is a member of this denomination, which is known informally as Mormons. Some of the events in Seventh Son are similar to stories about Smith's childhood. Alvin has visions of creating a Crystal City, which is similar to the church settlement of Nauvoo, Illinois. Alvin has had premonitions that he may die after building the Crystal City, which suggests Smith's death in Carthage, Illinois. Alvin was also the name of Smith's eldest brother.

=== Race ===
Race also plays a large part in the stories, particularly in how culture shapes the abilities that people of different groups develop. "Whites" have knacks or cultivated skills that appear to be derived from the folklore and traditions of Colonial America and Western Europe. "Reds" align themselves with the rhythms of nature but also use blood to perform some of their magic. "Blacks" channel their skills into creating objects of power like in the practices of voodoo.

=== Conflict ===
A recurring theme of the books is the conflict between creators and destroyers. Alvin is a Maker and confronts the Unmaker.

== See also ==
- List of works by Orson Scott Card
