= Zeroboxer =

2015 young adult science fiction novel

- Cover of the 2015 Flux edition
- Author: Fonda Lee
- Language: English
- Publication date: 2015

Zeroboxer is the 2015 debut science fiction novel by Canadian-American author Fonda Lee. The novel follows a young athlete competing in a intergalactic championship

In 2017, it was nominated for a Nebula Award for Best Novel.
