= Fonda Lee =

Canadian-American author (born 1979)

- Lee in 2026
- Born: March 10, 1979 (age 47); Calgary, Alberta, Canada
- Education: Stanford University (MBA)
- Occupation: Author
- Writing career
- Genre: Speculative fiction
- Notable work: The Green Bone Saga
- Website: fondalee.com

Fonda Lee (born March 10, 1979) is a Canadian-American author of speculative fiction. She is best known for writing The Green Bone Saga, the first of which, Jade City, won the 2018 World Fantasy Award and was named one of the 100 Best Fantasy Books of All Time by Time magazine. The Green Bone Saga was also included on NPR's list, "50 Favorite Sci-Fi and Fantasy Books of the Past Decade".

== Biography ==
Lee was born and raised in Calgary, Alberta, Canada, and resided in Portland, Oregon, and currently resides in the Boston area of the United States. She attended Stanford University where she earned her MBA. Before becoming a full-time writer, she worked as a corporate strategist. Lee is a martial artist and has earned black belts in karate and kung fu.

== Career ==
Lee's debut young adult science fiction novel, Zeroboxer, was published by Flux Books and nominated for the 2015 Andre Norton Award. It received positive reviews from Publishers Weekly and Kirkus Reviews, which described it as "top-notch science fiction and a great sports novel too".

Lee's 2017 short story "Old Souls", was published in Where the Stars Rise: Asian Science Fiction & Fantasy, and was nominated for the 2018 Aurora Award for Best Short Fiction and the 2018 World Fantasy Award for Best Short Fiction. Lee's career continued as she published the Exo duology for young adults in 2017 and 2018; both novels were well-received critically.

Her debut novel for adults, Jade City, was the first in The Green Bone Saga. It was published by Orbit Books in 2017 to critical acclaim. Jade City won the 2018 World Fantasy Award and Aurora Award for Best Novel, and was a finalist for the 2017 Nebula Award for Best Novel and 2018 Locus Award for Best Fantasy Novel. Jade City was included on Time magazine's list "The Best Fantasy Books of All Time". The second in the series, Jade War, published in 2019, was a finalist for the Locus Award, Dragon Award, Aurora Award, and Ignyte Award. The third volume of the series, Jade Legacy, was published in 2021 and also received acclaim, becoming a finalist for the 2022 Locus Award for Best Fantasy Novel, the 2022 Aurora Award for Best Novel, and a nomination for the Dragon Award for Best Novel. The Green Bone Saga as a whole was a finalist for the 2022 Hugo Award for Best Series and was included on NPR's list, "50 Favorite Sci-Fi and Fantasy Books of the Past Decade". In 2022, Subterranean Press published Lee's standalone novella set prior to the events of The Green Bone Saga entitled The Jade Setter of Janloon.

In 2020, it was announced that a television series based on Jade City was being developed at Peacock, with Lee serving as a consulting producer. In July 2022, it was announced that Peacock had canceled the project, but Lee shared on Twitter that the team were seeking another service to take it up.

Lee's fantasy novella Untethered Sky was published by Tor.com in April 2023.

In December 2022, Lee announced that she was collaborating with Shannon Lee (no relation), the daughter of the late actor and martial artist Bruce Lee, on a series of young adult fantasy novels inspired by Bruce Lee's writings. The first book, Breath of the Dragon, was published in January 2025 by Wednesday Books.

Orbit Books published Fonda Lee's "cyberpunk samurai space opera" novel The Last Contract of Isako in May 2026.

== Awards ==
Year	Work	Award	Category	Result	Ref
2015	Zeroboxer	Andre Norton Award	—	Finalist	
2017	Exo	Andre Norton Award	—	Finalist	
2017	Jade City	Nebula Award	Novel	Finalist	
2018	Exo	Aurora Award	YA Novel	Won	
2018	Jade City	Aurora Award	Novel	Won	
2018	Jade City	Locus Award	Fantasy Novel	Finalist	
2018	Jade City	World Fantasy Award	Novel	Won	
2018	“Old Souls”	Aurora Award	Short Fiction	Finalist	
2018	“Old Souls”	World Fantasy Awards	Short Fiction	Finalist	
2019	Cross Fire	Aurora Award	YA Novel	Won	
2019	Cross Fire	Locus Award	Young Adult Book	Finalist	
2020	"I (28M) Created a Deepfake Girlfriend"	Locus Award	Short Story	Finalist	
2020	Jade War	Aurora Award	Novel	Finalist	
2020	Jade War	Dragon Awards	Fantasy Novel	Nominated	
2020	Jade War	Ignyte Awards	Novel – Adult	Finalist	
2020	Jade War	Locus Award	Fantasy Novel	Finalist	
2022	Jade Legacy	Aurora Award	Novel	Won	
2022	Jade Legacy	Dragon Awards	Fantasy Novel	Nominated	
2022	Jade Legacy	Locus Award	Fantasy Novel	Won	
2022	The Green Bone Saga	Hugo Award	Series	Finalist	
2023	Untethered Sky	Nebula Award	Novella	Nominated	
2024	Untethered Sky	Aurora Award	Novelette/Novella	Won	
2024	Untethered Sky	British Fantasy Award	Novella	Shortlisted	
2026	Breath of the Dragon (Note: With Shannon Lee)	Aurora Award	Aurora Award for Best YA Novel	Won	

== Bibliography ==
=== Standalone Works ===
- Zeroboxer. Flux Books. 2015. ISBN 9780738743387.
- Untethered Sky. Tordotcom. 2023. ISBN 9781250842466.
- The Last Contract of Isako. Orbit. 2026. ISBN 9780316568630.

=== Exo Series ===
- Exo. Scholastic. 2017. ISBN 9780545933438.
- Cross Fire. Scholastic. 2018. ISBN 9781338139099.

=== The Green Bone Saga ===
Prequels

1. The Jade Setter of Janloon (Subterranean Press, 2022) – standalone prequel novella
2. Jade Shards (Subterranean Press, 2023) – collection of 4 prequel short stories

Main series

1. Jade City (Orbit Books, 2017)
2. Jade War (Orbit Books, 2019)
3. Jade Legacy (Orbit Books, 2021)

=== Breathmarked series ===
- Breath of the Dragon. Wednesday Books. January 2026. ISBN 978-1-250-90267-2
- Mark of the Warrior. Wednesday Books. October 2026. ISBN 978-1-250-90270-2.

=== Short fiction ===
- "Universal Print", first published in Crossed Genres, issue #26 (2015)
- "Spectral", first published in Perihelion (2016)
- "Old Souls", first published in Where the Stars Rise: Asian Science Fiction & Fantasy (2017)
- "Welcome to the Legion of Six", first published in The Overcast, issue #102 (2019)
- "I (28M) Created a Deepfake Girlfriend and Now My Parents Think We're Getting Married", first published in MIT Technology Review (2020).
- "The Eternal Cocktail Party of the Damned", first published in Uncanny Magazine, issue #46 (2022)

== See also ==
- List of fantasy authors
