= The Stone Sky =

Novel by N. K. Jemisin

- First edition
- Author: N. K. Jemisin
- Language: English
- Series: The Broken Earth trilogy
- Genre: Science fantasy
- Publisher: Orbit
- Publication date: August 15, 2017
- Publication place: United States
- Media type: Print, e-book, audiobook
- Pages: 464
- ISBN: 978-0-316-22924-1
- OCLC: 995310843
- Preceded by: The Obelisk Gate

The Stone Sky is a 2017 science fantasy novel by American writer N. K. Jemisin. It was awarded the Hugo Award for Best Novel, the Nebula Award for Best Novel, and the Locus Award for Best Fantasy Novel in 2018. Reviews of the book upon its release were highly positive. It is the third volume in the Broken Earth series, following The Fifth Season and The Obelisk Gate, both of which also won the Hugo Award.

== Setting ==
As with the other books in the Broken Earth series, The Stone Sky is mostly set in a single supercontinent referred to as the Stillness by its inhabitants. Most of humanity lives in city-states referred to as "comms," and are segregated into social castes based on their usefulness to society.

The Stillness is constantly wracked by geological cataclysms, and every few hundred years an event is severe enough to touch off a global volcanic winter, referred to as a Fifth Season. Some characters, referred to as orogenes, have the ability to manipulate geological energies on a large scale, as well as magic on a smaller scale. They are a persecuted and feared minority, though it is largely due to their efforts humanity has survived the Seasons at all.

== Plot ==
The former inhabitants of Castrima-under move north after damage by rival comm Rennanis compromised the geode's mechanisms, rendering it uninhabitable. The comatose Essun, nursed back to health, finds she has only a short time to return the Moon to a normal orbit and end the Fifth Seasons forever.

Essun's daughter Nassun is recovering from the shock of killing her father. Despondent and angry, she resolves to destroy both the Moon and Earth. Schaffa, her Guardian, agrees to help her reach the only city on the other side of the planet, Corepoint; from there, the Obelisk Gate can be activated without the need for the central control obelisk that Essun used.

The comm reaches Rennanis after a costly desert crossing, where Essun learns that Nassun plans to open the Gate as Essun did, which would almost certainly kill her. She takes a small company to Corepoint to intercept Nassun. Just prior to leaving, she learns she is pregnant by Lerna, the former healer from her old comm Tirimo, with whom she has started a relationship. Hoa, the stone eater who has been following her since she left Tirimo, transports them directly through the Earth; however, a rival faction of stone eaters attacks and Lerna is killed.

Nassun and Schaffa reach the ruins of a city in the Antarctic region from which Schaffa believes transportation is available to Corepoint. The ruins contain a functional transportation system linking to Corepoint directly through the center of the planet. During their transit through the core, Nassun realizes the Earth is a living consciousness furious with humanity's attempts to control it and with the loss of Earth's moon, which Earth blames humanity for. The core is rich with the magical energy that forms the Earth's consciousness, and Nassun realizes this directly fuels the Guardians' abilities and longevity through an iron shard embedded in their brains.

Flashbacks reveal Hoa's story: at its ancient peak, human technology created the Obelisk Gate, a network of nodes that tapped Earth's magical essence for an inexhaustible energy source. To accomplish this, scientists used the DNA of a subjugated race to create "tuners," humans with exquisite sensitivity to magic, to control the Gate by tapping the magic from Earth's core. However, the night before the Gate was to be activated, tuners discovered that the people their genetic code was based on were in continual torment, lobotomized and used as batteries to charge the obelisks with magical energy. The lead tuner, Hoa, decided to destroy the city of Syl Anagist using the Gate's energies rather than perpetuate this injustice. As the tuners attempted this, the Earth took control of the obelisks, trying to sterilize itself of almost all life. The tuners managed to avert this by preventing some of the obelisks from activating, but the massive energies involved flung the moon into a high elliptical orbit and tuners transformed into the first stone eaters. Nevertheless, enough obelisks were activated to cause worldwide devastation and cause "The Shattering," humanity's dark age wracked by the Fifth Seasons. From a distance, Hoa observed a single tuner survive and become the progenitor of the Orogenes.

In the present day, the Earth tries to prevent Nassun from using the Moon to destroy it by removing its iron shard from Schaffa's brain, and with that, his longevity. Distraught, Nassun decides to save Schaffa's life by using the Gate, through the central control obelisk, to transform everyone on Earth into undying stone eaters. Essun arrives and attempts to stop this and return the Moon to orbit and end the Seasons, saving Nassun from certain death. Neither can gain control. Essun releases control of the Gate, allowing her daughter to complete her task rather than risk Nassun's destruction. She is turned to stone. Nassun, moved by the sight, decides to complete her mother's task and return the Moon to orbit.

The Fifth Seasons end and civilization starts to rebuild. Deep in a cave Hoa awaits Essun's rebirth as a stone eater. Essun emerges from a geode, expressing her familiar wish to make the world better. They set off together to do so, implying that Hoa has narrated the entire trilogy to Essun to connect her to her previous life and self.

== Narration ==
The Broken Earth series uses several different styles of narration. The most widely remarked upon is its use of second person. It is eventually revealed that the books' narrator is Hoa. In The Stone Sky, Hoa narrates portions of the book set in the past in first person, and portions set in the present in second person (for Essun's perspective) and third person (for Nassun's and Syenite's perspective). Jemisin has stated that she isn't sure what prompted her to try writing Essun's chapters from a second person point-of-view, but that she ultimately chose to keep writing in second person because it conveyed "disassociation of [Essun], the not-all-here of her".

== Reception ==
The Stone Sky's release was anticipated on several "best of" upcoming science fiction and fantasy lists, including The Washington Post and io9, and reception upon its release was laudatory, winning Jemisin a third consecutive Hugo Award for Best Novel.

In starred reviews, Publishers Weekly summed up the novel as having "vivid characters, a tautly constructed plot, and outstanding worldbuilding" that came together in "an impressive and timely story of abused, grieving survivors fighting to fix themselves and save the remnants of their shattered home", and Kirkus Reviews noting that "Jemisin continues to break the heart with her sensitive, cleareyed depictions of a beyond-dysfunctional family and the extraordinarily destructive force that is prejudice." RT Book Reviews gave the book five stars, higher than the first two books in the series. Library Journal did not give The Stone Sky a star, but called it a "powerful conclusion" with a "fully developed world, detailed settings, and complex characters".

NPR's reviewer Amal El-Mohtar praised the novel's twist on traditional fantasy and science-fiction, which usually posits that a world is worth saving. "The Stone Sky rejects this out of hand", El-Mohtar writes. "If the Broken Earth trilogy as a whole shows a world where cataclysm and upheaval is the norm, The Stone Sky interrogates what right worlds built on oppression and genocide have to exist." Tor.com's Niall Alexander, who was critical of The Obelisk Gate, declared that The Stone Sky was a "comprehensive confirmation of N. K. Jemisin as one of our very finest fantasists", and that as a whole, the series is "one of the great trilogies of our time". Barnes & Noble's Joel Cunningham agreed, asserting that it "reshapes the face of epic fantasy", as did The Verge's Andrew Liptak, praising the book as "a triumphant achievement in fantasy literature". He concluded:

Every now and again there comes a work that seeks to redefine the face of genre literature, from Ursula K. Le Guin's The Left Hand of Darkness to William Gibson's Neuromancer. With the Broken Earth trilogy, Jemisin has made a place for herself among these greats, pulling off a landmark story that blends fantasy, science fiction, and post-apocalyptic tropes. Finishing The Stone Sky left me utterly breathless by the scale and scope of what Jemisin accomplished in these three books—narratively, technically, and thematically.

=== Awards ===
Year	Award	Category	Result	Ref.
2017	Nebula Award	Novel	Won	
2018	Hugo Award	Novel	Won	
2018	Locus Award	Fantasy Novel	Won	

The Stone Sky was the third of three books in the Broken Earth series to win a Best Novel Hugo. With it, Jemisin became the first person to win that award in three consecutive years.
