= Prentice Alvin =

1989 novel by Orson Scott Card

- Cover of first edition (hardcover)
- Author: Orson Scott Card
- Cover artist: Dennis Nolan
- Language: English
- Series: The Tales of Alvin Maker
- Genre: Fantasy, alternate history
- Publisher: Tor Books
- Publication date: 1989
- Publication place: United States
- Media type: Print (Hardcover & Paperback)
- Pages: 342
- Award: Locus Award for Best Fantasy Novel (1990)
- ISBN: 0-312-93141-7
- OCLC: 18624985
- Dewey Decimal: 813/.54 19
- LC Class: PS3553.A655 P74 1989
- Preceded by: Red Prophet
- Followed by: Alvin Journeyman

Prentice Alvin (1989) is an alternate history/fantasy novel by American writer Orson Scott Card. It is the third book in Card's The Tales of Alvin Maker series and is about Alvin Miller, the seventh son of a seventh son. Prentice Alvin won the Locus Award for Best Fantasy Novel in 1990, was nominated for the Nebula Award for Best Novel in 1989, and the Hugo Award for Best Novel in 1990.

== Plot summary ==
After being released from his time with Ta-Kumsaw, an Indian leader who taught Alvin the ways of the Indian people, the young boy sets out to start his apprenticeship as a Smith in the town in which he was born.

There, he meets a young half-black boy by the name of Arthur Stuart, the son of a slave and a slaveowner who has been adopted by the owners of the local guesthouse.

Another new friend comes in the form of Miss Margaret Larner, who he later discovers is the "torch" who had helped him to be born so many years ago, and he has been strangely linked to her since that day.

Eventually, Alvin is forced into helping Arthur to escape some slavehunters, which requires him to change Arthur's DNA slightly, just enough to prevent the hunters' knacks from identifying the runaway child.

Alvin also creates a plow of living gold, which is bestowed with magical properties, as his journeyman piece to release himself from his apprenticeship as a Smith (and also as a Maker).

The story ends with Alvin and Arthur leaving the town and returning to Alvin's home in the west.

== See also ==
- List of works by Orson Scott Card
