= Alvin Journeyman =

1995 novel by Orson Scott Card

- Front cover.
- Author: Orson Scott Card
- Cover artist: Dennis Nolan
- Language: English
- Series: The Tales of Alvin Maker
- Genre: Fantasy, alternate history
- Publisher: Tor Books
- Publication date: 1995
- Publication place: United States
- Media type: Print (Hardcover & Paperback)
- Pages: 381
- Award: Locus Award for Best Fantasy Novel (1996)
- ISBN: 0-312-85053-0
- OCLC: 32665317
- Dewey Decimal: 813/.54 20
- LC Class: PS3553.A655 A78 1995
- Preceded by: Prentice Alvin
- Followed by: Heartfire

Alvin Journeyman (1995) is an alternate history/fantasy novel by American writer Orson Scott Card. It is the fourth book in Card's The Tales of Alvin Maker series and is about Alvin Miller, the seventh son of a seventh son. Alvin Journeyman won the Locus Award for Best Fantasy Novel in 1996.

== Plot summary ==
Alvin is a Maker, and he can make a new future for America. However, to do that he must defeat his ancient enemy, the Unmaker, whose cruel whispers and deadly plots have threatened Alvin's life at every turn.

Now a grown man and a journeyman smith, Alvin has returned to his family and friends in the town of Vigor Church to share in their isolation, to work as a blacksmith, and to try to teach anyone who will learn the knack of being a Maker. Alvin has had a vision of the city he will build, and he knows that he cannot build it alone.

However, the Unmaker is not through with Alvin. If that spirit of destruction cannot stop him by magic or by war and devastation, it will try to crush the young Maker by simpler means: more human means. By lies and innuendo and by false accusations, Alvin is driven from his home back to Hatrack River, only to find that the Unmaker has been there before him and that he must now stand trial for his life. Against him in the trial is Daniel Webster.

Meanwhile, Alvin's brother Calvin has started to grow into his own knacks, which he views to be equal to Alvin's. When Alvin returned to Vigor Church; he found that Calvin had been doing all of the jobs that Alvin had done prior to his apprenticeship. When Alvin started to teach how to be a Maker, Calvin resented how he felt he was being treated and decided to learn how to be a Maker on his own but by any means that he deems necessary. He finds passage to the United Kingdom and then to the courtship of Emperor Napoleon, who is in Paris, to treat him for his gout. By healing Napoleon's pain each day, Calvin spends a few hours a day learning on how to rule. Calvin makes a friend in Paris; leaves with him to Américain; and leaves Napoleon, who is healed from ever feeling pain again.

== Intertextuality ==
The song that Alvin makes up during his stay in the Hatrack River jail contains a reference to Tolkien's The Lord of the Rings trilogy.

== See also ==
- List of works by Orson Scott Card
