= The Jade Setter of Janloon =

2022 novella by Fonda Lee

- Author: Fonda Lee
- Language: English
- Series: Green Bone Saga
- Release number: 4 (publication order)
- Genre: Fantasy
- Set in: Janloon, Kekon
- Publisher: Subterranean Press
- Publication date: 31 May 2022
- Publication place: United States
- Pages: 144
- ISBN: 978-1-64524-062-4
- Followed by: Jade City

The Jade Setter of Janloon is a 2022 novella by Fonda Lee, set in the same world as her Green Bone Saga novels. The novella serves as a prequel to that series.

== Plot ==
Pulo Oritono is an apprentice jade setter in Janloon. His master Isin is affiliated with neither the Mountain nor No Peak clans, and works for both sides equally. Ayt Madashi, Pillar of the Mountain Clan, entrusts her moon blade to the shop for repairs. The blade is stolen. Despite her innocence, an employee named Malla is arrested for the theft by Detective Tan.

Pulo believes that Isin's nephew Nuo is the real culprit. He confronts Nuo, who admits to the theft and has begun to suffer from the itches. (This is a fatal disease caused by over-exposure to jade). Nuo attacks Pulo, who kills him. Pulo finds a note from Isin that leaves the shop to him; Isin has disappeared.

Pulo goes to No Peak for help. At the Kaul estate, he meets Washo Kunimun, a wealthy businessman. Washo had previously offered to buy Isin's shop, but was rejected. Pulo meets Kaul Hilo, who is able to locate a few smaller pieces of stolen jade. Nevertheless, the moon blade remains missing.

From jail, Malla reveals that Washo had blackmailed Nuo into stealing the moon blade. Malla was a sex trafficking victim who had escaped Washo with Isin's help. Detective Tan and Pulo go to Washo's residence. As they arrive, they see Washo's corpse fall from an upper-story window, with Isin holding the bloody moon blade.

Isin surrenders and is sentenced to death. Kaul Lan of the No Peak clan pardons him, and Isin is exiled instead. Ayt Mada's moon blade is returned. Pulo and Malla take over the jade shop and run it together.

== Reception ==
Nadia Elbaar of Locus wrote that the novella "is about people on the periphery of jade, the people outside Green Bone affairs but no less directed by their outcomes." Elbaar wrote that "The Jade Setter of Janloon is not a mystery story; the expectation is not that we process clues in sync with Pulo to deduce the thief’s identity. Rather, while Pulo uncovers the culprit and motive, we examine Janloon’s power structures through his eyes as his desperation takes him through the levels of Janloon’s jade-stratified society." Elbaar appreciated the contrast between the novel and the main series, in that the works showcase different attitudes toward Green Bone society and jade abilities. Publishers Weekly called the novella a "short but satisfying escapade", writing that "the emphasis on family loyalty and personal responsibility meshes well with the noir tone and examination of systematic exploitation of the indigenous Abukei, while jade-empowered feats of combat add wuxia flair."

The novella won the 2023 Aurora Award for Best Novelette/Novella.
