= Jade Legacy =

2021 fantasy novel by Fonda Lee

- First edition
- Author: Fonda Lee
- Language: English
- Series: The Green Bone Saga #3
- Genre: Fantasy
- Publisher: Orbit Books
- Publication date: November 30, 2021
- Media type: Print, ebook
- Pages: 624 pp
- Awards: Locus Award for Best Fantasy Novel; Aurora Award for Best Novel
- ISBN: 9780316440974
- Preceded by: Jade War

Jade Legacy is a 2021 fantasy novel by American Fonda Lee, published by Orbit on November 30, 2021. It is the third and final novel in The Green Bone Saga, which began with Jade City (2017), and follows the surviving players from the end of Jade War (2019) as they plot a path for peace between nations and within Janloon's competing tribes, The Mountain Clan and No Peak Clan, over jade distribution. Jade Legacy was well-received critically and won the 2022 Locus Award for Best Fantasy Novel and the 2022 Aurora Award for Best Novel.

== Plot ==
With the mass distribution of jade occurring after the events of Jade War, forces from all sides will swarm Janloon, seeking jade's magical abilities. As one worldwide crisis ends, more wars break out internationally and within Kekon, as Hilo and Shae struggle to hold their power and prepare the children of their family to take up the No Peak Clan legacy. At the same time, they wage a continued war against The Mountain clan as its power continues to grow.

== Development history ==
Jade Legacy is Lee's third adult novel. In a 2018 interview with Lightspeed, Lee said of the novel writing process: "I normally write a book a year, but the Green Bone novels are twice as long and about five times more complicated than my previous books" and that she planned on writing adult books over young adult novels; she expected "be focused on the Green Bone Saga for some time." In 2020, Lee revealed that Jade Legacy would take place over the span of 20 years.

== Literary significance and reception ==
Jade Legacy received critical acclaim ahead of its release, earning a starred review and weekly pick status from Publishers Weekly, a starred review from Library Journal, and a glowing review from NPR's book reviews.

Publishers Weekly called it "sprawling, complex, and steeped in Asian culture and sensibilities..." and said "Lee expertly balances conflict and growth on both individual and societal levels, giving this massive story weight, as every decision can potentially change the world. In both meeting and subverting expectations at every turn, Lee guides her cast to a deeply satisfying, well-earned conclusion.". Kristi Chadwick of Library Journal said "Lee's storytelling is masterful and will leave readers heartbroken and hopeful." NPR book reviewer Jason Sheehan called Jade Legacy "Thirty years of love and war and vengeance and betrayal..." and that "Ultimately, that's what Jade Legacy is about. Endings. And then what comes next.".

== Awards and nominations ==
Year	Award	Category	Result	Ref
2022	Aurora Award	Novel	Won	
2022	Dragon Awards	Best Fantasy Novel	Nominated	
2022	Locus Award	Fantasy Novel	Won	

== Adaptations ==
In August 2020, Deadline announced in an exclusive that a TV series based on the first novel in The Green Bone Saga, Jade City, was being developed at Peacock, with Lee serving as a consulting producer. By July 2022, Peacock had canceled the project, but Lee shared on Twitter that the team were seeking another service to take it up.
