= Jade City (novel) =

2017 novel by Fonda Lee

- First edition
- Author: Fonda Lee
- Language: English
- Series: Green Bone Saga
- Genre: Fantasy
- Publisher: Orbit
- Publication date: November 7, 2017
- Media type: Print, e-book
- Pages: 560
- Awards: World Fantasy Award (2018); Aurora Award for Best Novel (2018)
- ISBN: 978-0316440882
- Preceded by: The Jade Setter of Janloon
- Followed by: Jade War

Jade City is a 2017 fantasy novel by Fonda Lee. It is the first novel in the Green Bone Saga and was followed by Jade War (2019) and Jade Legacy (2021). A prequel novella, The Jade Setter of Janloon, was released in 2022; and a collection of short stories, Jade Shards, was released in 2023. The novel received critical praise, winning the 2018 World Fantasy Award for Best Novel, the 2018 Aurora Award for Best Novel, and was a finalist for the 2017 Nebula Award for Best Novel.

== Background ==
Before writing Jade City, Lee received an MBA from Stanford, worked as a business strategist and wrote science fiction novels. She has stated that she "[treats] the magic almost in a science fictional way" and as "a way to have the international trade and politics play out in the storyline."

Lee has stated that one of her goals for the novel was to "write an epic fantasy that was not set in medieval Europe," featuring "the scheming and politics and clash of noble houses elements" in a "different cultural setting but also different time period."

== Plot ==
=== Premise ===
The events of Jade City take place a generation after the end of the Many Nations War, a conflict roughly analogous to World War II, during which the One Mountain Society, a national liberation movement, successfully fought to end foreign occupation of Kekon. After the war, the One Mountain Society disintegrated into a number of rival clans, with the most powerful being the isolationist Mountain clan led by the Ayt family and the internationalist No Peak clan led by the Kaul family. The clans each have a Pillar, Horn, and Weather Man; the Pillar is the head of the clan, the Horn leads its street fighters, and the Weather Man is responsible for business activities.

Kekon contains the world's only supply of jade, a mineral that endows its wearer with enhanced abilities. Safe use of jade requires a combination of genetic predisposition and intense training in the six jade disciplines. The aboriginal population of Kekon, the Abukei, are completely immune to its effects, while individuals from outside Kekon are too sensitive to it. Only the Kekonese, with mixed aboriginal and settler ancestry, have the necessary combination of resistance and sensitivity to be able to use it long-term. Lee has commented that she tied jade ability to a combination of genetics and luck as "a way to subvert that trope of the blood talent... the chosen ones." Kekonese with no ability to use jade are called "stone-eyes" and are considered unlucky. The drug SN1, or shine, can be used to increase one's jade tolerance.

=== Jade City ===
Bero, a thief, attempts to steal jade from a No Peak Fist. He and his Abukei accomplice Sampa are quickly caught and brought to the Horn of No Peak, Kaul Hilo for punishment. Hilo takes the two boys to be questioned in the presence of his brother Lan, the clan Pillar. Hilo attempts to convince Lan that the Mountain clan is squeezing No Peak territory, but he is opposed by Doru the Weather Man, who counsels a peaceful solution. Feeling frustrated and unsupported by Doru, Lan asks his grandfather Kaul Sen for permission to replace Doru, but Kaul Sen refuses to allow it. Lan's sister Shae returns to Kekon from her studies abroad, but she declines to become involved in clan business and refuses to wear her jade.

The Mountain kidnaps Emery Anden, the adopted cousin of Kaul Lan, Hilo, and Shae. Ayt Mada offers Anden a position in her clan, signaling that she wishes to unite the Mountain and No Peak. Once Anden has been returned safely, Lan begins to move against the Mountain. He proposes a new law preventing any one clan from gaining control of the Kekon Jade Alliance, and he sends Shae to audit the KJA's accounts.

The Mountain makes an attempt on Hilo's life. Lan duels a Mountain clan member and is successful. In the aftermath, Hilo asks his brother for permission to marry his girlfriend Wen. Despite his misgivings about Hilo marrying a stone-eye from a disreputable family, Lan gives his permission.

Lan is injured in the duel, but he cannot show weakness by failing to wear the additional jade he has won. He arranges for Anden to bring him packages of shine. When Anden realizes what he is delivering, he pleads with Lan to stop using the drug. When Shae comes to see Anden, he fails to tell her about Lan's drug use.

Shae reports to Lan that someone in the KJA is skimming jade; either Doru doesn't know about it and is incompetent, or he is allowing it to happen. Lan sends Doru overseas to get him out of the way and tells his allies on the Royal Council that he is going to suspend jade production.

Meanwhile, the Mountain tells Bero to shoot up the gentleman's club that Lan frequents. Lan accidentally takes an overdose of shine while visiting the club, and when Bero attacks him he falls into the sea and drowns. When Shae hears about Lan's death, she decides to formally rejoin the clan and put on her jade. She persuades Hilo, the new Pillar, to strike back against the Mountain. Hilo appoints her as his Weather Man; Doru is arrested and placed under house arrest.

Shae and Hilo accuse Ayt Mada of skimming jade from the KJA and supplying it to foreign nations. Ayt arranges to meet Shae on safe ground and tries to talk her into betraying No Peak, but Shae refuses. Wen asks Shae to make her a spy for the clan without Hilo's knowledge. Shae sends her to a foreign military base with a shipment of jade worth millions, re-establishing the supply that has been disrupted by the KJA's suspension of jade production.

Doru defects to the Mountain. Hilo marries Wen, then has Anden drive him into Mountain territory, where he expects to be killed in combat. Together, Hilo and Anden manage to kill Gont Asch, the Horn of the Mountain. The fight leaves Anden in a coma. When he regains consciousness, he learns that the loss of its Horn has dealt the Mountain a serious blow and given No Peak a temporary advantage in the war. Anden returns to the academy for his graduation ceremony, but when he is presented with his jade he declares he does not want to be a Green Bone. He tells Hilo he does not want a life of violence, and the Pillar rebukes him publicly.

Later, under cover of darkness, Bero visits Lan's grave. He is still looking for jade, and in the former Pillar's coffin there is a generous supply.

== Reception and awards ==
Publishers Weekly called the novel "an engaging blend of crime drama and Asian martial arts film tropes." A starred review from Library Journal stated that the novel "mixes bold martial-arts action and vivid worldbuilding. The result is terrific."

A review for Kirkus described Kekon as "an analog of mid-20th-century Hong Kong" and also stated that several elements of the story lean heavily on The Godfather. The same review notes that the novel has "its own story to tell; an intriguing confluence of history, culture, and biology shapes both the characters and their fates." Writing for Tor.com, Liz Bourke stated that the novel "feels as though it mixes The Legend of Korra with Gangs of New York and a generous helping of Hong Kong action cinema". Bourke praised the detailed world-building of Kekon as well as the well-developed characters.

Year	Award	Category	Result	Ref
2017	Nebula Award	Novel	Finalist	
2018	Aurora Award	Novel	Won	
2018	Locus Award	Fantasy Novel	Finalist	
2018	World Fantasy Award	Novel	Won	

== Adaptations ==
In August 2020, it was reported that Peacock was going to develop a television series adaptation of the novel. The series was going to be produced by Universal Television with Dave Kalstein as writer and executive producer, Breck Eisner as director and executive producer and Dean Georgaris as executive producer. In June 2022, Lee announced that the series was not moving forward at the service and would be shopped again.
