= Old Souls (story) =

2017 short story by Fonda Lee

"Old Souls" is a 2017 fantasy short story by Fonda Lee about reincarnation. It was first published in the anthology Where the Stars Rise: Asian Science Fiction and Fantasy.

== Synopsis ==
Claire remembers all of her past lives. What they all have in common is that she always died before turning 21. She has just turned 20, and is desperate to break the cycle.

== Reception ==
"Old Souls" was a finalist for the 2018 World Fantasy Award—Short Fiction and the 2018 Aurora Award for Best Short Fiction.
