= Locus Award for Best Fantasy Novel =

Literary award by Locus magazine

The Locus Award for Best Fantasy Novel is a literary award given annually by Locus magazine as part of their Locus Awards.

== Winners ==
Year	Novel	Author	Ref.
1978	The Silmarillion	J. R. R. Tolkien	
1979	Not awarded		
1980	Harpist in the Wind	Patricia A. McKillip	
1981	Lord Valentine's Castle	Robert Silverberg	
1982	The Claw of the Conciliator	Gene Wolfe	
1983	The Sword of the Lictor	Gene Wolfe	
1984	The Mists of Avalon	Marion Zimmer Bradley	
1985	Job: A Comedy of Justice	Robert A. Heinlein	
1986	Trumps of Doom	Roger Zelazny	
1987	Soldier of the Mist	Gene Wolfe	
1988	Seventh Son	Orson Scott Card	
1989	Red Prophet	Orson Scott Card	
1990	Prentice Alvin	Orson Scott Card	
1991	Tehanu: The Last Book of Earthsea	Ursula K. Le Guin	
1992	Beauty	Sheri S. Tepper	
1993	Last Call	Tim Powers	
1994	The Innkeeper's Song	Peter S. Beagle	
1995	Brittle Innings	Michael Bishop	
1996	Alvin Journeyman	Orson Scott Card	
1997	A Game of Thrones	George R. R. Martin	
1998	Earthquake Weather	Tim Powers	
1999	A Clash of Kings	George R. R. Martin	
2000	Harry Potter and the Prisoner of Azkaban	J. K. Rowling	
2001	A Storm of Swords	George R. R. Martin	
2002	American Gods	Neil Gaiman	
2003	The Scar	China Miéville	
2004	Paladin of Souls	Lois McMaster Bujold	
2005	Iron Council	China Miéville	
2006	Anansi Boys	Neil Gaiman	
2007	The Privilege of the Sword	Ellen Kushner	
2008	Making Money	Terry Pratchett	
2009	Lavinia	Ursula K. Le Guin	
2010	The City & the City	China Miéville	
2011	Kraken	China Miéville	
2012	A Dance with Dragons	George R. R. Martin	
2013	The Apocalypse Codex	Charles Stross	
2014	The Ocean at the End of the Lane	Neil Gaiman	
2015	The Goblin Emperor	Katherine Addison	
2016	Uprooted	Naomi Novik	
2017	All the Birds in the Sky	Charlie Jane Anders	
2018	The Stone Sky	N. K. Jemisin	
2019	Spinning Silver	Naomi Novik	
2020	Middlegame	Seanan McGuire	
2021	The City We Became	N. K. Jemisin	
2022	Jade Legacy	Fonda Lee	
2023	Babel, or the Necessity of Violence	R. F. Kuang	
2024	Witch King	Martha Wells	
2025	A Sorceress Comes to Call	T. Kingfisher	
2026	The Everlasting	Alix E. Harrow	
