= Seventh son of a seventh son =

Folklore concept

The seventh son of a seventh son is a concept from folklore regarding special powers given to, or held by, such a son. To qualify as "the seventh son of a seventh son", one must be the seventh male child born in an unbroken line with no female siblings born between, and to a father who himself is the seventh male child born in an unbroken line with no female siblings born between. In some beliefs, the special powers are inborn, inherited simply by virtue of his birth order; in others, the powers are granted to him by God or the gods because of his birth order. In many cases, seventh sons who are not born to a seventh son are also said to have supernatural or healing abilities.

The number seven has a long history of mystical and biblical significance, such as seven virtues, seven deadly sins, Seven Sleepers and Seven Heavens. The number seven had mystical and religious significance in Mesopotamian culture by the 22nd century BCE at the latest. This was likely because in the Sumerian sexagesimal number system, dividing by seven was the first division which resulted in infinitely repeating fractions.

== Regional variations ==
=== England ===
In Lancashire and particularly in Blackburn there was, in the eighteenth and nineteenth centuries, a tradition of calling seventh sons of seventh sons (and seventh sons) 'Doctor' (forename) because of their supposed abilities as healers.

=== Ireland ===
The seventh son of a seventh son is gifted as a healer. The seventh son of a seventh son is part of a more general phenomenon known as the "cure" (sometimes also called the "charm"). Belief in the efficacy of seventh son healers and other folklore related to healing persisted to the 20th century in parts of Ireland.

=== Italy ===
In a legend of Montenero di Bisaccia, "Ciarallo" was a seventh son who had the power to enchant and recall snakes, and who was immune to snake venom. Ciarallo was not only a seventh son, but underwent a special initiation rite called "inciaramazione". Customarily, one would ask Ciarallo's intercession when a snake was discovered in the house. Ciarallo would answer these requests by attracting the snake with a whistle. He would also perform the inciaramazione rite on other people to ensure protection from snakes by spreading a special oil on their arms. Children were led to Ciarallo by their mothers to get protection.

=== Latin America ===
In some Latin American countries, the seventh son of a seventh son is believed to be cursed to be a werewolf, lobizón, Luison (in Paraguay) or lobisomem (the Portuguese word for "werewolf"), while the seventh daughter is cursed to be a witch. To prevent this, the newborn should be baptized in seven different churches. Alternatively, he may be baptized under the name Benito, with his eldest brother (the eldest son of their father) as his godfather.

=== Argentina ===
The local myth of the lobizón is distinct, but not disconnected from the Argentinian law by which every seventh son (or seventh daughter) born in Argentina to "legitimately married parents of good conduct and moral character" is eligible to become godchild to the president. This custom, which began over 100 years ago after being brought to the country by Russian immigrants, is still on the books in Argentina, and may be the source for the wider folk beliefs around seventh sons and daughters in Latin America.

=== Romania ===
Raymond T. McNally and Radu Florescu describe the Transylvanian folk belief that "the seventh son of a seventh son is doomed to become a vampire."

=== United States ===
According to Edward Augustus Kendall in Travels through the Northern Parts of the United States, in the year 1807–1808, while he visited the Newgate copper mine and prison, he met an innkeeper who told him that "there was to be found in the surrounding hills, a black stone, of a certain species, through which a seventh son of a seventh son, born in the month of February, with a caul on his head, can discern everything that lies in the depths and interior of the globe." The author speculated that the importance of mining to the community gave rise to the localized belief.

== Modern cultural interpretations ==
In recent years, the legend of the seventh son of a seventh son has continued to attract cultural interest, with articles noting its persistence in Irish healing folklore into the late 20th century and its influence in fiction and music, such as Iron Maiden's Seventh Son of a Seventh Son concept album and Willie Dixon's blues song "The Seventh Son".

The title character of the Septimus Heap children's fantasy novel series is the seventh son of a seventh son, which gives him extraordinary magical powers.

The DC Comics hero Johnny Thunder is the seventh son of a seventh son, which accounts for his mystical connection to the Thunderbolt genie.

== Alleged real-life examples ==
- James Murrell (1785?–1860) was the seventh son of a seventh son, according to investigations by Arthur Morrison.
- Abram George (1916?–?), Mohawk faith healer from Akwesasne, claimed in contemporary news reports to have been the seventh son of a seventh son.
- Archille Noé Baillargeon (1889–?) from Tecumseh, Ontario was the seventh son of a seventh son and was believed to have extraordinary healing powers.
- Although singer Perry Como (1912–2001) claimed to be a seventh son, he had two older sisters and only one older brother who survived to adulthood plus three preceding siblings who died in infancy.
- Myer Lord lived in Northern Harbour, Deer Island, New Brunswick and claimed to be a faith healer by right of being the seventh son of a seventh son.
- Although Pro American Football Hall of Famer Len Dawson (1935–2022) has been described as the seventh son of a seventh son, he had two older sisters.
- Ivor Powell (1916–2012), Welsh football player and manager, said that "people used to keep pointing it out, but it didn't mean a lot to me"
- Although musician Jack White is a seventh son, he has two older sisters. It’s unknown whether his father, Gorman Gillis (1927–2006), was a seventh son. White nonetheless seems to identify with the myth and sings about it in the song "Ball and Biscuit" by The White Stripes.

== See also ==
- List of occult terms
