= List of Ender's Game series short stories =

There are various sources for short stories set in the Ender's Game series. One is the short story collection First Meetings by Orson Scott Card. This collection contains the original novelette Ender's Game plus three other stories. Another source is Card’s webzine InterGalactic Medicine Show. The first four stories from Card's webzine: "Mazer in Prison," "Pretty Boy," "Cheater," and "A Young Man with Prospects," also appear in the paperback anthology Orson Scott Card's InterGalactic Medicine Show. Reprints of short stories in the Ender's Game series can be found in other science fiction anthologies.

== Analog Science Fiction and Fact ==
- "Ender's Game"

This story is the original Ender's Game novelette which Card published in the August 1977 issue of Analog Science Fiction and Fact.

- "Gloriously Bright"

This story introduces the characters of Han Fei-tzu, Han Qing-jao, and Si Wang-mu and was published in the January 1991 issue of Analog Science Fiction and Fact.

== First Meetings ==
- "Investment Counselor"

This is the story of how Ender Wiggin first meets the AI Jane and decides to become a speaker for the dead.

- "The Polish Boy"

This is the story of how John Paul Wiggin (Ender's father) comes to the attention of the International Fleet as a child.

- "Teacher's Pest"

This is the story of how John Paul Wiggin first meets and falls in love with his future wife Theresa Brown.

== InterGalactic Medicine Show ==
- "Mazer in Prison"

This story centers around Mazer Rackham, a young Hyrum Graff, and the creation of Battle School.

- "Pretty Boy"

This is the story of Bonito "Bonzo" Madrid as a child, and his decision to go to Battle School. First published in the March 2006 issue of InterGalactic Medicine Show, the story also appears in the anthology Orson Scott Card's InterGalactic Medicine Show.

- "Cheater"

This story tells how Han Tzu (Hot Soup) ends up getting selected to go to Battle School.

- "A Young Man with Prospects"

This story tells how Alessandra and her mother become colonists on a new planet after the Formic War.

- "The Gold Bug"

This story tells the story of how a former soldier steps aside to allow Ender to become the governor of his planet.

- "Ender's Stocking"

This story is about Peter Wiggin and his family at Christmas time, while Ender is still in Battle School.

- "Ender's Homecoming"

This story is about how Ender's parents and sister conspire to keep him from returning to Earth so he will be safe.

- "Ender in Flight"

This story is about a power struggle between Ender and Admiral Morgan on the way to the colony where Ender is to become governor.

== Other ==
- "The War of Gifts"

In 2016, Card released this version of the story A War of Gifts: An Ender Story, which excludes the "Ender's Stocking" chapter, for inclusion in the anthology Decision Points.

- "Renegat"

Originally posted to Orson Scott Card's Uncle Orson on the Fly subscribers' area on February 2, 2017, this short story was first published in the space opera anthology, Infinite Stars, on October 17, 2017. The story is told from Dabeet Ochoa's point of view as he, Ender, and Valentine work to solve a murder mystery on the planet Catalunya.

- "Governor Wiggin"

Originally posted to Orson Scott Card's Uncle Orson on the Fly subscribers' area on June 10, 2017, this short story has been published in Ender's Way, a large collection of Ender-related short stories, on April 12, 2021. The story is about Ender solving problems in his colony during his time as governor.

- "Messenger"

Originally posted to Orson Scott Card's Uncle Orson on the Fly subscribers' area on September 10, 2018, this short story will first be published in the space opera anthology, Infinite Stars: Dark Frontiers, scheduled for release on November 5, 2019. This story focuses on Hyrum Graff, and may be the first few chapters of The Last Shadow.

== Chronological order of stories ==
- "Mazer in Prison"
- "The Polish Boy"
- "Teacher's Pest"
- "Pretty Boy"
- "Cheater"
- "The War of Gifts"
- "Ender's Stocking"
- "Ender's Game"
- "Ender's Homecoming"
- "A Young Man with Prospects"
- "Ender in Flight"
- "The Gold Bug"
- "Governor Wiggin"
- "Investment Counselor"
- "Renegat"
- "Gloriously Bright"
- "Messenger"

=== Chronology chart ===
Chronological chart of Enderverse stories

Short Stories	Novels	Comics	Audioplay	Film

First Meetings (in the Enderverse) (2002 (2003)) Ender's Game Investment Counselor The Polish Boy Teacher's Pest
OSCs InterGalactic; Medicine Show (2008) Mazer in Prison Cheater Pretty Boy A Young Man with Prospects
Cheater (2006)
Ender's Shadow (1999) (Note: The events of Ender's Game, Ender's Shadow and A War of Gifts take place in roughly the same time period. The events of A War of Gifts only take place during the time at Battle School).) Ender's Shadow: Battle School (2009) Command School (2010) Ultimate collection (2012)
The Shadow Trilogy (Note: The events of Ender in Exile and the Shadow Trilogy take place in roughly the same time period.: First part of Ender in Exile (2/3) takes place during the Shadow Trilogy.; Last part of Ender in Exile (1/3) takes places after Shadow of the Giant.) (Note: Note on the following (maybe not yet so common) Trilogies: "Speaker Trilogy": Original set of sequels to Ender's Game, also referred to as: "Ender Quartet" (Ender's Game combined with "Speaker Trilogy"), also referred to as: "Ender Quintet" ("Ender Quartet" combined with Ender in Exile).; "Shadow Trilogy": Original set of sequels to Ender's Shadow, also referred to as: "Bean Quartet"/"Shadow Quartet" (Ender's Shadow combined with "Shadow Trilogy"), also referred to as: "Bean Quintet"/"Shadow Quintet" ("Bean Quartet" combined with Shadows in Flight), could be referred to as: "Bean Sextet"/"Shadow Sextet" ("Bean Quintet" combined with The Last Shadow)) Shadow of the Hegemon (2001) Shadow Puppets (2002) Shadow of the Giant (2005)
Shadows in Flight (2012)
Messenger (2018)
The Last Shadow (2021)

Formic Wars: Burning Earth (2011) Formic Wars: Silent Strike (2012)	First Formic; War Trilogy Earth Unaware (2012) Earth Afire (2013) Earth Awakens (2014)
Second Formic; War Trilogy The Swarm (2016) The Hive (2019) The Queens (TBA)
Mazer in Prison (2005)	Mazer in Prison (2010)
Pretty Boy (2006)
Ender's Game; Alive (2013) Recruiting Valentine (2009) The League War (2010)	Ender's Game (1977) Ender's Game (1985) Ender's Game: Battle School (2009) Command School (2010) Ultimate collection (2012) Ender's Game (2013)
Ender's Homecoming (2008) A Young Man with Prospects (2007) Ender in Flight (2008) The Gold Bug (2007)	Ender in Exile (2008) Ender in Exile (2011) Gold Bug (2010)
Governor Wiggin (2017)
Investment Counselor (1999)
Speaker for the Dead (2011) Gloriously Bright (1991)	The Speaker Trilogy Speaker for the Dead (1986) Xenocide (1991) Children of the Mind (1996)

War of Gifts (2010) Mazer in Prison Recruiting Valentine The League War War of Gifts
The Polish Boy (2002)
Teacher's Pest (2003)
Ender's Stocking (2007) A War of Gifts (2007) War of Gifts (2009)
Fleet School (Note: Title is also mentioned in regard to a possible sequel for the film.) Children of the Fleet (2017)... (TBC)
Renegat (2017)

== See also ==
- List of Ender's Game characters
- List of works by Orson Scott Card
- First Meetings by Orson Scott Card
- InterGalactic Medicine Show: Card's webzine
