= Ender's Game (comics) =

Comic adaptation of science fiction book

Publication information
- Publisher: Marvel Comics
- Schedule: Monthly
- Format: Ongoing series
- Publication date: October 2008
- No. of issues: 47 (as of April 2012)

Creative team
- Created by: Orson Scott Card
- Written by: Christopher Yost, Mike Carey, Jake Blac, Aaron Johnston
- Artist(s): Pasqual Ferry, Sebastian Fiumara, Timothy Green, Pasqual Ferry, Pop Mahn

Ender's Game is a series of comic book adaptations of a series of science fiction novels of the same name written by Orson Scott Card and published by Marvel Comics that began in October 2008. However, some have new content not included in the novels. The series, like the novels they are based on, are set in a future where mankind is facing annihilation by an aggressive alien society, an insect-like race known colloquially as "Buggers" but more formally as "Formics". The central character, Andrew "Ender" Wiggin, is one of the child soldiers trained at Battle School (and eventually Command School) to be the future leaders of the protection of Earth. The year is never specified, although the ages of the Wiggin children are bound to change throughout space, taking in the relativity of space and time.

== Background ==
=== Format ===
The series of comic books are adaptations of the novels in the Ender Saga are released under the banner "Actual Ender's Game". The series began publication in October 2008 with the first issue of Ender's Game: Battle School, with a set monthly release that followed. Both Ender's Game and Ender's Shadow stories were told spanning ten issues each, with two different sub-titles. Orson Scott Card's name has been attached to every issue released. Though he himself has not written any of the issues thus far, he does look over all that is published.

== Titles ==
The following lists the titles in order of release.

=== Gold Bug ===
An adaptation of Orson Scott Card's short story The Gold Bug, first published in Card's webzine InterGalactic Medicine Show, was released on March 17, 2007, as a bonus with the purchase of the hardcover edition of the comic adaptation Red Prophet: The Tales of Alvin Maker.

=== Ender's Game: Battle School ===
A five-part series based on Ender's Game, the first issue was released October 2008. The plot deals with the anticipated war between the human race and the "Formics," the same alien race who almost destroyed Earth once. The international military is training mankind's best and brightest children to mold them into the finest military minds ever, training them at a Battle School in space. 6-year-old Ender Wiggin, the main protagonist, is groomed for command as part of the elite program and must face daunting battle trials and simulations in order to save the planet.

=== Ender's Shadow: Battle School ===
A five-part series based on Ender's Shadow. The main protagonist is Bean, a mysterious, tiny orphan on the streets of Rotterdam, who will eventually enter Battle School and become known as the only person there who may be even more brilliant than Ender Wiggin.

=== Ender's Game: Command School ===
This five-part series picks up where Ender's Game: Battle School left off. At the age of 9, Ender Wiggin has been given his own army, and now commands 40 soldiers in a series of war games in preparation for invasion. But mystery and ambiguity surround him concerning the true nature of his supposed enemy, the aliens.

=== Ender's Shadow: Command School ===
This five-part series picks up where Ender's Shadow: Battle School left off and follows the story of Bean. Bean is assigned to the legendary Ender Wiggin's Dragon Army, but their relationship is fraught as both their egos and agendas clash.

=== Recruiting Valentine ===
Released in June 2009, this one-shot is the first comic book entry of the Enderverse to feature original new content not originally included in the novels, and was written by Jake Black (writer of the Ender's Game Companion). It centers upon Ender's two older siblings Peter and Valentine, who navigate struggles in their life back on Earth and display precocious signs of leadership in their own right. Valentine demonstrates her will and compassion in fighting injustice, and her older brother Peter guides his sister through the process of nonviolent influence, and sets the ball rolling for his plans to one day rule the world.

=== War of Gifts ===
Released December 2009, this one-shot comic is based on the novel of the same name, taking place during the events of Ender's Game and Ender's Shadow. The main protagonist is Zeck Morgan, a child raised by his minister father to be a pious, God-fearing child, devoted to his church. The International Fleet decides Zeck is a prime candidate for training in Battle School, and take him from his home to prepare him for war. Zeck refuses to participate in the school's war-games due to his pacifist religious beliefs. While there, Zeck sees a Dutch student give a friend a small present in celebration of Saint Nicholas' Eve —seemingly violating Battle School's rules against religious practice; the following events show the deep divisions between children of many religious and spiritual backgrounds thrown into Battle School.

=== Mazer in Prison ===
Released February 2010, this is a one-shot prequel based on the short story of the same name. The main character is Mazer Rackham, who is known as the only man ever to defeat the Formics in the second war, and takes place before the events of Ender's Game. The story centers around Mazer's involuntary exile from Earth and his efforts to transform the International Fleet into an organization capable of managing and winning the upcoming war. In the process he works with a young Hyrum Graff to establish the Battle School which Ender Wiggin will eventually attend.

=== The League War ===
Released April 2010. The events take place after the end of the final Formic War, amid the power struggle taking place on Earth between nations devoid of a common enemy. Peter and Valentine Wiggin, Ender's older and equally intelligent siblings, become central in the world war using nothing more than words published online.

=== Ender in Exile ===
A five-part series released from June–October 2010, Ender in Exile is based on the bestselling novel of the same name by Orson Scott Card and serves as the direct sequel to Ender's Game. Now thirteen, Ender Wiggin has successfully saved mankind from the alien threat, but having served his purpose, he is branded a monster by those who feel threatened by his military genius and sent into exile in space. He struggles with his own guilt and others who work to keep him powerless.

=== Speaker for the Dead ===
A five-part series released from January–May 2011, the events center upon a now-adult Ender Wiggin, who has written a book, Speaker for the Dead, which created a pseudo-religion spanning the known worlds. Ender is called upon to investigate a murder committed by a new alien species with a seemingly gruesome nature.

=== Formic Wars: Burning Earth ===
A seven-part series released from February–July 2011. It takes place well before the events of Ender's Game, focusing on the first Formic War. This is the second storyline in the comics not based on a preexisting novel or short story (the first was Recruiting Valentine, see above). It was eventually adapted into novel form, the First Formic War Trilogy.

=== Formic Wars: Silent Strike ===
A five-part series released from December 2011–April 2012. The story is also original to the comic book series. With 44 million people killed by the toxic gas that the alien Formics unleashed in China, the only hope of a counter-agent lies with Mazer Rackham and the Mobile Operations Police safely retrieving a sample. Meanwhile, young asteroid miner Victor Delgado has snuck aboard the Formic mother ship in hopes of taking it down alone.

== Chronological order of series ==
As with the Enderverse novels, the comics were not written in the order of the in-universe events. Within the story, the events of the comics take place in the following order:

1. Formic Wars: Burning Earth
2. Formic Wars: Silent Strike
3. Mazer in Prison
4. Ender's Game: Battle School/Ender's Shadow: Battle School
5. Recruiting Valentine
6. War of Gifts
7. Ender's Game: Command School/Ender's Shadow: Command School
8. The League War
9. Ender in Exile
10. Gold Bug
11. Speaker for the Dead

Chronological chart of Enderverse stories

| Short Stories | Novels | Comics | Audioplay | Film |

First Meetings (in the Enderverse) (2002 (2003)) Ender's Game Investment Counselor The Polish Boy Teacher's Pest
OSCs InterGalactic; Medicine Show (2008) Mazer in Prison Cheater Pretty Boy A Young Man with Prospects
Cheater (2006)
Ender's Shadow (1999) (Note: The events of Ender's Game, Ender's Shadow and A War of Gifts take place in roughly the same time period. The events of A War of Gifts only take place during the time at Battle School).) Ender's Shadow: Battle School (2009) Command School (2010) Ultimate collection (2012)
The Shadow Trilogy (Note: The events of Ender in Exile and the Shadow Trilogy take place in roughly the same time period.: First part of Ender in Exile (2/3) takes place during the Shadow Trilogy.; Last part of Ender in Exile (1/3) takes places after Shadow of the Giant.) (Note: Note on the following (maybe not yet so common) Trilogies: "Speaker Trilogy": Original set of sequels to Ender's Game, also referred to as: "Ender Quartet" (Ender's Game combined with "Speaker Trilogy"), also referred to as: "Ender Quintet" ("Ender Quartet" combined with Ender in Exile).; "Shadow Trilogy": Original set of sequels to Ender's Shadow, also referred to as: "Bean Quartet"/"Shadow Quartet" (Ender's Shadow combined with "Shadow Trilogy"), also referred to as: "Bean Quintet"/"Shadow Quintet" ("Bean Quartet" combined with Shadows in Flight), could be referred to as: "Bean Sextet"/"Shadow Sextet" ("Bean Quintet" combined with The Last Shadow)) Shadow of the Hegemon (2001) Shadow Puppets (2002) Shadow of the Giant (2005)
Shadows in Flight (2012)
Messenger (2018)
The Last Shadow (2021)

Formic Wars: Burning Earth (2011) Formic Wars: Silent Strike (2012) | First Formic; War Trilogy Earth Unaware (2012) Earth Afire (2013) Earth Awakens (2014)
Second Formic; War Trilogy The Swarm (2016) The Hive (2019) The Queens (TBA)
Mazer in Prison (2005) | Mazer in Prison (2010)
Pretty Boy (2006)
Ender's Game; Alive (2013) Recruiting Valentine (2009) The League War (2010) | Ender's Game (1977) Ender's Game (1985) Ender's Game: Battle School (2009) Command School (2010) Ultimate collection (2012) Ender's Game (2013)
Ender's Homecoming (2008) A Young Man with Prospects (2007) Ender in Flight (2008) The Gold Bug (2007) | Ender in Exile (2008) Ender in Exile (2011) Gold Bug (2010)
Governor Wiggin (2017)
Investment Counselor (1999)
Speaker for the Dead (2011) Gloriously Bright (1991) | The Speaker Trilogy Speaker for the Dead (1986) Xenocide (1991) Children of the Mind (1996)

War of Gifts (2010) Mazer in Prison Recruiting Valentine The League War War of Gifts
The Polish Boy (2002)
Teacher's Pest (2003)
Ender's Stocking (2007) A War of Gifts (2007) War of Gifts (2009)
Fleet School (Note: Title is also mentioned in regard to a possible sequel for the film.) Children of the Fleet (2017)... (TBC)
Renegat (2017)

== Collected editions ==
Gold Bug appears in the hardcover edition of Red Prophet: The Tales of Alvin Maker.

| Title | Material Collected | ISBN | Publication Date |
|---|---|---|---|
| Ender's Game: Battle School | Ender's Game: Battle School #1-5 | 0785135804 | July 29, 2009 |
| Ender's Shadow: Battle School | Ender's Shadow: Battle School #1-5 | 0785135960 | July 29, 2009 |
| Ender's Game: Command School | Ender's Game: Command School #1-5 | 0785135820 | March 24, 2010 |
| Ender's Shadow: Command School | Ender's Shadow: Command School #1-5 | 0785135987 | April 7, 2010 |
| Ender's Game: War of Gifts | Recruiting Valentine, War of Gifts, The League War, and Mazer in Prison | 0785135901 | June 16, 2010 |
| Ender's Game: Ender in Exile | Ender in Exile #1-5 | 0785135847 | January 26, 2011 |
| Ender's Game: Speaker for the Dead | Speaker for the Dead #1-5 | 0785135863 | July 20, 2011 |
| Ender's Game: Formic Wars: Burning Earth | Formic Wars: Burning Earth #1-7 | 0785136096 | September 21, 2011 |
| Ender's Game Ultimate Collection | Ender's Game: Battle School #1-5 and Ender's Game: Command School #1-5 | 0785163379 | January 18, 2012 |
| Ender's Shadow Ultimate Collection | Ender's Shadow: Battle School #1-5 and Ender's Shadow: Command School #1-5 | 0785163387 | February 15, 2012 |
| Ender's Game: Formic Wars: Silent Strike | Formic Wars: Silent Strike #1-5 | 0785136142 | July 25, 2012 |

== See also ==
- List of Ender's Game characters
- List of works by Orson Scott Card
- Ender's Game (series)
