= List of awards and nominations received by Orson Scott Card =

Orson Scott Card (born August 24, 1951) is an American writer known best for his science fiction works. As of 2024, he is the only person to have won a Hugo Award and a Nebula Award in consecutive years, winning both awards for his novel Ender's Game (1985) and its sequel Speaker for the Dead (1986).

== Career and lifetime achievement awards ==
Year & Award	Category	Result	Ref.
1987 Phoenix Award		Won	
1988 Locus Award	Best 80's Author	2nd Place	
1989 Interzone Readers Poll	All-Time Best SF Author	41st Place	
1992 Edward E. Smith Memorial Award		Won	
1999 Locus Award	Best SF/Fantasy Author of the 90's	11th Place	
2008 Whitney Awards	Lifetime Achievement award	Won	
2008 Margaret Edwards Award	for Ender's Game & Ender's Shadow	Won	
2016 AML Awards	The Smith-Pettit Foundation Award for Outstanding Contribution to Mormon Letters	Won	

Work	Year & Award	Category	Result	Ref.
"Ender's Game" (Novelette)	1978 Locus Award	Short Fiction	Nominated	
"Ender's Game" (Novelette)	1978 Astounding Award for Best New Writer		Won	
"Ender's Game" (Novelette)	1978 Hugo Award	Novelette	Nominated	
"Ender's Game" (Novelette)	1994 Premio Ignotus	Foreign Short Story	Won	
"Mikal's Songbird"	1978 Nebula Award	Novelette	Nominated	
"Mikal's Songbird"	1979 Locus Award	Novelette	Nominated	
"Mikal's Songbird"	1979 Hugo Award	Novelette	Nominated	
"Mikal's Songbird"	1979 Analog Readers Poll	Novelette	2nd Place	
"Lifeloop"	1979 Analog Readers Poll	Short Story	Won	
"Breaking the Game"	1980 Analog Readers Poll	Short Story	2nd Place	
"A Thousand Deaths"	1979 Locus Award	Short Story	Nominated	
"Unaccompanied Sonata"	1979 Nebula Award	Short Story	Nominated	
"Unaccompanied Sonata"	1980 Locus Award	Short Story	Nominated	
"Unaccompanied Sonata"	1980 Hugo Award	Short Story	Nominated	
"Quietus"	1980 Locus Award	Short Story	Nominated	
"Songhouse"	1980 Locus Award	Novella	Nominated	
"Songhouse"	1980 Hugo Award	Novella	Nominated	
"Songhouse"	1980 Analog Readers Poll	Novella	Won	
A Planet Called Treason	1980 Locus Award	SF Novel	Nominated	
Dragons of Light	1981 Locus Award	Anthology	Nominated	
Dragons of Light	1981 Balrog Awards	Collection/Anthology	Nominated	
Dragons of Light	1981 World Fantasy Award	Collection	Nominated	
"Saint Amy's Tale"	1981 Locus Award	Short Story	Nominated	
Songmaster	1981 Locus Award	SF Novel	Nominated	
Dragons of Darkness	1982 Locus Award	Anthology	Nominated	
Unaccompanied Sonata and Other Stories	1982 Locus Award	Collection	Nominated	
Saints (aka: A Woman of Destiny)	1984 AML Awards	Novel	Won	
Hart's Hope	1984 Locus Award	Fantasy Novel	Nominated	
"The Fringe"	1985 Nebula Award	Novelette	Nominated	
"The Fringe"	1986 Locus Award	Novelette	Nominated	
"The Fringe"	1986 Hugo Award	Novelette	Nominated	
Ender's Game	1985 Nebula Award	Novel	Won	
Ender's Game	1986 SF Chronicle Readers Poll	Novel	Won	
Ender's Game	1986 Locus Award	SF Novel	Nominated	
Ender's Game	1986 Hugo Award	Novel	Won	
Ender's Game	1991 Soaring Eagle Book Award		1st Runner-up	
Ender's Game	1998 Locus Award	Best SF Novels of All-Time	9th Place	
"Hatrack River"	1986 Nebula Award	Novelette	Nominated	
"Hatrack River"	1987 Locus Award	Novelette	Nominated	
"Hatrack River"	1987 World Fantasy Award	Novella	Won	
"Hatrack River"	1987 Hugo Award	Novelette	Nominated	
"Hatrack River"	1987 Asimov's Readers' Poll	Novelette	3rd Place	
"Hatrack River"	1987 SF Chronicle Readers Poll	Novelette	Nominated	
Speaker for the Dead	1986 Nebula Award	Novel	Won	
Speaker for the Dead	1987 Locus Award	SF Novel	Won	
Speaker for the Dead	1987 John W. Campbell Memorial Award	Science Fiction Novel	Nominated	
Speaker for the Dead	1987 Hugo Award	Novel	Won	
Speaker for the Dead	1987 SF Chronicle Readers Poll	Novel	Won	
Speaker for the Dead	1989 Kurd Laßwitz Award	Foreign Work	Won	
Ender's War	1986 SFBC Award	The Science Fiction Book Club's Book of the Year Award	Nominated	
"Salvage"	1987 Locus Award	Novelette	Nominated	
Cardography	1988 Locus Award	Collection	Nominated	
"Runaway"	1988 Locus Award	Novelette	Nominated	
"America"	1988 Locus Award	Novelette	Nominated	
"Eye for Eye"	1988 Locus Award	Novella	Nominated	
"Eye for Eye"	1988 Hugo Award	Novella	Won	
"Eye for Eye"	1988 Asimov's Readers' Poll	Novella	2nd Place	
"Eye for Eye"	1989 Seiun Award	Translated Short Story	Won	
"Carthage City"	1988 Asimov's Readers' Poll	Novella	5th Place	
Seventh Son	1988 Locus Award	Fantasy Novel	Won	
Seventh Son	1988 Mythopoeic Awards	Fantasy	Won	
Seventh Son	1988 World Fantasy Award	Novel	Nominated	
Seventh Son	1988 Hugo Award	Novel	Nominated	
Seventh Son	1989 Ditmar Award	International Fiction	Won	
Seventh Son	2000 Grand prix de l'Imaginaire	Foreign-language Novel	Won	
Red Prophet	1988 Nebula Award	Novel	Nominated	
Red Prophet	1989 Locus Award	Fantasy Novel	Won	
Red Prophet	1989 Mythopoeic Awards	Fantasy	Nominated	
Red Prophet	1989 Hugo Award	Novel	Nominated	
"Dowser"	1989 Locus Award	Novelette	Nominated	
"Dowser"	1989 Asimov's Readers' Poll	Novelette	Won	
"Lost Boys"	1989 Nebula Award	Short Story	Nominated	
"Lost Boys"	1990 Locus Award	Short Story	Won	
"Lost Boys"	1990 SF Chronicle Readers Poll	Short Story	Nominated	
"Lost Boys"	1990 Hugo Award	Short Story	Nominated	
Prentice Alvin	1989 Nebula Award	Novel	Nominated	
Prentice Alvin	1990 Locus Award	Fantasy Novel	Won	
Prentice Alvin	1990 Mythopoeic Awards	Fantasy	Nominated	
Prentice Alvin	1990 Hugo Award	Novel	Nominated	
The Folk of the Fringe	1990 Locus Award	Collection	Nominated	
"Dogwalker"	1990 Locus Award	Novelette	Won	
"Dogwalker"	1990 Hugo Award	Novelette	Nominated	
"Dogwalker"	1990 Asimov's Readers' Poll	Novelette	4th Place	
"Pageant Wagon"	1990 Locus Award	Novella	Nominated	
"Pageant Wagon"	1990 Asimov's Readers' Poll	Novella	2nd Place	
"The Originist"	1990 Locus Award	Novella	Nominated	
How to Write Science Fiction and Fantasy	1991 Locus Award	Non-Fiction	Nominated	
How to Write Science Fiction and Fantasy	1991 Hugo Award	Related Work	Won	
Maps in a Mirror: The Short Fiction of Orson Scott Card	1991 Locus Award	Collection	Won	
Xenocide	1991 AML Awards	Novel	Won	
Xenocide	1992 Hugo Award	Novel	Nominated	
Xenocide	1992 Locus Award	SF Novel	Nominated	
Future on Fire	1992 Locus Award	Anthology	Nominated	
Lost Boys (Novel)	1992 AML Awards	Novel	Won	
Lost Boys (Novel)	1993 Locus Award	Horror/Dark Fantasy Novel	Nominated	
Lost Boys (Novel)	2005 Audie Awards	Science Fiction	Won	
The Memory of Earth	1993 Locus Award	SF Novel	Nominated	
The Memory of Earth	1993 Prometheus Award		Nominated	
The Memory of Earth	1996 Grand prix de l'Imaginaire	Foreign Novel	Nominated	
The Call of Earth	1994 Locus Award	SF Novel	Nominated	
Lovelock (with Kathryn H. Kidd)	1995 Prometheus Award	Novel	Shortlisted	
Alvin Journeyman	1996 Locus Award	Fantasy Novel	Won	
Pastwatch: The Redemption of Christopher Columbus	1996 Sidewise Awards	Long Form	Nominated	
Pastwatch: The Redemption of Christopher Columbus	1999 Geffen Award	Translated Science Fiction Novel	Won	
Children of the Mind	1997 Locus Award	SF Novel	Nominated	
Children of the Mind	2002 Seiun Award	Translated Long Work	Nominated	
Black Mist and Other Japanese Futures (with Keith Ferrell)	1998 Locus Award	Anthology	Nominated	
Earthfall	1998 Grand prix de l'Imaginaire	Foreign Novel	Nominated	
Homebody	1999 Locus Award	Horror/Dark Fantasy Novel	Nominated	
Heartfire	1999 Locus Award	Fantasy Novel	Nominated	
Heartfire	1999 Prometheus Award	Novel	Shortlisted	
"Vessel"	2000 Locus Award	Novelette	Nominated	
Enchantment	2000 Locus Award	Fantasy Novel	Nominated	
Ender's Shadow	2000 Locus Award	SF Novel	Nominated	
Ender's Shadow	2000 Alex Awards		Won	
Ender's Shadow	2001 Geffen Award	Translated Science Fiction Novel	Won	
Ender's Shadow	2001 Seiun Award	Translated Long Work	Nominated	
"The Elephants of Poznan"	2001 Locus Award	Novelette	Nominated	
Masterpieces: The Best Science Fiction of the Century	2002 Locus Award	Anthology	Nominated	
First Meetings: Three Stories from the Enderverse	2002 Utah Speculative Fiction Award		Finalist	
Shadow of the Hegemon	2002 Locus Award	SF Novel	Nominated	
Shadow Puppets	2003 Locus Award	SF Novel	Nominated	
The Crystal City	2003 Utah Speculative Fiction Award		Finalist	
The Crystal City	2004 Locus Award	Fantasy Novel	Nominated	
Magic Street	2005 AML Awards	Novel Honorable Mention	Won	
Shadow of the Giant	2006 Locus Award	SF Novel	Nominated	
Shadow of the Giant	2006 Audie Awards	Science Fiction	Nominated	
Empire	2006 AML Awards	Novel Honorable Mention	Won	
Empire	2007 Prometheus Award	SF Novel	Finalist	
Ender in Exile	2008 Whitney Awards	Speculative Fiction	Finalist	
Hidden Empire	2010 Prometheus Award	SF Novel	Finalist	
Pathfinder	2010 Whitney Awards	Speculative Fiction	Finalist	
Pathfinder	2011 Locus Award	Young Adult Book	Nominated	
Pathfinder	2015 Seiun Award	Translated Long Work	Nominated	
The Lost Gate	2011 Whitney Awards	Speculative Fiction	Finalist	
The Lost Gate	2012 Westchester Fiction Award		Won	
Shadows in Flight	2012 Goodreads Choice Awards	Science Fiction	Nominated	
Earth Afire	2013 Goodreads Choice Awards	Science Fiction	Nominated	
Earth Awakens (with Aaron Johnston)	2014 Goodreads Choice Awards	Science Fiction	Nominated	
Writing Fantasy & Science Fiction (with Philip Athans)	2014 Killer Nashville Award	Non-Fiction - Craft and Business of Writing	Finalist	
Ender's Game Alive	2014 Audie Awards	Original Work	Nominated	
Lost and Found	2022 Utah Beehive Book Award	Young Adult	Nominated	
Wakers	2022 AML Awards	Young Adult Novel	Nominated	
