= Formic =

Formic is an adjective describing ants, from the Latin formica.

Formic may also refer to:

- Formic acid, a chemical compound secreted by ants for defense
- The Formics, or Buggers, an alien species in the Ender's Game novel series by Orson Scott Card
