= Orson Scott Card's InterGalactic Medicine Show =

2008 anthology edited by Edmund R. Schubert and Orson Scott Card

Orson Scott Card's InterGalactic Medicine Show (IGMS)
- First edition
- Editors: Orson Scott Card; Edmund R. Schubert
- Cover artist: Tomislav Tikulin
- Language: English
- Genre: Science fiction, fantasy
- Publisher: Tor Books
- Publication date: 2008
- Publication place: United States
- Media type: Print (paperback)
- Pages: 432
- ISBN: 0-7653-2000-2
- OCLC: 184823048

Orson Scott Card's InterGalactic Medicine Show (2008) is a science fiction and fantasy anthology edited by Edmund R. Schubert and Orson Scott Card.

Originally published in paperback by Tor Books in August 2008, it contains eighteen stories from Card's online magazine InterGalactic Medicine Show including four from Card set in his Ender's Game universe.

An audiobook version of the anthology was released by Blackstone Audio in November 2008, which contains an additional "special audio-only bonus" story, Ender's Homecoming.

== Contents ==
The stories included in the anthology are:

- "In the Eyes of the Empress’s Cat" – Bradley P. Beaulieu
- "Mazer in Prison" – Orson Scott Card
- "Tabloid Reporter to the Stars" – Eric James Stone
- "Audience" – Ty Franck
- "The Mooncalfe" – David Farland
- "Cheater" – Orson Scott Card
- "Dream Engine" – Tim Pratt
- "Hats Off" – David Lubar
- "Eviction Notice" – Scott M. Roberts
- "To Know All Things That Are in the Earth" – James Maxey
- "Beats of Seven" – Peter Orullian
- "Pretty Boy" – Orson Scott Card
- "Respite" – Rachel Ann Dryden
- "Fat Farm" – Aaron Johnston, based on the story by Orson Scott Card
- "The Box of Beautiful Things" – Brian Dolton
- "Taint of Treason" – Eric James Stone
- "Call Me Mr. Positive" – Tom Barlow
- "A Young Man with Prospects" – Orson Scott Card

Additional story on the audiobook release:

- "Ender's Homecoming" – Orson Scott Card

=== Audiobook ===
Produced by Emily Janice Card and Stefan Rudnicki, the stories are narrated by J. Paul Boehmer, Richard Brewer, Cassandra Campbell, Emily Janice Card, Mark Deakins, Vanessa Hart, Don Leslie, Rosalyn Landor, Stefan Rudnicki, Mirron Willis and Orson Scott Card.
