= Earth Unaware =

2012 novel by Orson Scott Card and Aaron Johnston

- Book cover, first edition, Hardback
- Author: Orson Scott Card and Aaron Johnston
- Cover artist: John Harris
- Language: English
- Series: Ender's Game series
- Genre: Science fiction
- Publisher: Tor Books
- Publication date: July 17, 2012
- Publication place: United States
- Media type: Print (Hardcover)
- Pages: 352 (Hardcover)
- ISBN: 0-7653-2904-2
- Followed by: Earth Afire

Earth Unaware is a science fiction novel by Orson Scott Card and Aaron Johnston in the Ender's Game series. Published in 2012, it is the first book of a prequel trilogy to Ender's Game. The novel is set before Ender Wiggin is born and tells the story of the first Formic War. Earth Afire, the second book in the trilogy, was released on June 4, 2013, and the conclusion, Earth Awakens, was released June 10, 2014.

Chart

Short Stories	Novels	Comics	Audioplay	Film

First Meetings (in the Enderverse) (2002 (2003)) Ender's Game Investment Counselor The Polish Boy Teacher's Pest
OSCs InterGalactic; Medicine Show (2008) Mazer in Prison Cheater Pretty Boy A Young Man with Prospects
Cheater (2006)
Ender's Shadow (1999) (Note: The events of Ender's Game, Ender's Shadow and A War of Gifts take place in roughly the same time period. The events of A War of Gifts only take place during the time at Battle School).) Ender's Shadow: Battle School (2009) Command School (2010) Ultimate collection (2012)
The Shadow Trilogy (Note: The events of Ender in Exile and the Shadow Trilogy take place in roughly the same time period.: First part of Ender in Exile (2/3) takes place during the Shadow Trilogy.; Last part of Ender in Exile (1/3) takes places after Shadow of the Giant.) (Note: Note on the following (maybe not yet so common) Trilogies: "Speaker Trilogy": Original set of sequels to Ender's Game, also referred to as: "Ender Quartet" (Ender's Game combined with "Speaker Trilogy"), also referred to as: "Ender Quintet" ("Ender Quartet" combined with Ender in Exile).; "Shadow Trilogy": Original set of sequels to Ender's Shadow, also referred to as: "Bean Quartet"/"Shadow Quartet" (Ender's Shadow combined with "Shadow Trilogy"), also referred to as: "Bean Quintet"/"Shadow Quintet" ("Bean Quartet" combined with Shadows in Flight), could be referred to as: "Bean Sextet"/"Shadow Sextet" ("Bean Quintet" combined with The Last Shadow)) Shadow of the Hegemon (2001) Shadow Puppets (2002) Shadow of the Giant (2005)
Shadows in Flight (2012)
Messenger (2018)
The Last Shadow (2021)

Formic Wars: Burning Earth (2011) Formic Wars: Silent Strike (2012)	First Formic; War Trilogy Earth Unaware (2012) Earth Afire (2013) Earth Awakens (2014)
Second Formic; War Trilogy The Swarm (2016) The Hive (2019) The Queens (TBA)
Mazer in Prison (2005)	Mazer in Prison (2010)
Pretty Boy (2006)
Ender's Game; Alive (2013) Recruiting Valentine (2009) The League War (2010)	Ender's Game (1977) Ender's Game (1985) Ender's Game: Battle School (2009) Command School (2010) Ultimate collection (2012) Ender's Game (2013)
Ender's Homecoming (2008) A Young Man with Prospects (2007) Ender in Flight (2008) The Gold Bug (2007)	Ender in Exile (2008) Ender in Exile (2011) Gold Bug (2010)
Governor Wiggin (2017)
Investment Counselor (1999)
Speaker for the Dead (2011) Gloriously Bright (1991)	The Speaker Trilogy Speaker for the Dead (1986) Xenocide (1991) Children of the Mind (1996)

War of Gifts (2010) Mazer in Prison Recruiting Valentine The League War War of Gifts
The Polish Boy (2002)
Teacher's Pest (2003)
Ender's Stocking (2007) A War of Gifts (2007) War of Gifts (2009)
Fleet School (Note: Title is also mentioned in regard to a possible sequel for the film.) Children of the Fleet (2017)... (TBC)
Renegat (2017)

Orson Scott Card described the connection between the Ender's Game (comics) Formic Wars: Burning Earth (2011) and Formic Wars: Silent Strike (2011–2012) and the first Formic Wars trilogy as such: "Aaron Johnston scripted the Formic Wars graphic novel series (Burning Earth; Silent Strike) from Marvel Comics; now we're creating novel versions of the same story. In a novel, we have room to really flesh out the stories, the characters, the relationships, and a lot of what lies behind and around the action".

== Plot ==
A family of "free miners" living on the spaceship El Cavador is working an asteroid far out in the Kuiper Belt when they detect what appears to be an alien ship decelerating from near light speed as it approaches the Solar System. Meanwhile, Lem Jukes, son and heir of the hard-driving founder of the largest mining corporation, is also in the remote region, far from the prying eyes of competitors, secretly testing a "glaser" (gravity laser) that promises to revolutionize mining. Back on Earth, Captain Wit O'Toole goes recruiting among the elite New Zealand Special Air Service for the even more select, multinational Mobile Operations Police (MOPs).

Jukes orders his ship to "bump" El Cavador from the asteroid the family is mining, as it is the only suitable one nearby for his test. During the violent collision, an El Cavador crewman is killed. The miners hack into the corporate ship's network, planting a message for Lem Jukes and downloading confidential files pertaining to the glaser. Jukes, fearful of a scandal involving the death of a free miner and the danger of the miners selling the confidential files to his competitors, sets out for Weigh Station Four, where he intends to plant a hacker to strip El Cavador's files.

El Cavador's transmission equipment having been destroyed in the bump, the crew are unable to warn another mining clan about the intruder, and can only watch helplessly as the alien pod destroys them. El Cavador rescues a few survivors. In the meantime, Victor and a few others modify a "quickship," an automated vessel normally used to send processed metals to Luna, to carry one person to warn Earth. When the pod attacks El Cavador, the men on the quickship ram and disable the pod using mining equipment. During the attack, the aliens emerge to battle the humans. Their physiology is revealed to be Formic (ant-like).

El Cavador heads to Weigh Station Four to use their laser line transmitter. As a backup, Victor volunteers to take a datacube with the evidence of the aliens' hostile intentions to Luna aboard the quickship. The journey is perilous, but their duty is clear.

Meanwhile, the Juke ship makes its way to Weigh Station Four, only to come under attack from roughnecks who recognize the crew as despised corporates. Several of the attackers are killed by Chubs, a man seemingly junior to Lem Jukes, but revealed as having been assigned by Ukko Jukes to protect him. The corporates are still able to leave behind a hacker to strip El Cavador's files, but the scheme becomes moot when the Formic ship destroys the station.

El Cavador sends a short-range, broad radio call and is able to contact the Juke ship and a Chinese mining vessel. El Cavador sends its women and children aboard the Chinese vessel, which is too small to help in the attack. The plan is to plant mining explosives along the hull of the alien ship. Unfortunately, one of them detonates early, drawing the attention of the Formics, who at first engage the humans wearing space suits, but subsequently attack without any protection. Seeing the battle go against them, Chubs withdraws Lem Jukes and his men and moves the corporate ship away, as the Formic ship destroys El Cavador.

Victor arrives at Luna, only to be largely ignored and confined for his illegal arrival. Meanwhile, Wit O'Toole prepares his MOPs for any situation, including what he thinks is a hypothetical alien attack. Victor is eventually assigned a case worker who believes his story and helps him transmit the evidence onto the Nets.

== Characters ==
- Victor Delgado, a young mechanic of great talent who, along with his father and a young apprentice, keeps El Cavador running
- Concepción Querales, captain of El Cavador
- Lem Jukes, son of mining magnate Ukko Jukes and captain of the Makarhu, a corporate mining vessel
- Captain DeWitt Clinton O'Toole, commander of the Mobile Operations Police (MOPs)
- Lieutenant Mazer Rackham, a Maori soldier whom O'Toole is interested in recruiting
- Alejandra, Victor's second cousin
- Mono, Victor's assistant

== See also ==
- List of Ender's Game characters
- Orson Scott Card bibliography
