= A War of Gifts: An Ender Story =

2007 novella by Orson Scott Card

- Author: Orson Scott Card
- Cover artist: John Harris
- Language: English
- Series: Ender's Game series
- Genre: science fiction
- Publisher: Tor Books
- Publication date: 2007
- Publication place: United States
- Media type: print (hardcover)
- Pages: 128
- ISBN: 0-7653-1282-4
- OCLC: 137222863
- Dewey Decimal: 813/.54 22
- LC Class: PS3553.A655 W37 2007
- Preceded by: Children of the Mind
- Followed by: Ender in Exile

A War of Gifts: An Ender Story is a 2007 science fiction novella by American writer Orson Scott Card. This book is set in Card's Ender's Game series and takes place during Ender Wiggin's time at Battle School as described in Card's novels Ender's Game and Ender's Shadow.

== Characters ==
=== Morgan family ===
- Zeck Morgan – the anti-hero protagonist.
- Reverend Habit Morgan – Zeck's father
- Unnamed – Zeck's mother
- Unnamed – Zeck's three younger siblings

=== Wiggin family ===
- Ender Wiggin
- Peter Wiggin – Ender's older brother
- Valentine Wiggin – Ender's older sister
- John Paul Wiggin – Ender's father
- Theresa Wiggin – Ender's mother

=== Students ===
- Dink Meeker – Dutch boy
- "Rose de Nose" Rosen
- Filippus "Flip" Rietveld – Dutch boy
- Bonzo Madrid
- Ahmed – Pakistani (Muslim) student

=== International Fleet personnel ===
- Captain Brridegan
- Agnes O'Toole – IF tester
- Colonel Graff – Battle School commander

== Literary significance and reception ==
A War of Gifts was not particularly well received by genre critics. The chief complaint with the story is that although it raises the issues of faith, religious freedom and religious suppression, it does so in a very superficial manner. Some critics have also commented on the character of Ender Wiggin who is described as being too Christ-like to be believable. A Publishers Weekly review described it as "an amusing and sincere tale". Kirkus Reviews described the story as a "Little League stocking stuffer that nevertheless makes several cogent points".

Chapter 2 of the piece, "Ender's Stocking," originally appeared in electronic form as the first third of the short story "Ender's Stocking," published in the October 2007 issue of Card's webzine InterGalactic Medicine Show. This chapter has been criticized for seeming to be unrelated to the rest of the book and for detracting from the rest of the story.

In 2016, the author released an abridged form of the story titled The War of Gifts for inclusion in the anthology Decision Points.

== Connection to other parts of the Ender series ==
In addition to being set during Ender's Game and Ender's Shadow, the Islamic counter reaction to the Christmas celebrations in A War of Gifts sows the seeds for the creation of the Muslim Caliphate by Battle School graduates which plays a major role in the Shadow series.

== See also ==
- Ender's Game (series)
- List of Ender's Game characters
- Orson Scott Card bibliography
