= Ender's Game (novel series) =

Series of novels by Orson Scott Card

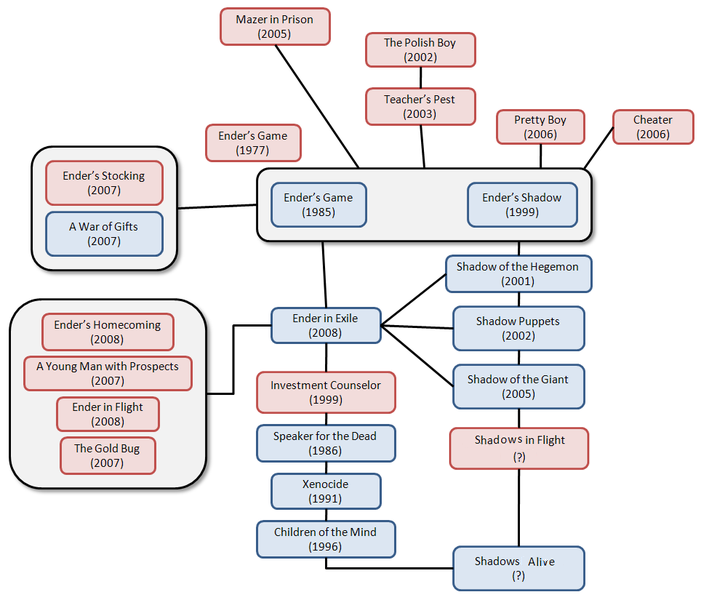
A flow chart of novels and stories in the Ender’s Game Universe.

The Ender's Game series (often referred to as the Ender saga and also the Enderverse) is a series of science fiction books written by American author Orson Scott Card. The series started with the novelette Ender's Game, which was later expanded into the novel of the same title. It currently consists of sixteen novels and thirteen short stories. The first two novels in the series, Ender's Game and Speaker for the Dead, each won both the Hugo and Nebula Awards.

The series is set in a future where mankind is facing annihilation by an aggressive alien society, an insect-like race known formally as "Formics", but more colloquially as "Buggers". The series protagonist, Andrew "Ender" Wiggin, is one of the child soldiers trained at Battle School (and eventually Command School) to be the future leaders for the protection of Earth.

== Enderverse ==
=== Ender series ===
Starting with Ender's Game, five novels and one novella have been released that tell the story of Ender. The first four have been described (and released as a box set) as The Ender Quartet and, together with Ender in Exile, as The Ender Quintet. Card first wrote Ender's Game as a novelette, but later expanded it into a novel.

While the first novel concerned itself with armies and space warfare, Speaker for the Dead, Xenocide, and Children of the Mind are more philosophical in nature, dealing with the difficult relationship between the humans and the "Piggies" (or "Pequeninos") on the alien planet of Lusitania, and Andrew's (Ender's) attempts to stop xenocide (the systematic eradication of an entire species) from occurring yet again.

A War of Gifts: An Ender Story, a novella, was released in October 2007. It is a parallel story set during Ender's first year in Battle School.

Ender in Exile, which is both a sequel to Ender's Game and a prequel to Speaker for the Dead, was released in November 2008. It involves Ender's journey to the first human colony on a former Formic world. Because of changes Card made to a few details of the story of that first colony ship and Ender's role as governor, it serves as a replacement for the last chapter of Ender's Game. It also deals with his meeting a character from the parallel Shadow saga (effectively wrapping up a remaining plotline in the parallel series).

=== Shadow saga ===
Starting with Ender's Shadow, five novels and one novella have been released that tell the story of the people Ender left behind – this has been dubbed the Shadow saga (also known as the "Shadow Quintet").

Ender's Shadow is a parallel novel to Ender's Game, telling many of the same events from the perspective of Bean, Ender's second-in-command and a mostly peripheral character in Ender's Game, while the first three sequels, Shadow of the Hegemon, Shadow Puppets and Shadow of the Giant tell the story of the struggle for world dominance after the Bugger War. This involves the Battle School children, as well as Ender's brother, Peter Wiggin, and Petra Arkanian going up against Achilles de Flandres (from Poke's crew).

A sequel novella to Shadow of the Giant named Shadows in Flight further introduces three of Bean's children who share his genetic mutation.

The Last Shadow, released in November 2021, takes place after both Children of the Mind and Shadows in Flight, tying up the two series, and explaining some unanswered questions.

=== Formic Wars ===
==== The First Formic War ====
Card and Aaron Johnston wrote a trilogy to cover the events of the First Formic War. Chronologically, this series comes before all other books in the Ender's Game series. Earth Unaware was released on July 17, 2012. Earth Afire, was released on June 4, 2013, and Earth Awakens on June 10, 2014.

==== The Second Formic War ====
On November 4, 2013, Johnston confirmed work on a second trilogy of novels covering the Second Formic War, with the manuscript for the first book due in 2014. The planned titles of the novels are (in order) The Swarm, The Hive, and The Queens. The Swarm, continuing the stories of Victor Delgado, Mazer Rackham, and Bingwen, was released on August 2, 2016. The Hive was released on June 11, 2019.

=== Fleet School ===
According to an interview with Orson Scott Card at Southern Virginia University, Fleet School is "a new set of sequels to Ender's Game. It's for a young adult audience. It's what happens to Battle School after the International Fleet loses its purpose of war. It becomes what is called Fleet School, and it prepares kids to become commanders / explorers in the colonies that are going to be forming. We get to see that as the school administrators repurpose the school, the Battle Room is still there, but it's a whole different kind of education." On November 12, 2015, Orson Scott Card announced the title of the series and its first novel, Children of the Fleet was released on October 10, 2017.

== Publications ==
=== Novels in the series ===
There are 19 publications in the Ender's Game series: five novels and one novella in the Ender series, five novels and one novella in the Shadow Saga, five novels in the Formic Wars series, one novel in the Fleet School series, and one collection of short stories. According to Card, there is no strictly preferred order of reading them, except that Xenocide should be read right before Children of the Mind. The books can be read in the order in which they were originally written or in chronological order.

==== Publication date ====
#	Title	Series	Format	Words	Release	Awards/Notes
1	Ender's Game	Ender Series	Novel	100,758	1985	Nebula Award winner, 1985; Hugo Award winner, 1986; Locus Award nominee, 1986
2	Speaker for the Dead	Ender Series	Novel	128,573	1986	Nebula Award winner, 1986; Hugo & Locus Awards winner, 1987; Campbell Award nominee, 1987
3	Xenocide	Ender Series	Novel	183,062	1991	Hugo and Locus Awards nominee, 1992
4	Children of the Mind	Ender Series	Novel	114,367	1996	
5	Ender's Shadow	Shadow Saga	Novel	140,223	1999	Shortlisted for a Locus Award, 2000
6	Shadow of the Hegemon	Shadow Saga	Novel	114,042	2001	Shortlisted for a Locus Award, 2002
7	Shadow Puppets	Shadow Saga	Novel	99,561	2002	
8	First Meetings	Ender Series	Collection	48,319	2002	"First Meetings" is a collection of three novellas and "Ender's Game".
9	Shadow of the Giant	Shadow Saga	Novel	106,531	2005	
10	A War of Gifts: An Ender Story	Ender Series	Novella	20,922	2007	
11	Ender in Exile	Ender Series	Novel	126,600	2008	
12	Shadows in Flight	Shadow Saga	Novella	54,113	2012	
13	Earth Unaware	Formic Wars	Novel	129,137	2012	
14	Earth Afire	Formic Wars	Novel	147,159	2013	
15	Earth Awakens	Formic Wars	Novel	135,172	2014	
16	The Swarm	Formic Wars	Novel	156,745	2016	
17	Children of the Fleet	Fleet School	Novel	101,065	2017	
18	The Hive	Formic Wars	Novel	132,965	2019	
19	The Last Shadow	Shadow Saga	Novel	94,185	2021	"Shadows in Flight" was originally planned as part of The Last Shadow (previously called "Shadows Alive")
20	The Queens	Formic Wars	Novel	TBA	TBA	
	Total			2,039,314		

==== Chronological order ====
Chronological chart of Enderverse stories

Short Stories	Novels	Comics	Audioplay	Film

First Meetings (in the Enderverse) (2002 (2003)) Ender's Game Investment Counselor The Polish Boy Teacher's Pest
OSCs InterGalactic; Medicine Show (2008) Mazer in Prison Cheater Pretty Boy A Young Man with Prospects
Cheater (2006)
Ender's Shadow (1999) (Note: The events of Ender's Game, Ender's Shadow and A War of Gifts take place in roughly the same time period. The events of A War of Gifts only take place during the time at Battle School).) Ender's Shadow: Battle School (2009) Command School (2010) Ultimate collection (2012)
The Shadow Trilogy (Note: The events of Ender in Exile and the Shadow Trilogy take place in roughly the same time period.: First part of Ender in Exile (2/3) takes place during the Shadow Trilogy.; Last part of Ender in Exile (1/3) takes places after Shadow of the Giant.) (Note: Note on the following (maybe not yet so common) Trilogies: "Speaker Trilogy": Original set of sequels to Ender's Game, also referred to as: "Ender Quartet" (Ender's Game combined with "Speaker Trilogy"), also referred to as: "Ender Quintet" ("Ender Quartet" combined with Ender in Exile).; "Shadow Trilogy": Original set of sequels to Ender's Shadow, also referred to as: "Bean Quartet"/"Shadow Quartet" (Ender's Shadow combined with "Shadow Trilogy"), also referred to as: "Bean Quintet"/"Shadow Quintet" ("Bean Quartet" combined with Shadows in Flight), could be referred to as: "Bean Sextet"/"Shadow Sextet" ("Bean Quintet" combined with The Last Shadow)) Shadow of the Hegemon (2001) Shadow Puppets (2002) Shadow of the Giant (2005)
Shadows in Flight (2012)
Messenger (2018)
The Last Shadow (2021)

Formic Wars: Burning Earth (2011) Formic Wars: Silent Strike (2012)	First Formic; War Trilogy Earth Unaware (2012) Earth Afire (2013) Earth Awakens (2014)
Second Formic; War Trilogy The Swarm (2016) The Hive (2019) The Queens (TBA)
Mazer in Prison (2005)	Mazer in Prison (2010)
Pretty Boy (2006)
Ender's Game; Alive (2013) Recruiting Valentine (2009) The League War (2010)	Ender's Game (1977) Ender's Game (1985) Ender's Game: Battle School (2009) Command School (2010) Ultimate collection (2012) Ender's Game (2013)
Ender's Homecoming (2008) A Young Man with Prospects (2007) Ender in Flight (2008) The Gold Bug (2007)	Ender in Exile (2008) Ender in Exile (2011) Gold Bug (2010)
Governor Wiggin (2017)
Investment Counselor (1999)
Speaker for the Dead (2011) Gloriously Bright (1991)	The Speaker Trilogy Speaker for the Dead (1986) Xenocide (1991) Children of the Mind (1996)

War of Gifts (2010) Mazer in Prison Recruiting Valentine The League War War of Gifts
The Polish Boy (2002)
Teacher's Pest (2003)
Ender's Stocking (2007) A War of Gifts (2007) War of Gifts (2009)
Fleet School (Note: Title is also mentioned in regard to a possible sequel for the film.) Children of the Fleet (2017)... (TBC)
Renegat (2017)

1. Earth Unaware
2. Earth Afire
3. Earth Awakens
4. The Swarm
5. The Hive
6. The Queens (TBA)
7. Ender's Shadow (Note: The events of Ender's Game and Ender's Shadow take place in roughly the same time period.)
8. Ender's Game
9. A War of Gifts (Note: This takes place during Ender's Game/Ender's Shadow.)
10. Shadow of the Hegemon
11. Children of the Fleet (Note: opening chapters take place during Shadow of the Hegemon.)
12. Shadow Puppets
13. Shadow of the Giant
14. Ender in Exile (Note: Beginning takes place during Shadow of the Hegemon and through Shadow of the Giant)
15. Shadows in Flight
16. First Meetings (Note: This is actually a collection of four short stories. The first two take place when Ender's parents are children and in their teens. The next is the original novella "Ender's Game". The last brings Ender and Jane together for the first time. "First Meetings" is listed right before "Speaker for the Dead" because the last story takes place when Ender had just turned 20.)
17. Speaker for the Dead
18. Xenocide
19. Children of the Mind
20. The Last Shadow

=== Comic books in the series ===
Comic books in the Ender Universe are currently being published by Marvel Comics.

=== Game ===
In 2008 it was announced an Ender's Game video game was in the works. It was to be known as Ender's Game: Battle Room and was a planned digitally distributed video game for all viable downloadable platforms. It was under development by Chair Entertainment, which also developed the Xbox Live Arcade games Undertow and Shadow Complex. Chair had sold the licensing of Empire to Card, which became a best-selling novel. Little was revealed about the game, save its setting in the Ender universe and that it would have focused on the Battle Room.

In December, 2010, it was announced that the video game development had stopped and the project put on indefinite hold.

Orson Scott Card and Amaze Entertainment also came to an agreement about a game adaption of the Ender's Game novel but the plans never became a reality.

=== Manga ===
In 2014, Satō Shūhō's manga, Ender's Game (Jp Ender no Game) appeared.

=== Film ===
The film Ender's Game was released in the UK on October 25, 2013, and in the USA on November 1, 2013. The first script was based on two installments of the Ender series, Ender's Game and Ender's Shadow, when optioned by Warner Brothers, but was adapted to focus exclusively on Ender's Game when purchased by Lionsgate. The cast includes Harrison Ford, Abigail Breslin, Ben Kingsley, Hailee Steinfeld, and Asa Butterfield as Ender Wiggin. The film was directed by Gavin Hood.

=== Related ===
==== The Authorized Ender Companion ====
Written by Jake Black, The Authorized Ender Companion is "the indispensable guide to the universe of Ender's Game." Sections in this book include: The Ender Encyclopedia, Ender's Timeline, Ender's Family Tree by Andrew Lindsay, Getting Ender Right: A Look at the Ender's Game Screenplay Development by Aaron Johnston, and The Technology of Ender's Game by Stephen Sywak. The majority of the book consists of encyclopedia references to the events, characters, locations, and technology found in the Ender's Game series up to the publication of Ender in Exile.

The book is notable for having new and behind the scenes information on certain topics such as Battle School Slang, The Look of the Formics, The History of Hyrum Graff, Ender and Valentine's Travels, and Mazer Rackham's Spaceship.

==== Ender's World: Fresh Perspectives on the SF Classic Ender's Game ====
Ender's World contains 14 essays from Science Fiction and Young Adult writers, as well as military strategists and others about various aspects of Ender's Game. The book includes an introduction by Orson Scott Card, who edited Ender's World and answers from many fan-submitted Enderverse questions from the Smart Pop Books Website. These essays are included in the compilation:

- "How It Should Have Ended" by Eric James Stone
- "The Monster's Heart" by John Brown
- "The Cost of Breaking the Rules" by Mary Robinette Kowal
- "Winning and Losing in Ender’s Game" by Hilari Bell
- "Parallax Regained" by David Lubar, Alison S. Myers
- "Mirror, Mirror" by Alethea Kontis
- "Size Matters" by Janis Ian
- "Rethinking the Child Hero" by Aaron Johnston
- "A Teenless World" by Mette Ivie Harrison
- "Ender on Leadership" by Colonel Tom Ruby
- "Ender Wiggin, USMC" by John F. Schmitt
- "The Price of Our Inheritance" by Neal Shusterman
- "If the Formics Love Their Children Too" by Ken Scholes
- "Ender's Game: A Guide to Life" by Matt Nix

== Formics ==
The Formics, also known as Buggers, are a fictional ant-like alien species from the Ender's Game series of science fiction novels by Orson Scott Card.

According to the novel canon, the Formics attacked Earth 50 years before the novel begins. They attempted to colonise the planet and were barely fought off by a New Zealand soldier known as Mazer Rackham. The first book in the series, Ender's Game, largely stems from the human quest to defend themselves from this species, although the Formics ultimately turn out as victims, with the first attack that they made on humans being an accident; the Formics not realizing that humans were intelligent due to humans having differing biology.

The term "Formic" is derived from formica, the Latin word for ant; whereas "bugger" is a pejorative used by humans; yet it was not until 1999's Ender's Shadow that the term 'Formic' was first used, interchangeably with 'Bugger'. Later books used 'Formic' almost exclusively, as the more 'scientific' term. This leads to odd scenarios in the continuity of the books, such as Valentine referring to them as "Buggers" in Ender's Game, chronologically next as "Formics" in Ender in Exile, and again as "Buggers" in Speaker for the Dead and Xenocide. The feature film adaptation of Ender's Game uses "Formics" exclusively.

The Formic species consists of hive-minded colonies directed by queens. In Ender's Game, Graff described them as being an insect that "could have evolved on earth, if things had gone a different way a billion years ago," and that their evolutionary ancestors could have looked similar to Earth's ants. While often described as "insectoid", the Formics are warm-blooded, developed an internal skeleton and shed most of their exoskeleton, evolved a complex system of internal organs, and they respire and perspire. If a queen dies, all the workers under her control lose their ability to function immediately; but in Xenocide, implications exist that 'workers' can escape the influence of a queen. The Formic race is revealed to be trimorphic in Shadows in Flight. Drones are much smaller and depend on a Hive Queen for survival, and their bodies are shaped to spend their lives clinging to her, until upon her death, they take flight to seek out a new queen. Drones are capable of individual thought and action as well as mind-to-mind communication, more limited than that of a queen; whereas queens communicate instantaneously and can even do so with other species. Formics live in vast underground colonies, usually without light, informing the assumption that Formics make use of sensory apparatus outside the range of the electromagnetic spectrum visible to humans. In the first novel they have artificial lighting; whereas in Xenocide, Ender claims they rely on heat signature.

== See also ==
- Ender's Game (film)
- List of characters in the Ender's Game series
- List of works by Orson Scott Card
- Zerg - an alien race from the Starcraft universe, similar to the Formics

== Notes ==
1. Ender's Game. p. 237. "Valentine shivered, as if a cold breeze had suddenly passed. 'I refuse to watch the bugger vids anymore. They're always the same.'"
2. Ender in Exile. p. 46. "'The formics' worlds were all in the same arm of the galaxy as us, and not all that far away, as galaxies go,' said Valentine primly, to goad him."
3. Xenocide. p. 173. "'What's wrong with the buggers getting offplanet?' asked Valentine."

== Sources ==
- Ender's Game by Orson Scott Card
- Ender's Shadow by Orson Scott Card
- Speaker for the Dead by Orson Scott Card
- Xenocide by Orson Scott Card
- Children of the Mind by Orson Scott Card
- First Meetings by Orson Scott Card
- Ender in Exile by Orson Scott Card
