= The Last Shadow =

Book by Orson Scott Card

- First edition
- Author: Orson Scott Card
- Cover artist: John Harris
- Language: English
- Series: Ender's Game series
- Genre: Science fiction
- Publisher: Tor Books
- Publication date: 16 November 2021
- Publication place: United States
- Preceded by: Children of the Mind, Shadows in Flight

The Last Shadow is a 2021 science fiction novel by American writer Orson Scott Card, part of his Ender's Game series. It links the Shadow Saga (the parallel companion series) back to the original Ender series. This book brings the two series back together, and wraps up some of the plot threads left dangling in Shadow of the Giant (the fourth book in the Shadow Saga). The events in the book follow those in Children of the Mind, the final book in the Ender series.

Card has said that he began writing the first pages of the novel while quarantined during the COVID-19 pandemic. The novel was originally set to be titled Shadows in Flight, but Card decided to swap titles with the fifth book in the Shadow series (released on 17 January 2012), which serves as a bridge to the final book. The concluding events of Shadows in Flight were initially planned for the first chapter of the final book, with working title Shadows Alive.

== Plot ==
Chart

Short Stories	Novels	Comics	Audioplay	Film

First Meetings (in the Enderverse) (2002 (2003)) Ender's Game Investment Counselor The Polish Boy Teacher's Pest
OSCs InterGalactic; Medicine Show (2008) Mazer in Prison Cheater Pretty Boy A Young Man with Prospects
Cheater (2006)
Ender's Shadow (1999) (Note: The events of Ender's Game, Ender's Shadow and A War of Gifts take place in roughly the same time period. The events of A War of Gifts only take place during the time at Battle School).) Ender's Shadow: Battle School (2009) Command School (2010) Ultimate collection (2012)
The Shadow Trilogy (Note: The events of Ender in Exile and the Shadow Trilogy take place in roughly the same time period.: First part of Ender in Exile (2/3) takes place during the Shadow Trilogy.; Last part of Ender in Exile (1/3) takes places after Shadow of the Giant.) (Note: Note on the following (maybe not yet so common) Trilogies: "Speaker Trilogy": Original set of sequels to Ender's Game, also referred to as: "Ender Quartet" (Ender's Game combined with "Speaker Trilogy"), also referred to as: "Ender Quintet" ("Ender Quartet" combined with Ender in Exile).; "Shadow Trilogy": Original set of sequels to Ender's Shadow, also referred to as: "Bean Quartet"/"Shadow Quartet" (Ender's Shadow combined with "Shadow Trilogy"), also referred to as: "Bean Quintet"/"Shadow Quintet" ("Bean Quartet" combined with Shadows in Flight), could be referred to as: "Bean Sextet"/"Shadow Sextet" ("Bean Quintet" combined with The Last Shadow)) Shadow of the Hegemon (2001) Shadow Puppets (2002) Shadow of the Giant (2005)
Shadows in Flight (2012)
Messenger (2018)
The Last Shadow (2021)

Formic Wars: Burning Earth (2011) Formic Wars: Silent Strike (2012)	First Formic; War Trilogy Earth Unaware (2012) Earth Afire (2013) Earth Awakens (2014)
Second Formic; War Trilogy The Swarm (2016) The Hive (2019) The Queens (TBA)
Mazer in Prison (2005)	Mazer in Prison (2010)
Pretty Boy (2006)
Ender's Game; Alive (2013) Recruiting Valentine (2009) The League War (2010)	Ender's Game (1977) Ender's Game (1985) Ender's Game: Battle School (2009) Command School (2010) Ultimate collection (2012) Ender's Game (2013)
Ender's Homecoming (2008) A Young Man with Prospects (2007) Ender in Flight (2008) The Gold Bug (2007)	Ender in Exile (2008) Ender in Exile (2011) Gold Bug (2010)
Governor Wiggin (2017)
Investment Counselor (1999)
Speaker for the Dead (2011) Gloriously Bright (1991)	The Speaker Trilogy Speaker for the Dead (1986) Xenocide (1991) Children of the Mind (1996)

War of Gifts (2010) Mazer in Prison Recruiting Valentine The League War War of Gifts
The Polish Boy (2002)
Teacher's Pest (2003)
Ender's Stocking (2007) A War of Gifts (2007) War of Gifts (2009)
Fleet School (Note: Title is also mentioned in regard to a possible sequel for the film.) Children of the Fleet (2017)... (TBC)
Renegat (2017)

Bean Delphiki's altered children, the Leguminids, (Note: Introduced in Shadows in Flight) have ensured the survival of their new species by mating with humans from a colony world. When the grandchildren were young, the Leguminids stole them away to raise them in space. The Leguminids receive a transmission from a Hyrum Graff hologram telling them that they must go to the planet of Lusitania to assist with an investigation of the planet of Descoladora. The residents of the planet of Lusitania are investigating Descoladora because they received a transmission of the full genome of the descolada virus from the planet, and they feared a resurgence of the deadly plague. (Note: This transmission was received at the end of Children of the Mind.)

Jane and Miro Ribeira instantaneously travel to the Leguminid's ship to recruit them. (Note: Using the method of instantaneous travel developed in Children of the Mind.) Ultimately, Jane decides to use the grandchildren to research the planet and sends Bean's children to reconcile with their spouses. One of the grandchildren, a girl named Thulium, wanders on the planet and discovers that the Formics have thrived on Lusitania. (Note: As a result of Ender Wiggin's actions during his series) She develops a relationship with the Hive Queen.

Among the research team is Peter Wiggin II, a genetic copy of Ender Wiggin's brother who contains Ender Wiggin's Aiúa, (Note: Something like a soul that can connect one being to another via philotic connections described in Xenocide and Children of the Mind.) and Si Wang-mu, his wife. Using the limitless financial resources that Jane had amassed for Ender Wiggin during his life, (Note: Described in Speaker for the Dead.) they accumulate the material necessary to effectuate a study of the planet. Jane teaches Peter how to use instantaneous travel and tells him to establish connections with Wang-mu and Thulium so that they could travel with him to the surface of the planet. Peter and Wang-mu travel to the surface alone to collect samples. While there, they encounter sentient keas and ravens who taunt and steal from them. Wang-mu negotiates with them and establishes first contact.

Thulium and her cousin, Sprout, go to the surface of the planet alone, using instant transportation because Thulium picked it up by traveling with Peter. There, they are also accosted by birds. Although Thulium leaves, Sprout stays and has his head encased in a cement made of bird poop. After proving himself to the birds by pretending to drown, the birds introduce Sprout to a descendant of humans who had colonized the world around the time of the First Formic War. This human's ancestors from Earth had altered their children's genome to create a species with arms as long as they are tall and with hands for feet, creating a subspecies called the Engineers because their augmentations were useful for construction. This Engineer tells him of the history of his people and of the other species of human on the planet, who live underground and are called The Folk. They call the planet "Nest." The Engineers had broadcast the genome of the Descolada to the Lusitanians' ship in orbit. They understood the Descolada as a harmless Recorder virus rather than a deadly pathogen. It seemed to them that its purpose was to record all life in the universe. They were not the ones who had created it or sent it to Lusitania.

The residents of Lusitania, now joined by Bean's children, are invited to meet The Folk underground. When they arrive, they find that Thulium had already used instant transportation to meet The Folk several hours earlier. Although all seems well at first, The Folk had exposed Thulium to a biological weapon. The Lusitanians retreat to try to find a cure, because they have all been exposed and will soon be experiencing Thulium's illness. Most of their efforts fail, but they take Thulium to the Hive Queen, who saves her life using worms from Lusitania to cleanse Thulium's body of most of the bioweapon.

When Peter and Wang-mu return to the surface of Nest, they find that dozens or hundreds of the sentient birds had suddenly died. The Lusitanians organize a refugee program to seed the birds and the Engineers on various worlds colonized by humans, preventing a xenocide. The Lusitanians resolve not to return to Nest, because the remaining inhabitants are considered hostile.

Through more research, the Lusitanians determine that the Descolada virus as Lusitania had experienced it was the result of a mutation. While in transit between planets, the virus folded itself into a configuration that made it likely that its cells would be bombarded with cosmic radiation and damaged in a way that made it a deadly pathogen. Although they did not discover the origin of the Recorder virus, they published their scientific results and described methods for neutralizing the Descolada virus.

Afterwards, the research team went their separate ways. Jane resolved that no other people would be taught how to perform instantaneous travel. Peter and Wang-mu had a child.

== See also ==
- List of Ender's Game characters
- Orson Scott Card bibliography
