= Aaron Johnston (writer) =

American science-fiction author

Aaron Johnston is an American author, comics writer, and film producer.

Johnston was an associate producer on the movie Ender's Game, including a cameo appearance as an International Fleet officer. He co-authored with Orson Scott Card the First Formic War trilogy, a prequel series to Ender's Game. The series includes Earth Unaware, Earth Afire, and Earth Awakens.

His second pre-Ender series includes The Swarm and The Hive. These are concluded with the final tales of the second Formic war relayed in The Queens, setting the stage for Card's Ender's Game series and the third Formic war.

His comic credits for Marvel Comics include Ender in Exile, Speaker for the Dead, Formic Wars, League War, and Mazer in Prison.

He was a writer for BYUtv's original series Extinct and provided the voice for Blue Drone in the series.

His play, Lifeloop, is an adaptation of Card's short story.

Johnston is a member of the Church of Jesus Christ of Latter-day Saints. He first met Card when in the same stake of the church in North Carolina.

== Bibliography ==
=== Novels ===
Title	Year	Series	Format	Notes
Invasive Procedures	2007	None	Novel	
Earth Unaware	2012	Ender's Game	Novel	
Earth Afire	2013	Ender's Game	Novel	
Earth Awakens	2014	Ender's Game	Novel	
The Swarm	2016	Ender's Game	Novel	
The Hive	2019	Ender's Game	Novel	

=== Comics ===
Title	Year	Series	Format	Notes
Mazer in Prison	2010	Ender's Game	Comic	
Ender in Exile	2010	Ender's Game	Comic	
Speaker for the Dead	2011	Ender's Game	Comic	
Formic Wars: Burning Earth	2011	Ender's Game	Comic	
Formic Wars: Silent Strike	2012	Ender's Game	Comic	

=== Filmography ===
Title	Year	Notes
Ender's Game	2013	Associate producer
Extinct	2017	Writer
Saving Me	2022	Creator

== Sources ==
- About Aaron - aaronwjohnston.com
- AARON JOHNSTON – MacMillan
