= Ender's Shadow =

1999 novel by Orson Scott Card

- First edition
- Author: Orson Scott Card
- Cover artist: Lisa Falkenstern
- Language: English
- Series: Ender's Game series
- Genre: Science fiction
- Publisher: Tor Books
- Publication date: September 1999
- Publication place: United States
- Media type: Print (Hardcover & Paperback)
- Pages: 379 (Hardcover); 480 (Paperback)
- ISBN: 0-312-86860-X
- OCLC: 41565235
- Dewey Decimal: 813/.54 21
- LC Class: PS3553.A655 E58 1999
- Followed by: Shadow of the Hegemon

Ender's Shadow (1999) is a parallel science fiction novel by the American author Orson Scott Card, taking place at the same time as the novel Ender's Game and depicting some of the same events from the point of view of Bean, a supporting character in the original novel. It was originally to be titled Urchin, but it was retitled Ender's Shadow prior to release. Ender's Shadow was shortlisted for a Locus Award in 2000.

== Plot summary ==
Chart

Short Stories	Novels	Comics	Audioplay	Film

First Meetings (in the Enderverse) (2002 (2003)) Ender's Game Investment Counselor The Polish Boy Teacher's Pest
OSCs InterGalactic; Medicine Show (2008) Mazer in Prison Cheater Pretty Boy A Young Man with Prospects
Cheater (2006)
Ender's Shadow (1999) (Note: The events of Ender's Game, Ender's Shadow and A War of Gifts take place in roughly the same time period. The events of A War of Gifts only take place during the time at Battle School).) Ender's Shadow: Battle School (2009) Command School (2010) Ultimate collection (2012)
The Shadow Trilogy (Note: The events of Ender in Exile and the Shadow Trilogy take place in roughly the same time period.: First part of Ender in Exile (2/3) takes place during the Shadow Trilogy.; Last part of Ender in Exile (1/3) takes places after Shadow of the Giant.) (Note: Note on the following (maybe not yet so common) Trilogies: "Speaker Trilogy": Original set of sequels to Ender's Game, also referred to as: "Ender Quartet" (Ender's Game combined with "Speaker Trilogy"), also referred to as: "Ender Quintet" ("Ender Quartet" combined with Ender in Exile).; "Shadow Trilogy": Original set of sequels to Ender's Shadow, also referred to as: "Bean Quartet"/"Shadow Quartet" (Ender's Shadow combined with "Shadow Trilogy"), also referred to as: "Bean Quintet"/"Shadow Quintet" ("Bean Quartet" combined with Shadows in Flight), could be referred to as: "Bean Sextet"/"Shadow Sextet" ("Bean Quintet" combined with The Last Shadow)) Shadow of the Hegemon (2001) Shadow Puppets (2002) Shadow of the Giant (2005)
Shadows in Flight (2012)
Messenger (2018)
The Last Shadow (2021)

Formic Wars: Burning Earth (2011) Formic Wars: Silent Strike (2012)	First Formic; War Trilogy Earth Unaware (2012) Earth Afire (2013) Earth Awakens (2014)
Second Formic; War Trilogy The Swarm (2016) The Hive (2019) The Queens (TBA)
Mazer in Prison (2005)	Mazer in Prison (2010)
Pretty Boy (2006)
Ender's Game; Alive (2013) Recruiting Valentine (2009) The League War (2010)	Ender's Game (1977) Ender's Game (1985) Ender's Game: Battle School (2009) Command School (2010) Ultimate collection (2012) Ender's Game (2013)
Ender's Homecoming (2008) A Young Man with Prospects (2007) Ender in Flight (2008) The Gold Bug (2007)	Ender in Exile (2008) Ender in Exile (2011) Gold Bug (2010)
Governor Wiggin (2017)
Investment Counselor (1999)
Speaker for the Dead (2011) Gloriously Bright (1991)	The Speaker Trilogy Speaker for the Dead (1986) Xenocide (1991) Children of the Mind (1996)

War of Gifts (2010) Mazer in Prison Recruiting Valentine The League War War of Gifts
The Polish Boy (2002)
Teacher's Pest (2003)
Ender's Stocking (2007) A War of Gifts (2007) War of Gifts (2009)
Fleet School (Note: Title is also mentioned in regard to a possible sequel for the film.) Children of the Fleet (2017)... (TBC)
Renegat (2017)

Bean is a homeless child living on the hellish streets of Rotterdam around 2170 after escaping as an infant from an illegal genetic engineering laboratory. Highly intelligent and extremely young, he is on the brink of dying from starvation, but manages to convince a nine-year-old named Poke to let him join her band of homeless children by offering her an idea. He tells Poke she should recruit an older bully to help fend off other bullies who prevent the younger children from eating at a local soup kitchen. She chooses Achilles, a bully with a bad leg; Bean realizes that Achilles is too intelligent and dangerous a choice, but is unable to change Poke's mind. Achilles is able to manipulate Poke's group, gaining the trust of all except for Bean, and eventually kills Poke.

Bean's incredible intelligence, creativity and determination bring him to the attention of Sister Carlotta, a nun who is recruiting children for the International Fleet (IF) for a war of survival against the alien Buggers. She gets him admitted to Battle School, despite official resistance and skepticism about his background. Bean has to overcome being much younger and smaller than the other child recruits and faces scrutiny when it is revealed that he scored record highs in all of the school's mental tests. As he proves himself, they constantly compare him to Ender Wiggin, another prodigy who preceded him a few years before Bean's admittance to Battle School. Bean begins to ferret out secrets and truths about the school. Meanwhile, Sister Carlotta uncovers Bean's past, trying to find a reason why he is so mentally gifted.

Ender has been chosen as the best chance to save humanity from the Buggers; Bean is selected to be the backup in case Ender breaks down. Bean is assigned to draw up the roster for Ender's army, called Dragon Army. At first, Ender does not appear to recognize Bean's brilliance, but time shows that he was grooming Bean and he finally puts Bean in charge of a special new platoon within the army to handle extraordinary missions. Ender wins combat games against the other, more established armies within the Battle School; as time goes on, the other side is given more and more unfair advantages, but Ender never loses. Ender and the leaders of several armies all graduate at the same time, giving Bean and other former members of Dragon Army command of the various armies in Battle School. Achilles, with his leg healed joins Battle School, having also been selected for his high intelligence. Sister Carlotta pleads with the Battle School administration to not admit Achilles due to his manipulative tendencies and past history with Bean, but in vain. Bean concocts a scheme to trap Achilles and make him confess to multiple murders, including Poke's, revealing that he is a sociopath bent on killing anyone who has seen or made him helpless. The IF arrests Achilles, and Bean graduates from Battle School to Tactics School. In Tactics School, Bean learns about historical defensive strategies and eventually hacks onto an officer's desk (similar to a tablet) and distributes a memo suggesting that the best strategy for humanity is to attack the Buggers and wipe them out. This memo causes panic in the IF, as they are unable to trace the memo's origins, and the memo perfectly details humanity's actual battle strategy.

Eventually, Bean and other students graduate from Battle School to work under Ender, who now commands one side in electronically simulated battles; he is told that his foe is Mazer Rackham, the hero who saved humanity from the Second Invasion. (Rackham had been sent out in space and back on a fast starship so as to age more slowly due to time dilation.) However, Bean deduces that the "simulations" are real battles: Ender and his "jeesh" are commanding human fleets attacking Bugger colony planets using the ansible, an instantaneous communications device. The pace increases and the enemy forces become larger and more advanced. Through it all, Ender keeps on winning, but he begins to struggle; at times, Bean gives the jeesh additional commands. In the final battle at the Buggers' home planet, Ender faces seemingly impossible odds against a gigantic Bugger fleet; his only edge is a weapon—"Dr Device"—that can start a chain reaction that destroys matter; if the matter is concentrated enough, it triggers a chain reaction. Ender freezes, unable to come up with a plan, until Bean's prompt (inadvertently) shows him how he can win. Ender unknowingly commits genocide by destroying the Buggers' home world with Dr. Device.

Bean makes friends with an older boy named Nikolai. Sister Carlotta discovers that the two boys are genetic twins, except for Bean's genetic enhancements. When Bean was illegally genetically engineered, the scientist Volescu had "turned Anton's Key," meaning that Bean's body—including his brain—will never stop growing, which will result in a premature death between the ages of fifteen and twenty-five. Sister Carlotta ensures that Bean will get to live with Nikolai and his parents after the war. After they defeat the Buggers, Bean is united with his real parents and Nikolai.

Ender's Shadow is the first of a series that includes Shadow of the Hegemon, Shadow Puppets, Shadow of the Giant, Shadows in Flight, and The Last Shadow.

== Comics ==
A five-issue comic book limited series based on Ender's Shadow, called Ender's Shadow: Battle School. was released on December 3, 2008. It was written by Mike Carey, with art by Sebastian Fiumara.

== Awards ==
The novel has received numerous awards, including:

- New York Times bestseller (Fiction, 1999)
- SF Site Reader's Choice (1999)
- Alex Awards (2000)
- ALA Best Books for Young Adults (2000)
- Geffen Award (Best Translated Science Fiction Book, 2001)
- ALA Popular Paperbacks for Young Adults (2004)

== Translations ==
- (China) Chinese: "安德的影子"
- (Czech Republic) Czech: "Enderův stín"
- (Israel) Hebrew: "הצל של אנדר"
- (Netherlands) Dutch: "Enders Schaduw"
- (Poland) Polish: "Cień Endera"
- (Russia) Russian: "Тень Эндера"
- (Spain) Spanish: "La sombra de Ender"
- (Romania) Romanian: "Umbra lui Ender"
- (France) French: "La Stratégie de l'Ombre" ("The Shadow's Strategy")
- (Germany) German: "Enders Schatten"
- (Hungary) Hungarian: "Ender árnyéka"
- (South Korea) Korean: "엔더의 그림자"
- (Bulgaria) Bulgarian: "Сянката на Ендър"

== See also ==
- List of Ender's Game characters
- Orson Scott Card bibliography
