= Ender in Exile =

2008 novel by Orson Scott Card

- First edition
- Author: Orson Scott Card
- Cover artist: John Harris
- Language: English
- Series: Ender's Game series
- Genre: Science fiction
- Publisher: Tor Books
- Publication date: November 11, 2008
- Publication place: United States
- Media type: Print (hardback & paperback)
- Pages: 465
- ISBN: 0-7653-0496-1
- OCLC: 223884539
- Dewey Decimal: 813/.54 22
- LC Class: PS3553.A655 E498 2008
- Preceded by: Ender's Game; Shadow of the Giant
- Followed by: Shadows in Flight

Ender in Exile is a science fiction novel by American writer Orson Scott Card, part of the Ender's Game series, published on November 11, 2008. It takes place between the two award-winning novels Ender's Game and Speaker for the Dead. It could also be considered a parallel novel to the first three sequels in the Shadow Saga, since the entirety of this trilogy takes place in the span of Ender in Exile. The novel concludes a dangling story line of the Shadow Saga, while it makes several references to events that take place during the Shadow Saga. From yet another perspective, the novel expands (or replaces) the last chapter of the original novel Ender's Game. On the one hand, it fills the gap right before the last chapter, and on the other hand, it fills the gap between the last chapter and the original (first) sequel (both named Speaker for the Dead). Ender in Exile begins one year after Ender has won the bugger war, and begins with the short story "Ender's Homecoming" from Card's webzine Intergalactic Medicine Show. Other short stories that were published elsewhere are included as chapters of the novel.

== Plot ==
Chart

Short Stories	Novels	Comics	Audioplay	Film

First Meetings (in the Enderverse) (2002 (2003)) Ender's Game Investment Counselor The Polish Boy Teacher's Pest
OSCs InterGalactic; Medicine Show (2008) Mazer in Prison Cheater Pretty Boy A Young Man with Prospects
Cheater (2006)
Ender's Shadow (1999) (Note: The events of Ender's Game, Ender's Shadow and A War of Gifts take place in roughly the same time period. The events of A War of Gifts only take place during the time at Battle School).) Ender's Shadow: Battle School (2009) Command School (2010) Ultimate collection (2012)
The Shadow Trilogy (Note: The events of Ender in Exile and the Shadow Trilogy take place in roughly the same time period.: First part of Ender in Exile (2/3) takes place during the Shadow Trilogy.; Last part of Ender in Exile (1/3) takes places after Shadow of the Giant.) (Note: Note on the following (maybe not yet so common) Trilogies: "Speaker Trilogy": Original set of sequels to Ender's Game, also referred to as: "Ender Quartet" (Ender's Game combined with "Speaker Trilogy"), also referred to as: "Ender Quintet" ("Ender Quartet" combined with Ender in Exile).; "Shadow Trilogy": Original set of sequels to Ender's Shadow, also referred to as: "Bean Quartet"/"Shadow Quartet" (Ender's Shadow combined with "Shadow Trilogy"), also referred to as: "Bean Quintet"/"Shadow Quintet" ("Bean Quartet" combined with Shadows in Flight), could be referred to as: "Bean Sextet"/"Shadow Sextet" ("Bean Quintet" combined with The Last Shadow)) Shadow of the Hegemon (2001) Shadow Puppets (2002) Shadow of the Giant (2005)
Shadows in Flight (2012)
Messenger (2018)
The Last Shadow (2021)

Formic Wars: Burning Earth (2011) Formic Wars: Silent Strike (2012)	First Formic; War Trilogy Earth Unaware (2012) Earth Afire (2013) Earth Awakens (2014)
Second Formic; War Trilogy The Swarm (2016) The Hive (2019) The Queens (TBA)
Mazer in Prison (2005)	Mazer in Prison (2010)
Pretty Boy (2006)
Ender's Game; Alive (2013) Recruiting Valentine (2009) The League War (2010)	Ender's Game (1977) Ender's Game (1985) Ender's Game: Battle School (2009) Command School (2010) Ultimate collection (2012) Ender's Game (2013)
Ender's Homecoming (2008) A Young Man with Prospects (2007) Ender in Flight (2008) The Gold Bug (2007)	Ender in Exile (2008) Ender in Exile (2011) Gold Bug (2010)
Governor Wiggin (2017)
Investment Counselor (1999)
Speaker for the Dead (2011) Gloriously Bright (1991)	The Speaker Trilogy Speaker for the Dead (1986) Xenocide (1991) Children of the Mind (1996)

War of Gifts (2010) Mazer in Prison Recruiting Valentine The League War War of Gifts
The Polish Boy (2002)
Teacher's Pest (2003)
Ender's Stocking (2007) A War of Gifts (2007) War of Gifts (2009)
Fleet School (Note: Title is also mentioned in regard to a possible sequel for the film.) Children of the Fleet (2017)... (TBC)
Renegat (2017)

One year after the Buggers (Formics) were defeated and the Battle School children have returned to Earth, Ender is still unable to return with them because there would be wars over which country would keep Ender to use for its own ends. Ender is offered the governorship of the first human colony to be planted on one of the Buggers' former worlds, a planet that will eventually become known as Shakespeare. His sister Valentine decides to accompany Ender on his journey because she is sick of being controlled by her older brother, Peter, and because she wants to restore the relationship with Ender that she had lost when he left to go to Battle School.

On their way to the Shakespeare colony, Valentine begins writing her History of the Bugger Wars books while Ender has an unspoken power struggle with the captain of the ship, Admiral Quincy Morgan. There is also a romance between Ender and a girl named Alessandra. Once the ship lands on Shakespeare, Ender, who had spent much of his trip learning the names and lives of the colony's residents, takes charge of the colony and wins the colonists over.

Ender serves as governor of Shakespeare for a few years. Near the end of his time as governor, Ender and a young boy from the colony named Abra go to find a site for a new shipment of colonists. Ender wants the new settlement to be far enough away from the other settlements that there will not be competition between them right away, and so they can develop separately.

In the process of finding a location for the new settlement, Ender stumbles upon what seems to be the equivalent of a note from the Buggers. It is a structure made to look like a game he used to play in Battle School. When Ender investigates, he finds the living pupa of a Bugger Hive Queen that is fertilized and prepared to make hundreds of thousands of offspring upon its maturation.

The find leads Ender to write his first book as the Speaker for the Dead. The book, titled The Hive Queen, tries to look at the Bugger wars and their eventual destruction from the point of view of the Buggers. Later, Peter Wiggin, nearing the end of his life and knowing that Ender wrote the story, asks him to write one for him for when he dies. This book becomes known as The Hegemon.

After this, Ender resigns as governor and leaves the colony for another called Ganges. The leader of Ganges is Virlomi. Here he encounters Randall Firth, who believes himself to be the son of Achilles de Flandres, and even refers to himself by the name Achilles.

Randall spreads propaganda accusing Ender of xenocide in an attempt to discredit Virlomi and get revenge against Peter Wiggin, who he believes is responsible for his father's defeat. Randall tries twice to meet with Ender and discredit him somehow. On the second visit, his plan is to cleverly provoke Ender into killing him so that people will see how violent and dangerous he is, but Ender does not attack.

Instead Ender tries to convince Randall that he is not Achilles' son, but that he is in fact the son of Bean and Petra; hence where he gets his gigantism from. Eventually, Ender manages to convince Randall of his parents' identity by allowing Randall to brutally defeat him in a one-sided fistfight, the entire time asserting that he could never hurt his friends' child. Randall ends up changing his name to Arkanian Delphiki amidst his guilt for Ender's horrifying wounds.

After Ender heals a bit, he, Valentine, and the Hive Queen pupa board a starship to go to a new place.

== Original publication as short stories ==
Several of the chapters of the novel were originally published in electronic form as short stories in Card's webzine Intergalactic Medicine Show :

- The story "Ender's Homecoming" comprises the entire first chapter of the book. Aside from the email message at the end being placed at the beginning of chapter 2, the chapter is unchanged from the original short story. It was originally published in the January 2008 issue of Intergalactic Medicine Show.
- "A Young Man with Prospects" comprises the entire fifth chapter with an added email at the very beginning, describing how the Toscanos were selected to go to the colony, which wasn't in the original short story. The story was originally published in electronic form in the February 2007 issue of Intergalactic Medicine Show.
- The story "Ender in Flight" was originally published in the April 2008 issue of Intergalactic Medicine Show. It is very spread out throughout the book, and the email from Admiral Chamrajnagar to Admiral Quincy Morgan is included in the book. It spans from the end of chapter 7 through the end of chapter 10, continues in chapters 13 and 14, and finishes in chapter 16.
- "The Gold Bug" was published in the July 2007 issue of Intergalactic Medicine Show and reprinted in 2011 in the anthology Alien Contact. It was also adapted into an Ender comic and can be found as an added bonus in the Marvel Comics hardcover edition of Red Prophet: The Tales Of Alvin Maker. Parts of the story "The Gold Bug" occur in chapters 14, 15, and 16 of the book; some parts aren't included in the book, including a big part of the beginning of the short story.

=== Relationship between "Gold Bug" and "A Young Man with Prospects" ===
According to Card while he was writing the short story "The Gold Bug," he started to think about how Ender got to the colony. As a result, he came up with a story idea which involved a power struggle between Ender and the ship's captain. However, since Card did not want the story to be only about Ender and the captain he decided to put a mother and daughter on the ship. When he first began writing about Alessandra and Dorabella Toscano, it was supposed to have been the opening for that story, but as he sat down to plan the scenes, they developed into a story of their own, which became the short story "A Young Man with Prospects," published in February 2007 and later incorporated into the novel as chapter 5.

== Characters ==
- Andrew "Ender" Wiggin
- Valentine Wiggin - Ender's older sister, also known as "Demosthenes"
- Peter Wiggin - Ender's older brother, Hegemon of the Free People of Earth, also known as "Locke"
- John Paul Wiggin - Ender's father
- Theresa Wiggin - Ender's mother
- Hyrum Graff - Minister of Colonization
- Mazer Rackham - Ender's mentor
- Petra Arkanian - Battle School graduate, wife of Julian Delphiki, (Bean.)
- Virlomi - Battle School graduate, Governor of Ganges colony
- Alessandra Toscano - a young woman and Ender's friend
- Dorabella Toscano - Alessandra's mother
- Admiral Quincy Morgan - captain of the spaceship which brings colonists and supplies to Shakespeare
- Vitaly Denisovitch Kolmogorov - original Governor of Shakespeare colony
- Sel Menach - Chief xenobiologist and later Acting Governor of Shakespeare
- Ix Tolo - Xenobiologist on Shakespeare colony
- Po - Ix's older son
- Abra - Ix's younger son
- Arkanian Delphiki - also known as Randall Firth or Achilles, son of Petra Arkanian and Julian Delphiki ("Bean")

== See also ==
- List of Ender's Game characters
- Orson Scott Card bibliography
