= Speaker for the Dead =

1986 novel by Orson Scott Card

- Cover of first edition (hardcover)
- Author: Orson Scott Card
- Cover artist: John Harris
- Language: English
- Series: Ender's Game series
- Genre: Science fiction
- Publisher: Tor Books
- Publication date: March 1986
- Publication place: United States
- Pages: 415
- Award: Locus Award for Best Science Fiction Novel (1987)
- ISBN: 0-312-93738-5
- OCLC: 13201341
- Preceded by: Ender's Game
- Followed by: Xenocide

Speaker for the Dead is a 1986 science fiction novel by American writer Orson Scott Card, a sequel to the 1985 novel Ender's Game. The book takes place around the year 5270, some 3,000 years after the events in Ender's Game. However, because of relativistic space travel at near-light speed, Ender himself is only about 35 years old.

This is the first book to describe the Starways Congress, a high standpoint legislature for the human space colonies, and the Hundred Worlds, the planets with human colonies that are tightly intertwined by Ansible technology, which enables instantaneous communication across any distance.

Like Ender's Game, the book won the Nebula Award (1986) and the Hugo Award (1987). Speaker for the Dead was published in a slightly revised edition in 1991. It was followed by Xenocide and Children of the Mind.

== Setting ==
3,000 years after the eradication of the Formic species (in Ender's Game), Ender Wiggin writes a book called The Hive Queen, describing the life of the Formics as described to him by the dormant Formic Queen whom he secretly carries. As humanity uses light-speed travel to establish new colonies, Ender and his sister Valentine age slowly through relativistic travel. Ender's older brother, the now-aged Hegemon of Earth, Peter Wiggin, recognizes Ender's writings in The Hive Queen, and requests Ender write for him once he dies. Ender agrees and authors The Hegemon. These two books, written under the pseudonym "Speaker for the Dead", launch a new spiritual movement of Speakers for the Dead, who have authority to investigate and eulogize a person and their work after their death. The Hive Queen also shifts societal opinion about the Formic war, leading humanity to view Ender Wiggin, previously a hero, as responsible for a tragic and cruel xenocide. ('Xeno-', meaning alien, and '-cide', referring to the act of killing, together mean the act of killing populations of aliens - comparable to genocide.)

Three thousand years after the Formic xenocide, humans have spread across the Hundred Worlds, ruled by Starways Congress. A Brazilian Catholic human colony called Milagre is established on the planet Lusitania (1886 S.C.). The planet is home to a sentient species of symbiotic forest dwellers. The colonists (who primarily speak Portuguese) dub them "Pequeninos" (Little Ones) but they are often referred to as "piggies" due to their porcine snouts. Their society is matriarchal and gender-segregated, and their belief system centers around the trees of the forests. The Pequeninos prove to be of great interest to scientists. Since humans had destroyed the only sentient species they had encountered (the Formics), special care is taken to ensure no similar mistakes are made with the Pequeninos. The human colony is fenced in, strictly regulated to limit contact with the Pequeninos to a handful of scientists, and forbidden to share human technology or culture with them.

Shortly after the colony's founding, many of the colonists die from the Descolada virus (Portuguese for "uncoiled"), which alters DNA and causes terrible pain, rampant cancerous growth of fungus and even extra limbs, decay of healthy tissue, and death. The xenobiologists Gusto and Cida von Hesse manage to create a treatment for the virus before succumbing to it themselves (1936 S.C.), leaving behind their young daughter Novinha.

== Plot ==
Chart

Short Stories	Novels	Comics	Audioplay	Film

First Meetings (in the Enderverse) (2002 (2003)) Ender's Game Investment Counselor The Polish Boy Teacher's Pest
OSCs InterGalactic; Medicine Show (2008) Mazer in Prison Cheater Pretty Boy A Young Man with Prospects
Cheater (2006)
Ender's Shadow (1999) (Note: The events of Ender's Game, Ender's Shadow and A War of Gifts take place in roughly the same time period. The events of A War of Gifts only take place during the time at Battle School).) Ender's Shadow: Battle School (2009) Command School (2010) Ultimate collection (2012)
The Shadow Trilogy (Note: The events of Ender in Exile and the Shadow Trilogy take place in roughly the same time period.: First part of Ender in Exile (2/3) takes place during the Shadow Trilogy.; Last part of Ender in Exile (1/3) takes places after Shadow of the Giant.) (Note: Note on the following (maybe not yet so common) Trilogies: "Speaker Trilogy": Original set of sequels to Ender's Game, also referred to as: "Ender Quartet" (Ender's Game combined with "Speaker Trilogy"), also referred to as: "Ender Quintet" ("Ender Quartet" combined with Ender in Exile).; "Shadow Trilogy": Original set of sequels to Ender's Shadow, also referred to as: "Bean Quartet"/"Shadow Quartet" (Ender's Shadow combined with "Shadow Trilogy"), also referred to as: "Bean Quintet"/"Shadow Quintet" ("Bean Quartet" combined with Shadows in Flight), could be referred to as: "Bean Sextet"/"Shadow Sextet" ("Bean Quintet" combined with The Last Shadow)) Shadow of the Hegemon (2001) Shadow Puppets (2002) Shadow of the Giant (2005)
Shadows in Flight (2012)
Messenger (2018)
The Last Shadow (2021)

Formic Wars: Burning Earth (2011) Formic Wars: Silent Strike (2012)	First Formic; War Trilogy Earth Unaware (2012) Earth Afire (2013) Earth Awakens (2014)
Second Formic; War Trilogy The Swarm (2016) The Hive (2019) The Queens (TBA)
Mazer in Prison (2005)	Mazer in Prison (2010)
Pretty Boy (2006)
Ender's Game; Alive (2013) Recruiting Valentine (2009) The League War (2010)	Ender's Game (1977) Ender's Game (1985) Ender's Game: Battle School (2009) Command School (2010) Ultimate collection (2012) Ender's Game (2013)
Ender's Homecoming (2008) A Young Man with Prospects (2007) Ender in Flight (2008) The Gold Bug (2007)	Ender in Exile (2008) Ender in Exile (2011) Gold Bug (2010)
Governor Wiggin (2017)
Investment Counselor (1999)
Speaker for the Dead (2011) Gloriously Bright (1991)	The Speaker Trilogy Speaker for the Dead (1986) Xenocide (1991) Children of the Mind (1996)

War of Gifts (2010) Mazer in Prison Recruiting Valentine The League War War of Gifts
The Polish Boy (2002)
Teacher's Pest (2003)
Ender's Stocking (2007) A War of Gifts (2007) War of Gifts (2009)
Fleet School (Note: Title is also mentioned in regard to a possible sequel for the film.) Children of the Fleet (2017)... (TBC)
Renegat (2017)

Eight years after the Descolada virus has been brought under control, Xenologer Pipo and his thirteen-year-old son and apprentice Libo have developed a friendship with the Pequeninos. They allow Novinha to join their science team as the colony's only xenobiologist after she passes the test at age thirteen. After accidentally sharing information about human genders with a male Pequenino named Rooter, the scientists find Rooter's body eviscerated with a sapling planted within it. Guessing this may be a torturous sacrificial ritual, restrictions on studying the Pequeninos are enforced, barring the humans from asking questions directly to Pequeninos.

A few years later, Novinha discovers that every lifeform on Lusitania carries the Descolada virus which, though lethal to humans, appears to serve a beneficial purpose to native lifeforms. When Pipo learns of this, he suddenly has an insight, and before he tells the others, races off to talk to the Pequeninos. Libo and Novinha find Pipo's body cut open just as Rooter's had been, but with no sapling planted. As Pipo's death appears unprovoked, the Pequeninos are now considered a threat by the Starways Congress and restrictions on studying them are tightened. Distraught, Novinha makes a call for a Speaker for the Dead for Pipo. She is in love with Libo but fears that if he sees her files of research he will make the same discovery as Pipo and meet the same fate. She marries another colonist, Marcos Ribeira, so as to lock her files from being opened.

Andrew Wiggin, unbeknownst by others to be the Ender Wiggin responsible for the Formic xenocide, lives innocuously on the planet Trondheim. He responds to Novinha's call, parting with his sister, Valentine, who had traveled with him but is now settled with a family. He travels with an artificial intelligence named Jane who communicates with Ender through a jewel earring; she was born in the Ansible network that enables faster-than-light communications and keeps her existence secret. After relativistic travel, Ender arrives at Lusitania 22 years later (1970 S.C.), finding that Novinha canceled her request for a Speaker five days after sending it. In the intervening time, Libo died in the same manner as Pipo, and Marcos succumbed to a chronic illness. Novinha's eldest children, Ela and Miro, have requested a Speaker for Libo and Marcos. Ender, gaining access to all of the appropriate files, learns of tension since Pipo's death: Novinha has turned away from xenobiology to study crop growth and had a loveless abusive relationship with Marcos; Miro has secretly worked with Libo's daughter Ouanda to continue to study the Pequeninos, breaking the law to share human technology and knowledge with them. Miro and Ouanda have fallen in love. With Ender's arrival, Miro tells him that one of the Pequeninos, Human, has taken a great interest in Ender, and Ender becomes aware that Human can hear messages from the Formic Hive Queen. Ender discovers that Marcos was infertile: all six of Novinha's children were fathered by Libo. Ender also learns what Pipo had seen in Novinha's data.

As word of Miro's and Ouanda's illegal sharing of human technology with the Pequeninos is reported to Congress, Ender secretly meets with the Pequeninos. They know his true identity and they implore him to help them be part of civilization, while the Formic Queen tells Ender that Lusitania would be an ideal place to restart the hive, as her race can help guide the Pequeninos. Congress orders Miro and Ouanda to be sent off-planet for penal action and the colony be disbanded. Ender delivers his eulogy for Marcos, revealing Novinha's infidelity. Miro, distraught to learn that he is Ouanda's half-brother, attempts to escape to the Pequeninos, but he suffers neurological damage after he tries to cross the electrified fence. Ender reveals to the colony what Pipo learned: every life form on Lusitania is paired with another through the Descolada virus, so that the death of one births the other. In the case of the Pequeninos, they become trees when they die. The colony leaders agree to rebel against Congress, severing their Ansible connection and deactivating the fence, allowing Ender, Ouanda, and Ela to go with Human to speak to the Pequenino wives, to help establish a case to present to Congress.

The Pequenino wives help Ender corroborate the complex life cycle of the Pequeninos, affirming that the death ritual Pipo observed was to help create "fathertrees" who fertilize the Pequenino females to continue their race. The Pequeninos believed they were honoring Pipo, and later Libo, by helping them become fathertrees, but Ender explains that humans lack this "third life", and if the Pequeninos are to cohabitate with humans, they must respect this difference. To affirm their understanding and agreement, Ender is asked to perform the ritual of giving Human "third life" as a fathertree.

Miro recovers from most of the physical damage from his encounter with the fence, but he is partially paralyzed; Ender transfers Jane to him, and she becomes Miro's companion. Valentine and her family decide to travel from Trondheim to Lusitania to help with the revolt and will arrive in some decades due to relativistic travel; Ender sends Miro to meet them halfway. Novinha finally absolves herself of her guilt for the death of Pipo and Libo. She and Ender marry. Ender plants the Hive Queen as per her request, and he writes his third book, a biography of the life of the Pequenino Human.

== Film adaptation ==
At the Los Angeles Times Book Festival on April 20, 2013, Card stated that he did not want Speaker for the Dead to be made into a film: "Speaker for the Dead is unfilmable," Card said in response to a question from the audience. "It consists of talking heads, interrupted by moments of excruciating and unwatchable violence. Now, I admit, there's plenty of unwatchable violence in film, but never attached to my name. Speaker for the Dead, I don't want it to be filmed. I can't imagine it being filmed."

== Influence ==
Card wrote in his introduction to the 1991 edition that he had received letters from readers who conducted "Speakings" at funerals.

== Reception ==
David Langford reviewed Speaker for the Dead for White Dwarf #91, and stated that "Despite token guilt at his genocide of the sensitively named alien 'buggers;' (previous book), Ender never suffers for his triumphs—even though Card is strong on suffering for everyone else, and happily cripples a young boy to add needless excitement to the finale. I was impressed by this thoughtful SF adventure, but with reservations ..." AudioFile reviewed the book as "giving life to the emotional and intellectual challenge of the story" and described it as "brilliant and compelling". Publishers Weekly described it as a "rich and ambitious novel" but "overlong".

=== Awards ===
- Nebula Award winner, 1986
- Hugo Award winner, 1987
- Locus Award winner, 1987
- John W. Campbell Memorial Award nominee, 1987
- Kurd-Laßwitz-Preis winner, 1989

== See also ==
- List of Ender's Game characters
- Orson Scott Card bibliography
