= Earth Awakens =

2014 novel by Orson Scott Card and Aaron Johnston

- Author: Orson Scott Card and Aaron Johnston
- Cover artist: John Harris
- Language: English
- Series: Ender's Game series
- Genre: Science fiction
- Publisher: Tor Books
- Publication date: June 10, 2014
- Publication place: United States
- Media type: Print (Hardcover)
- Pages: 384 (Hardcover)
- ISBN: 0-7653-2906-9
- OCLC: 857863261
- Preceded by: Earth Afire
- Followed by: The Swarm

Chart

| Short Stories | Novels | Comics | Audioplay | Film |

First Meetings (in the Enderverse) (2002 (2003)) Ender's Game Investment Counselor The Polish Boy Teacher's Pest
OSCs InterGalactic; Medicine Show (2008) Mazer in Prison Cheater Pretty Boy A Young Man with Prospects
Cheater (2006)
Ender's Shadow (1999) (Note: The events of Ender's Game, Ender's Shadow and A War of Gifts take place in roughly the same time period. The events of A War of Gifts only take place during the time at Battle School).) Ender's Shadow: Battle School (2009) Command School (2010) Ultimate collection (2012)
The Shadow Trilogy (Note: The events of Ender in Exile and the Shadow Trilogy take place in roughly the same time period.: First part of Ender in Exile (2/3) takes place during the Shadow Trilogy.; Last part of Ender in Exile (1/3) takes places after Shadow of the Giant.) (Note: Note on the following (maybe not yet so common) Trilogies: "Speaker Trilogy": Original set of sequels to Ender's Game, also referred to as: "Ender Quartet" (Ender's Game combined with "Speaker Trilogy"), also referred to as: "Ender Quintet" ("Ender Quartet" combined with Ender in Exile).; "Shadow Trilogy": Original set of sequels to Ender's Shadow, also referred to as: "Bean Quartet"/"Shadow Quartet" (Ender's Shadow combined with "Shadow Trilogy"), also referred to as: "Bean Quintet"/"Shadow Quintet" ("Bean Quartet" combined with Shadows in Flight), could be referred to as: "Bean Sextet"/"Shadow Sextet" ("Bean Quintet" combined with The Last Shadow)) Shadow of the Hegemon (2001) Shadow Puppets (2002) Shadow of the Giant (2005)
Shadows in Flight (2012)
Messenger (2018)
The Last Shadow (2021)

Formic Wars: Burning Earth (2011) Formic Wars: Silent Strike (2012) | First Formic; War Trilogy Earth Unaware (2012) Earth Afire (2013) Earth Awakens (2014)
Second Formic; War Trilogy The Swarm (2016) The Hive (2019) The Queens (TBA)
Mazer in Prison (2005) | Mazer in Prison (2010)
Pretty Boy (2006)
Ender's Game; Alive (2013) Recruiting Valentine (2009) The League War (2010) | Ender's Game (1977) Ender's Game (1985) Ender's Game: Battle School (2009) Command School (2010) Ultimate collection (2012) Ender's Game (2013)
Ender's Homecoming (2008) A Young Man with Prospects (2007) Ender in Flight (2008) The Gold Bug (2007) | Ender in Exile (2008) Ender in Exile (2011) Gold Bug (2010)
Governor Wiggin (2017)
Investment Counselor (1999)
Speaker for the Dead (2011) Gloriously Bright (1991) | The Speaker Trilogy Speaker for the Dead (1986) Xenocide (1991) Children of the Mind (1996)

War of Gifts (2010) Mazer in Prison Recruiting Valentine The League War War of Gifts
The Polish Boy (2002)
Teacher's Pest (2003)
Ender's Stocking (2007) A War of Gifts (2007) War of Gifts (2009)
Fleet School (Note: Title is also mentioned in regard to a possible sequel for the film.) Children of the Fleet (2017)... (TBC)
Renegat (2017)

Earth Awakens is a science fiction novel by American writers Orson Scott Card and Aaron Johnston, and the third book of the First Formic Wars trilogy of novels in the Ender's Game series. It was released on June 10, 2014. It was nominated for the Goodreads Choice Award for science fiction.

== Plot ==
With an alien invasion in progress in China, humanity is divided on how to defend itself. The Chinese government is determined to go it alone, despite suffering catastrophic losses. Captain Wit O'Toole of the Mobile Operations Police (MOP) and Mazer Rackham have managed to destroy one of the three alien landers, but because they achieved the first significant human victory of the war without official approval and using a nuclear warhead obtained without authorization, they are in the custody of Chinese General Sima. During the invasion, Mazer Rackham saves Bingwen, a very intelligent eight-year-old Chinese boy who later devises a clever ploy to get them released: he spreads word over the internet that they were acting under Sima's orders and gives Sima full credit.

Meanwhile, Victor Delgado and Imala Bootstamp drift to the alien mothership in a ship disguised to avoid being destroyed. Victor manages to enter and explore the vessel. They survive a failed drone attack on the alien ship and, after getting away again, confront Lem Jukes, whom they suspect of involvement in the attack. Actually, it was launched by Lem's father, Ukko. Lem tried to stop or delay it.

Based on what he has learned, Victor devises a plan to capture it, and reluctantly accepts Lem's help in carrying it out. The MOPs, including Wit and Mazer, are recruited to become the rest of Victor's boarding party. Despite Victor's objections, Imala volunteers as well.

When the Formics detect the intruders, all of their forces on Earth leave to go to their ship's defense. Lem leads a force to hold them off, resulting in a fierce space battle. Aboard the Mothership, Wit has to sacrifice his life, exposing himself to quickly lethal levels of radiation, but Victor's plan succeeds, and the ship is captured intact. However, Victor's cousin, Edimar, backtracks the path of the alien ship and discovers that it was only a scout ship; the real Mothership is reconfiguring itself into a battle fleet that will arrive in about five years.

== See also ==
- The Formic Wars: Silent Strike
- List of Ender's Game characters
- Orson Scott Card bibliography
