= Earth Afire =

2013 novel by Orson Scott Card and Aaron Johnston

- Book cover, first edition, Hardback
- Author: Orson Scott Card and Aaron Johnston
- Language: English
- Series: Ender's Game series
- Genre: Science fiction
- Publisher: Tor Books
- Publication date: June 4, 2013
- Publication place: United States
- Media type: Print (Hardcover)
- Pages: 400 (Hardcover)
- ISBN: 0-7653-2905-0
- Preceded by: Earth Unaware
- Followed by: Earth Awakens

Chart

| Short Stories | Novels | Comics | Audioplay | Film |

First Meetings (in the Enderverse) (2002 (2003)) Ender's Game Investment Counselor The Polish Boy Teacher's Pest
OSCs InterGalactic; Medicine Show (2008) Mazer in Prison Cheater Pretty Boy A Young Man with Prospects
Cheater (2006)
Ender's Shadow (1999) (Note: The events of Ender's Game, Ender's Shadow and A War of Gifts take place in roughly the same time period. The events of A War of Gifts only take place during the time at Battle School).) Ender's Shadow: Battle School (2009) Command School (2010) Ultimate collection (2012)
The Shadow Trilogy (Note: The events of Ender in Exile and the Shadow Trilogy take place in roughly the same time period.: First part of Ender in Exile (2/3) takes place during the Shadow Trilogy.; Last part of Ender in Exile (1/3) takes places after Shadow of the Giant.) (Note: Note on the following (maybe not yet so common) Trilogies: "Speaker Trilogy": Original set of sequels to Ender's Game, also referred to as: "Ender Quartet" (Ender's Game combined with "Speaker Trilogy"), also referred to as: "Ender Quintet" ("Ender Quartet" combined with Ender in Exile).; "Shadow Trilogy": Original set of sequels to Ender's Shadow, also referred to as: "Bean Quartet"/"Shadow Quartet" (Ender's Shadow combined with "Shadow Trilogy"), also referred to as: "Bean Quintet"/"Shadow Quintet" ("Bean Quartet" combined with Shadows in Flight), could be referred to as: "Bean Sextet"/"Shadow Sextet" ("Bean Quintet" combined with The Last Shadow)) Shadow of the Hegemon (2001) Shadow Puppets (2002) Shadow of the Giant (2005)
Shadows in Flight (2012)
Messenger (2018)
The Last Shadow (2021)

Formic Wars: Burning Earth (2011) Formic Wars: Silent Strike (2012) | First Formic; War Trilogy Earth Unaware (2012) Earth Afire (2013) Earth Awakens (2014)
Second Formic; War Trilogy The Swarm (2016) The Hive (2019) The Queens (TBA)
Mazer in Prison (2005) | Mazer in Prison (2010)
Pretty Boy (2006)
Ender's Game; Alive (2013) Recruiting Valentine (2009) The League War (2010) | Ender's Game (1977) Ender's Game (1985) Ender's Game: Battle School (2009) Command School (2010) Ultimate collection (2012) Ender's Game (2013)
Ender's Homecoming (2008) A Young Man with Prospects (2007) Ender in Flight (2008) The Gold Bug (2007) | Ender in Exile (2008) Ender in Exile (2011) Gold Bug (2010)
Governor Wiggin (2017)
Investment Counselor (1999)
Speaker for the Dead (2011) Gloriously Bright (1991) | The Speaker Trilogy Speaker for the Dead (1986) Xenocide (1991) Children of the Mind (1996)

War of Gifts (2010) Mazer in Prison Recruiting Valentine The League War War of Gifts
The Polish Boy (2002)
Teacher's Pest (2003)
Ender's Stocking (2007) A War of Gifts (2007) War of Gifts (2009)
Fleet School (Note: Title is also mentioned in regard to a possible sequel for the film.) Children of the Fleet (2017)... (TBC)
Renegat (2017)

Earth Afire is a science fiction novel by American writers Orson Scott Card and Aaron Johnston, and the second book of the Formic Wars novels in the Ender's Game series. It was nominated for the Goodreads Choice Award for science fiction.

== Plot ==
A century before the events of Ender's Game, an alien spaceship enters the Solar System and soon makes known its hostile intentions by destroying harmless human ships. Then, it wipes out a ragtag fleet of asteroid miners who have banded together in a desperate attempt to stop it. All of the adult male members of Victor Delgado's extended clan die in the battle. The survivors are unable to transmit a warning, so Victor volunteers for a near-suicidal mission to try to reach Earth in a tiny, hastily converted unmanned cargo ship. He makes it to the Moon, but is unable to get the authorities to take him seriously. Thus, humanity is totally unprepared when the First Formic War starts.

The invading spaceship sends three enormous landing craft to southeast China. The Formics emerge and use gas to defoliate the surrounding areas. Despite suffering large loss of life, the Chinese government refuses outside help.

Before the landing, Mazer Rackham had been training the Chinese military on a new transport aircraft, the HERC. During the Formic invasion, he saves Bingwen, an extremely intelligent eight-year-old Chinese boy before his craft is shot down. Bingwen and Mazer then set off to destroy the nearest Formic lander.

The Mobile Operations Police (MOP), a small but elite international force, enters China without authorization. MOP Captain Wit O'Toole obtains a tactical nuclear weapon from anonymous Chinese officials who do not agree with their government's stance on foreign assistance. They destroy the lander, but then Captain Shenzu arrives and places Mazer under arrest.

Meanwhile, Victor and Imala (a Customs Agent assigned to Victor upon his unauthorized arrival) manage to drift close to the Formic ship, using a disguised ship provided by Lem Jukes (the only son of the richest man alive) to avoid being destroyed. Victor breaks into the alien ship through a gun port.

== Characters ==
- Victor Delgado, a young mechanic of great talent who, along with his father and a young apprentice, keeps the family mining ship El Cavador running
- Rena Delgado, Victor's mother
- Lem Jukes, son of mining magnate Ukko Jukes and captain of the Makarhu, a corporate mining vessel
- Captain DeWitt Clinton O'Toole, commander of the Mobile Operations Police (MOPs)
- Lieutenant Mazer Rackham, a Maori soldier whom O'Toole is interested in recruiting
- Bingwen, a young child whose parents and grandfather are killed in the Formic invasion
- Ukko Jukes, Lem Jukes' father
- Imala Bootstamp, Victor's Luna Trade Department representative and auditor
- Captain Shenzu, a Chinese military officer

== See also ==
- List of Ender's Game characters
- Orson Scott Card bibliography
