= Shadow of the Hegemon =

2000 novel by Orson Scott Card

- First edition, Hardcover
- Author: Orson Scott Card
- Cover artist: Lisa Flakenstern
- Language: English
- Series: Ender's Game series
- Genre: Science fiction
- Publisher: Tor Books
- Publication date: 10 December 2000
- Publication place: United States
- Media type: Print (hardback & paperback)
- Pages: 365
- ISBN: 0-312-87651-3
- OCLC: 44046723
- Dewey Decimal: 813/.54 21
- LC Class: PS3553.A655 S525 2001
- Preceded by: Ender's Shadow
- Followed by: Shadow Puppets

Shadow of the Hegemon (2000) is a science fiction novel by American writer Orson Scott Card, the second novel in the Ender's Shadow series (often called the Bean Quartet). It is also the sixth novel in the Ender's Game series. It is told mostly from the point of view of Bean, a largely peripheral character in the original novel Ender's Game but the central protagonist of the parallel narrative Ender's Shadow. Shadow of the Hegemon was nominated for a Locus Award in 2002.

== Plot summary ==
Chart

Short Stories	Novels	Comics	Audioplay	Film

First Meetings (in the Enderverse) (2002 (2003)) Ender's Game Investment Counselor The Polish Boy Teacher's Pest
OSCs InterGalactic; Medicine Show (2008) Mazer in Prison Cheater Pretty Boy A Young Man with Prospects
Cheater (2006)
Ender's Shadow (1999) (Note: The events of Ender's Game, Ender's Shadow and A War of Gifts take place in roughly the same time period. The events of A War of Gifts only take place during the time at Battle School).) Ender's Shadow: Battle School (2009) Command School (2010) Ultimate collection (2012)
The Shadow Trilogy (Note: The events of Ender in Exile and the Shadow Trilogy take place in roughly the same time period.: First part of Ender in Exile (2/3) takes place during the Shadow Trilogy.; Last part of Ender in Exile (1/3) takes places after Shadow of the Giant.) (Note: Note on the following (maybe not yet so common) Trilogies: "Speaker Trilogy": Original set of sequels to Ender's Game, also referred to as: "Ender Quartet" (Ender's Game combined with "Speaker Trilogy"), also referred to as: "Ender Quintet" ("Ender Quartet" combined with Ender in Exile).; "Shadow Trilogy": Original set of sequels to Ender's Shadow, also referred to as: "Bean Quartet"/"Shadow Quartet" (Ender's Shadow combined with "Shadow Trilogy"), also referred to as: "Bean Quintet"/"Shadow Quintet" ("Bean Quartet" combined with Shadows in Flight), could be referred to as: "Bean Sextet"/"Shadow Sextet" ("Bean Quintet" combined with The Last Shadow)) Shadow of the Hegemon (2001) Shadow Puppets (2002) Shadow of the Giant (2005)
Shadows in Flight (2012)
Messenger (2018)
The Last Shadow (2021)

Formic Wars: Burning Earth (2011) Formic Wars: Silent Strike (2012)	First Formic; War Trilogy Earth Unaware (2012) Earth Afire (2013) Earth Awakens (2014)
Second Formic; War Trilogy The Swarm (2016) The Hive (2019) The Queens (TBA)
Mazer in Prison (2005)	Mazer in Prison (2010)
Pretty Boy (2006)
Ender's Game; Alive (2013) Recruiting Valentine (2009) The League War (2010)	Ender's Game (1977) Ender's Game (1985) Ender's Game: Battle School (2009) Command School (2010) Ultimate collection (2012) Ender's Game (2013)
Ender's Homecoming (2008) A Young Man with Prospects (2007) Ender in Flight (2008) The Gold Bug (2007)	Ender in Exile (2008) Ender in Exile (2011) Gold Bug (2010)
Governor Wiggin (2017)
Investment Counselor (1999)
Speaker for the Dead (2011) Gloriously Bright (1991)	The Speaker Trilogy Speaker for the Dead (1986) Xenocide (1991) Children of the Mind (1996)

War of Gifts (2010) Mazer in Prison Recruiting Valentine The League War War of Gifts
The Polish Boy (2002)
Teacher's Pest (2003)
Ender's Stocking (2007) A War of Gifts (2007) War of Gifts (2009)
Fleet School (Note: Title is also mentioned in regard to a possible sequel for the film.) Children of the Fleet (2017)... (TBC)
Renegat (2017)

In Shadow of the Hegemon, all of the Battle School graduates, except Ender, return to Earth in A.D. 2197, where Ender's brother Peter, using his online pseudonym Locke, arranges for Ender to be returned to Earth; but Valentine, under the pseudonym Demosthenes, uses Peter's violent past against him to keep Ender exiled. Shortly after their return, the members of the unit Ender commanded (called his Jeesh, an Arabic word meaning 'army'), with the exception of Bean, are seized as strategists in an upcoming struggle for world dominance, by Achilles de Flandres (ah-SHEEL), who subjects them to solitary confinement. Bean having imprisoned Achilles in the previous novel, Achilles attempts (unsuccessfully) to kill Bean. The Delphikis go into hiding, while Bean joins forces with Sister Carlotta. After he discovers an encoded message sent by Petra confirming that the Russians are Achilles' backers, he works to free her and the others, while helping Peter come to power.

When Peter publishes under the 'Locke' pseudonym that Achilles is a murderer, the Battle School graduates are released, excepting Petra, whom Achilles brings to India. From there, he requests plans for an invasion of Burma and then Thailand, for which Indian Battle School graduates, including Sayagi and Virlomi, develop plans for brute-force attacks involving long supply lines. Petra arranges a different plan of stripping India's garrisons along the Indo-Pakistani border, which she expects will never happen, until a meeting with Pakistan's prime minister, in which Achilles encourages the two nations to make peace among themselves and declare war on other neighbors; secretly giving China the opportunity to annihilate the Indian army.

Petra finds an ally in Virlomi, who reveals to Bean that Petra is a prisoner, and eventually escapes the military compound to bring rescue. Courtesy of Bean's and Sister Carlotta's assets, "Locke" is nominated publicly for the position of Hegemon, allowing Peter to unmask himself. Meanwhile, Bean enters the Thai military under the patronage of Suriyawong (Suri), a fellow Battle School graduate and (nominal) head of Thailand's planning division, and trains 200 Thai soldiers against India. When the Thai Commander-in-Chief betrays Suriyawong and Bean, Bean hides himself and Suri in the barracks of his troops, and sends word for rescue, while Thailand prepares for war. Sister Carlotta's airplane, en route to Bean's location, is destroyed by a Chinese SAM, and Bean receives an earlier-recorded message, in which she describes the relationship between Anton's Key and Bean's brilliance, but also informs him that his life expectancy will be drastically reduced as a result.

Bean and Suriyawong use the troops Bean has trained to halt Indian supply lines. While striking a bridge, they meet Virlomi, who defects to their side. With the aid of Bean's soldiers and Locke's distinguished connections, they move on Hyderabad, where Bean rescues Petra. Furthermore, "Locke" publishes an essay detailing the Chinese betrayal just as it is happening, and on the basis of this prescience (and other miracles over the years) Peter Wiggin is elected Hegemon over the world.

== Characters ==
- Julian "Bean" Delphiki
- Petra Arkanian
- Achilles de Flandres
- Sister Carlotta
- Peter Wiggin
- Hyrum Graff
- Suriyawong
- Virlomi
- John Paul Wiggin
- Theresa Wiggin

== History ==
Card accredits two books in particular as being profoundly influential in the writing of this novel: Thailand: A Short History by David K. Wyatt and Raj: The Making and Unmaking of British India by Lawrence James. In addition to these two books he was also inspired by Phillip Absher, who was one of the readers of the first draft. Phillip suggested that the Petra arc of the novel was anticlimactic. Upon hearing this criticism, Card rethought this entire book and decided to split it into two books. At the time of publication, Card thought the Bean series (Shadow series) of the Enderverse would only be four books long.

== See also ==
- List of Ender's Game characters
- Orson Scott Card bibliography
- Insignia trilogy - science-fiction series featuring both young recruits training in space and similar geopolitics
