= Shadow of the Giant =

2005 novel by Orson Scott Card

- Front cover
- Author: Orson Scott Card
- Cover artist: Bob Warner
- Language: English
- Series: Ender's Game series
- Genre: Science fiction
- Publisher: Tor Books
- Publication date: March 1, 2005
- Publication place: United States
- Media type: Print (hardback & paperback)
- Pages: 368
- ISBN: 0-312-85758-6
- OCLC: 57429685
- Dewey Decimal: 813/.54 22
- LC Class: PS3553.A655 S524 2005
- Preceded by: Shadow Puppets
- Followed by: Ender in Exile; Shadows in Flight

Shadow of the Giant (2005) is a science fiction novel by American writer Orson Scott Card, the fourth novel in his Ender's Shadow series, also called the Bean Quartet.

== Plot summary ==
Chart

Short Stories	Novels	Comics	Audioplay	Film

First Meetings (in the Enderverse) (2002 (2003)) Ender's Game Investment Counselor The Polish Boy Teacher's Pest
OSCs InterGalactic; Medicine Show (2008) Mazer in Prison Cheater Pretty Boy A Young Man with Prospects
Cheater (2006)
Ender's Shadow (1999) (Note: The events of Ender's Game, Ender's Shadow and A War of Gifts take place in roughly the same time period. The events of A War of Gifts only take place during the time at Battle School).) Ender's Shadow: Battle School (2009) Command School (2010) Ultimate collection (2012)
The Shadow Trilogy (Note: The events of Ender in Exile and the Shadow Trilogy take place in roughly the same time period.: First part of Ender in Exile (2/3) takes place during the Shadow Trilogy.; Last part of Ender in Exile (1/3) takes places after Shadow of the Giant.) (Note: Note on the following (maybe not yet so common) Trilogies: "Speaker Trilogy": Original set of sequels to Ender's Game, also referred to as: "Ender Quartet" (Ender's Game combined with "Speaker Trilogy"), also referred to as: "Ender Quintet" ("Ender Quartet" combined with Ender in Exile).; "Shadow Trilogy": Original set of sequels to Ender's Shadow, also referred to as: "Bean Quartet"/"Shadow Quartet" (Ender's Shadow combined with "Shadow Trilogy"), also referred to as: "Bean Quintet"/"Shadow Quintet" ("Bean Quartet" combined with Shadows in Flight), could be referred to as: "Bean Sextet"/"Shadow Sextet" ("Bean Quintet" combined with The Last Shadow)) Shadow of the Hegemon (2001) Shadow Puppets (2002) Shadow of the Giant (2005)
Shadows in Flight (2012)
Messenger (2018)
The Last Shadow (2021)

Formic Wars: Burning Earth (2011) Formic Wars: Silent Strike (2012)	First Formic; War Trilogy Earth Unaware (2012) Earth Afire (2013) Earth Awakens (2014)
Second Formic; War Trilogy The Swarm (2016) The Hive (2019) The Queens (TBA)
Mazer in Prison (2005)	Mazer in Prison (2010)
Pretty Boy (2006)
Ender's Game; Alive (2013) Recruiting Valentine (2009) The League War (2010)	Ender's Game (1977) Ender's Game (1985) Ender's Game: Battle School (2009) Command School (2010) Ultimate collection (2012) Ender's Game (2013)
Ender's Homecoming (2008) A Young Man with Prospects (2007) Ender in Flight (2008) The Gold Bug (2007)	Ender in Exile (2008) Ender in Exile (2011) Gold Bug (2010)
Governor Wiggin (2017)
Investment Counselor (1999)
Speaker for the Dead (2011) Gloriously Bright (1991)	The Speaker Trilogy Speaker for the Dead (1986) Xenocide (1991) Children of the Mind (1996)

War of Gifts (2010) Mazer in Prison Recruiting Valentine The League War War of Gifts
The Polish Boy (2002)
Teacher's Pest (2003)
Ender's Stocking (2007) A War of Gifts (2007) War of Gifts (2009)
Fleet School (Note: Title is also mentioned in regard to a possible sequel for the film.) Children of the Fleet (2017)... (TBC)
Renegat (2017)

A belief is spreading in conquered China that the government has lost the Mandate of Heaven. Han Tzu meets up with Mazer Rackham, who passes him a blow dart pen, calling it the "Mandate of Heaven". Han Tzu confronts the emperor, Snow Tiger, who is shot and killed by a guard, allowing Han Tzu to overthrow the Chinese government and install himself as the new emperor. Meanwhile, Peter Wiggin, Hegemon of Earth, along with Petra Arkanian, goes to visit Alai, Caliph of the Muslim League. The two help Alai realize that he is little more than a glorified prisoner, and that others have been ruling Islam in his stead. After uncovering a conspiracy against him, Alai resolves to take firmer control of his nation and guarantee the human rights of his subjugated peoples.

The rest of the book deals with Peter Wiggin working to create a world government free of war through his Free People of Earth (FPE) alliance. Caliph Alai of the Muslim League and Virlomi, now the virtual goddess of India, oppose his efforts. Against this backdrop of world political machinations by the former Battle School children is the extremely personal story of Julian (Bean) Delphiki. Anton's Key is making him grow at an astounding rate and he has only a short time before his body will become too large for his heart to support. He searches frantically for his and Petra's missing children. Graff assists them in locating the surrogate mothers of their children. While Bean and Petra wait for news, Graff extends invitations to the other members of Ender's Jeesh to leave Earth and rule colonies, where they can conquer to their heart's content without causing needless wars between themselves, and instructs Bean to support Peter in forming the FPE.

The FPE alliance begins with only twenty-two countries, among them Brazil, Rwanda, and the Netherlands. The first test of the FPE comes when they recognize the sovereignty and nationhood of the Nubian, Quechua, and Aymara peoples, ethnic minorities that are politically part of other nations. Peru and Sudan send troops against these "rebel" strongholds, but Peter defends them using Bean and Suriyawong, leading Rwandan and Thai troops, to show that war against one FPE member is war against all of them. The FPE's victories, and especially their militarily brilliant commanders, bolster support for the FPE, and nations begin to freely vote on whether to join it.

Meanwhile, Bean suspects that Peter is embezzling Ender's military pension to fund the FPE, so he requests that Ender's funds be placed under the control of an autonomous computer. Colonel Graff has the Mind Game reprogrammed to accurately predict financial markets and turns it loose over the ansible network, where it continues to invest Ender's pension and, as revealed later in the Enderverse chronology, eventually evolves into the artificial intelligence known as Jane. The Mind Game also speeds the search for Bean's missing children, allowing the International Fleet to find eight of them; two of whom have Anton's Key turned, as does the baby Petra is carrying. The ninth remains undetected, as Achilles had it implanted into a woman named Randi, brainwashed to think that it is the baby of Achilles, whom she worships as a hero assassinated by foul enemies. To avoid persecution, Randi determines to leave Earth and live in a colony, where she can raise her child (who appears to have Anton's Key turned, as the baby is born prematurely) to follow in Achilles' footsteps. Her story, and that of her child Randall Firth, is concluded in Card's later novel Ender in Exile.

Virlomi attempts to guarantee India's freedom via dynastic marriage, turning down an offer from Han Tzu to instead attempt to seduce Peter Wiggin. When Peter turns her down, she turns to Alai whom she finds easier to outmaneuver. Their new marriage is fraught with tension and Alai discovers that, despite his wife's status as an infidel and a woman, the more hotheaded members of his empire actually prefer her aggressive and expansionist policies. Virlomi then declares war on China, setting off all manner of plots: Muslim hardliners attempt to assassinate Alai; Russia invades China and eastern Europe using "contingency" plans drawn up by a horrified Vlad; and Fly Molo of the Philippines is instructed to invade Taiwan, his nation suicidally confident in their Jeesh member. In these different ways, all the Battle School grads are convinced to take up Graff's offer to travel the stars, realizing that their presence on Earth guarantees continued and wasteful war. Even Virlomi agrees, after Suri manages to snap her out of her growing megalomania.

With the secret help of Mazer Rackham, Bean divorces Petra for her own sake, takes the three found children with Anton's Key, and flies away on a starship provided by the Fleet to achieve relativistic speeds and thereby stay alive long enough for medical researchers to find a cure. Bean's departure breaks Petra's heart, but she becomes Peter's military commander, eventually marrying and having five children with him, though she never stops loving Bean. By the end of the novel, all of the world's nations, except the United States, have joined the FPE. Peter reconciles with Ender via ansible, giving the "Speaker for the Dead" all he needs to write The Hegemon, a deeply felt and truthful biography of his brother. Petra reads his biography at his grave, thinking of him as the man who truly changed her life. Still, Bean remains the one whom she loves and has changed her life the most.

== See also ==
- List of Ender's Game characters
- Orson Scott Card bibliography
