= Shadows in Flight =

2012 novel by Orson Scott Card

- First edition
- Author: Orson Scott Card
- Cover artist: John Harris
- Language: English
- Series: Ender's Game series
- Genre: Science fiction
- Publisher: Tor Books
- Publication date: January 17, 2012
- Publication place: United States
- ISBN: 0-7653-3200-0
- Preceded by: Shadow of the Giant
- Followed by: The Last Shadow

Shadows in Flight is a science fiction novella by American writer Orson Scott Card. When released in 2012, it became the twelfth book published in the Ender's Game series. The story follows on from where the original four "Shadow series" books left off. It is about Bean and his children discovering an ancient Formic "ark" during their journey in space. It was released in January 2012. It was nominated for the Goodreads Choice Award for science fiction.

== Plot ==
In 2210, the starship Herodotus left Earth. On board were Julian "Bean" Delphiki and his three infant children – Ender, Carlotta, and Cincinnatus – all of whom have Anton's Key turned. This genetic alteration, which Bean passed to his children, grants them all extremely high intelligence, but causes their bodies to grow uncontrollably, which is likely to kill them by the age of 20. Subjectively, they have been flying near light-speed for five years, but relativistic effects mean that 421 years have passed on Earth – the year is now 2631. When the family left, scientists were actively trying to find a cure for their giantism which would not diminish their intelligence. Several generations have passed, they have been forgotten, and their mother and "normal" siblings have died centuries ago. The children have only been alive for six subjective years. Bean's life has been extended by the low gravity on board the Herodotus, which allows his heart to keep beating despite his increasingly gigantic size. At 4.5 meters (15 ft) tall, Bean must remain prone in the cargo bay so as not to overexert himself. He controls and watches everything on the ship through his holo-top terminal, often prompting the children to have secret meetings they believe the Giant cannot hear. Bean and Ender continue to study their genetic condition in the hope of finding a cure.

In one of these meetings, the militarily-minded Cincinnatus (nicknamed "Sergeant") tries to enlist the aid of his siblings in killing their father, saying he is a drain on resources. The sensitive Carlotta (whose specialty is engineering) is unwilling to take a stance, but Ender (an expert biologist) punches Sergeant and breaks his nose for proposing such an idea, thus ending his brother's domination over the family. Ender and Carlotta tell Bean about Sergeant's plans, and Bean puts all three children in their place, reminding them they are each as intelligent as the other. Sergeant has been imagining threats to their security where there are none, because he believes the Giant means to pass his soldier role onto him. So he studies the Formic war vids, learning his father's strategy while training himself with weaponry. Ender takes on the bulk of the genetic studies by monitoring the advances made by the scientists on Earth. Carlotta, who feels slightly left behind with the genetic studies serves the family by taking care of every aspect of the spacecraft, since Bean himself is stuck in the cargo hold.

After despairing at the condition of their lives, and in the light of the discovery that their condition cannot be cured, Carlotta notices an unknown spacecraft in geosync orbit around an uncharted planet in the Goldilocks zone. Bean and his children deliberate courses of action. If they alter their course, they must slow down to turn, possibly killing Bean with the increased gravity. However, they cannot anticipate who or what is in the spacecraft; it may attack them, or they may be detrimental to the survival and progression of the human race. This hypothesis is solidified when Sergeant deduces that the ship is a Formic Ark, a colony ship that has been in flight for centuries.

Chart

Short Stories	Novels	Comics	Audioplay	Film

First Meetings (in the Enderverse) (2002 (2003)) Ender's Game Investment Counselor The Polish Boy Teacher's Pest
OSCs InterGalactic; Medicine Show (2008) Mazer in Prison Cheater Pretty Boy A Young Man with Prospects
Cheater (2006)
Ender's Shadow (1999) (Note: The events of Ender's Game, Ender's Shadow and A War of Gifts take place in roughly the same time period. The events of A War of Gifts only take place during the time at Battle School).) Ender's Shadow: Battle School (2009) Command School (2010) Ultimate collection (2012)
The Shadow Trilogy (Note: The events of Ender in Exile and the Shadow Trilogy take place in roughly the same time period.: First part of Ender in Exile (2/3) takes place during the Shadow Trilogy.; Last part of Ender in Exile (1/3) takes places after Shadow of the Giant.) (Note: Note on the following (maybe not yet so common) Trilogies: "Speaker Trilogy": Original set of sequels to Ender's Game, also referred to as: "Ender Quartet" (Ender's Game combined with "Speaker Trilogy"), also referred to as: "Ender Quintet" ("Ender Quartet" combined with Ender in Exile).; "Shadow Trilogy": Original set of sequels to Ender's Shadow, also referred to as: "Bean Quartet"/"Shadow Quartet" (Ender's Shadow combined with "Shadow Trilogy"), also referred to as: "Bean Quintet"/"Shadow Quintet" ("Bean Quartet" combined with Shadows in Flight), could be referred to as: "Bean Sextet"/"Shadow Sextet" ("Bean Quintet" combined with The Last Shadow)) Shadow of the Hegemon (2001) Shadow Puppets (2002) Shadow of the Giant (2005)
Shadows in Flight (2012)
Messenger (2018)
The Last Shadow (2021)

Formic Wars: Burning Earth (2011) Formic Wars: Silent Strike (2012)	First Formic; War Trilogy Earth Unaware (2012) Earth Afire (2013) Earth Awakens (2014)
Second Formic; War Trilogy The Swarm (2016) The Hive (2019) The Queens (TBA)
Mazer in Prison (2005)	Mazer in Prison (2010)
Pretty Boy (2006)
Ender's Game; Alive (2013) Recruiting Valentine (2009) The League War (2010)	Ender's Game (1977) Ender's Game (1985) Ender's Game: Battle School (2009) Command School (2010) Ultimate collection (2012) Ender's Game (2013)
Ender's Homecoming (2008) A Young Man with Prospects (2007) Ender in Flight (2008) The Gold Bug (2007)	Ender in Exile (2008) Ender in Exile (2011) Gold Bug (2010)
Governor Wiggin (2017)
Investment Counselor (1999)
Speaker for the Dead (2011) Gloriously Bright (1991)	The Speaker Trilogy Speaker for the Dead (1986) Xenocide (1991) Children of the Mind (1996)

War of Gifts (2010) Mazer in Prison Recruiting Valentine The League War War of Gifts
The Polish Boy (2002)
Teacher's Pest (2003)
Ender's Stocking (2007) A War of Gifts (2007) War of Gifts (2009)
Fleet School (Note: Title is also mentioned in regard to a possible sequel for the film.) Children of the Fleet (2017)... (TBC)
Renegat (2017)

Bean sends Sergeant alone to investigate the ship, and he escapes an attack by small Formic-like animals they call "rabs" (rats+crabs). After this initial encounter, Bean reveals his full plan to his children. They must find out who is piloting this ship and attempting to terraform the planet it orbits. It was Bean's intention all along to have his children live on this planet and found their new species in safety as soon as he picked it up on radar as lying within the Goldilocks zone. Armed with Sergeant's weapons and a sedative fog spray Ender devised, Sergeant commands defenses as Carlotta leads their group to the helm with Bean in contact the whole time. The spray proves effective, and they soon find the Hive Queen's chamber, finding her, and many workers, dead. Eventually they find living male Formics in one of the piloting helms.

In an attempt to communicate, Ender surrenders himself by drifting close to them in zero gravity. The male drones come close and communicate with Ender via mental images. The group learns that the Ark was sent long before Ender Wiggin, whom Bean's son is named for, wiped out the buggers. After the Queen on their ship died, the workers died without her link, yet the males lived and tried to survive and keep the ship running, despite losing numbers to the feral rabs. The group strikes a deal that if the children can wipe out the rabs, they can stay with the Formics and help cultivate the planet. When Bean learns from the male drones that Ender Wiggin is carrying a queen's cocoon looking for a home, and that Formic workers do have minds of their own contrary to popular belief, he demands to speak with the Formics in order to warn Ender, despite risking his life in the journey.

Accepting that his children have achieved beyond his wildest expectations, Bean risks his life by docking with the ark's cargo hold to float down into the ecotat. Lying in the grass and basking in the artificial sunlight, Bean communes for three days with the formic males. Though the Formics think it is silly to believe the Queen would hide anything from them, Bean learns that workers could rebel against a Queen and regain their free will. After Bean has slept for a while, his children wake him, informing him that by studying how the Hive Queen suppresses her workers, Ender has devised and administered a virus that will develop an organelle to shut off their growth genome, leaving their intelligence intact but saving them from the giantism half of Anton's Key.

With renewed hope for the future, Bean looks at the beauty around him and remembers all those whom he loved and who loved him in his life. With his children's help, he stands at four and a half meters for the first time in years, and walks with labored breathing in the sunlight. Happy for his children and for his own short but brilliant life, Bean lies down and dies in peace.

== See also ==
- The Last Shadow
- List of Ender's Game characters
- Orson Scott Card bibliography
