= Children of the Mind =

1996 novel by Orson Scott Card

- Author: Orson Scott Card
- Cover artist: John Harris
- Language: English
- Series: Ender's Game series
- Genre: Science fiction
- Publisher: Tor Books
- Publication date: August 1996
- Publication place: United States
- Media type: Print (Hardcover & Paperback)
- Pages: 349
- ISBN: 0-312-85395-5
- OCLC: 33971186
- Dewey Decimal: 813/.54 20
- LC Class: PS3553.A655 C48 1996
- Preceded by: Xenocide
- Followed by: A War of Gifts

Children of the Mind (1996) is a novel by American author Orson Scott Card, the fourth in his successful Ender's Game series of science fiction novels that focus on the character Ender Wiggin. This book was originally the second half of Xenocide, before it was split into two novels.

== Plot summary ==
Chart

Short Stories	Novels	Comics	Audioplay	Film

First Meetings (in the Enderverse) (2002 (2003)) Ender's Game Investment Counselor The Polish Boy Teacher's Pest
OSCs InterGalactic; Medicine Show (2008) Mazer in Prison Cheater Pretty Boy A Young Man with Prospects
Cheater (2006)
Ender's Shadow (1999) (Note: The events of Ender's Game, Ender's Shadow and A War of Gifts take place in roughly the same time period. The events of A War of Gifts only take place during the time at Battle School).) Ender's Shadow: Battle School (2009) Command School (2010) Ultimate collection (2012)
The Shadow Trilogy (Note: The events of Ender in Exile and the Shadow Trilogy take place in roughly the same time period.: First part of Ender in Exile (2/3) takes place during the Shadow Trilogy.; Last part of Ender in Exile (1/3) takes places after Shadow of the Giant.) (Note: Note on the following (maybe not yet so common) Trilogies: "Speaker Trilogy": Original set of sequels to Ender's Game, also referred to as: "Ender Quartet" (Ender's Game combined with "Speaker Trilogy"), also referred to as: "Ender Quintet" ("Ender Quartet" combined with Ender in Exile).; "Shadow Trilogy": Original set of sequels to Ender's Shadow, also referred to as: "Bean Quartet"/"Shadow Quartet" (Ender's Shadow combined with "Shadow Trilogy"), also referred to as: "Bean Quintet"/"Shadow Quintet" ("Bean Quartet" combined with Shadows in Flight), could be referred to as: "Bean Sextet"/"Shadow Sextet" ("Bean Quintet" combined with The Last Shadow)) Shadow of the Hegemon (2001) Shadow Puppets (2002) Shadow of the Giant (2005)
Shadows in Flight (2012)
Messenger (2018)
The Last Shadow (2021)

Formic Wars: Burning Earth (2011) Formic Wars: Silent Strike (2012)	First Formic; War Trilogy Earth Unaware (2012) Earth Afire (2013) Earth Awakens (2014)
Second Formic; War Trilogy The Swarm (2016) The Hive (2019) The Queens (TBA)
Mazer in Prison (2005)	Mazer in Prison (2010)
Pretty Boy (2006)
Ender's Game; Alive (2013) Recruiting Valentine (2009) The League War (2010)	Ender's Game (1977) Ender's Game (1985) Ender's Game: Battle School (2009) Command School (2010) Ultimate collection (2012) Ender's Game (2013)
Ender's Homecoming (2008) A Young Man with Prospects (2007) Ender in Flight (2008) The Gold Bug (2007)	Ender in Exile (2008) Ender in Exile (2011) Gold Bug (2010)
Governor Wiggin (2017)
Investment Counselor (1999)
Speaker for the Dead (2011) Gloriously Bright (1991)	The Speaker Trilogy Speaker for the Dead (1986) Xenocide (1991) Children of the Mind (1996)

War of Gifts (2010) Mazer in Prison Recruiting Valentine The League War War of Gifts
The Polish Boy (2002)
Teacher's Pest (2003)
Ender's Stocking (2007) A War of Gifts (2007) War of Gifts (2009)
Fleet School (Note: Title is also mentioned in regard to a possible sequel for the film.) Children of the Fleet (2017)... (TBC)
Renegat (2017)

At the start of Children of the Mind, Jane, the evolved computer intelligence, is using her newly discovered abilities to take the races of buggers, humans and pequeninos outside the universe and back instantaneously. She uses these powers to move them to distant habitable planets for colonization. She is losing her memory and concentration as the vast computer network connected to the ansible is being shut down. If she is to survive, she must find a way to transfer her aiúa (or soul) to a human body.

Peter Wiggin and Si Wang-Mu travel to the worlds of Divine Wind and Pacifica to persuade the Japanese-led swing group of the Starways Congress to revoke their order to destroy Lusitania. By tracing the decision-making trail backwards, they are able to show a philosopher his influence on the Starways Congress. After several complications, the philosopher persuades the Tsutsumi clan to exert their influence with the Necessarian faction in the Starways Congress to stop the Lusitania fleet. The admiral at the head of the Lusitania fleet, however, disobeys the Congress's order and does what he believes Ender Wiggin, the perpetrator of the first Xenocide, would have done and fires a missile containing the Molecular Disruption Device (MDD).

Upon Ender Wiggin's death, Jane guides his aiúa to Peter's body, while she is granted possession of Young Val's body, and thus is not destroyed when the ansible shuts down. She is then able to continue transporting starships instantaneously by borrowing the vast mental capacity of the simple-minded Pequenino mother-trees. She transports a ship with Peter and Wang-Mu around the missile, then transports the missile and them to inside of the Lusitania fleet, where it is then disarmed and disabled. Peter and Wang-Mu's efforts finally come to fruition, and the destruction of Lusitania is averted.

Jane falls in love with Miro, and Peter with Wang-mu. Both couples are married under one of the mother-trees of the pequeninos on the same day as Ender's funeral.

== See also ==
- List of Ender's Game characters
- Orson Scott Card bibliography
