= Ender's Game (disambiguation) =

Ender's Game is a 1985 novel by Orson Scott Card.

Ender's Game may also refer to:

- "Ender's Game" (short story), a 1977 story by Orson Scott Card
- Ender's Game (novel series), a series of science fiction books by Orson Scott Card
- Ender's Game (comics), a series of comic book adaptations of the novels by Orson Scott Card
- Ender's Game (film), a 2013 film based on the novel
