= First Meetings =

2002 book by Orson Scott Card

- First edition
- Author: Orson Scott Card
- Cover artist: Gail Cross
- Language: English
- Series: Ender's Game series
- Genre: Science fiction
- Publisher: Subterranean Press
- Publication date: 2002
- Publication place: United States
- Media type: Print (hardback & paperback)
- Pages: 149
- ISBN: 1-931081-69-7
- OCLC: 50596863

Chart

Short Stories	Novels	Comics	Audioplay	Film

First Meetings (in the Enderverse) (2002 (2003)) Ender's Game Investment Counselor The Polish Boy Teacher's Pest
OSCs InterGalactic; Medicine Show (2008) Mazer in Prison Cheater Pretty Boy A Young Man with Prospects
Cheater (2006)
Ender's Shadow (1999) (Note: The events of Ender's Game, Ender's Shadow and A War of Gifts take place in roughly the same time period. The events of A War of Gifts only take place during the time at Battle School).) Ender's Shadow: Battle School (2009) Command School (2010) Ultimate collection (2012)
The Shadow Trilogy (Note: The events of Ender in Exile and the Shadow Trilogy take place in roughly the same time period.: First part of Ender in Exile (2/3) takes place during the Shadow Trilogy.; Last part of Ender in Exile (1/3) takes places after Shadow of the Giant.) (Note: Note on the following (maybe not yet so common) Trilogies: "Speaker Trilogy": Original set of sequels to Ender's Game, also referred to as: "Ender Quartet" (Ender's Game combined with "Speaker Trilogy"), also referred to as: "Ender Quintet" ("Ender Quartet" combined with Ender in Exile).; "Shadow Trilogy": Original set of sequels to Ender's Shadow, also referred to as: "Bean Quartet"/"Shadow Quartet" (Ender's Shadow combined with "Shadow Trilogy"), also referred to as: "Bean Quintet"/"Shadow Quintet" ("Bean Quartet" combined with Shadows in Flight), could be referred to as: "Bean Sextet"/"Shadow Sextet" ("Bean Quintet" combined with The Last Shadow)) Shadow of the Hegemon (2001) Shadow Puppets (2002) Shadow of the Giant (2005)
Shadows in Flight (2012)
Messenger (2018)
The Last Shadow (2021)

Formic Wars: Burning Earth (2011) Formic Wars: Silent Strike (2012)	First Formic; War Trilogy Earth Unaware (2012) Earth Afire (2013) Earth Awakens (2014)
Second Formic; War Trilogy The Swarm (2016) The Hive (2019) The Queens (TBA)
Mazer in Prison (2005)	Mazer in Prison (2010)
Pretty Boy (2006)
Ender's Game; Alive (2013) Recruiting Valentine (2009) The League War (2010)	Ender's Game (1977) Ender's Game (1985) Ender's Game: Battle School (2009) Command School (2010) Ultimate collection (2012) Ender's Game (2013)
Ender's Homecoming (2008) A Young Man with Prospects (2007) Ender in Flight (2008) The Gold Bug (2007)	Ender in Exile (2008) Ender in Exile (2011) Gold Bug (2010)
Governor Wiggin (2017)
Investment Counselor (1999)
Speaker for the Dead (2011) Gloriously Bright (1991)	The Speaker Trilogy Speaker for the Dead (1986) Xenocide (1991) Children of the Mind (1996)

War of Gifts (2010) Mazer in Prison Recruiting Valentine The League War War of Gifts
The Polish Boy (2002)
Teacher's Pest (2003)
Ender's Stocking (2007) A War of Gifts (2007) War of Gifts (2009)
Fleet School (Note: Title is also mentioned in regard to a possible sequel for the film.) Children of the Fleet (2017)... (TBC)
Renegat (2017)

First Meetings (2002) is a collection of science fiction short stories by American writer Orson Scott Card, belonging to his Ender's Game series. Tor Books republished the book in 2003 under the titles First Meetings in the Enderverse and First Meetings in Ender's Universe and included the more recent "Teacher's Pest", a story about the first meeting of Ender's parents.

== Story list ==
The stories in this book are:

- "The Polish Boy" (2002) – Tells how Jan Paweł Wieczorek (Ender's father) as a small child gets tested by the International Fleet and convinces them to get his family out of Poland.
- "Teacher's Pest" (2003) (Not present in 2002 version of book) – Tells the story of how John Paul Wiggin (Ender's father) meets and falls in love with his future wife.
- "Ender's Game" (1977) – First appeared in the August 1977 issue of Analog magazine and was later expanded into the novel Ender's Game. Although the foundation of the Ender's Game series, the short story is not properly part of the Ender's Game universe, as there are many discrepancies in continuity.
- "Investment Counselor" (1999) – Tells how Ender Wiggin first met the artificial intelligence Jane and became a speaker for the dead. It first appeared in the anthology Far Horizons edited by Robert Silverberg.

== Plot summaries ==
=== The Polish Boy ===
Polish: Jan Paweł Wieczorek (John Paul Wiggin) is a very smart child who is being homeschooled because his family refused to comply with the population's control laws. One day, Captain Helena Rudolf from the International Fleet shows up to test three of John Paul's brothers for possible admission into Battle School. She notices John Paul reading a book and decides to test him early. He passes the test and gets a very high score for leadership. The IF tries to get him to go to Battle School, but John Paul is only interested in trying to get his family out of Poland so that they can have a better life and he can get a good education. Captain Graff realizes this, but agrees to send the Wieczorek family to America because he hopes that one of John Paul's children will go to Battle School.

This story contains younger versions of important characters in the Enderverse, such as Ender's father John Paul Wieczorek (later Wiggin), Hyrum Graff, and Admiral Chamrajnagar. Other characters associated with the IF appear, including Captain Helena Rudolf and Colonel Sillian.

=== Teacher's Pest ===
While going to college, John Paul is assigned to take a Human Communities class being taught by Theresa Brown. First being annoyed at having to take a class being taught by a graduate student, John Paul soon changes his mind as Theresa Brown leads the class through a provocative debate about communities, war, and population laws. Unfortunately, she has just been told that her research project is being taken away from her in an effort to get her father Admiral Brown to come out of retirement. As a result, she does not want to speak to anyone. Determined, John Paul waits outside her office and orders food for her while she talks to her father on the phone. When she finally comes out, he is still waiting for her. She decides to eat with him, and during the meal John Paul tells her about his secret past. As they continue to talk, they both begin to fall in love, even as they realize that they were both set up by the government to do so.

=== Ender's Game (short story) ===
This story begins as Ender is made the commander of Dragon Army at Battle School, an institution designed to make young children into military commanders against an unspecified enemy. Armies are groups of students that fight mock battles in the Battle Room, a null gravity environment, and are subdivided into "toons". Due to Ender's genius in leadership, Dragon Army dominates the competition. After his nineteenth consecutive victory, Ender is told that his Army is being broken up and his toon leaders made commanders in their turn, while he is transferred to Command School for the next stage of his education. Here, veteran Mazer Rackham tutors him in the use of a space battle simulator. Eventually, many of his former toon leaders serve under him once more. Once familiar with the simulator, they fight a series of what Mazer tells them are mock battles against a computer-controlled enemy. Ender's team wins again and again, finally destroying a planet that the enemy fleet seems to be protecting. Once the battle is over, Mazer tells Ender that all of the battles were real, the children's commands having been relayed to the extant fleet, and that he has destroyed the enemy's home world and ended the war.

=== Investment Counselor ===
Ever since the events of Ender's Game, Ender Wiggin has been voyaging through space at near-lightspeed. When he arrives at the planet Sorelledolce, he has just turned twenty in relativistic time, so he has to file his first tax return on the trust fund which had been given to him by the International Fleet at the end of the Third Bugger War. He shows his list of investments to Benedetto, a tax collector in the starport, who immediately plans to steal some of it. Meanwhile, Andrew receives an email offering him financial software, which has an interactive personality that calls itself Jane.

While they are on Sorelledolce, Andrew's sister Valentine Wiggin takes him to a "speaking" for a dead man. Andrew talks to the speaker and discovered that the man learned how to be a speaker for the dead from reading Ender's own books, The Hive Queen and The Hegemon.

Highly skeptical at first, Andrew eventually decides to try the Jane program. She prepares his tax forms, showing him ways to minimize what he owes. The amount is so vastly less than he had expected, he finds it hard to believe it is accurate, but Jane tells him that tax laws are designed for the benefit of the rich. When Andrew delivers the forms to Benedetto, the tax collector tries to blackmail him because he has discovered Ender's identity as the hated Xenocide. Ender refuses to comply. After he leaves, Benedetto finds that the information he uncovered has either mysteriously disappeared or is now inaccessible behind Fleet security. In an attempt to get revenge against Ender, he tries to leak what data he still has to the media, but Jane appears on his screen and gives him a choice: "Either say nothing, or tell the whole truth." Benedetto rejects the first option, but when the media receives his story, a full account of his embezzlements is appended to it.

Benedetto is arrested, his claims against Andrew are assumed to be falsehoods, and while he is in prison one of his victims has him killed. Andrew does a speaking at Benedetto's funeral, shedding light on the dead man's motivations. He has thus inadvertently found a career, that of a "speaker for the dead."

== See also ==
- List of Ender's Game characters
- List of Short Stories in Ender's Universe
- Orson Scott Card bibliography
