= Gloriously Bright =

- Short story by Orson Scott Card
- Country: United States
- Language: English
- Genre: Science fiction

Publication
- Published in: Analog Science Fiction and Fact
- Media type: Print (Paperback)
- Publication date: January 1991
- Series: Ender's Game series

"Gloriously Bright" is a science fiction short story by American writer Orson Scott Card, set in his Ender's Game universe. It tells the story of Han Qing-jao and Si Wang-mu as they interact with Jane, the gods of Path, the Starways Congress, and the knowledge of OCD. It appears in the January 1991 issue of Analog Science Fiction and Fact.

== Plot summary ==
Starways Congress wants its fleet back. After all else fails, it sends the dilemma of the fleet's impossible disappearance to several citizens of the world of Path. Path's culture centers on the godspoken – those who hear the voices of the gods in the form of irresistible compulsions, and are capable of significantly superior intelligence. It later becomes clear that the godspoken of Path are victims of a cruel government project: granted great intelligence by genetic modification, they were also shackled with a form of obsessive-compulsive disorder to control their loyalty. The experiment is set in a culture bound by five dictates - obey the gods, honor the ancestors, love the people, serve the rulers, then serve yourself. This is a further safeguard against rebellion. The superintelligent godspoken are considered the most devout and holy of all citizens, and any disloyal thoughts in a godspoken's mind are immediately suppressed by overwhelming obsessive-compulsive behavior, believed to be a sign from the gods the thoughts are wrong. The most respected godspoken on Path is Han Fei-Tzu, for devising a treaty to prevent the rebellion of several colony worlds after the articles published by Demosthenes. Great things are expected of his daughter and potential successor Han Qing-jao, "Gloriously Bright". While doubting the existence of the gods himself, Han Fei-Tzu promised his dying wife he would raise Qing-jao with an unwavering belief in the godspoken. The two of them are tasked by Starways Congress with deciphering the disappearance of the Lusitania Fleet. Han Qing-jao's secret maid, Si Wang-mu, aids her in this task, her intelligence (partially) unfettered by the rigid caste system.

Qing-jao eventually traces the identity of Demosthenes. Discovering that Demosthenes is Valentine Wiggin, Ender's sister – but that Valentine has been on a starship en route to Lusitania for the last thirty years – Qing-Jao concludes that the only possible explanation is advanced computer software closely tied to the communication network. This software must be hiding Demosthenes and publishing her work, while also causing the disappearance of the Fleet. All but discovered, Jane reveals herself to Han Fei-tzu, Han Qing-jao and Si Wang-mu, telling them about their genetic slavery and begging forbearance on their report to Starways Congress.

Already harboring suspicions about the godspoken's condition, Han Fei-tzu accepts the news of Congress's atrocity, as does Si Wang-mu, but his daughter Han Qing-jao clings to her belief that Demosthenes and Jane are enemies of the gods. Feeling betrayed by her father, who is violently incapacitated by OCD from the disloyal thoughts, Qing-jao argues with Jane. Jane threatens shutting off all communications from Path, but Si Wang-mu realizes this would eventually lead to the planet's destruction by Starways Congress. Understanding Jane to be truly alive and compassionate, through tears Si Wang-mu states Jane will not block the report. However, Qing-jao compares Jane to the servants in Path's caste system, merely a computer program designed to serve humans, containing neither autonomy nor awareness.

Knowing she has exhausted her last possibilities of stopping Qing-jao, Jane sacrifices her future and life, unwilling to bring harm to Qing-jao or the people of Path. A triumphant Qing-jao reports the knowledge of Demosthenes, Jane, and the fate of the Fleet to Starways Congress. Qing-jao recommends a coordinated date set several months from the present, to prepare the massive undertaking of setting up clean computers across the interplanetary network, after which the transition to a new system will kill Jane and allow Congress full control again. Allowing the message to be sent, Jane restores communication with the Fleet, and Congress re-issues the order for the Fleet to obliterate Lusitania.

== Characters ==
- Han Qing-jao
- Si Wang-mu
- Han Fei-tzu
- Jane
- Ender Wiggin

== Publication ==
"Gloriously Bright" was published in the January 1991 issue of Analog Science Fiction and Fact. "Gloriously Bright" is reprinted as parts of Chapters 1, 3, 5, 7, 9, and 11 of Xenocide. It also includes about 20 paragraphs recounting Jane’s story from Speaker for the Dead that are not republished elsewhere.
