= Jimmy Pinchak =

American actor

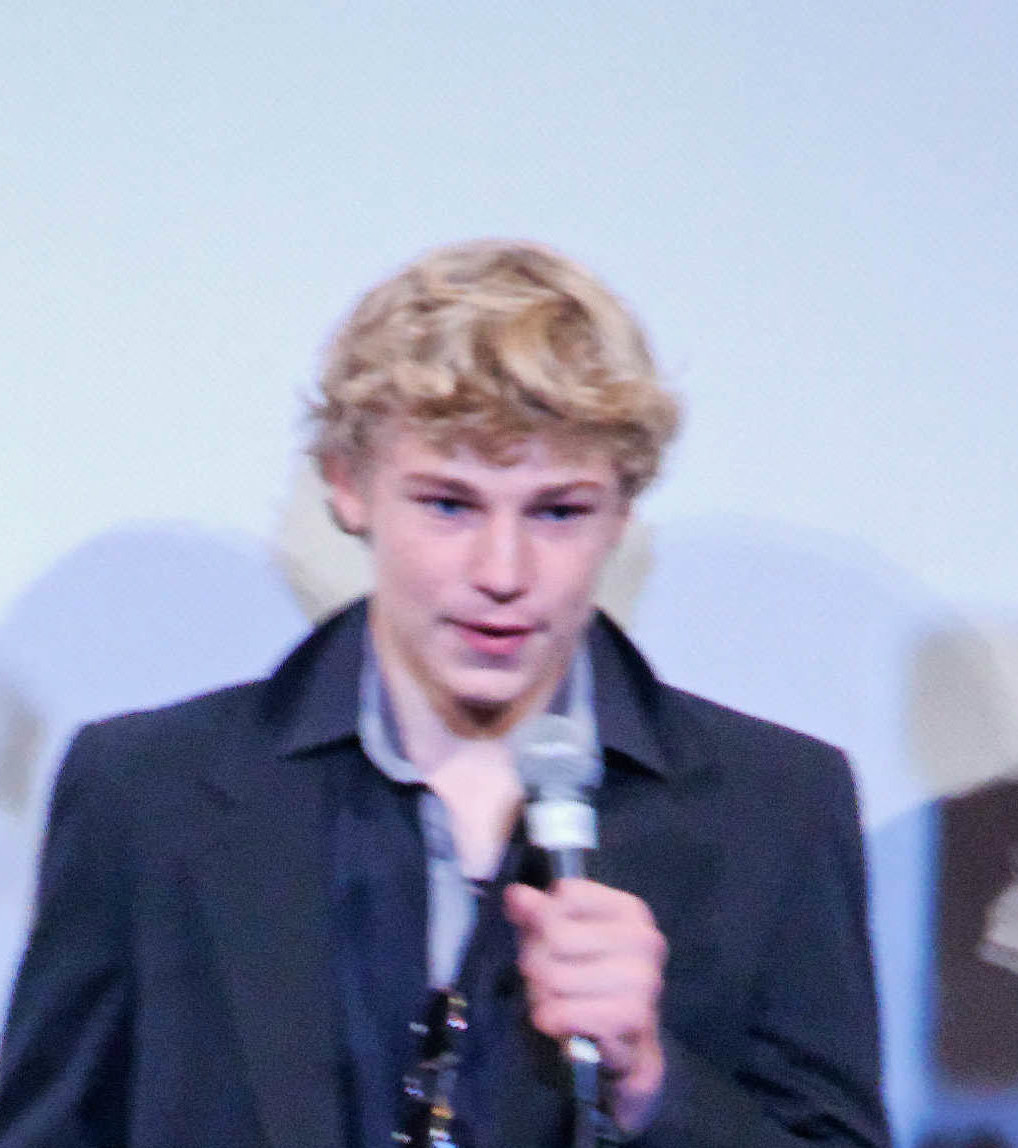
- Jimmy Pinchak
- Born: James Justin Pinchak; February 16, 1996 (age 29); Point Pleasant, New Jersey, U.S.
- Education: Cornell Law School, Cornell University, B.S.
- Occupations: Actor; musician
- Years active: 2002–2013; 2025

Jimmy Jax Pinchak (born James Justin Pinchak; February 16, 1996) is an American actor, musician, and attorney.

== Life and career ==
Born James Justin Pinchak, he grew up in Point Pleasant, New Jersey. He acted the movements for "Know-It-All" in the animated film The Polar Express (voice was provided by Eddie Deezen) and played the lead in made-for-TV movie All I Want For Christmas, Hostage and Meteor. He also played Eddy in Over There and Mark in Let Me In, a remake of the Swedish film Let the Right One In. In 2008, he starred in the pilot episode of the family comedy Growing Up Normal about a child actor growing up in Hollywood. In 2011, Jimmy made a guest appearance on NCIS. In 2010-2011, Pinchak played a recurring role in Ray Romano's Men of a Certain Age on TNT. In 2013, Pinchak played Peter Wiggin, the older brother of Ender Wiggin, in the film Ender's Game (2013).

In addition to acting, Pinchak is a blues rock musician. In 2014, The Jimmy Jax Pinchak Band released a blues rock album titled Make It Better. In 2018, The Jimmy J Pinchak Band released Blue on Arrival.

Pinchak earned his Juris Doctor degree from Cornell Law School in 2021 and his Bachelor of Science degree from Cornell University in 2018.

== Filmography ==
Film
Year	Film	Role	Notes
2004	The Polar Express	Know-It-All	Motion capture film
2005	Hostage	Sean	
2007	All I Want for Christmas	Jesse	
2010	Let Me In	Mark	
2013	Ender's Game	Peter Wiggin	
Television
Year	Title	Role	Notes
2002–2003	Family Affair	Jody	Main role (episodes 3–16)
2003	CSI: Crime Scene Investigation	Jimmy	Episode: "Inside the Box"
2005	Over There	Eddy	Recurring role
2006	Brothers & Sisters	Teddy Traylor	Unaired television pilot
2007	All I Want For Christmas	Jesse Armstrong	TV movie
2009	Meteor	Michael Hapscomb	Miniseries
2011	Growing Up Normal	Jimmy Jackson	Episode: Pilot
2011	NCIS	Jason	Episode: "One Last Score"
2011	Men of a Certain Age	Wes	Recurring role
2025	NCIS: Origins	Jimmy	Episode: “Funny How Time Slips Away”
