= Shadow Puppets =

2002 novel by Orson Scott Card

- Author: Orson Scott Card
- Language: English
- Series: Ender's Game series
- Genre: Science fiction
- Publisher: Tor Books
- Publication date: 9 August 2002
- Publication place: United States
- Media type: Print (hardback & paperback)
- Pages: 384
- ISBN: 0-7653-0017-6
- OCLC: 51336647
- Dewey Decimal: 813/.54 21
- LC Class: PS3553.A655 S53 2002
- Preceded by: Shadow of the Hegemon
- Followed by: Shadow of the Giant

Shadow Puppets is a science fiction novel by American author Orson Scott Card, published in 2002. It is the sequel to Shadow of the Hegemon and the third book in the Ender's Shadow series (often called the Bean Quartet). It was originally to be called Shadow of Death.

== Plot summary ==
Chart

Short Stories	Novels	Comics	Audioplay	Film

First Meetings (in the Enderverse) (2002 (2003)) Ender's Game Investment Counselor The Polish Boy Teacher's Pest
OSCs InterGalactic; Medicine Show (2008) Mazer in Prison Cheater Pretty Boy A Young Man with Prospects
Cheater (2006)
Ender's Shadow (1999) (Note: The events of Ender's Game, Ender's Shadow and A War of Gifts take place in roughly the same time period. The events of A War of Gifts only take place during the time at Battle School).) Ender's Shadow: Battle School (2009) Command School (2010) Ultimate collection (2012)
The Shadow Trilogy (Note: The events of Ender in Exile and the Shadow Trilogy take place in roughly the same time period.: First part of Ender in Exile (2/3) takes place during the Shadow Trilogy.; Last part of Ender in Exile (1/3) takes places after Shadow of the Giant.) (Note: Note on the following (maybe not yet so common) Trilogies: "Speaker Trilogy": Original set of sequels to Ender's Game, also referred to as: "Ender Quartet" (Ender's Game combined with "Speaker Trilogy"), also referred to as: "Ender Quintet" ("Ender Quartet" combined with Ender in Exile).; "Shadow Trilogy": Original set of sequels to Ender's Shadow, also referred to as: "Bean Quartet"/"Shadow Quartet" (Ender's Shadow combined with "Shadow Trilogy"), also referred to as: "Bean Quintet"/"Shadow Quintet" ("Bean Quartet" combined with Shadows in Flight), could be referred to as: "Bean Sextet"/"Shadow Sextet" ("Bean Quintet" combined with The Last Shadow)) Shadow of the Hegemon (2001) Shadow Puppets (2002) Shadow of the Giant (2005)
Shadows in Flight (2012)
Messenger (2018)
The Last Shadow (2021)

Formic Wars: Burning Earth (2011) Formic Wars: Silent Strike (2012)	First Formic; War Trilogy Earth Unaware (2012) Earth Afire (2013) Earth Awakens (2014)
Second Formic; War Trilogy The Swarm (2016) The Hive (2019) The Queens (TBA)
Mazer in Prison (2005)	Mazer in Prison (2010)
Pretty Boy (2006)
Ender's Game; Alive (2013) Recruiting Valentine (2009) The League War (2010)	Ender's Game (1977) Ender's Game (1985) Ender's Game: Battle School (2009) Command School (2010) Ultimate collection (2012) Ender's Game (2013)
Ender's Homecoming (2008) A Young Man with Prospects (2007) Ender in Flight (2008) The Gold Bug (2007)	Ender in Exile (2008) Ender in Exile (2011) Gold Bug (2010)
Governor Wiggin (2017)
Investment Counselor (1999)
Speaker for the Dead (2011) Gloriously Bright (1991)	The Speaker Trilogy Speaker for the Dead (1986) Xenocide (1991) Children of the Mind (1996)

War of Gifts (2010) Mazer in Prison Recruiting Valentine The League War War of Gifts
The Polish Boy (2002)
Teacher's Pest (2003)
Ender's Stocking (2007) A War of Gifts (2007) War of Gifts (2009)
Fleet School (Note: Title is also mentioned in regard to a possible sequel for the film.) Children of the Fleet (2017)... (TBC)
Renegat (2017)

Peter, Ender's brother, is now Hegemon of Earth. Accepting a tip from inside China, where Achilles is held prisoner, Peter had planned for Bean to operate the mission, but at the last minute (because he doubted Bean would cooperate) assigns Suriyawong, a Battle School student from Thailand, to rescue Achilles in transport. Peter believes that he can spy on Achilles, take over his network, and then turn Achilles over to some country for trial, since Achilles has previously betrayed Russia, Pakistan, and India.

Achilles is known to kill anyone who has seen him vulnerable. Bean and his friend Petra, who also served under Ender and who is travelling with Bean, have both seen Achilles so and immediately go into hiding, preparing for a future confrontation. Bean believes Peter has seriously underestimated Achilles, and that he himself is not safe unless he is hidden. During their travels, Petra convinces Bean to marry her and have children with her by taking him to Anton, the person who Anton's Key (Bean's Condition) was named after. Bean is reluctant to have children, as he does not want his Anton's Key gene to be passed on. He finds Volescu, the original doctor who activated the key in his genes, and has him prepare nine embryos through artificial insemination. Volescu pretends to identify three embryos with Anton's Key and they are discarded. One of the remaining six is implanted into Petra, while the rest of them are placed under guard.

At the same time, a message is passed to Bean that Han Tzu, a comrade from Battle School, was not in fact the informant in the message sent to Peter about Achilles. Realizing that it had been a setup, Bean gets a message to Peter's parents, and they flee with Peter from the Hegemon's compound, located in Brazil, which Achilles takes over. Bean narrowly escapes an assassination attempt himself, and escapes to Damascus. There they find that another Battle School comrade, Alai, is the unrivaled Caliph of a nearly unified Muslim world. Meanwhile, Bean and Petra's embryos are stolen; Bean expects Achilles to use them to bait a trap for them.

Peter and his parents escape to the colonization platform in space that used to be the battle school, relying on the protection of Colonel Graff, the former commander of the school, now Minister of Colonization. Shortly after they arrive, however, a message is sent betraying their presence. Faking their departure from the space station, Peter and his parents discover the traitor, one of the teachers at battle school. The unmanned shuttle sent as a decoy is shot down over Brazil.

In the previous novel, China had conquered India and Indochina. Alai plans to liberate them by invading first China in a feint, and then India once China has withdrawn its armies to defend the homeland. His invasion is successful, and in the midst of realizing their danger, the Chinese government disavows Achilles, providing evidence that he stole the missile launcher that destroyed the decoy space shuttle. Left with nowhere to turn, Achilles contacts Bean and offers the embryos in exchange for safe passage.

Bean and Peter return to the Hegemon's compound. Achilles expects Bean to be so distracted with the idea of retrieving his children that he can be killed with a bomb in the embryo transport container. When Bean sees through that trap, Achilles offers up fake embryos in petri dishes, expecting to lure Bean into a vulnerable position. However, Bean sees through the deception. He pulls out a pistol and shoots Achilles in the eye—a similar fashion to Achilles' first victim, Poke, whom he killed with a knife to the eye in Ender's Shadow.

The novel ends with Peter restored as Hegemon, Petra reunited with Bean, a Caliph in command of the world's Muslims, a China severely reduced in territory and forced to accept humiliating surrender terms, and the embryos still lost.

== See also ==
- List of Ender's Game characters
- Orson Scott Card bibliography
