= Young Actors Theatre Islington =

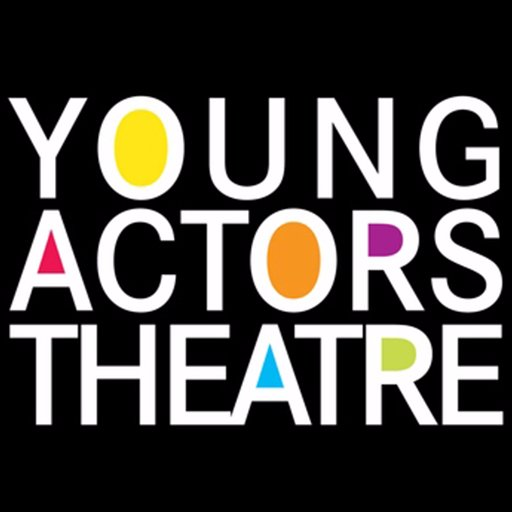

Location
- 70-72 Barnsbury Road; London, N1 0ES; England

Information
- Type: Independent, Performing Arts School, Charity
- Established: 2005; 21 years ago
- Local authority: Islington
- Specialist: Performing Arts
- President: Andy Serkis
- Artistic Director: Andrew Harries
- Gender: Coeducational
- Age: 3 to 24
- Enrolment: 650~
- Website: youngactors.org.uk

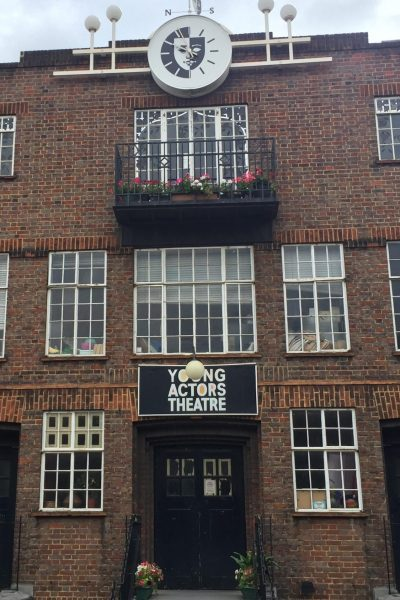
Young Actors Theatre in Islington

Young Actors Theatre Islington (YATI) is an independent and co-educational performing arts school based in the Islington district of London, England. The organisation also functions as a charity agency for children and young adults who wish to pursue a career in acting.

== History ==
The theatre is housed inside a converted Edwardian chapel on Barnsbury Road, and has been a home for the dramatic arts since 1972.

Formerly the site of the Anna Scher Theatre, the building was reorganised and renamed the "Young Actors Theatre" in 2005 in order to meet the goals of the charity without Scher.

In 2014, actor Andy Serkis became the president for the organisation, serving in the capacities of both sponsor and ambassador on behalf of the charity.

== Notable alumni ==
- Asa Butterfield - (Hugo, Ender's Game)
- Franz Drameh - (Legends of Tomorrow, Edge of Tomorrow)
- Fady Elsayed - (Class, My Brother the Devil)
- Ella Purnell - (Never Let Me Go, Miss Peregrine's Home for Peculiar Children)
- Nell Fisher - (Stranger Things 5, Evil Dead Rise, Bookworm)
