= Ender's Game (short story) =

- Short story by Orson Scott Card
- Country: United States
- Language: English
- Genre: Science fiction

Publication
- Published in: Analog
- Publication type: Periodical
- Publisher: Dell Magazines
- Media type: Print (Magazine)
- Publication date: 1977
- Series: Ender's Game series

"Ender's Game" is a science fiction novelette by American writer Orson Scott Card. It first appeared in the August 1977 issue of Analog magazine and was later expanded into the 1985 novel Ender's Game. Although it serves as the foundation of the Ender's Game series, the novelette is not considered to be properly a part of the Ender's Game universe, as there are many discrepancies in continuity between it and the novel.

== Plot summary ==
This story begins as Ender is made the commander of Dragon Army at Battle School, an institution designed to make young children into military commanders against an unspecified enemy. Armies are groups of students that fight mock battles in the Battle Room, a null gravity environment, and are subdivided into "toons". Due to Ender's genius in leadership, Dragon Army dominates the competition. After his nineteenth consecutive victory, Ender is told that his Army is being broken up and his toon leaders made commanders in their turn, while he is transferred to Command School for the next stage of his education. Here, veteran Maezr Rackham tutors him in the use of a space battle simulator. Eventually, many of his former toon leaders serve under him once more. Once familiar with the simulator, they fight a series of what Maezr tells them are mock battles against a computer-controlled enemy. Ender's team wins again and again, finally destroying a planet that the enemy fleet seems to be protecting. Once the battle is over, Maezr tells Ender that all battles were real, the children's commands having been relayed to the extant fleet, and that he has destroyed the enemy's home world and ended the war.

== Characters ==
=== Children ===
- Ender Wiggins (Note: Called Ender Wiggin in the adapted novel, but Wiggins in the short story. For example, "Ender Wiggins paused and looked over the group.") – commander of Dragon Army
- Bean – toon leader in Dragon Army and at Command School
- Ren – toon leader in Dragon Army
- Peder – toon leader in Dragon Army and at Command School
- Brian – toon leader in Dragon Army
- Wins – toon leader in Dragon Army and at Command School
- Younger – toon leader in Dragon Army and at Command School
- Lee – toon leader at Command School
- Vlad – toon leader at Command School
- Carn Carby – commander of Rabbit Army
- Pol Slattery – commander of Leopard Army
- William Bee – commander of Griffin Army

=== Adults ===
- Captain Graff (Note: Called Colonel Graff in the adapted novel, but Captain in the original short story. For example, "Captain Graff, six foot two and a little chubby, stroked his belly as he leaned back in his chair.")
- Lieutenant Anderson
- Lieutenant Morris
- Maezr Rackham (Note: Called Mazer Rackham in the adapted novel, but Maezr in the original short story. For example, "Maezr Rackham was sitting cross-legged on the floor when Ender awoke.")
- Teachers at Command School – unnamed
- Medic at Command School – unnamed
- Observers during the final battle – unnamed

== Relationship to the novel ==
This novelette was later expanded into the 1985 novel Ender's Game. Although the basic plot is the same, the novel changes some elements, and introduces many others. In the novel, Ender's surname changes from "Wiggins" to "Wiggin", and the name of his "teacher" changes from "Maezr" to "Mazer". The novel supplies a detailed background for Ender and the interstellar conflict with the buggers (in later novels referred to as Formics); the novelette supplies virtually no background whatsoever; the terms "Earth" and "human" do not occur at all, and the enemy remains nameless and faceless.

In the novel, Battle School is a space station orbiting Earth, and Command School inside the asteroid Eros; in the novelette, the former is a terrestrial building and the latter an orbital space station.

In addition, several characters are changed: the antagonist Bonzo Madrid replaces Pol Slattery as the commander who loses to Ender during an unfair battle. Carn Carby is written as a much more supportive character. In the novelette, Ender says to Bean, "How can they put you under an idiot like Carn Carby!" while the novel instead has him say "Carn Carby's a good man. I hope he recognizes you for what you're worth".

In the novel, the final chapter introduces the sequel Speaker for the Dead.

== Publication ==
- Analog Science Fiction and Fact, August 1977
- Unaccompanied Sonata and Other Stories, Dial Press, 1980
- The Future at War vol. 2: The Spear of Mars, Ace Books, 1980
- Analog Readers' Choice, Dial Press, 1981
- Unaccompanied Sonata and Other Stories, Dell, 1981, with an introduction by Ben Bova discussing "Ender's Game" and the "discovery" of Card.
- Analog Anthology #2, Davis Publications, 1982
- There Will Be War, Tor Books, 1983
- Battlefields Beyond Tomorrow: Science Fiction War Stories, Bonanza Books, 1987
- Maps in a Mirror, Tor Books, 1990
- First Meetings, Subterranean Press, 2002
- The Prentice Hall Anthology of Science Fiction and Fantasy, Prentice-Hall 2003
