= Asa Butterfield =

English actor (born 1997)

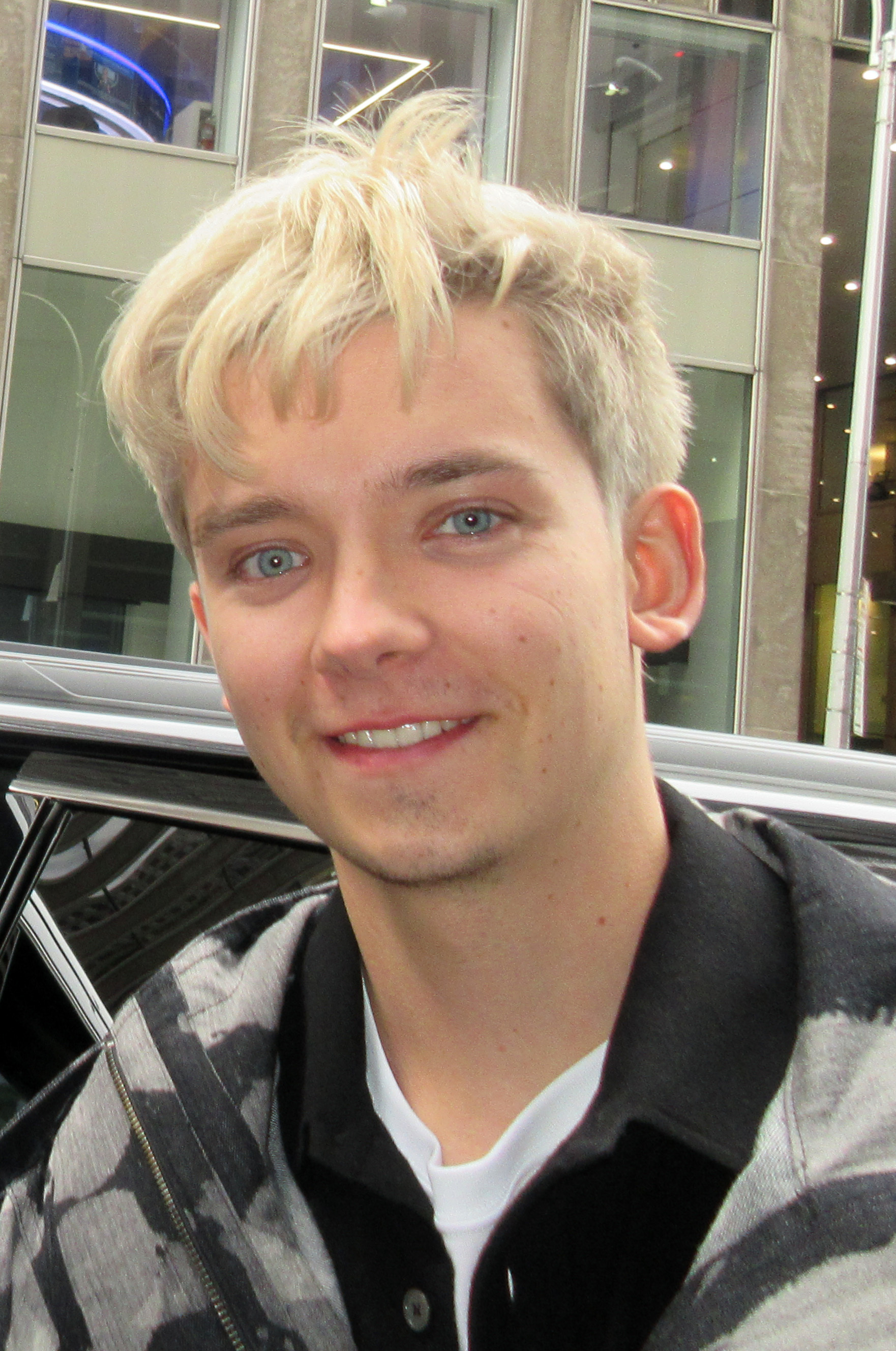
- Butterfield in New York City, 2018
- Born: Asa Bopp Farr Butterfield; 1 April 1997 (age 29); London, England
- Occupation: Actor
- Years active: 2006–present

Asa Bopp Farr Butterfield (/ˈeɪsə/ AY-sə; born 1 April 1997) is an English actor. Beginning his career as a child actor, he first achieved recognition as the lead of the historical drama film The Boy in the Striped Pyjamas (2008). He continued to headline films during the 2010s, starring in the adventure drama Hugo (2011), the science-fiction film Ender's Game (2013), the drama X+Y (2014), the fantasy Miss Peregrine's Home for Peculiar Children (2016) and the romantic science-fiction The Space Between Us (2017). From 2019 to 2023, Butterfield was the lead of the Netflix comedy-drama series Sex Education.

== Background ==
Asa Bopp Farr Butterfield was born on 1 April 1997 in Islington, London, and is the son of Jacqueline "Jake" Farr, a psychologist, and Sam Butterfield, an advertising copywriter. He is named after the comet Hale-Bopp. He was educated at Stoke Newington School in Stoke Newington, London.

== Career ==
Butterfield started acting at age seven at the Young Actors Theatre Islington in Islington. Later, he secured minor roles in After Thomas, a 2006 television drama, and the 2007 film Son of Rambow.

In 2008, he had a guest role playing Donny in the television series Ashes to Ashes. Also in 2008, at 10, Butterfield played the lead role in The Boy in the Striped Pyjamas. Director Mark Herman said that they came across Butterfield early on in the audition process. He was on the first audition tape Herman received and he was the third hopeful he met in person. Herman thought Butterfield's performance was outstanding, but only decided to cast him after auditioning hundreds of other boys, "so no stone was left unturned". Herman and producer David Heyman were looking for someone who was able to portray the main character's innocence, so they asked each of the children what they knew about the Holocaust. Butterfield's knowledge was slim and it was purposely kept that way throughout filming so it would be easier for him to convey his character's innocence. The final scenes of the film were shot at the end of the production period to prepare both him and Jack Scanlon for the dramatic conclusion of the film.

Butterfield beat hundreds of boys and also successfully passed the auditions for a role in Mr. Nobody, for which he auditioned at the same time. He elected not to pursue the latter role. In 2008, he portrayed Mordred in the Merlin episode "The Beginning of the End"; he appeared as Mordred in a number of subsequent episodes. In 2010, he had a small part in The Wolfman. He starred as Norman Green in Nanny McPhee and the Big Bang (2010). The film and his performance received positive reviews. At age 13, Butterfield played the main and titular character in Martin Scorsese's Hugo, adapted from the novel The Invention of Hugo Cabret. Hugo was released on 23 November 2011 and achieved critical success. He portrayed the title role of Andrew "Ender" Wiggin in the film adaptation of the Orson Scott Card novel Ender's Game. The film was released in 2013.

After the shooting of Ender's Game, Butterfield was cast in coming of age British drama X+Y as Nathan Ellis, a mathematical savant on the autism spectrum selected to compete in an internationally renowned mathematics competition. The film premiered on 5 September 2014 at the Toronto International Film Festival in Toronto. His performance received widespread critical acclaim and he was nominated for the BIFA for Best Actor.

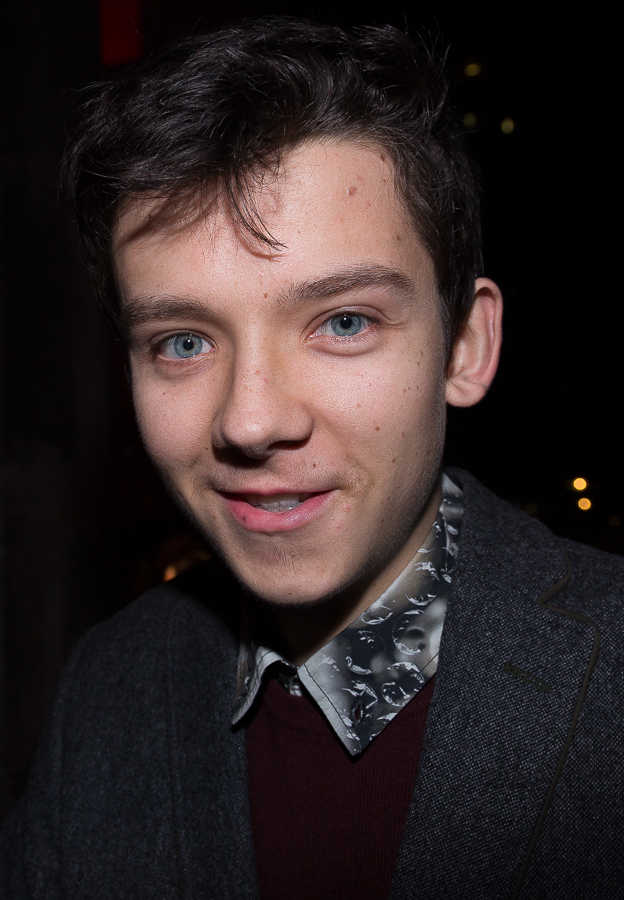
Butterfield at the 2014 British Independent Film Awards at Old Billingsgate in London

In 2015, Butterfield appeared in a film adaptation of Ten Thousand Saints. In 2016, he portrayed Jacob Portman in Miss Peregrine's Home for Peculiar Children. He starred as Gardner Elliot in the film The Space Between Us and as Sebastian in The House of Tomorrow in 2017. In 2018, he was cast in the main role of Otis Milburn on the Netflix comedy-drama series Sex Education. The series was released on 11 January 2019 to critical acclaim. The second season was released on 17 January 2020, the third on 17 September 2021, and the fourth and final season on 21 September 2023.

In July 2024, he was cast as Adam in Carnival: At the End of Days, an unreleased film. He portrays Solomon in the film Our Hero, Balthazar, which received acclaim in early reviews ahead of a wide release. He was specifically lauded for his performance by The Austin Chronicle and The Hollywood Reporter.

== Other ventures ==
Butterfield enjoys making and producing music; he released a mashup of the songs "Teenage Dirtbag" by Wheatus and "Making Plans for Nigel" by XTC. Along with his brother, he is part of a music group called Mambo Fresh. In late 2012, Butterfield co-designed a turn-based video game for iPad with his father and brother called Racing Blind. The game was released to App Store on 7 April 2013.

Butterfield is involved in competitive Nintendo gaming. In 2017, he competed in the Nintendo World Championships, where he was eliminated early in the invitational. He is an enthusiastic player of competitive Super Smash Bros. and signed with esports team Panda Global, under the tag "Stimpy". His first appearance with the organisation was at Genesis 6. In October 2020, he was signed by Team Liquid.

Since 2017, Butterfield has taught an annual acting masterclass at The Reel Scene acting school in London. The three-day "Asa Butterfield Masterclass" course covers improvisation techniques and students work on scenes from Butterfield's films, which are then filmed on the last day. In 2018, students appeared as extras in the film Greed in which Butterfield appeared.

In 2023, Butterfield played in the annual Soccer Aid charity football match, raising money for UNICEF. Butterfield, a lifelong Arsenal fan, scored England's opening goal assisted by former Arsenal player Jack Wilshere.

== Filmography ==
Key
†	Denotes films that have not yet been released

=== Film ===
Year	Title	Role	Notes	Ref.
2007	Son of Rambow	Brethren Boy		
2008	The Boy in the Striped Pyjamas	Bruno		
2010	Nanny McPhee and the Big Bang	Norman Green		
2010	The Wolfman	Younger Ben Talbot		
2011	Hugo	Hugo Cabret		
2013	Ender's Game	Ender Wiggin		
2014	X+Y	Nathan Ellis	Also known as A Brilliant Young Mind	
2015	Ten Thousand Saints	Jude Keffy-Horn		
2016	Miss Peregrine's Home for Peculiar Children	Jacob "Jake" Portman		
2017	The House of Tomorrow	Sebastian Prendergast		
2017	Journey's End	Jimmy Raleigh		
2017	The Space Between Us	Gardner Elliot		
2018	Then Came You	Calvin Lewis		
2018	Time Freak	Stillman		
2018	Slaughterhouse Rulez	Willoughby Blake		
2019	Greed	Finn McCreadie		
2022	Choose or Die	Isaac		
2022	Flux Gourmet	Billy Rubin		
2022	Your Christmas or Mine?	Hubert James Hughes		
2023	All Fun and Games	Marcus Fletcher		
2023	Your Christmas or Mine 2	James		
2025	Our Hero, Balthazar	Solomon		
2025	Stitch Head	Stitch Head (voice)		
2026	Rogue Trooper			

=== Television ===
Year	Title	Role	Notes	Ref
2006	After Thomas	Andrew	Television film	
2008	Ashes to Ashes	Donny	1 episode (season 1)	
2008–2009	Merlin	Mordred	3 episodes	
2017	Thunderbirds Are Go	Space Controller Conrad (voice)	1 episode	
2019–2023	Sex Education	Otis Milburn	Main role	
2020	50 States of Fright	Brandon Boyd	3 episodes	
2026	Unchosen	Adam		
2026	Gnomes	Arnold Kipps	TV series	

=== Theatre ===
Year	Title	Role	Venue	Notes
2025	Second Best	Martin Hill	Riverside Studios	

=== Video games ===
Year	Title	Role	Notes
2024	Hades II	Icarus	

== Awards and nominations ==
Year	Award	Category	Work	Result	Ref.
2008	British Independent Film Awards	Most Promising Newcomer	The Boy in the Striped Pyjamas	Nominated	
2009	NSPCC Awards	Young British Performer of the Year	The Boy in the Striped Pyjamas	Nominated	
2009	Young Artist Awards	Best Performance in an International Feature Film – Leading Young Performers	The Boy in the Striped Pyjamas	Nominated	
2012	Critics' Choice Movie Awards	Best Young Performer	Hugo	Nominated	
2012	Empire Awards	Best Male Newcomer	Hugo	Nominated	
2012	Saturn Awards	Best Performance by a Younger Actor	Hugo	Nominated	
2012	Young Artist Awards	Best Performance in a Feature Film – Leading Young Actor	Hugo	Nominated	
2012	Young Hollywood Awards	Breakthrough Performance – Male	Hugo	Won	
2013	Critics' Choice Movie Awards	Best Young Performer	Ender's Game	Nominated	
2013	Washington DC Area Film Critics Association Awards	Best Youth Performance	Ender's Game	Nominated	
2014	British Independent Film Awards	Best Actor	X+Y	Nominated	
2014	Saturn Awards	Best Performance by a Younger Actor	Ender's Game	Nominated	
2015	National Film Awards UK	Best Actor	X+Y	Nominated	
2017	Teen Choice Awards	Choice Fantasy Movie Actor	Miss Peregrine's Home for Peculiar Children	Nominated	
2017	Teen Choice Awards	Choice Sci-Fi Movie Actor	The Space Between Us	Nominated	
2020	Newport Beach Film Festival	Artist of Distinction	Sex Education	Won	
2020	NME Awards	Best TV Actor	—	Nominated	
2022	British Independent Film Awards	Best Ensemble	Flux Gourmet	Nominated	
2022	National Comedy Awards	Outstanding Comedy Actor	Sex Education	Won	
