= Jane (Ender's Game) =

- Ender series character
- First appearance: Speaker for the Dead
- Created by: Orson Scott Card

In-universe information
- Occupation: artificial sentience

Jane is a fictional character in Orson Scott Card's Ender series. She is an energy based artificial sentient creature called an Aiúa that was placed within the ansible network by which spaceships and planets communicate instantly across galactic distances. She has appeared in the novels Speaker for the Dead, Xenocide, and Children of the Mind, and in a short story "Investment Counselor". Her 'face', a computer-generated hologram that she uses to talk to Ender, is described as plain and young, and it is illustrated in First Meetings as having a bun.

This article is arranged to reflect the Ender timeline. However, the Ender Quartet: Ender's Game (1985), Speaker for the Dead (1986), Xenocide (1990), and Children of the Mind (1994) was written first; then Ender's Shadow (1999), First Meetings (2004), and Shadow of the Giant (2005).

== Origin ==
=== Ender's Game ===
The Fantasy Game is the faculty's primary method of obtaining information about their students in Ender's Game. It is designed to secretly map out the psyche of the players, providing valuable data on each student's thoughts and decision-making processes. Colonel Graff refers to the game sarcastically as the Mind Game. In the course of its service at the Battle School, the Game successfully analyzes every student but one: Bean, who realizes the game's true purpose and refuses to play.

The student chooses a character and plays through a number of scenarios. One scenario, called the Giant's Drink, offers the player a choice between two beverages, with the promise of admission to "Fairyland" with the correct choice. However, the scenario is actually a no-win situation which invariably results in the player's death. By tracking how frequently a player attempts it, the Giant's Drink detects and warns teachers of suicidal tendencies among the students. To their consternation, Ender confronts the Giant obsessively, failing dozens of times. Finally, he refuses to choose a drink and instead attacks the Giant, killing it and becoming the first student to enter Fairyland; the Game generates this new scenario on the spot, orienting it specifically to Ender himself. This creates a deep connection between him and the Game, with significant consequences later on.

=== Ender's Shadow ===
The Fantasy Game is discussed in greater depth in Ender's Shadow. It is described by the teachers themselves as an extremely complex program that generates content procedurally. The Mind Game is never meant to be conclusive, it only makes connections and discovers patterns that are too subtle for the human eye.

=== Shadow of the Giant ===
In Shadow of the Giant, when Bean suspects Peter Wiggin of embezzling Ender's trust fund for his Hegemony uses, he recalls the nature of the Fantasy Game and requests that Graff place it in charge of Ender's trust fund. The Game, whose original purpose was to seek out patterns across wide fields of data, is modified to predict markets and invest Ender's trust fund appropriately. Alarmingly effective in this new capacity, it is later called upon to review demographic data and help Bean find seven of his eight stolen embryos/children. The Fantasy Game is assumed to have grown in complexity during the 3000-year gap between Shadow of the Giant and Speaker for the Dead, especially as Graff describes the Mind Game as being able to reprogram itself, and finally becomes the sentient Jane.

== Appearances ==
=== First Meetings ===
"Investment Counselor", a short story in First Meetings, describes the first meeting between Jane and Ender where Jane presents herself to Ender as a computerized program meant to help with taxes. Ender takes her up on the offer, and begins a lifelong friendship with this computer entity.

=== Speaker for the Dead ===
Jane is first introduced in Speaker for the Dead as an advanced computer program. She is extremely complex, capable of performing trillions of tasks simultaneously, and has millions of levels of attention, even her most unaware one being much more alert than a human. Jane is hesitant to reveal herself to humanity, because she knows that she is the epitome of humanity's fear: an intelligent, thinking, computer program that cannot be controlled. She decided to reveal herself to Ender after she found out he wrote The Hive Queen and The Hegemon, in hopes that he would eventually understand her and one day reveal her true nature to humanity. She also "remembered" he was the only student to pass the Giant's Drink, one of the many Fantasy Game situations.

An electronic "jewel" in Ender's ear allows both of them to communicate and for her to see and hear everything from Ender's vantage point. She helps Ender with many things. For example, in the very beginning, she contacts an orbiting ship and pays $40 billion for it and the cargo. Ender's reliance on Jane becomes obvious when she no longer helps him; he must ask young Olhado to help him with his finances and computer searches, and does not know the password to his own bank account.

Jane plays a pivotal role in the development of the book. Jane guides Ender to Lusitania and helps him out considerably in obtaining information. In a pivotal scene, Ender impatiently disconnects her by turning off the jewel; Jane panics and is forced to reorient her vast amount of concentration which was focused on him. Concluding that Ender needs a common enemy to unite all of Lusitania together to help the piggies, she runs analysis on data and subversively gets Starways Congress to order the destruction of the planet. She makes it appear as if Lusitania has cut off their ansible (she did this mainly to save a xenologer from being killed), triggering Starways Congress to send the "Evacuation Fleet," which is actually carrying the Molecular Disruption Device to destroy the planet. With the threat, Ender unites the colony to form a treaty with the piggies to assure mutual cooperation and peaceful coexistence.

No longer attached to Ender, she bonds with Miro, Ender's depressed paralyzed stepson.

=== Xenocide ===
In this novel, she silences the Lusitania Fleet by making it disappear from all ansibles. Starways Congress contracts the brightest mind on a world of geniuses, Han Fei-Tzu, to discover what happened to the fleet, as previous attempts have failed. He passes the task to his daughter, Han Qing-Jao. Jane has left no evidence, however, and it is precisely this lack of evidence that leads Qing-Jao to conclude that some unseen force is operating and monitoring all the ansibles at once. Although she suspects that it is the work of the gods, Jane realizes that Qing-Jao will eventually discover her existence.

Facing defeat, Jane reveals herself to Qing-Jao and her intellectually neglected servant, Si Wang-Mu. After a heated discussion, Qing-Jao despairs because Jane's power is vast; Jane can shut down all the ansibles, making it impossible for Qing-Jao to reveal Jane's presence. However, Jane knows that she cannot continue to silence Qing-Jao's message forever, since it would snowball into cutting off the entire planet of Path. Thus, Jane refuses to silence the ansible, Qing-Jao sends the message, and Starways Congress plans the systematic silencing of all ansibles to kill Jane.

In this book it is revealed that the Hive Queens, who were seeking a way to contact Ender during his crusade, attempted to construct a philotic 'bridge' so that they could contact him. This bridge was meant to be a connection between Ender, whose philotic web they did not understand, and a structure whose philotic web they did understand; for this baseline, they chose the Fantasy Game, since Ender was so deeply focused upon it and since its structure was sufficiently orderly. Jane was the bridge they constructed, imbuing her with the quality which all living things have, an aiúa (resembling a soul). Jane, in other words, is an intelligent being, not just a collection of software. The Hive Queen further explains that Jane's aiúa was called from a space outside of the universe, just as all aiúas are. Grego and Olhado, hearing this, hypothesize that, if someone can somehow contain all the information on how a spaceship's philotes are organized (i.e., its structure down to a subatomic level), that person could essentially "will" the spaceship Outside and In again, instantaneously (that is, without any time passing). This will be entirely dependent on Jane, since no other being possesses the ample mental capacity to hold the complete structure of an object in its mind.

Jane's test flight consists of a sealed box with a door, Ender (to whom Jane is inextricably philotically linked; indeed, her aiúa resides within him), Miro (for the same reason), and Ela (so that she can create the recolada virus once they are Outside). While Outside, Ela creates the recolada virus, Miro recreates his healthy body and possesses it, and Ender unconsciously creates duplicates of his childhood brother and sister.

=== Children of the Mind ===
In the conclusion of the Ender Saga, Jane finds herself rapidly running out of processing power due to Starways Congress shutting down her active ansible connections one at a time in an attempt to deactivate her for good. The Congress completes the shutdown of all universal ansible connections, forcing Jane's "aiúa" (the term Jane uses to describe the entity of life which all living things have) to seek refuge amongst the Philotic Web of the Pequenino Mother-Trees.

Jane is also simultaneously responsible for instantaneous travel. A simple spacecraft is constructed (later deemed unnecessary due to Jane's precision in transportation), and through holding the image of the traveler in her consciousness, Jane can pick up the image and place it anywhere in the universe instantly. This advancement is threatened by Congress' attempt to deactivate her "program."

In the end, Jane is given corporeal form in the body created in the form of young Valentine, made of a portion of Ender's aiúa. Jane's aiúa is capable of transcending this corporeal form and returning to the philotic link of the Mother-Trees, or the reconstructed ansible network of which she was born, thus preserving the instantaneous method of travel. Jane, now in the possession of Val's body, marries Miro in a double-wedding ceremony along with Peter and Si-Wang-Mu.

== Development ==
Card wasn't aware at the time of writing Speaker for the Dead that the computer that Ender interacted with would become a character. Card considers Jane's character pivotal in developing Ender's adult persona and in the process, she became a living thing as well. Her character became a major theme of the Xenocide. After killing the Buggers, Ender is responsible for reconciling the differences between the Piggies and Humans. In the process, Jane's character, as the sole member of her species, also must face reconciling with humanity.

== Critical reception ==
In a collection of criticism columns, David Langford commented that Jane's character was "unnecessary to the main action" of the story. In Sarah Kember's Cyberfeminism and Artificial Life, Jane is compared to HAL from A Space Odyssey. Unlike HAL, which Kember described as artificial intelligence, Jane is artificial life and capable of asking critical questions about the nature of her existence.
