= Unaccompanied Sonata =

- Short story by Orson Scott Card
- Country: United States
- Language: English
- Genres: Speculative fiction, philosophical fiction

Publication
- Published in: Unaccompanied Sonata and Other Stories
- Publisher: Dial Press
- Media type: Print (Hardcover & Paperback)
- Publication date: 1980

"Unaccompanied Sonata" is a short story by American writer Orson Scott Card, first published in the March 1979 issue of Omni magazine. It appears in his short story collections Unaccompanied Sonata and Other Stories and Maps in a Mirror. It was nominated in 1979 for the Nebula Award for Best Short Story and in 1980 for the Hugo Award for Best Short Story.

== Plot summary ==
A child is brought up to be a musical prodigy. He is raised alone in a cabin by unsinging servants, in order to guarantee that his only musical influences are natural. He plays on a complicated instrument capable of a wide range of sound, but is absolutely disallowed from hearing the music of others, for, he is told, that would corrupt his originality and make his work derivative. At some point he is, against the wishes of his keepers, introduced to the music of Bach, and when this is discovered by a "Watcher", he is uprooted from his composition at the age of thirty, and is then barred by law from ever again making music. The story then follows him as he struggles to repress his desire for musical expression.

== See also ==
- List of works by Orson Scott Card
- Orson Scott Card
