= I Put My Blue Genes On =

- Short story by Orson Scott Card
- Country: United States
- Language: English
- Genre: Science fiction

Publication
- Published in: Analog Science Fiction and Fact
- Publication type: Periodical
- Publisher: Dell Magazines
- Media type: Print (Magazine)
- Publication date: August 1978

"I Put My Blue Genes On" is a science fiction short story by American writer Orson Scott Card, first published in the August 1978 issue of Analog Science Fiction and Fact. It also appears in his short story collections Unaccompanied Sonata and Other Stories and Maps in a Mirror.

== Plot summary ==
The story takes place far in the future. Earth has become an uninhabitable wasteland of biological warfare. After fleeing Earth decades earlier, a contingent of humans returns to find a small band of beings, now not quite human, still fighting an enemy which has long since been annihilated. The title refers to the planet's surface, which has become a swirling mass of blue goo, a result of the biological agents acting and reacting one with another.

== See also ==
- List of works by Orson Scott Card
