= Unaccompanied Sonata and Other Stories =

1980 book by Orson Scott Card

- First edition
- Author: Orson Scott Card
- Cover artist: Lucinda Cowell
- Language: English
- Genre: Science fiction, Fantasy
- Publisher: Dial Press
- Publication date: 1980
- Publication place: United States
- Media type: Print (hardback & paperback)
- Pages: 272
- ISBN: 0-8037-9175-5
- OCLC: 6626526
- Dewey Decimal: 813/.54 19
- LC Class: PS3553.A655 U5

Unaccompanied Sonata and Other Stories (1980) is a collection of short stories by American writer Orson Scott Card. Although not purely science fiction and definitely not hard science fiction, the book contains stories that have a futuristic angle or are purely works of fantasy set in current times. All the stories except “The Porcelain Salamander” were first published elsewhere before appearing in the Unaccompanied Sonata collection. All eleven of these stories were later published in Maps in a Mirror.

== Story list ==
The short stories in this book are:

- "Ender’s Game"
- "Kingsmeat"
- "Deep Breathing Exercises"
- "Closing the Timelid"
- "I Put My Blue Genes On"
- "Eumenides in the Fourth Floor Lavatory"
- "Mortal Gods"
- "Quietus"
- "The Monkeys Thought 'Twas All in Fun"
- "The Porcelain Salamander"
- "Unaccompanied Sonata"

== See also ==
- List of works by Orson Scott Card
- Orson Scott Card
