= Ender's Game =

1985 novel by Orson Scott Card

- 1985 first edition (hardcover)
- Author: Orson Scott Card
- Cover artist: John Harris
- Language: English
- Series: Ender's Game series
- Genre: Science fiction
- Publisher: Tor Books
- Publication date: January 1985
- Publication place: United States/Canada
- Media type: Print (Hardcover, Paperback & Ebook)
- Pages: 324
- ISBN: 0-312-93208-1
- OCLC: 23355613
- Followed by: Speaker for the Dead

Ender's Game is a 1985 military science fiction novel by American author Orson Scott Card. Set at an unspecified date in Earth's future, the novel presents an imperiled humankind after two conflicts with an insectoid alien species they dub "the buggers". In preparation for an anticipated third invasion, Earth's international military force recruits young children, including the novel's protagonist, Andrew "Ender" Wiggin, to be trained as elite officers. The children learn military strategy and leadership by playing increasingly difficult war games, including some in zero gravity, where Ender's tactical genius is revealed.

The book originated as a short story of the same name, published in the August 1977 issue of Analog Science Fiction and Fact. The novel was published on January 15, 1985. Later, by elaborating on characters and plotlines depicted in the novel, Card wrote additional books in the Ender's Game series. Card released an updated version of Ender's Game in 1991, changing some political facts to account for the then-recent dissolution of the Soviet Union and the end of the Cold War. The novel has been translated into 34 languages. In the movie adaptation and novels after the original sequels, "buggers" are referred to as "Formics".

Reception of the book has been largely positive. It has become suggested reading for military organizations such as the United States Marine Corps. Ender's Game was recognized as "best novel" by the 1985 Nebula Award and the 1986 Hugo Award in the genres of science fiction and fantasy. Its four sequels—Speaker for the Dead (1986), Xenocide (1991), Children of the Mind (1996), and Ender in Exile (2008)—follow Ender's subsequent travels to many different worlds in the galaxy. In addition, the later novella A War of Gifts (2007) and novel Ender's Shadow (1999), plus other novels in the Shadow saga, take place during the same time period as the original.

A film adaptation of the same name, written for the screen and directed by Gavin Hood, and starring Asa Butterfield as Ender, was released in October 2013. Card co-produced the film. The novel has also been adapted into two comic book series.

== Plot ==
Chart

| Short Stories | Novels | Comics | Audioplay | Film |

First Meetings (in the Enderverse) (2002 (2003)) Ender's Game Investment Counselor The Polish Boy Teacher's Pest
OSCs InterGalactic; Medicine Show (2008) Mazer in Prison Cheater Pretty Boy A Young Man with Prospects
Cheater (2006)
Ender's Shadow (1999) (Note: The events of Ender's Game, Ender's Shadow and A War of Gifts take place in roughly the same time period. The events of A War of Gifts only take place during the time at Battle School).) Ender's Shadow: Battle School (2009) Command School (2010) Ultimate collection (2012)
The Shadow Trilogy (Note: The events of Ender in Exile and the Shadow Trilogy take place in roughly the same time period.: First part of Ender in Exile (2/3) takes place during the Shadow Trilogy.; Last part of Ender in Exile (1/3) takes places after Shadow of the Giant.) (Note: Note on the following (maybe not yet so common) Trilogies: "Speaker Trilogy": Original set of sequels to Ender's Game, also referred to as: "Ender Quartet" (Ender's Game combined with "Speaker Trilogy"), also referred to as: "Ender Quintet" ("Ender Quartet" combined with Ender in Exile).; "Shadow Trilogy": Original set of sequels to Ender's Shadow, also referred to as: "Bean Quartet"/"Shadow Quartet" (Ender's Shadow combined with "Shadow Trilogy"), also referred to as: "Bean Quintet"/"Shadow Quintet" ("Bean Quartet" combined with Shadows in Flight), could be referred to as: "Bean Sextet"/"Shadow Sextet" ("Bean Quintet" combined with The Last Shadow)) Shadow of the Hegemon (2001) Shadow Puppets (2002) Shadow of the Giant (2005)
Shadows in Flight (2012)
Messenger (2018)
The Last Shadow (2021)

Formic Wars: Burning Earth (2011) Formic Wars: Silent Strike (2012) | First Formic; War Trilogy Earth Unaware (2012) Earth Afire (2013) Earth Awakens (2014)
Second Formic; War Trilogy The Swarm (2016) The Hive (2019) The Queens (TBA)
Mazer in Prison (2005) | Mazer in Prison (2010)
Pretty Boy (2006)
Ender's Game; Alive (2013) Recruiting Valentine (2009) The League War (2010) | Ender's Game (1977) Ender's Game (1985) Ender's Game: Battle School (2009) Command School (2010) Ultimate collection (2012) Ender's Game (2013)
Ender's Homecoming (2008) A Young Man with Prospects (2007) Ender in Flight (2008) The Gold Bug (2007) | Ender in Exile (2008) Ender in Exile (2011) Gold Bug (2010)
Governor Wiggin (2017)
Investment Counselor (1999)
Speaker for the Dead (2011) Gloriously Bright (1991) | The Speaker Trilogy Speaker for the Dead (1986) Xenocide (1991) Children of the Mind (1996)

War of Gifts (2010) Mazer in Prison Recruiting Valentine The League War War of Gifts
The Polish Boy (2002)
Teacher's Pest (2003)
Ender's Stocking (2007) A War of Gifts (2007) War of Gifts (2009)
Fleet School (Note: Title is also mentioned in regard to a possible sequel for the film.) Children of the Fleet (2017)... (TBC)
Renegat (2017)

War breaks out between humans and an insect-like alien race referred to as "buggers". The humans are able to repel the First and Second Invasions by narrow margins. Earth's space military force is the International Fleet (I.F.), which trains gifted children to become commanders at their orbiting Battle School.

Andrew "Ender" Wiggin is born a "Third": a rare exception to Earth's two-child policy, allowed by the government due to the promise and high intellect displayed by his two older siblings. The eldest, Peter, is a sociopath who bullies Ender. His sister, Valentine, is deeply empathic. The I.F. removed Ender's monitoring device when he was six years old, seemingly ending his chances of Battle School. He is taunted and pushed around by his classmates, led by a school bully named Stilson. Ender viciously retaliates against Stilson. Ender is disturbed that he, through his actions, is becoming more like his brother Peter. Unbeknownst to Ender, Stilson later dies from his wounds. Colonel Hyrum Graff visits Ender after hearing about the fight. Ender attests that by showing superiority now, he has prevented future struggle. Graff offers him a place in the Battle School.

Once at Battle School, Graff and the other leaders covertly work to keep Ender isolated. Ender finds solace in playing a simulated adventure game that involves being killed by and eventually killing a giant. The cadets participate in competitive war simulations in zero gravity, where Ender quickly masters the competition with novel tactics. To further wear Ender down, he is promoted to command a new army composed of new recruits, then pitted against multiple armies at once, but Ender's success continues. Ender's jealous ex-commander, Bonzo Madrid, draws him into a fight outside the simulation, and once again seeking to preemptively stop future conflicts, Ender uses excessive force, and Bonzo dies from his injuries without Ender being notified.

Meanwhile on Earth, Peter Wiggin uses a global communication system to post political essays under the pseudonym "Locke", hoping to establish himself as a respected orator and then as a powerful politician. Valentine, despite not trusting Peter, agrees to publish alongside him as "Demosthenes". Their essays are soon taken seriously by the government and the people.

Ender, now ten years old, is promoted to Command School. After some preliminary battles in the simulator, he is introduced to Mazer Rackham, a hero from the First and Second Invasions who saw key patterns in the bugger behavior. Ender participates in space combat simulations created and controlled by Mazer. As the fighting becomes harder, he is joined by some of his friends from the Battle School as sub-commanders. Ender grows depressed by the battles, his isolation, and the way Mazer treats him.

For his final test, under observation by I.F.'s commanders, Ender finds his fleet far outnumbered by bugger ships surrounding their homeworld. He sacrifices his entire fleet to fire a Molecular Disruption Device at the planet. The Device destroys the planet and paralyzes the surrounding bugger fleet. The commanders cheer and celebrate. Mazer informs Ender that the "simulations" were real battles, directing human spacecraft against bugger fleets via an ansible and that Ender has won the war. Ender realizes that he has committed xenocide and become just like Peter, additionally learning about the deaths of Stilson and Bonzo.

Ender and Valentine join a group of space colonists. On their new planet, Ender becomes the colony's governor. He discovers a structure that matches the simulation of the giant game from Battle School and inside finds the dormant egg of a queen. The bugger queen telepathically communicates to Ender that before the First Invasion, they had assumed humans were a non-sentient race, for want of collective consciousness, but realized their mistake too late. Instead, she had reached out to Ender to draw him here and requested that he take the egg to a new planet for the buggers to colonize.

Ender takes the egg and, with information from the queen, writes The Hive Queen under the alias "Speaker for the Dead". Peter, now the leader of Earth and 77 with heart failure, recognizes Ender as the author of The Hive Queen. He asks Ender to write a book about him, which Ender titles The Hegemon. The combined works create a new type of funeral, in which the Speaker for the Dead tells the whole and unapologetic story of the deceased, adopted by many on Earth and its colonies. Ender and Valentine leave the colony and travel to other worlds, looking for a safe place to establish the unborn Hive Queen.

== Creation and inspiration ==
The original "Ender's Game" is a short story published in 1977 that conveys Ender's experiences in Battle and Command School, training, and application of his talents.

At the age of 16, Card conceived of the 'Battle Room' for zero gravity war game training, considering the common failure of WWII trainee pilots to think in three dimensions, and stories from his older brother about various good and bad aspects of his military training. In a commentary track for the 20th anniversary audiobook edition of the novel, as well as in the 1991 Author's Definitive Edition, Card stated that Ender's Game was written to establish the character of Ender for his role of the Speaker in Speaker for the Dead, the outline for which he had written before novelizing Ender's Game. Additionally, in the post-script of the 20th anniversary audiobook edition, Card mentions that he named Ender so that he could have a name that sounded like "endgame" from chess.

In his 1991 introduction to the novel, Card discussed the influence of Isaac Asimov's Foundation series on the novelette and novel. Historian Bruce Catton's work on the American Civil War also influenced Card. Ender's Game was the first science-fiction novel published entirely online, when it appeared on Delphi a year before print publication.

== Critical response ==
Ender's Game won the Nebula Award for best novel in 1985, and the Hugo Award for best novel in 1986, considered the two most prestigious awards in science fiction. Ender's Game was also nominated for a Locus Award in 1986. In 1999, it placed No. 59 on the reader's list of Modern Library 100 Best Novels. It was also honored with a spot on American Library Association's "100 Best Books for Teens". In 2008, the novel, along with Ender's Shadow, won the Margaret A. Edwards Award, which honors an author and specific works by that author for lifetime contribution to young adult literature. Ender's Game was included in Damien Broderick's book Science Fiction: The 101 Best Novels 1985–2010. It ranked number nine on Locus's top SF novels published before 1990.

The New York Times writer Gerald Jonas asserts that the novel's plot summary resembles a "grade Z, made-for-television, science-fiction rip-off movie", but says that Card develops the elements well despite this "unpromising material". Jonas further praises the development of the character Ender Wiggin: "Alternately likable and insufferable, he is a convincing little Napoleon in short pants."

The novel has received criticism for its portrayal of violence and its justification. Elaine Radford's review, "Ender and Hitler: Sympathy for the Superman", posits that Ender Wiggin is an intentional reference by Card to Adolf Hitler and criticizes the violence in the novel, particularly at the hands of the protagonist. Card responded to Radford's criticisms in Fantasy Review, the same publication. Radford's criticisms are echoed in John Kessel's essay "Creating the Innocent Killer: Ender's Game, Intention, and Morality", wherein Kessel states: "Ender gets to strike out at his enemies and still remain morally clean. Nothing is his fault." Noah Berlatsky makes similar claims in his analysis of the relationship between colonization and science fiction, where he describes Ender's Game as in part a justification of "Western expansion and genocide".

The U.S. Marine Corps Professional Reading List makes the novel recommended reading at several lower ranks, and again at Officer Candidate/Midshipman. The book was placed on the reading list by Captain John F. Schmitt, author of FMFM-1 (Fleet Marine Force Manual, on maneuver doctrine) for "provid[ing] useful allegories to explain why militaries do what they do in a particularly effective shorthand way". In introducing the novel for use in leadership training, Marine Corps University's Lejeune program opines that it offers "lessons in training methodology, leadership, and ethics as well. . . . Ender's Game has been a stalwart item on the Marine Corps Reading List since its inception". It is also used as an early fictional example of game-based learning.

== Accolades ==
| Publication | Country | Accolade | Year | Rank |
|---|---|---|---|---|
| Amazon.com | United States | Best of the Century: Best Books of the Millennium Poll | 1999 | 32 |
| Locus | United States | Best 20th Century Science Fiction Novels: Reader's Poll | 2012 | 2 |
| NPR | United States | Top 100 Science Fiction, Fantasy Books: Readers' Poll | 2011 | 3 |
| Publishers Weekly | United States | Bestselling Science Fiction Novels of 2012 | 2012 | 1 |
| Science Channel | United States | Top 10 Sci-fi Books of All Time | 2013 | 5 |

The weeks ending June 9, August 11, September 1, September 8, October 27, November 3, November 10, and November 24, 2013, the novel was No. 1 on The New York Times' Best Sellers List of Paperback Mass-Market Fiction.

== Revisions ==
In 1991, Card made several minor changes to reflect the political climates of the time, including the dissolution of the Soviet Union. In the afterword of Ender in Exile (2008), Card stated that many of the details in chapter 15 of Ender's Game were modified for use in the subsequent novels and short stories. In order to more closely match the other material, Card has rewritten chapter 15 and plans to offer a revised edition of the book.

== Adaptations ==
=== Film ===
After several years of speculation on the possibility, Summit Entertainment financed and coordinated the development of a film in 2011, serving as its distributor. Gavin Hood directed the film, which lasts 1 hour and 54 minutes. Filming began in New Orleans, Louisiana, on February 27, 2012, and was released on November 1, 2013 (USA). A movie preview trailer was released in May 2013 and a second trailer was released later that year.

Card has called Ender's Game "unfilmable", "because everything takes place in Ender's head", and refused to sign a film deal unless he could ensure that the film was "true to the story". Of the film that he eventually agreed to, Card said it was "the best that good people could do with a story they really cared about and believed in", and while warning fans not to expect a completely faithful adaptation, called the film "damn good".

The movie starred Asa Butterfield as Ender Wiggin and Harrison Ford as Colonel Hyrum Graff. It grossed $125 million worldwide, and received mixed reviews from critics.

=== Comics ===
Marvel Comics and Orson Scott Card announced on April 19, 2008, that they would be publishing a limited series adaptation of Ender's Game as the first in a comic series that would adapt all of Card's Ender's Game novels. Card was quoted as saying that it is the first step in moving the story to a visual medium. The first five-issue series, titled Ender's Game: Battle School, was written by Christopher Yost, while the second five-issue series, Ender's Shadow: Battle School, was written by Mike Carey.

=== Audioplay ===
Ender's Game Alive: The Full Cast Audioplay, is a 2013 audio drama written by Orson Scott Card, based on the Ender's Game novel. At over seven hours in length, this retelling of Ender's Game hints at storylines from "Teacher's Pest", "The Polish Boy", "The Gold Bug", Ender's Shadow, Shadow of the Hegemon, Shadow of the Giant, Shadows in Flight, Earth Unaware, and Speaker for the Dead, and gives new insight into the beginnings of Ender's philotic connection with the Hive Queen. Ender's Game Alive is directed by Gabrielle de Cuir, produced by Stefan Rudnicki at Skyboat Media, published by Audible.com, and performed by a cast of over 30 voice actors playing over 100 roles.

Audible also commissioned a German-language adaptation of the same script. Titled Ender's Game/Das grosse Spiel - Das ungekürzte Hörspiel ("The unabridged audio drama"), this adaptation was produced by "Lauscherlounge", directed by Balthasar von Weymarn and performed by a cast of 100 different voice actors including children.

=== Unproduced video game ===
An official Ender's Game video game was never released, though multiple attempts were made. In 2008, Chair Entertainment began developing a downloadable title called Ender's Game: Battle Room, but development was put on indefinite hold in 2010. An Agreement between Card and Amaze Entertainment also never materialized.

== See also ==
- List of Ender's Game characters
- The Last Starfighter - 1984 film with a similar premise
