= Ender's Game (film) =

2013 film by Gavin Hood

- Theatrical release poster
- Directed by: Gavin Hood
- Screenplay by: Gavin Hood
- Based on: Ender's Game by Orson Scott Card
- Produced by: Roberto Orci; Alex Kurtzman; Gigi Pritzker; Linda McDonough; Robert Chartoff; Lynn Hendee; Orson Scott Card; Ed Ulbrich
- Starring: Asa Butterfield; Harrison Ford; Ben Kingsley; Viola Davis; Hailee Steinfeld; Abigail Breslin
- Cinematography: Donald McAlpine
- Edited by: Zach Staenberg; Lee Smith
- Music by: Steve Jablonsky
- Production companies: OddLot Entertainment; Chartoff Productions; Taleswapper; K/O Paper Products
- Distributed by: Summit Entertainment (through Lionsgate)
- Release dates: October 24, 2013 (Germany); November 1, 2013 (United States)
- Running time: 114 minutes
- Country: United States
- Language: English
- Budget: $110–115 million
- Box office: $125.5 million

Ender's Game is a 2013 American military science fiction film written and directed by Gavin Hood, based on the 1985 novel by Orson Scott Card. The film stars Asa Butterfield as Andrew "Ender" Wiggin, a gifted child sent to an advanced military academy in space to prepare for a future alien invasion. The supporting cast includes Harrison Ford, Ben Kingsley, Viola Davis, Hailee Steinfeld, and Abigail Breslin.

Ender's Game was released in the United States on November 1, 2013, by Summit Entertainment. The film received mixed reviews from critics and underperformed at the box-office, grossing $126 million against a $110–115 million budget and posting a projected loss of $68 million for the studio.

== Plot ==
In the future, humanity is preparing to launch an attack on the homeworld of an alien race, called the Formics, that had attacked Earth and killed millions. The Formic invasion was stopped by Mazer Rackham, who crashed his fighter jet into the Formic queenship at the apparent cost of his life. Over the course of 50 years, gifted children are trained by the International Fleet to become commanders of a new fleet for a counterattack.

Cadet Andrew "Ender" Wiggin draws the attention of Colonel Hyrum Graff and Major Gwen Anderson because of his aptitude in simulated space combat so is recruited into Battle School. In the school he is placed with other cadets his age, but Graff treats him as extraordinary, thereby subjecting him to ostracism. The cadets are placed in squads and perform training games in a zero-gravity "Battle Room". Ender quickly adapts to the games, devising new strategies older students had not contemplated. However, Ender is also annoyed that the leaders do not let students read their emails, as they believe it will distract them.

Graff reassigns Ender to Salamander Army, led by Commander Bonzo Madrid. Bonzo, disgusted that the replacement he asked for is an untrained student, forbids Ender from training with the rest of the squad. Cadet Petra Arkanian takes him under her wing and trains him privately, much to Bonzo's chagrin. In the next match, Bonzo forbids Ender from participating in a battle between the Salamander Army and another team. However, seeing the team losing and Petra in trouble, Ender comes to her aid and helps Salamander Army win, regardless of the fact that he has disobeyed orders.

Ender plays a computerized "mind game" set in a fantasy world, which presents difficult choices to the player. In one situation, Ender creates an outside-the-box solution to overcome a seemingly unsolvable problem. Later, he encounters a Formic in the game, and then simulated images involving his psychotic brother, Peter, and compassionate sister, Valentine. Anderson notes these unusual additions to the game are seemingly altered by Ender's interaction with it.

Graff promotes Ender to lead his own squad, which is made up of misfit students. They are put in increasingly difficult battles. In a surprise match against two other teams, including Bonzo's Salamander Army, Ender devises a novel strategy of sacrificing part of his team to achieve a goal, impressing Graff.

After the match, Bonzo attacks Ender out of rage, but Ender fights back, resulting in Bonzo hitting his head and sustaining a serious injury. Bonzo is then briefly seen in the infirmary receiving emergency surgery, leaving his ultimate fate ambiguous. Distraught, Ender quits Battle School, but Graff has Valentine convince him to continue. The group's training is rigorous, and Anderson expresses concern over this, but Graff notes they have run out of time.

Graff takes Ender to humanity's forward base on a former Formic planet near their homeworld to meet with Rackham, who explains that the Formics share a hive-mind mentality and how he exploited it to win the battle. Ender finds that his former squad members are also there to help him train in computerized simulations of large fleet combat; Rackham puts special emphasis on the fleet's Molecular Detachment (MD) Device that is capable of disintegrating matter. (Note: In the film, the MD Device stands for Molecular Detachment Device, whereas in the book, it has also been called the Molecular Disruption Device. In both instances, they are nicknamed the Little Doctor. Black, Jake (2009). The Authorized Ender Companion. Tor Books. p. 368. ISBN 978-0-7653-2063-6.)

Ender's final test is monitored by several fleet commanders. As the simulation starts, Ender finds his fleet over the Formic homeworld, vastly outnumbered. He orders most of his fleet to sacrifice themselves to protect the MD long enough to fire on the homeworld. The resulting chain reaction burns the entire planet.

The simulation ends, and Ender believes the test is over. The commanders restart the video screens, showing that Ender's fleet was in a live mission, destroying the Formic homeworld. Despite Graff congratulating him, Ender becomes livid, having been tricked into killing a race that had never re-attacked Earth.

While asleep, Ender is awoken by the Formic Queen and is directed to a Formic structure nearby as being similar to the ruined castle from the game. She acknowledges Ender's role in the genocide and moves to kill him, but when he shows remorse, she spares his life. The dying Queen gives Ender a Queen egg that she has been protecting.

With the war ended, Ender is promoted to Admiral, given a small ship, and left to his own devices. In a letter to Valentine, he confides that he is going into deep space, determined to find a suitable planet to start a new Formic colony with the Queen egg.

== Cast ==
- Asa Butterfield as Ender Wiggin
- Harrison Ford as Colonel Hyrum Graff
- Hailee Steinfeld as Petra Arkanian
- Viola Davis as Major Gwen Anderson
- Abigail Breslin as Valentine Wiggin
- Ben Kingsley as Mazer Rackham
- Moisés Arias as Bonzo Madrid
- Aramis Knight as Bean
- Suraj Parthasarathy as Alai
- Khylin Rhambo as Dink Meeker
- Jimmy Jax Pinchak as Peter Wiggin
- Conor Carroll as Bernard
- Nonso Anozie as Sergeant Dap
- Tony Mirrcandani as Admiral Chjamrajnager
- Brandon Soo Hoo as Fly Molo

In addition, source author Orson Scott Card has an uncredited voice cameo as the pilot of the shuttle that takes Ender to the battle school space station.

== Production ==
=== Development ===
The first decision I made was not to pursue the Peter—Valentine subplot with the Internet, because that's just watching people type things into the computer. The second decision I made was to give that information about the surprise at the end from the start. In my script we know who Mazer Rackham really is and we know what is at stake as Ender plays his games. But Ender doesn't know, so I think the suspense is actually increased because the audience knows we're about the business of saving the world and that everything depends on this child not understanding that. We care all the more about whether he wins—and we worry that he might not want to. As we watch the adults struggle to get control of Ender, we pity him because of what's happening to him, but we want the adults to succeed. I think it makes for a much more complex and fascinating film than it would have been if I had tried to keep secrets.

– Orson Scott Card (1998)

Since Ender's Game was published in 1985, author Orson Scott Card had been reluctant to license film rights and artistic control for the novel. Card explained that he had many opportunities through the 1980s and 1990s to sell the rights of Ender's Game to Hollywood studios, but refused when creative differences became an issue. With the formation of Fresco Pictures in 1996 (which Card co-founded), the author decided to write the screenplay himself. In a 1998 interview, Card discussed the process of adapting the novel into a screenplay.

In 2003, Card submitted a screenplay to Warner Bros., at which time David Benioff and D. B. Weiss were hired to collaborate on a new script in consultation with the then-designated director Wolfgang Petersen. Four years later, Card wrote a new script not based on any previous ones, including his own. In an interview with Wired, Card admitted two obstacles in writing his scripts were being able to "externalize" Ender's thoughts and making it work, "for people who had never read the book."

Card announced in February 2009 that he had completed a script for Odd Lot Entertainment, and that they had begun assembling a production team. In September 2010, it was announced that Gavin Hood was attached to the project, serving as both screenwriter and director. Card said he had written "about six" different scripts before Hood took over. In November 2010, Card stated that the film's storyline would be a fusion of Ender's Game and its parallel novel, Ender's Shadow, focusing on the important elements of both. In October 2013, he explained that this "buddy-movie approach" between Ender and Bean was a proof of concept and once Hood took over he decided to use Petra as more of a major character. On January 28, 2011, it was reported that Alex Kurtzman and Roberto Orci would be producing the work and would begin presenting the script to prospective investors.

On April 28, 2011, it was announced that Summit Entertainment had picked up the film's distribution and Digital Domain joined Odd Lot Entertainment in a co-production role. Gavin Hood was aboard as director and screenwriter, and Donald McAlpine joined as cinematographer. The producers were Gigi Pritzker and Linda McDonough of Odd Lot Entertainment, Alex Kurtzman and Roberto Orci of K/O Paper Products, Robert Chartoff and Lynn Hendee of Chartoff Productions, who had worked with Card on the development of the film for over 15 years, Card himself, and Ed Ulbrich. Executive producers included Bill Lischak, David Coatsworth, Ivy Zhong and Deborah Del Prete. In an interview with Brigham Young University newspaper The Universe, Card said that his role as producer was in the early stages and that the screenplay is 100% Hood's. Special effects workshop Amalgamated Dynamics provided the special character effects for the film, with founder Tom Woodruff Jr. providing character suit performances.

=== Casting ===
In a 1999 interview, Orson Scott Card confirmed that Jake Lloyd was under consideration for the role of Ender Wiggin, asking fans not to judge Lloyd based on his performance in The Phantom Menace, saying that a better script and direction would result in a better performance. In July 2008, Card stated that he would like to see Nathan Gamble play Ender, and expressed regret that he was "probably too old" for the part. Early in the film's development, in an interview in 1998, Card considered changing Hyrum Graff to a female character, recommending a "dry comic" such as Janeane Garofalo or Rosie O'Donnell for the role. In the same interview, Card suggested Andre Braugher or Will Smith for the role of Mazer Rackham. Brendan Meyer was originally cast in the role of Stilson, but had to leave the production due to a scheduling conflict.

=== Filming ===
Production began in New Orleans, Louisiana, on February 27, 2012. The film was released on November 1, 2013, in the United States.

== Music ==
The original soundtrack for Ender's Game was released on October 22, 2013. The film's score was composed by Steve Jablonsky. Originally, James Horner was announced to compose the film's score, but it turned out that Jablonsky would be doing the score.

The end credits song was recorded by The Flaming Lips featuring Tobacco, titled "Peace Sword", which was sold separately as an EP.

== Media ==
=== Books ===
Ender's Game: Inside the World of an Epic Adventure
- Author: Jed Alger
- Genre: Science Fiction
- Publisher: Insight Editions
- Publication date: October 15, 2013
- Media type: Hardcover
- Pages: 160
- ISBN: 1608872777

Ender's Game: Inside the World of an Epic Adventure is a reference book published by Insight Editions. With a foreword by Ender's Game film director Gavin Hood, the book is broken into four parts: Ender's World, Battle School, Inside Zero-G, and Parallel Worlds. The book is filled with behind-the-scenes images of the making of Ender's Game as well as interviews with the producers, artists, directors, and cast. Included with the book are nine Battle School army logo stickers, an ID Badge for Ender, and two removable International Fleet posters.

=== Board game ===
Ender's Game Battle School
- Designers: Matt Hyra
- Publishers: Cryptozoic Entertainment
- Players: 2
- Playing time: 30–45 minutes

Ender's Game Battle School is the official board game based on the film Ender's Game. Published on November 13, 2013, by Cryptozoic Entertainment, the game is designed by Matt Hyra. Played inside the Battle Room, the player takes control of an Army led by either Commander Ender Wiggin or Commander Bonzo Madrid. With different abilities granted to each Commander, the Armies try to either capture each of its opponent's Gates or freeze the opposing Commander while avoiding other frozen players and Stars.

=== Other merchandise ===
Along with various T-shirts, a 2014 wall calendar, and film inspired covers for both the novel and the Ender's Game Ultimate Collection comic collection, Funko released two Pop! Vinyl figurines of Ender Wiggin and Petra Arkanian. Ender's Game is also the first film to offer 3D printed replicas of in-film 3D assets. Summit Entertainment collaborated with Sandboxr, a 3D printing service, to open a new merchandising platform offering fans the unique ability to customize and build 3D prints from assets used in production.

== Marketing ==
Screenshot used in web promotions

Ender's Game partnered with Audi to bring the Audi fleet shuttle quattro to the motion picture. The partnership with ICEE included releasing two limited time flavors: Battle School Blastberry and Orbital Orange, along with a "Train Like an Astronaut" sweepstakes. Growing Basics offered a chance to win a trip to the Los Angeles premiere of Ender's Game. The Langers Juice Company gave away an Ender's Game T-shirt with three proof-of-purchase. Barnes & Noble also offered various promotions including novels collected in boxed sets inspired by the film. Pik-Nik offered a chance to win a trip for a family of four to the Kennedy Space Center. Popcorn, Indiana held a sweepstakes to win a private screening for the winner and up to 250 friends. Star Studio also offered photobooth backgrounds from Ender's Game.

=== Websites ===
On May 6, 2013, the official movie site for Ender's Game, I.F. Sentinel, launched (I.F. stands for International Fleet, the entity responsible for training the children cadets). Though the site is now filled with short, movie promotional posts, the original site contained new canonical information and characters from the film universe, including archivist Stephen Trawcki, I.F. Major Gerald Stacks, I.F. Academic Secretary Gwen Burton, I.F. Rationing Spokesman Reed Unger, and former Hegemon James van Laake.

On July 17, a recruitment video was released telling users to go to the I.F. Battle School website. Once there, users would be prompted to log onto their Facebook accounts and take a short aptitude test, which when finished would place the user into either Asp, Dragon, Rat, or Salamander Army. Armies would go on to compete against one another in different missions. The first missions involved the users sharing their army assignments on Facebook and Twitter. Doing so unlocked a preview of the film. The second mission had the users compete by once again posting to Facebook and Twitter to try to get their names on a mosaic IMAX poster. The Dragon Army won both missions. The final mission had the users enter sweepstakes from Xbox, IMDb, Yahoo!, and Fandango. There was no winner for the final mission. On September 3, the Battle Room Training game was released on the website. In this game, the user would shoot at different colored stars.

A website called Battle School Command Core opened on September 19, 2013. The website was for those residing in the United Kingdom. The site had six games with a prize for each, including a grand prize trip for two people to NASA.

== Boycott ==
In July 2013, the group Geeks OUT boycotted the film in protest at Orson Scott Card's views on homosexuality and same-sex marriage. The calls for a boycott were picked up by a number of other groups and individuals in the media.

In response to the boycott, Card released a statement in July 2013 to Entertainment Weekly:

Ender's Game is set more than a century in the future and has nothing to do with political issues that did not exist when the book was written in 1984. With the recent Supreme Court ruling, the gay marriage issue becomes moot. The Full Faith and Credit Clause of the Constitution will, sooner or later, give legal force in every state to any marriage contract recognized by any other state. Now it will be interesting to see whether the victorious proponents of gay marriage will show tolerance toward those who disagreed with them when the issue was still in dispute.

Producer Roberto Orci responded in Entertainment Weekly in March that he was not aware of Card's views when he took on development of the film adaptation. He said that "the movie should be judged on its message, not the personal beliefs of the original author", who had minimal involvement in the film. Orci also stated that "if it's on the screen, then I think it's fair game." Lionsgate released a statement stating that "we obviously do not agree with the personal views of Orson Scott Card", while highlighting the company's longtime support of the LGBT community.

== Release ==
This was the last film to be distributed theatrically by Buena Vista International in Japan before the Japanese theatrical brand was renamed Walt Disney Studios Motion Pictures International starting with Need for Speed in March 2014.

=== Home media ===
On February 11, 2014, Ender's Game was released on DVD, Blu-ray, VOD, and PPV, with an early Digital HD window beginning January 28. The DVD includes deleted / extended scenes with optional audio commentary with Director Gavin Hood and audio commentary for the film with Producers Gigi Pritzker and Bob Orci. The Blu-ray also includes an eight-part featurette called "Ender's World: The Making of Ender's Game" and a featurette called "Inside the Mind Game".

== Reception ==
=== Box office ===
Ender's Game was the number one film in North America during its opening weekend, earning $27 million from 3,407 theaters with an average of $7,930 per theater. The film ultimately grossed $61.7 million domestically and $63.8 million internationally, for a worldwide gross of $127.9 million. The film lost a projected $68 million for the studio, with Variety including it in its list of the "Hollywood's Biggest Box Office Bombs of 2013".

=== Critical response ===
On Rotten Tomatoes, the film has an approval rating of 63% based on 225 reviews, with an average rating of 6.10/10. The critical consensus states: "If it isn't quite as thought-provoking as the book, Ender's Game still manages to offer a commendable number of well-acted, solidly written sci-fi thrills." On Metacritic, the film has a score of 51 out of 100 based on reviews from 39 critics indicating "mixed or average" reviews. Audiences polled by CinemaScore gave the film an average grade of "B+" on an A+ to F scale.

Peter Debruge of Variety magazine called it "An impressive, thought-provoking astro-adventure that benefits from the biggest screen available." Richard Roeper of the Chicago Sun-Times praised "the stunning and gorgeous visuals covering every inch of the screen" and describes the film as a "challenging adventure that should satisfy most young fans of the book while keeping the adults engrossed as well."

Marc Bernardin of The Hollywood Reporter is critical of the lack of empathy and shallowness of the story, and wrote: "If only adapter-director Gavin Hood's movie had been tempered with craft and care and wasn't such a blunt instrument, one that seems designed as a delivery system for CGI derring-do instead of the heartbreaker it should be." Bernardin notes the zero-gravity battle scenes might have seemed to be unfilmable, and he commends the special effects, but says the film was unlucky to have come out so soon after Alfonso Cuaron's Gravity, which did it far better. Peter Bradshaw of The Guardian called the film "pacy and visually pleasing despite an overload of ideas". Bradshaw concludes: "The movie's apocalyptic finale indicates that it's bitten off considerably more than it can chew in terms of ideas, but it looks good, and the story rattles along." Simon Abrams of RogerEbert.com says, "The movie... is way too kind, and the drama suffers greatly for it...The film's biggest problem is a matter of tone and characterization: the characters constantly talk about how mean they can be, but their actions suggest otherwise."

Joe Neumaier of the New York Daily News gave the film zero stars, and called it "one of the dullest, dumbest, most tedious movies this year. It makes Battlefield: Earth and John Carter look like The Godfather parts 1 and 2. Dune is Lawrence of Arabia next to this thing." Joe Morgenstern of The Wall Street Journal wrote: "Not only does 'Ender's Game' have many scenes in zero gravity, but this zero-sum fiasco has zero drama, zero suspense, zero humor, zero charm and zero appeal."

== Unrealized sequel ==
In November 2013, cast member Aramis Knight, who played Bean, said a script for Ender's Shadow existed, which Hood wanted to film concurrently with Ender's Game, but there was not enough money. Hood discussed a potential sequel as well, noting the Children of the Fleet novel may be more desirable as a follow-up than the next novel in the series, Speaker for the Dead. Given the first film's poor box office opening, a sequel was immediately considered unlikely, confirmed when the movie finished its box office run with a projected loss of $68 million for the studio.

== See also ==
- List of films featuring space stations

== Works cited ==
- Patches, Matt (October 30, 2013). "Endgame: The 'Unfilmable' Ender's Game's 28 Years in Development Hell". Hollywood Prospectus (on Grantland).
