= Ender Wiggin =

Fictional character by Orson Scott Card

- Ender's Game character
- First appearance: "Ender's Game"
- Last appearance: Ender in Exile
- Created by: Orson Scott Card
- Portrayed by: Asa Butterfield (film); Kirby Heyborne (audio play)
- Voiced by: Ryōta Ōsaka (film, Japanese dub)

In-universe information
- Aliases: Speaker for the Dead, Ender the Xenocide
- Occupation: Soldier, Speaker for the Dead
- Family: John Paul Wiggin (father); Theresa Wiggin (mother); Peter Wiggin (brother); Valentine Wiggin (sister)
- Spouses: Novinha Ribeira
- Children: Miro Ribeira (step-son); Ela Ribeira (step-daughter); Quim Ribeira (step-son); Olhado Ribeira (step-son); Quara Ribeira (step-daughter); Grego Ribeira (step-son)

Andrew "Ender" Thomas Wiggin is a fictional character from Orson Scott Card's 1985 science fiction novel Ender's Game and its sequels (Speaker for the Dead, Xenocide, Children of the Mind, Ender in Exile), as well as in the first part of a spin-off series, Ender's Shadow. The book series itself is an expansion of Card's 1977 short story "Ender's Game."

In the 2013 film adaptation of Ender's Game, Ender is portrayed by Asa Butterfield.

== Ender's Game ==
In the first book of the series, Ender's Game, Ender is the youngest and most well-rounded of three children; his parents received permission to have a third child, which is rare because of the state's strict two-child policy. His existence was called for by a program aiming at producing commanders for humanity's war against the Formics, or "Buggers".

Ender is bullied at school for being a "Third", particularly by a bully named Stilson. After Stilson engages him in a fight, Ender beats him up so severely that the boy is hospitalized and subsequently dies, although Ender does not learn of this until much later. Ender is tormented by his brother Peter, a sadist, who resents the attention Ender gets from the military. His sister, Valentine, is his protector and only friend. When he is accepted into Battle School, he is brokenhearted at leaving her, but she assures him that they will always have a bond.

Battle School is an Earth-orbiting space station that trains and evaluates military child prodigies, with the goal of finding the leader they need to win the war. Ender is exposed to significant emotional anguish and physical danger, but it soon becomes clear that he is an exceptional individual, even among the elite students. Ender excels in academics, his main interest being a team-based three-dimensional laser tag competition in the zero-g Battle Room. He becomes a masterly player and strategist, and is eventually assigned command of Dragon Army. He molds this group of unwanted students into the most successful army in the history of the school.

Ender's unprecedented success engenders his fellow commanders' jealousy, who subject him to torment. The lead bully, Bonzo, attempts to kill Ender in the shower, but fails. Ender kills Bonzo without knowing it.

With time running short, he is transferred directly to Command School on Eros, bypassing other schools Battle School graduates would normally attend. There he trains in interstellar fleet combat with holographic simulators. After Ender masters the game, it changes from one with direct control of ships to one where he relays commands to his classmates from Battle School: Julian "Bean" Delphiki, Alai, Shen, Petra Arkanian, Dink Meeker, Crazy Tom, Hot Soup, Fly Molo, Vlad, Dumper, and Carn Carby. Under the tutelage of Mazer Rackham, the legendary savior of humanity in the previous war, Ender and his trusted companions take on a grueling series of ever more difficult battle simulations and emerge victorious every time.

The final battle takes place above a planet against an enemy with an overwhelming numerical superiority. Ender perceives this as an unfair test and resolves to break the rules. Worn down almost to the point of breaking, he thinks this will convince his instructors that he is not the person to lead the Fleet into battle against the Formics. Instead of fighting a hopeless battle against the enemy, Ender orders his squadron leaders to conduct a series of seemingly purposeless skirmishes. The enemy does not realize until too late that Ender's fleet is gradually drawing closer to the planet. When Ender's surviving ships are close enough, he sends them to destroy the planet itself using Doctor Device, a weapon that destroys matter, but only if it is concentrated enough. Only a few ships manage to get close enough, but they destroy the planet. Afterwards, he is told that it was not a simulation; he and his classmates had been unknowingly issuing orders to real ships in real battles. The last battle destroyed the Bugger homeworld and eradicated the Bugger species. Ender is hailed as a hero, but he is stricken with guilt for having unknowingly committed speciocide.

His subordinates are returned to Earth to their various home countries, but Ender is too potent for any one country to have. War would break out over him. So, Peter, who is becoming a major political force on Earth, brokers a deal in which his brother is sent into permanent exile. Ender journeys with his sister Valentine to one of the colonies being established on the now-abandoned Bugger worlds. Once there, he discovers a fertilized pupa of a Queen Bugger, hidden in a place that the Buggers designed for him to discover by modeling it to resemble part of an interactive computer game he played during his years in Battle School, which they found out during his dreams of them in Command School. The pupal Queen is capable of restoring the Bugger species. Through rudimentary telepathic communication with the Queen, he learns that the entire conflict had been a mistake arising from the inability of the two species to establish communication with each other. He also learns from the Queen that the Buggers regretted having mistakenly fought humans and forgive Ender for destroying their world. Ender promises to find the Queen a home to reestablish her people in safety.

Ender writes a book anonymously called The Hive Queen, which tells the story of the war from the Formic perspective and starts to change public opinion of him. Peter, who has become the Hegemon, the head of the world government on Earth, recognizes Ender as the author and asks him to write a second work, about him. Ender authors The Hegemon. The two books become very influential, and eventually they are always published together. Ender and Valentine begin to search for a planet where the Queen can restore her race.

== Speaker for the Dead ==
Speaker for the Dead begins 3000 years after the events of Ender's Game and the Xenocide. Ender is departing from the planet where Valentine has found a husband. He has acquired an integrated computer by which he communicates with a powerful sentient program known as Jane. She reveals herself only to Ender. He has taken the role of Speaker for the Dead, keeping his real identity a secret. A Speaker for the Dead volunteers to try to make sense of the life of a deceased individual for the bereaved. Thanks to his portrayal of himself in his books, The Hive Queen and The Hegemon, Ender is despised as a xenocide: the killer of an entire intelligent species.

Ender departs for the planet Lusitania, where a request has been made to speak on behalf of a researcher who has died from contact with the planet's indigenous species, the piggies. When he arrives at the planet 22 years later (relativity having aged him less than two weeks), he finds that the original call for a Speaker has been rescinded. Two other requests, however, have been made to speak for more recent deaths. Ender discovers that both calls originated from the same family; the first from Novinha's daughter Ela, requesting someone speak for the death of Novinha's husband Marcos, and the second from Novinha's eldest son Miro, who has asked for a speaker for the researcher Libo.

Ender begins to investigate Marcos and has frequent contact with Novinha's family. His approach endears him to most of the children as a father figure. He discovers that Marcos was abusive to his wife. While in dialogue with the Children of the Mind, the planet's religious monastic order, he is annoyed by Jane's commentary and turns off his connection to her. Jane, without consulting Ender, sends incriminating reports to the interstellar authorities, who order the arrest of Miro and Ouanda, the researchers who have been investigating the piggies. The colony's charter is canceled, and the colonists are forced to rely on Ender for guidance.

Meanwhile, Ender has been receiving pressure from the Hive-Queen's pupa to allow her to settle on this world because she has been in telepathic contact with another race. Ender assumes this race is the piggies, although they seem simple and not telepathic. After the sanctions are put in place, he gets Miro and Ouanda to allow him to visit the piggies, who have been asking to meet him, the "original Speaker". Ender admits to being the original Speaker. The piggies demonstrate that the trees they grow from the corpses of those who have been ritually killed is their reproductive stage. The ritual killings of the two xenologers were misunderstandings; the piggies were under the false impression that humans reproduced in a fashion similar to themselves.

Ender "speaks" for Marcos and reveals many secrets, mostly Novinha's. Foremost among them is that Marcos was incapable of having children, and Novinha's children are offspring of Libo. This means that Miro's girlfriend Ouanda is his half-sister. Ender recommends that the colony declare itself in rebellion to sanctions from the Intergalactic Congress. He re-establishes contact with Jane, who masks their ansible signal.

He enters into a relationship with Novinha. Valentine agrees to travel to the colony. On the far side of the planet, he has discovered a site reminiscent of a dream he had in Ender's Game. With her guidance, he plants the Hive-Queen's pupa in preparation for the rebirth of the Formics.

== Xenocide ==
During the events of Xenocide, Ender is looked to as an unofficial leader by the rebel colony of Lusitania. He is helping Novinha protect humans from the descolada virus. Descolada is fatal to humans, but is essential for the piggies' life and reproduction. The Formics have an immune system that is advanced enough to protect them, and the humans have been using anti-viral dietary supplements, but both defenses are starting to fade in the face of the virus' mutations. Ender is also attempting to keep the peace on planet between the three species. The humans resent the piggies for being the reason they can't kill the descolada virus outright. The existence of the new Formic colony is not general knowledge, but Ender knows that their appearance and their non-human way of reasoning would cause friction with the humans. Novinha's youngest children Grego, a rabble-rouser among the humans, and Quara, who sees the virus as sentient and is bringing up objections to the research her mother and sister are doing, are troublesome. The piggies and the Formics are worried about the approaching human fleet, which may destroy the planet if the descolada virus is unleashed on humanity.

Research ordered by the government on another planet, Path, leads a young genius, Han Qing-jao, to deduce the existence of Jane, who is tied to the ansible system. Jane reveals herself to Qing-jao in an effort to prevent her from informing the authorities by telling her that the OCD her people suffer from was governmentally orchestrated. However, the report to the authorities is still dispatched and the government enacts a plan to temporarily deactivate the ansible network to purge Jane from the system. Qing-jao's father agrees to help with the descolada problem regardless of his daughter's actions, in exchange for a cure for the OCD that plagues them. The Lusitanian researchers agree, but though a cure is designed, it proves impossible to synthesize; they can't cure the OCD without removing the genius as well, and the counter for the descolada won't be created. Meanwhile, they deduce that Jane has the power to pull any object she knows about in great detail outside the known universe, where conscious thought has physical power.

Ender goes on the first test flight, because Jane's existence was a direct result of his time at the Battle School; therefore, Jane is most likely to be able to keep Ender's form in her mind. Since Ender has passed Jane off to Miro due to the previous misunderstanding in Speaker for the Dead, Miro must go as well. Ela goes because she is the only one with enough knowledge to produce the needed viruses. The test flight occurs with unexpected side effects. Ela produces the new viruses, but Miro also gives himself a new undamaged body. Ender inadvertently creates copies of his brother and sister from his memories. They are more based on those memories than reality; therefore, Valentine is very soft and loving, and Peter is purely evil. Horrified, Ender removes himself from further efforts so as to not risk creating more things like his pseudo-siblings.

== Children of the Mind ==
Children of the Mind begins where Xenocide left off. Ender's story revolves around his "pseudo-offspring" Peter and young Val. Ender's life force is now split between three different people. Throughout the book, Ender has a difficult time maintaining a force strong enough for all three people to live. The maximum number of people Ender can keep alive and healthy at any given time is two. In the beginning young Val suffers the most, because Ender is the least interested in her mission, until it is revealed that she, along with Miro and Jane, are looking for the home planet of the descolada virus. Peter never has to compete for Ender's life force because Ender is interested in Peter's mission to prevent the Lusitania fleet from using the Molecular Disruption Device on Lusitania. When Ender is fully invested in Peter and young Val, Ender himself begins to deteriorate. This causes Ender to collapse while working in the monastery garden, falling in and out of consciousness for the remainder of the book until his death. Ender's physical manifestation is gone, but his life force continues through Peter (young Val gives up her physical manifestation for Jane and her life force continues through Peter as well).

== Ender in Exile ==
A book that chronicles the lost years between Ender's Game and Speaker for the Dead, Ender in Exile tells of Ender's initial set-off from Eros, the long journey to the first colony, Shakespeare, as well as his trip to the colony of Ganges. The court-martial of Hyrum Graff is expanded upon; some light is shed on Graff's life after he was made Minister of Colonization, as well as Mazer Rackham's travels after the Formic War. After defeating the Formics, Ender remains on Eros.

Throughout the voyage to Shakespeare, Admiral Morgan attempts to usurp Ender's lawful position as Governor of Shakespeare. Dorabella seduces Admiral Morgan and tries to use her daughter, Alessandra, to seduce Ender, hoping that, through her own marriage to Morgan and Alessandra's to Ender, Morgan can rule Shakespeare using Ender as a puppet.

Upon arrival at Shakespeare, Ender easily crushes Morgan's attempted coup, with help from Hyrum Graff back on Earth. Ender liberates Alessandra from her mother. After two years as governor, and after completing The Hive Queen and The Hegemon, Ender convinces Valentine to move on.

Ender's first stop, at the request of Hyrum Graff, is the Hindu colony of Ganges, which is governed by Virlomi, a former Battle School student who caused an uprising in India before she was subdued and exiled by Peter Wiggin's Hegemony. Once there, Ender agrees to help Virlomi quell an uprising by a group called the Natives of Ganges, led by a young man named Randall Firth, who is under the delusion that he is the son of Achilles de Flandres. They have adopted "The Hive Queen" as a rallying cry, and have begun to belittle the name of Ender Wiggin, coining the phrase "Ender the Xenocide".

Ender and Randall engage in physical combat, which leaves Ender near death. Ender reveals Randall's true parentage (two of Ender's old friends and squadron commanders, Julian 'Bean' Delphiki and Petra Arkanian Delphiki Wiggin), after which Randall renounces his secret name, Achilles, and renames himself Arkanian Delphiki. Ender reunites Randall and his mother by way of the ansible.
