= Xenocide =

1991 novel by Orson Scott Card

- Cover of first edition (hardcover)
- Author: Orson Scott Card
- Cover artist: John Harris
- Language: English
- Series: Ender's Game series
- Genre: Science fiction
- Published: 1991 (Legend), 1992 (Tor Books)
- Publication place: United States
- Media type: Print (Hardcover, Paperback & ebook)
- Pages: 592
- Dewey Decimal: 813/.54 20
- LC Class: PS3553.A655 X46 1991
- Preceded by: Speaker for the Dead
- Followed by: Children of the Mind

Xenocide (first published in 1991) is the third book in the Ender's Game series, a science fiction series by the American author Orson Scott Card. It was first published during a period of increasing globalization and heightened awareness of cultural differences, and the writing reflects this in its techniques, mood, and emotive effect on the reader. Xenocide explores themes of communication, xenophobia, and the potential dangers of advanced technology.

Xenocide was nominated for both the Hugo Award and Locus Awards for Best Novel in 1992.

== Background ==
Card incorporated elements from his earlier publication, Gloriously Bright, from the January 1991 issue of Analog Science Fiction and Fact, into the novel.

Xenocide refers to the "killing or attempted killing of an entire alien species."

'Xeno-' comes from the Greek word for "stranger, foreigner, or host;"

'-cide' is a word-forming element meaning "killing." From French -cide and Latin -cidium meaning "a cutting, a killing."

== Plot summary ==
In Xenocide, the third book in Orson Scott Card's Ender's Game series, the planet Lusitania faces annihilation as the Starways Congress sends a fleet armed with the deadly "Molecular Disruption Device" to destroy it. The planet is home to the alien species Pequeninos, the sentient insect Hive Queen, and humans—including Ender Wiggin and his family–and the planet's inhabitants must race to find solutions to this existential threat. Meanwhile, the genetically engineered inhabitants of the planet Path grapple with their religious devotion and mental conditioning as they uncover the secrets of their oppression. As the Lusitanians work to neutralize the Descolada virus—vital to the planet's ecosystem but deadly to humans—they also uncover the nature of faster-than-light travel using the mysterious force known as the "Outside." Through this discovery, they transport the endangered species and themselves to safety, thwarting the Congress's fleet and preserving their world.

== Reception ==
Xenocide received recognition in the science fiction community with nominations for the Hugo Award and the Locus Award for Best Novel in 1992.

The New York Times Book Review offered a mixed assessment of Xenocide in 1991. The review recognized the novel's ambitious philosophical themes but also criticized its pacing and dialogue, suggesting that the complex ideas could have been more impactful in a more concise format.

== See also ==
- List of Ender's Game characters
- Orson Scott Card bibliography
