= List of Ender's Game characters =

This literature-related list is incomplete; you can help by to include characters from the First Formic War trilogy.

This is a partial list of characters in the Ender's Game series.

== Wiggin family ==
- Andrew "Ender" Wiggin is the protagonist of the Ender quintet and is present in the Bean quartet. He is enlisted in the International Fleet's Battle School for his strategic ability and leadership skills. He is eventually tricked into leading battles in the war against the Formics, resulting in the almost-complete destruction of that race. He spends most of his life attempting to find absolution for his unknowing act of "xenocide" by becoming a Speaker for the Dead.
- Peter Wiggin is Ender's older brother. A sociopath, he takes sadistic pleasure in manipulating and brutalizing other children, especially Ender. Peter is rejected from Battle School ostensibly due to his violence, but it is later revealed that his rejection was due to Graff believing that his men would never love him as a commander. In Ender's Game, he helps end a global war (with Valentine's reluctant assistance). In later books, he becomes Hegemon of the free world and founds the Free People of Earth, the Enderverse's first world government.
- Valentine Wiggin is Ender's older sister, being the middle child of the Wiggin family. Rejected from Battle School for being too sensitive, she serves as the intermediary between Ender and Peter during the former's childhood. Later, she helps Peter on his rise to power by becoming "Demosthenes", an essayist whose rabble-rousing demagoguery is contrasted strongly against Peter's statesmanlike essays as "Locke". After the end of the Formic War, she leaves with Ender on an odyssey through time and space, turning Demosthenes into a historian whose essays are considered the definitive word on whatever subject they address. After marrying on the planet Trondheim, she eventually uproots her family to follow Ender to Lusitania, where she helps to defuse the onrushing Lusitania Fleet and save the alien inhabitants from xenocide.
- John Paul Wiggin and Theresa Wiggin are Ender's parents. Ender's Game portrays them as being dull and oblivious despite the genius children they raised. However, both characters were expanded upon in later works and revealed to be more intelligent than even their children imagined. John Paul is Catholic and Theresa is Mormon. Furthermore, Colonel Graff revealed that Ender's father was baptized with the surname Wieczorek, hinting at his Polish roots, and was born the seventh of nine children, a serious offense in the Enderverse's overpopulation sanctions, both of which he has cast himself away from. It is also later revealed that John Paul was originally accepted to Battle School, but he declined, causing Graff to move him to America in the hopes that he might marry someone brilliant and foster children worthy of leading the war against the Formics.

== Battle School students ==
=== Ender's army ===
Ender's army is a collection of his closest friends at Battle School, particularly those who serve under him in the Dragon Army in Battle School before serving as team leads under his command during the Third Invasion, ending with the destruction of the Formic homeworld. As chronicled in the Bean Quartet, many of them move into positions of international significance during the chaotic years after the end of the Formic War, particularly due to the machinations of Achilles de Flandres. Ender's jeesh is the group that works under Ender in fighting the Formics.

- Alai (pronounced ah-lie) is a Muslim of North African descent. In Battle School, he was an exceptional student, adroit in the battle room, and was one of the first children to befriend Ender, with the word "salaam" and a kiss on the cheek. They became the best of friends. He also helped lead the special training sessions Ender conducted, and later, during the Third Invasion, became one of the most trusted members of Ender's jeesh, due to his innate talent. After his return to Earth, he is eventually elected Caliph of a unified Muslim world.
- Bean is a student of Greek and Igbo descent from the streets of Rotterdam. Though the smallest and youngest member of the jeesh, he is also the smartest and most fair-minded. Ender initially notes that he isolates Bean as Ender himself was once isolated to force Bean to flourish. Though only a supporting character in Ender's Game, Bean (real name Julian Delphiki II) is the lead character of the parallel storyline book series known as the "Bean Quartet" or "Shadow Quartet", revealing his role as the behind-the-scenes facilitator of most of the main events of that time period (the victory against the Formics, the uniting of Earth under Peter Wiggin, and so on); being "behind the scenes" is a central theme in these works.
- Dink Meeker is a Battle School student of Dutch descent. He is portrayed as one of those who refuses to play the teacher's game. He says that he was offered command of an army twice, but refused to play. He was paranoid about the game, convinced that the teachers were the enemy and that the Bugger War was fake so that all children with the ability for command were in the hands of the International Fleet; however, he loved the game, so he stayed as a toon leader. Eventually, he agreed to become a commander in Ender's Shadow.
- Carn Carby is an Australian veteran who commands Rabbit Army. In the original short story version of Ender's Game, Ender held a low opinion of him: In the novel, when Bean was transferred into Rabbit Army, Ender says, "How can they put you under an idiot like Carby!", but in the expanded novel, Ender's reply is, "Carby's a good man; I hope he recognizes you for what you're worth." Carby's Rabbit Army was the first to battle Ender's Dragon Army and was beaten badly. When Carby told the other commanders of Ender's new tactics, they didn't believe him, so Carby told Ender "to beat the snot out of them" in battle, as a personal favor. His honest and sympathetic behavior made Ender "mentally [add] him to his private list of people who also qualified as human beings". He is transferred to Command School and serves under Ender during the Third Invasion, one of the few Army members who were never in an army with Ender during Battle School.
- Crazy Tom is a British student. He is a veteran soldier who leads "C" Toon in Dragon Army. He got his nickname due to his temperament, as he couldn't stand working under commanders he considered stupid. He wrecked rooms and once sent a message to every kid in the school about how bad his commander was.
- Dumper is the leader of "E" toon in Dragon Army. He is described by Bean as being among the most worshipful of Ender. Along with the other toon leaders, he is part of Ender's jeesh. He is of Peruvian descent, and his real name is Champi T'it'u.
- Fly Molo is a Filipino veteran soldier who leads "A" Toon in Dragon Army. He is portrayed initially as being contemptuous of Ender's five-toon formation but later accepts it as wise, after arguing the concept with Bean. He was acting blatantly insubordinate and saying that it was a real "loser strategy", and when Bean stood up for Ender, who was at the time a very young commander, he got mad and almost hurt Bean, but finally, he had to accept that Bean was smarter than he was and that it was a good strategy.
- Han Tzu (nicknamed Hot Soup) is a veteran soldier from China who leads "D" Toon in Dragon Army. Eventually, he was shipped to Command School to become a member of Ender's Army and was one of the commanders that served under him during the end of the Formic War. After the war, Han Tzu returned to China before being kidnapped by Achilles. He later returned and became involved in military planning. He is the subject of the 2006 short story 'Cheater' and a descendant of Yuan Shikai.
- Petra Arkanian is an Armenian student who is the only female in the jeesh. During Earth's invasion of the Bugger worlds, Ender relies on her heavily, often giving her complicated and critical assignments; she is the first student to burn out, falling asleep during a battle. She is a major character later on in the Shadow Series. She and Bean travel around the world to stay alive and eventually get married. Together they have children (nine embryos, one implanted in Petra and the other eight stolen by Achilles; all but one are recovered by the end of Shadow of the Giant) and facilitate the downfall of Achilles.
- Shen is a Japanese student who is part of Ender's group of launchies. He is introduced as the kid who has a big butt that wriggles when he walks and is constantly mocked by Bernard and his gang. Ender steps in and sends a number of messages under pseudonyms (such as "Cover your butt. Bernard is watching. - God") to break Bernard's control over the room. He becomes Ender's first friend in Battle School. He later guides Bean and tells him why the students love Ender.
- Vlad was born in Belarus under the New Warsaw Pact. He is known as being a solid student who was always passed up in favor of more ambitious students in the various Battle School armies. Vlad is one of the 40 students chosen to serve in the Dragon Army under Ender's command, where he is made leader of "B" Toon. Vlad is one of the eleven students chosen to be in Ender's jeesh, helping command the warships of the International Fleet against the Formics in the Third Invasion.

=== Other Battle School students ===
- Achilles de Flandres is the main villain of the Bean Quartet. Like Bean, he grew up in Rotterdam, an orphan on the streets; like Peter, he displays sociopathic tendencies, particularly by murdering anyone who has ever seen or made him helpless. During the years after the Formic War, he takes steps to begin unifying the world under his rule, causing a series of costly wars between India, China, Russia, a united Islam, and large parts of Europe and southeast Asia. He gets assassinated at the end of Shadow Puppets by Bean after he gets tricked by Suriyawong who didn't kill Bean as promised.
- Suriyawong is a Battle School grad from Thailand who becomes Bean's friend during the wars caused by Achilles. He was known as "Surly" due to his pugilistic disposition, but during his time with Bean, he develops into a mature and capable commander.
- Virlomi is a Battle School grad from India who is instrumental in rousting Achilles from his power base in India. In Shadow Puppets, as the conflict between China and India increases, she returns to rural India to devise and encourage civil disobedience there, where she begins to cultivate a divine image. In Ender in Exile, she becomes governor of an Indian colony on the planet Ganges.
- William Bee is a minor character who is primarily notable due to his involvement in one of the more unusual battles in the "Battle Room". In the Battle School's first numerically handicapped battle, Ender Wiggin, commander of Dragon Army, was required to face both Bee's Griffin Army, as well as Talo Momoe's Tiger Army.
- Bernard is part of Ender's launch group and treats the precocious Ender with great contempt (mostly because Ender had broken Bernard's arm on the shuttle to the Battle School). Bernard is also seen as a ringleader and the main antagonist in the first few chapters of the book, and he takes great delight in picking on Ender and Shen, a young boy who is also in the launch group. However, his stranglehold on the clique falls apart when Ender and Alai become friends in the battle room, and after Ender manages to hack into the computer system and posts a message saying "Cover your butts, Bernard is watching," signed "God". Later Ender also writes another note, seemingly by Bernard, saying "I love your butt, let me kiss it. - Bernard." Bernard is one of the six students who accompanies Bonzo Madrid when he fights Ender in the bathroom.
- Nikolai Delphiki is a major character of the book Ender's Shadow and a side character in Shadow of the Hegemon by Orson Scott Card. Nikolai is one of twenty-four fertilized eggs produced by Greek natives Elena Delphiki and Julian Delphiki Sr. A defect in one of Elena's fallopian tube and an ectopic pregnancy in the other made it impossible for her to conceive. In their hopes for a child, Elena had several eggs taken out, and Julian's sperm was harvested to produce numerous fertilized eggs. The healthiest were cloned, and then the twenty-four healthiest of those were chosen. One was implanted, producing Nikolai.
- Bonzo Madrid is an antagonistic supporting character, serving to bring out Ender's brutal nature while at Battle School. Bonzo, whose real name is Bonito de Madrid, is described as a strikingly beautiful boy of aristocratic Spanish lineage from the town of Cartagena. As commander of Salamander Army, the autocratic Bonzo suddenly has Ender Wiggin thrust upon him when Ender is promoted from his launch group. He is accidentally killed in a confrontation with Ender, bringing six students with him to attack Ender in a bathroom. In the 2013 film adaptation, he survives with a career-ending head injury.
- Talo Momoe is the commander of one of the numerous armies at Battle School. He is paired up with William Bee's army in a battle against Ender's undefeated Dragon Army. Momoe favors a very direct approach, and argues with Bee that, because they outnumber Ender, they should do a frontal assault. Bee's disagreement leads to a prolonged war of words. After Ender comes out with a formation, Momoe orders his army to rebound and assault the army directly.
- Rose de Nose, although his first name is Rosen, is the commander of Rat Army when Ender is transferred there. Rose de Nose is also the only Jewish commander at the time in Battle School, which he uses as a crutch of sorts, as military legend has it that Jewish commanders never lose. Rose de Nose treats Ender with considerably more decency than does Bonzo Madrid, the commander of Ender's first army, Salamander Army. He is also much more lax about rules; the Rat Army barracks are messy when compared to the discipline and order of Salamander. Rose attempts to impose rules on Ender, but Dink Meeker tells Ender not to listen. As a result, Rose sends Ender out on what is, in essence, a suicide run at the beginning of Ender's first battle with Rat Army so that he will get immediately frozen. Instead, due to his unique "legs first" strategy, he is able to disable or freeze many of the enemies' soldiers to give Rat Army a sizable advantage. Rose gives up picking on Ender, and leaves him to do things his own way. By the time Ender and his group of companions rise to prominence, Rose de Nose has already graduated from Battle School.
- Pol Slattery is a commander who Ender faces twice at Battle School. In their first known battle, Ender was still a soldier in Bonzo's Salamander Army and Slattery was the new commander of the lowly Leopard Army. What everyone expected to be an easy battle turned into an upset by Slattery. Ender, who had been given orders by Bonzo to stay in the corridor until four minutes after everyone had gone through and then stay in the corner of the battle room, begins to observe Slattery's strategies and is impressed. Despite being young, Slattery is sharp and has new ideas; he always keeping his army moving against the stolid Salamanders who are unable to adapt to the situation. Eventually Leopard annihilates the entire Salamander Army, not including Ender. When Slattery is about to send his remaining men to open the gates, Ender ambushes them and takes out enough men to end the game in a draw. Despite helping Salamander Army achieve a tie, Bonzo is furious at Ender for disobeying his orders and would later cause more troubles for Ender.
- Zeck Morgan (Zechariah Morgan) is an American boy, mentioned only in the novella, A War of Gifts. Zeck is a member of Rat army, but due to his orthodox Christian upbringing, is a pacifist and refuses to fire in the Battleroom. Throughout the novella, he comes into conflict with Dink and Ender, ruining Dink's latest rebellion, but at the end, he is accepted as a person and treated as such. His future after Battle School's closing is unknown.
- Pinual is a minor character mentioned briefly when Ender encounters the Giant's Drink puzzle in the "Mind Game", a fantasy game meant to evaluate the students personality for the benefit of the Battle School teachers and commanders. Major Anderson mentions that Ender seems like Pinual because he keeps returning to the Giant's Drink, to which Hyrum Graff replies that "Everybody looks like Pinual at one time or another. But he's the only one who killed himself." When Ender returns to Earth after Bonzo Madrid's death, Major Imbu mentions that Pinual is the only student in the history of the Battle School to have committed suicide.
- Wu is the only girl in Dragon Army. She is given the nickname "Woo-hoo" during her time in battle school. Because of her name, she is most likely of Asian origin. She is one of the few soldiers whom Bean managed to nab for the Dragon Army roster. Wu is a brilliant soldier both academically and physically, but always refuses to become a Toon Leader. When a commander asks her to, she puts in a transfer request and refuses to fight until it is granted.

== International Fleet personnel ==
- Colonel Hyrum Graff is the principal of Battle School, and personally supervised much of Ender's training. After the war he is put on trial for his controversial actions there, but is given a position within the Hegemony as Minister of Colonization, responsible for sending humanity out to colonize the now-deserted worlds formerly held by the Formics. In the film, he is played by Harrison Ford.
- Mazer Rackham is the half-Māori captain who singlehandedly stopped the Second Invasion by realizing that the Buggers are a hive mind. Due to his inability to pass on his knowledge, he was forced to spend fifty years at relativistic speeds (eight years for Rackham) so that he could train the next commander, Ender Wiggin. After the end of the war, he joins Graff's crusade to keep the human race from destroying itself. In the film, he is played by Ben Kingsley.
- Major Anderson was Graff's second-in-command at Battle School, generally seen in the epistolary conversations from Ender's Game attempting to moderate his superior's unorthodox training of Ender. His passion is the Battle Room; after the war's end, he accepts the post of commissioner for an American football league, and does not appear in the latter three books of either the Ender or Bean quartets. In the film, Major Gwen Anderson is a psychologist who looks after the Battle School students, and is portrayed by Viola Davis.
- Admiral Chamrajnagar is the ranking Admiral at Eros, the International Fleet's headquarters, during the final stages of the Formic War; he was not Polemarch during that time, but has assumed that post by the time Achilles de Flandres begins his power plays.

== Other Ender's Game characters ==
- The Hive Queen is the physical embodiment of the central consciousness of the Formics.
- Victor Delgado is a mechanic born on the free mining ship El Cavador, that mined asteroids in the Kuiper Belt. When the Formic's scout ship was discovered and deemed as a real threat, he was sent on a quick ship to Luna to report the news. On Luna, he was promptly arrested, but freed by Imala. After, he and Imala began teaming up with Lem Jukes to infiltrate the Formic ship and were successful in doing so. They were able to replicate the infiltration mission with a team of MOPs and were successful in destroying the Formic scout ship.
- Jane is an AI that exists within the ansible network.
- Stilson is a bully in Ender's Game. In the very first chapter of the book, he and three friends gang up on Ender, who decides to win thoroughly. Ender's counterattacks are so effective that Stilson, unbeknownst to Ender, suffers enough injuries to later die in hospital.

== Characters introduced in Speaker for the Dead ==
Characters from the planet Lusitania as introduced in the book Speaker for the Dead.

=== Figueira family ===
- Pipo Figueira (PEE-po fee-GAY-ra; born João Figueira Alvarez; died 1948) is the first xenologer of Lusitania. He is one of the few people on the planet who treats Novinha as a real person, and becomes her beloved father-figure during her teenage years. He is the first human killed by the piggies, an alien species, and his death prompts Novinha to call for a speaker for the dead.
- Conceição Figueira, is Pipo's wife and the archivist of Lusitania.
- Libo (LEE-bo; Liberdade Graças a Deus Figueira de Medici; 1931–1965) is Pipo's son and the xenologer after his death. Libo is Novinha's first love. Unfortunately, like his father he is vivisected by the pequeninos. His apprentice, Miro, calls for a speaking of his death, which Ender performs. Libo is the father of Novinha's children.
  - Pipinho (João) is Libo's sibling.
  - Maria (d. 1936) was Libo's sibling who died of the Descolada.
  - Bimba (Abençoada) is Libo's sibling.
  - Patinha (Isolde) is Libo's sibling.
  - Rã (Tomãs) is Libo's sibling.
- Bruxinha (Portuguese for "little witch"; born Cleopatra Figueira) is Libo's wife.
- Ouanda Quenhatta Figueira Mucumbi (b. 1951), is Libo and Bruxinha's eldest child and a xenologer, who falls in love with Miro.
  - China Figueira is Ouanda's sibling.
  - Prega Figueira is Ouanda's sibling.
  - Zinha Figueira is Ouanda's sibling.

=== Os Venerados family ===
- Gusto (Vladimir Tiago Gussman; d. 1936) was Cida's husband, Novinha's father, and a xenobiologist of Lusitania. He helped cure the Descolada virus before succumbing to it. He and his wife Cida were known as Os Venerados after their beatification.
- Cida (Ekaterina Maria Aparecida do Norte von Hesse-Gussman; d 1936) was Gusto's wife, Novinha's mother, and a xenobiologist of Lusitania. She helped cure the Descolada virus before succumbing to it themselves. She and her husband were known as Os Venerados after their beatification.
- Novinha (no-VEEN-ya; born Ivanova Santa Catarina von Hesse; b. 1931) is the daughter of Lusitania's xenobiologists. Orphaned, Novinha became distant and formal until finding a scientific sanctuary with Pipo and Libo. Though she and Libo are in love, she refuses to marry and give him legal access to her xenobiology files, which she believes caused Pipo's death. She instead marries the abusive Marcão. Her pain, sorrow, and isolation draws Ender Wiggin to Lusitania, and the two eventually marry. Despite this, Novinha never loses her fragility and fear of losing those dearest to her.
  - Mingo (d. 1936) was Novinha's sibling who died of the Descolada.
  - Amado (d. 1936) was Novinha's sibling who died of the Descolada.
  - Guti (d. 1936) was Novinha's sibling who died of the Descolada.
- Marcão (mar-COWNG; born Marcos Maria Ribeira; aka "Big Marcos"; d. 1970), is Novinha's late husband. He is known for his fearsome stature, surly temper, and habit of beating his wife, traits which earned him the epithet "cão", dog; he dies a few weeks before Ender arrives at Lusitania, of a congenital disease which caused his glands to turn to fatty tissues. Among other things, this rendered him sterile, and it is revealed during Ender's speaking of his death that none of Novinha's children are actually his, but rather Libo's; the two agreed to this form of cuckoldry before getting married.
- Miro (MIE-roe; Marcos Vladimir Ribeira von Hesse; b. 1951) is Novinha's eldest child. He follows Libo into xenology and falls in love with Ouanda, Libo's firstborn daughter by his (actual) wife. In response to this and other factors, he attempts to cross the nerve-stimulating fence separating the piggies from the human compound, suffering brain damage and becoming crippled. He is sent out into space to greet Valentine Wiggin and her family, and later becomes a key player in the events leading up to the almost-second Xenocide. Miro is later healed by Jane.
- Ela (EH-la; Ekaterina Elanora Ribeira von Hesse, b. 1952) is Novinha's second child. Like all the females in her line, she becomes a xenobiologist, and is one of the first members of the Ribeira family to warm to Ender. Later in life, she is instrumental in the destruction of the descolada virus, and its replacement with a far-more-benign variant, the recolada.
- Quim (KEENG; Estevão Rei Ribeira von Hesse; b.1955) is Novinha's third child. He is extremely pious and at first resists Andrew Wiggin on grounds of his atheistic avocation, but later warms to the Speaker, partially for his reputation as a crusader. He later becomes the first Christian evangelist to the pequeninos and holds great respect among them, but is martyred by a particularly heretical forest who believe that the descolada is the Holy Ghost and that it is the pequeninos' duty to judge all humans with it.
- Olhado (ol-YAH-doe; Lauro Suleimão Ribeira von Hesse, b. 1958) is Novinha's fourth child. He is also called "the guy with the eyes", because a freak laser accident blinded him in his youth, requiring the implant of metal replacements. He has reduced binocular vision and depth perception but can plug a computer jack directly into one eye to upload visual recordings. Due to the resulting ostracism, he becomes a keen observer of human nature and interaction. Later in life he becomes a brickmaker (or at least a manager of them) because, to him, family is a far more important calling than the sciences that took his relatives; nonetheless he has revolutionary ways of looking at physics and metaphysics, and is crucial in the development of faster-than-light travel (via a modified hyperspace mechanic related to philotic theory). Like Ela, he quickly warms to Ender; as he relates to Valentine in Xenocide, his greatest secret is that, while alone with Ender, they call each other "Father" and "Son".
- Quara (KWA-rah; Lembrança das Milagres de Jesus Ribeira von Hesse, 1963) is Novinha's fifth child. Throughout her life she exhibits stubbornness and contrariness, generally doing whatever the people who love her don't want her to do. She also becomes a xenobiologist, and assists Ela in "truncating" the descolada, despite discovering that the virus is quite possibly sentient and is certainly able to communicate with other individuals of its species.
- Grego (GRE-goe; Gerão Gregorio Ribeira von Hesse, b. 1964) is Novinha's sixth child, only six years old when Ender arrives. As a child he showed a disturbing capacity for destruction, modeled on his father's habit of domestic violence, a temper which does not subside during later years. After Quim's death, he attempts to whip a mob into a frenzy to attack the responsible forest, only to have them jump on the nearest one to hand Human and Rooter's forest after being chewed out by Valentine, Grego tries to end the massacre with as little bloodshed as possible, eventually placing himself between the surviving piggies and his own riot. He later collaborates with Olhado on faster-than-light travel.

=== Other colonists ===
- Bosquinha (Faria Lima Maria do Bosque) is governor of Lusitania and mayor of the colony Milagre.
- Peregrino (Armão Cebola) is the Bishop of the Catholic church of Lusitania.
- Dom Cristão (Amai a Tudomundo Para Que Deus Vos Ame, Portuguese for Ye Must Love Everyone So That God Will Love You) is the abbott the Filhos de Mente de Cristo, Children of the Mind of Christ.
- Dona Cristã (Detestai o Pecado e Fazei o Direito, Portuguese for Hate Sin and Do the Right) is the principal monk of the order of the Children of the Mind of Christ.

=== Pequeninos ===
The Pequeninos (Portuguese for "Little Ones"), also known as Lusitanian Aborigines or piggies, are an alien species in the category ramen, or sentient non-human. They are forest-dwelling and technologically primitive, but incredibly intelligent species able to learn languages extremely quickly. They are given the nickname "piggy" by the colonists of the planet Lusitania where part of the series is set due to their pig-like appearance.

- Rooter: One of the first pequeninos introduced in the series, Rooter was the most inquisitive of the piggies and had a strong relationship with Libo before he was abruptly brought into his third life as a father-tree.
- Mandachuva: When Pipo discovered that the Descolada virus, which had nearly destroyed the human population of Lusitania, was a part of the pequeninos' normal physiology, he went to share that information with the pequeninos. The pequenino Mandachuva brought that news back to the wives, along with the implication that the humans were not all-powerful and godlike, and that in some respects pequeninos were even more powerful than humans. It was a revelation to be rewarded, but when Pipo was asked to bring Mandachuva to the "third life", Pipo, not understanding the nature of pequenino transformation, thought he was being asked to kill Mandachuva. He refused, preferring to lose his own life in the process. Mandachuva, and the pequeninos in general, thought that they were rewarding Pipo by killing him, bringing him on to his third life, not understanding that no such thing existed for humans. The first crisis in human-pequenino relations occurred with the death of the first xenologer, Pipo Figueira, at the hands of the pequeninos.
- Leaf-eater: Seventeen years after the incident involving Pipo and Mandachuva, the new xenologer and Pipo's son, Libo Figueira, suffered a similar fate. The piggy Leaf-eater had convinced the wives to let many more little mothers conceive than normal and then convinced Libo to help them out with the famine that they were sure to face. It was an enormous risk because if Libo refused to help that whole generation of pequeinos would have starved, but the humans did in fact step in and provide assistance. After the first amaranth harvest, Libo was, like Pipo before him, asked to bring Leaf-eater to the third life, and, like his father, refused, thinking that he was saving Leaf-eater's life. Leaf-eater killed Libo, thinking on his part that he was helping Libo achieve his third life even though humans did not have a third life.
- Human: One of the sons of Rooter. Human was offered a chance to be brought into the third life as a fathertree, but only if Ender performed the ritual. Like Pipo and Libo before him, Ender showed extreme distaste at the concept, but he managed to do so with a full understanding of the consequences of his actions. Soon after, Ender wrote a biography called "Life of Human" in memory of his friend. The name "Human" was given to him by the Pequeninos "because he was very smart".
- Star-looker: One of the wives. She represented the pequeninos in their treaty with the humans. She is also called "Shouter" by the brothers behind her back because of her loud voice.
- Warmaker: A pequenino that died and entered the "third life" as a tree. He convinced a tribe of Pequeninos that the Descolada virus was a form of the Holy Ghost of Christ and that it should be spread to all humans on the Hundred Worlds. The tribe kidnapped and tortured Father Estevão, Ender's stepson, by exposing him to the virus for several days without medication. This event triggered a massacre of the pequeninos by the humans of Lusitania.
- Planter: A pequenino featured prominently in Xenocide. When it was revealed to him that the descolada was manipulating pequenino behavior, he became almost suicidal, insisting that he be deprived of the descolada until death to prove that the pequenino's sentience was not caused by the descolada. Although he never entered the third life as a fathertree, he was awarded the honor of retaining his name after being planted, something which no other brothertree was given.
- Glass: Similar to Planter, Glass was the subject of a descolada deprivation test. However, Glass's experiment was the testing of Ela's new recolada virus. He successfully made the transition into the third life as fathertree.
- Fire-quencher: The pequenino representative who travels to the planet of the descoladores with Miro, Val, and the others in Children of the Mind.
- Arrow: A pequenino mentioned in Speaker for the Dead. His name shows how humans have been affected pequenino culture.

== Characters introduced in Xenocide ==
Several of the key characters in the Xenocide novel are from the planet of Path. They include:

- Han Fei-tzu is a "godspoken" man from the planet of Path, and a reluctant follower of his religion. His treaty ended a burgeoning rebellion within the Hundred Worlds some three thousand years after Ender's Xenocide. Since then he has been retained as an advisor to Starways Congress.
- Han Jiang-qing was the wife of Han Fei-tzu. She was named after an ancient revolutionary leader and was a loving godspoken follower of her religion. She died of a brittle bone disease when Qing-jao was four years old.
- Han Qing-jao is the daughter of Han Fei-tzu and Han Jiang-qing, also godspoken like her parents. When confronted with evidence that the godspoken affliction is not a sign of deitic favor but rather a genetic modification, giving her and all other godspoken both genius-level intelligence and obsessive–compulsive disorder, she is unable to cope with the truth and clings to her old traditions, spending the rest of her life doing nothing but carrying out her obsessive-compulsive ritual of tracing grains in wooden floors. Some of the phrases she mutters while doing so were later compiled into a book. Her name means "Gloriously Bright".
- Si Wang-mu is Qing-jao's "secret maid", an ambitious and extremely bright commoner whom Qing-jao takes under her wing. She met Qing-Jao after she encountered her working in the rice paddy field after bribing her guard with sex. She is named after the Queen Mother of the West, a powerful figure in Chinese mythology. When the godspoken genes are studied in hopes of retaining the genius-level intellect but removing the OCD, it is discovered that Wang-mu has naturally mutated into such a condition, and her genes are treated as a model of what the revision is intended to do. Later, she accompanies the reborn Peter Wiggin on his quest to stop the destruction of Lusitania, and eventually marries him.

== Characters from Ender in Exile ==
=== Shakespeare planet ===
- Alessandra Toscano is an Italian girl whose mother encourages her to seduce Ender. Ender rebuffs her attempts, and at the end of Ender in Exile she opts to stay on Shakespeare instead of travelling with her mother.
- Sel Menach is a xenobiologist who was involved in numerous discoveries about the ecology of Shakespeare and eventually was honored with a currency named after him. On the flight to Shakespeare, he is alerted to Quincy Morgan's plans to become governor instead of Ender.
- Vitaly Denisovitch Kolmogorov is an admiral who alerted Menach to Quincy Morgan's plans.
- Ix Tolo
- Po
- Abra is the boy who Ender was with at the end of Ender's Game, when Ender discovered the cocooned Hive Queen at the End of the World the Buggers built for him. In Ender in Exile, Abra is revealed to be a bright boy of eleven years old who can fix nearly any machine. Abra is not really accepted by the children of his age because he is seen as someone who is at the level of an adult, while the adults mostly see him as a child.
- Quincy Morgan is the captain of the ship travelling to Shakespeare. He attempts to usurp Ender as the governor of the colony, but is forced to stay aboard his ship upon landing and leaves the planet thwarted.

=== Ganges planet ===
- Randall Firth: Originally named Achilles Flanders II, Firth is the missing ninth child of Bean and Petra. Randall was born prematurely and appears to have Anton's Key turned. His mother, Nichelle Firth, also known as Randi, believes Achilles is a hero assassinated by foul enemies. Nichelle allows Achilles to implant an embryo, believing that she would be carrying Achilles' child. To avoid persecution by Peter Wiggin, Randi determines to leave Earth and live in a colony, where she can raise her child and return him to Earth later to become the new Achilles. Nichelle ends up as a part of the colony Ganges led by Virlomi. Randall, called "Achilles" by Nichelle, is raised to see Peter the Hegemon and Julian Delphiki (otherwise known as Bean) as monsters, and to believe that Achilles was a true hero. Randall was one of the first to read "The Hive Queen" and treat it like a holy book, and thus he was also the first to paint Ender in a negative light, as Ender "The Xenocide". When Ender encounters Randall on Ganges, Randall plots to provoke Ender so that Ender will strike out and kill Randall. He thinks if this can be done, the universe will realize that Ender was a dangerous criminal. However, Ender does not strike out and instead tells Randall about his true mother and father: Petra Arkanian and Julian Delphiki. Randall is so enraged by this that he proceeds to brutally beat Ender, but Ender does not retaliate at all. Just before he delivers the final blow, Randall realizes that what Ender has told him is true, and he takes Ender to a doctor immediately. Randall then decides to rename himself Arkanian Delphiki, after his true parents.
- Virlomi: see Other Battle School students

== Characters introduced in the Ender's Shadow/Bean Quartet series ==
- Anton is a scientist of European descent who discovers two genetic modifications which will allow the human brain unlimited growth, at the cost of unlimited physical growth. This discovery is named "Anton's Key" in his honor. However, research into human genetic engineering was outlawed by the international community, and when the nature of his work was discovered, he was subjected to classical conditioning to make it difficult for him to continue or even discuss his research.
- Volescu is an unethical scientist of European descent, and the brother of Bean's father. He stole Bean's parent's embryos and illegally modified all 23, "turning" Anton's Key within them; only one, Bean himself, ever grew to maturity. Volescu was later discovered and had to destroy all his "research," but Bean escaped him by, at the age of 9 months, hiding himself in the tank of a toilet. Volescu was later imprisoned for his crimes.
- Poke is an orphan girl from the streets of Rotterdam, the leader of a "crew" of fellow orphans who eventually take in Bean — and Achilles. Poke gave Bean his name, which he was originally unfond of, but later recognizes himself as Bean and ignores Colonel Graff, who tells Bean his true identity as Julian Delphiki. In Rotterdam, Bean, on some instinct, tells Poke to kill Achilles when she has the chance; she refuses, and Achilles later kills her, after kissing her, by stabbing her in the eye and then throwing her in the Rhine. Bean witnessed the kiss in the dark and, after leaving the scene, came to the realization that Poke was unsafe. He rushes back to find Poke already dead; Bean then blames himself for Poke's death. When Bean tells the story of Poke to Ender's jeesh on the journey to Eros, he decides to trust Petra, saying to her, "You cried for Poke, and that makes us friends."
- Sergeant is the second in command of Poke's crew, and later Achilles' family. He finds out Achilles killed Poke, but keeps this a secret for his, and everyone else's, protection.
- Sister Carlotta is a Catholic nun who works as a recruiter for Battle School. Like Poke, she takes in both Bean and Achilles; however, her battery of psychological tests manage to identify Achilles for who he truly is. Later, when he escapes from a mental institution in Belgium and begins his reign of terror, she and Bean go undercover to oppose him, eventually linking up with Peter Wiggin. She, like Poke, meets her death at Achilles' hands; Bean is never able to forgive himself for these deaths.
- Ullysses is a bully in Rotterdam. To help his family receive food from a soup kitchen, Achilles makes a point of beating up Ullysses. When he is released from a hospital he gloats about getting even with him. Ullysses is later killed by Achilles.
- Andrew 'Ender' Delphiki is Bean and Petra's son who travels in the relativistic spaceship with Bean and his two siblings. He is one of four children in which Anton's Key is turned. He is determined to find a cure for Anton's Key. When he and his siblings find a new world to settle in, he devises and administers a virus that will develop an organelle to shut off their growth genome, leaving their intelligence intact but saving them from the giantism half of Anton's Key.
- Rymus Ojman is the chairman of the cabinet of Starways Congress around the year 1970 S.C..
- Jakt is Valentine Wiggin's husband. He is originally from Trondheim, where he was one of the most respected lords of a fishing fleet on the planet. He chooses to depart from Trondheim with Valentine while in his sixties.
- Syfte is Jakt and Valentine's daughter. She departs her homeworld of Trondheim with her parents and newlywed husband Lars.
- Ro is Jakt and Valentine's child.
- Varsam is Jakt and Valentine's child.
- Plikt is a young student of Ender's from Trondheim. After his departure, she independently figures out that the man she knows as Andrew Wiggin is the original Speaker for the Dead as well as Ender Wiggin the Xenocide. She becomes a long-time friend and tutor of Valentine's family and departs Trondheim with them.
