= Ender =

Ender is a masculine Turkish given name, derived from the Arabic word Andar (اندر) meaning extremely rare.

It is also a family name, prevalent in families of German or Austrian origin and, as a surname, it is derived from the Middle High German word 'entar', which meant 'edge' or 'end'.

People with the name (whether as a given name or a surname) include:

== Given name ==
- Ender Alkan (born 1977), Turkish footballer
- Ender Arslan (born 1983), Turkish basketball player
- Ender Atakul (born 1989), German politician
- Ender Aygören (born 2000), Turkish footballer
- Ender Chávez (born 1981), Venezuelan baseball coach
- Ender Darling (born 1990/91), American neopagan witch
- Ender Echenique (born 2004), Venezuelan footballer
- Ender Eroğlu (born 1985), Turkish rapper, stage name Norm Ender
- Ender Günlü (born 1984), French-Turkish footballer
- Ender Inciarte (born 1990), Venezuelan baseball player
- Ender Konca (born 1947), Turkish footballer
- Ender Memet (born 1967), Romanian wrestler
- Ender Thomas (born 1977), Venezuelan singer-songwriter

== Surname ==
- Axel Ender (1853–1920), Norwegian painter and sculptor
- Boris Ender (1893–1960), Russian avant-garde painter
- Eduard Ender (1822–1883), Austrian painter, son of Johann Ender
- Elma Salinas Ender (born 1953), American attorney
- Erika Ender (born 1974), Panamanian singer, songwriter and actress
- Erwin Josef Ender (1937–2022), German prelate of Roman Catholic Church
- Hans Ender (1910–1993), German officer and Knight's Cross recipient
- Joachim Ender (born 1950), German electrical engineer
- Johann Ender (1793–1854), Austrian painter and engraver
- Kornelia Ender (born 1958), East German swimmer, multiple Olympic champion
- Maria Ender (1897–1942), Russian artist and researcher
- Maria Elisabeth Ender (1947–2006), Dutch singer
- Thomas Ender (1793–1875), Austrian painter
- Wolfgang Ender (born 1946), Olympic Alpine skier from Liechtenstein

== In fiction ==
- Ender Wiggin, character from Orson Scott Card's Ender's Game science fiction series
- The prefix ender-, a prefix in the video game Minecraft (made by Mojang Studios), which denotes mobs (characters) that are found in or related to the End (a dimension in the game) by appearing at the start of the word for the mob, like for example endermite or enderman

== Other uses ==
- "Ender", a song by A from How Ace Are Buildings
- ”Ender”, a line of 3D printers made by Creality

== See also ==
- The dictionary definition of ender at Wiktionary
- End (disambiguation)
- Enders (disambiguation)
- Endor (disambiguation)
- Enda, an Irish given name
