= Enders =

Enders or Ender's may refer to:

== Literature and film ==
- Ender's Game (series), a series of science fiction books by Orson Scott Card, also known as the Ender saga
  - Ender's Game, a 1985 military science fiction novel
  - Ender's Shadow, a 1999 parallel science fiction novel
  - A War of Gifts: An Ender Story, a 2007 science fiction novel
  - Ender in Exile, a 2008 science fiction novel
- Ender's Game (film), a 2013 American science fiction action film based on the novel

== Places ==
- Enders, Nebraska, US
- Enders, Pennsylvania, US
- Enders Island, Connecticut, US

== People ==
- Arthur Enders (born 1982), also known as "Ace" Enders, former lead singer and guitarist of the defunct band The Early November
- Courtney Enders (born 1986), drag racer
- Dieter Enders (born 1946), organic chemist who has made contributions to the field of asymmetric synthesis
- Erica Enders (born 1983), champion drag racer
- John Franklin Enders (1897–1985), Nobel laureate who helped develop the polio vaccine
- Peter Enders (chess player) (1963–2025), German chess master
- Thomas O. Enders (1932–1996), former US diplomat
- Wendelin Enders (1922–2019), German politician
- Walter Enders, a time series econometrician

== Other uses ==
- Enders (automobile), a French automobile manufactured from 1911 until 1923
- EastEnders (nickname), a British soap opera

== See also ==
- Enders's small-eared shrew, a mammal endemic to Panama
- Ender (disambiguation)
- End (disambiguation)
