= Ksenia Ender =

Russian painter (1895–1955)

Ksenia Vladimirovna Ender (1895, Slutsk - 1955, Leningrad) was a Russian avant-garde painter .

Born into a family with German roots, Ender was sister of also artists Boris Ender, Maria Ender and Yuri Ender. She studied under Mikhail Matyushin at the Free State Art Workshops (SVOMAS) in St. Petersburg from 1918 to 1922 and was a member of the Zorved group. Her works were exhibited at the "Painting Exhibition of Petrograd Artists of All Directions" in 1923 and at the 14th Venice Biennale in 1924. In the 1930s, she worked as a designer in an industrial construction office. Ender died in 1955 in Leningrad.
