= Count István Széchenyi (Friedrich von Amerling) =

Painting by Friedrich von Amerling

- Gróf Széchenyi István (Hungarian)
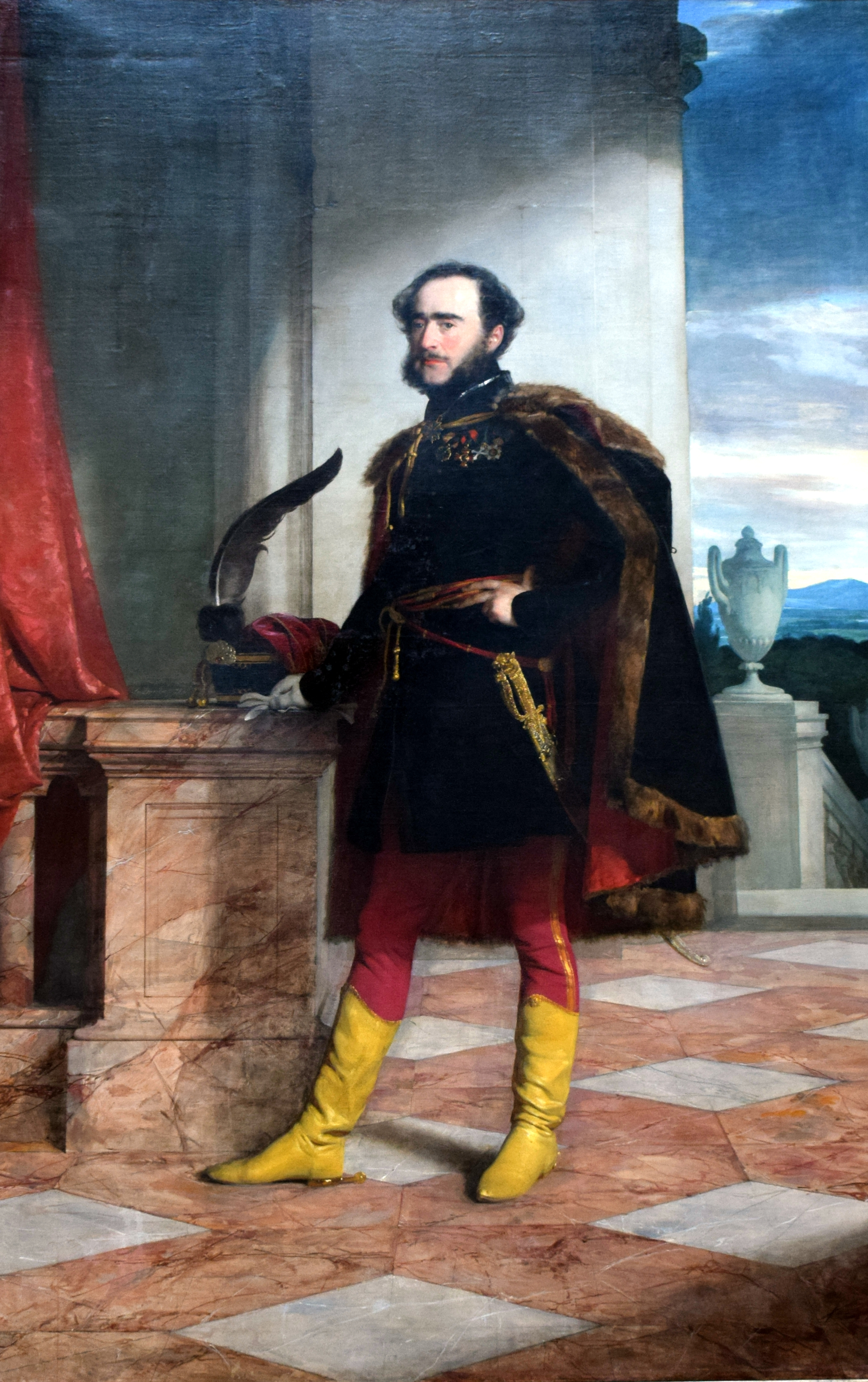
- Artist: Friedrich von Amerling
- Year: 1836
- Type: oil on canvas
- Dimensions: 280 cm × 160 cm (110 in × 63 in)
- Location: Hungarian Academy of Sciences, Budapest

The portrait of Count István Széchenyi (Hungarian: Gróf Széchenyi István) is a monumental painting by Austrian painter Friedrich von Amerling. It belongs to the Art Collection of the Hungarian Academy of Sciences in Budapest, where it portrays the founder of the institution. It has the same elaborate Rococo frame as the contemporary painting of From Darkness, the Light by Johann Ender. The painting is probably the most famous portrait of Széchenyi, the greatest statesman of the Hungarian Reform Era.

== History ==
The painting was created by Friedrich von Amerling, a Viennese artist who was the most popular portraitist of the Austrian and Hungarian aristocracy in the Biedermeier period. Count István Széchenyi donated the full annual income of his estates to establish the Hungarian Society of Learning in 1825. The scientific society came into being in 1830 and Széchenyi tried to further it during the initial period of its existence.

The painting was commissioned by the brothers of the count, Lajos and Pál Széchényi who donated it to the Academy in 1836. Their donation letter articulated the wish that "even our grandchildren, when they look at the features of this painting, let them feel the most noble emotions! let them inspire to do the most beautiful deeds for the delight of their country and nation!" Several members of the society wished to hang the painting in the general meeting room despite a rule that banned the placement of the portraits of living persons there. Eventually the rule prevailed and the painting was placed in the library.

== Description ==
The painting belongs to the type of monumental portraiture generally associated with royalty. At the time István Széchenyi was 45 years old and he reached the zenith of his career. He was a very wealthy landowner, a leading politician of the Habsburg monarchy, successful writer and reformer. Amerling placed him on the terrace of a fictional building with view to the landscape beyond. His feathered hat is on the balustrade, and he is seen holding one of his white gloves in his hand. He wears díszmagyar, the elaborate court dress of Hungarian aristocracy with a sword, medals on his chest and yellow boots.

== Sources ==
- Hungarian Academy of Sciences - information provided on the permanent exhibition
