= Boris Ender =

Russian painter, pioneer (1893–1960)

Boris Vladimirovich Ender (Russian: Борис Владимирович Эндер; February 4, 1893 – June 12, 1960) was a Russian avant-garde painter and a pioneer of biomorphic abstraction.

== Early life ==
Born in St. Petersburg, Russia, Ender came from a family with German roots. He was brother to also artists Ksenia Ender, Maria Ender, and Yuri Ender. He showed early artistic talent and studied under Ivan Yakovlevich Bilibin and later at the University of St. Petersburg. After World War I service, he studied at the Petrograd Free Art Workshops (Svomas).

== Later life ==
Ender's career flourished in the 1920s, joining Mikhail Vasilyevich Matyushin's avant-garde group "Zorved" and participating in the Workshop of Spatial Realism. He developed a unique style of biomorphic abstraction, integrating theories of light perception and brain physiology.

By the late 1920s, Ender's focus shifted towards more traditional landscape painting. His works were exhibited internationally, including at the Venice Biennale. In the 1930s, he moved to Moscow, engaging in interior and monumental art, and contributed to the design of the USSR Pavilion at the 1937 International Exposition in Paris.

Ender's legacy is preserved in Russian museums, particularly in the Tretyakov Gallery, the Russian State Archive of Literature and Art, and the MOMus–Museum of Modern Art.
