= Endora =

Endora may refer to:

== Fictional topics ==
=== Fictional people ===
- Endora (Bewitched), the magical mother-in-law portrayed by Agnes Moorehead on the TV sitcom Bewitched
- Endora Lenox, the good witch character on the television soap opera Passions
- Empress Endora, a fictional character from the videogame Ogre Battle: The March of the Black Queen

=== Fictional places ===
- Endora, a planet-sized matrioshka array in the Walter Jon Williams novel Implied Spaces
- Endora, a fictional kingdom found in the Japanese multimedia franchise Endride
- Endora, Iowa, the rural setting for two novels by Peter Hedges, What's Eating Gilbert Grape and An Ocean in Iowa

=== Other fictional elements ===
- The Endora, a fictional spaceship found in Gundam ZZ, see List of Mobile Suit Gundam ZZ characters
- Endora Corporation, a fictional company found in the 2010 videogame Alternativa

== Other uses ==
- "Like Endora," alternative rock album by Australian songwriter, Adam Cole (2000)
- Endora Playfield, Cleveland, Ohio, USA; a public park in the Cleveland Public Parks District
- Endora (ship), several ships by the name
  - Endora (wrecked 1855), a Canadian (British) steamship shipwrecked in 1855, see List of shipwrecks in August 1855
  - Endora (wrecked 1867), a British ship shipwrecked in 1867, see List of shipwrecks in November 1867

== See also ==
- Papilio endora (P. endora), a butterfly
- Endor (disambiguation)
