= From Darkness, the Light (Johann Ender) =

Painting

- Borura derü! (Hungarian)
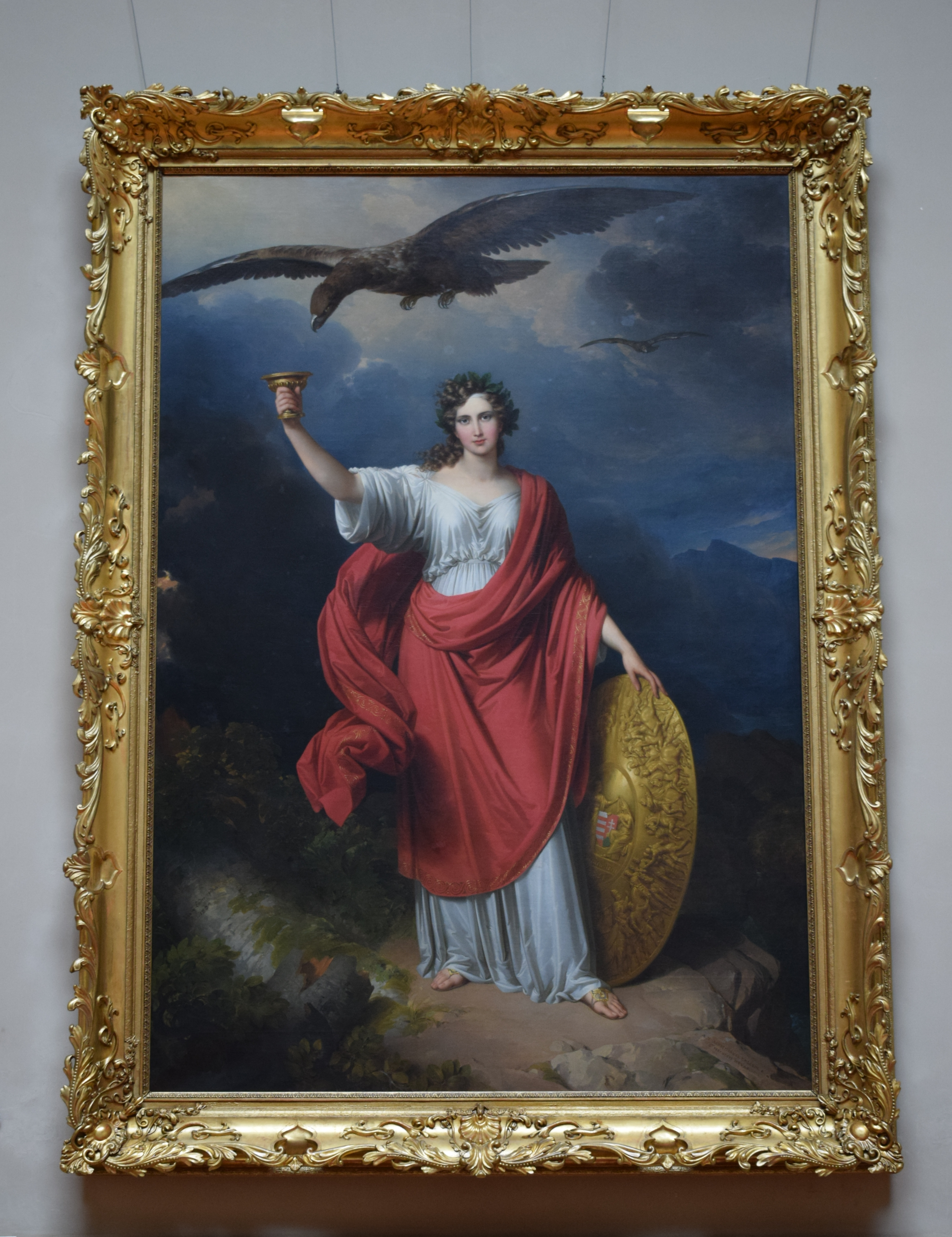
- Artist: Johann Ender
- Year: 1831
- Type: oil on canvas
- Dimensions: 273 cm × 189 cm (107 in × 74 in)
- Location: Hungarian Academy of Sciences; Budapest

From Darkness, the Light (Hungarian: Borura derü!) or Allegory of the Hungarian Academy of Sciences (Hungarian: A Magyar Tudományos Akadémia allegóriája) is a monumental painting by Johann Ender in the Art Collection of the Hungarian Academy of Sciences in Budapest. It is also the official symbol of the institution, the main motif constituting its logo.

== History ==
The painting was made by Johann Ender in 1831 and it was signed by the artist on the lower right corner: Johann Ender pinx 1831. The allegorical painting was commissioned by the founder of the academy, Count István Széchenyi who donated the full annual income of his estates to establish the Hungarian Society of Learning in 1825. The scientific society came into being in 1830. There was a strong personal connection between the client and the artist who went on long journey together in the Mediterranean in 1818. Széchenyi gave many commissions to Ender in the next decades.

Ender had to implement the visual program of Széchenyi who closely followed the preparations. The artist made several preparatory drawings. When a serious disagreement broke out, Széchenyi consulted Friedrich von Amerling, the most acclaimed painter in Vienna at the time. Amerling created an alternative draft but in the end Ender retained the assignment. The same composition was used on the coat of arms and the seal of the society.

On 4 June 1834 Széchenyi announced that he donated the "allegorical painting that constitutes the coat of arms of the society" to the institution. This is commemorated by the inscription in the lower left corner: "A' M. Accademiának emlékül G. Széchenyi István, 1834".

== Description ==
The painting shows a young goddess wearing a white chiton and a purple cloak; there is a laurel wreath on her head. In her right hand she is holding up a gold cup, her other hand is resting on a large shield. The goddess is set in a dark landscape, where heavy clouds are gathering on the sky, but the first rays of the light are bursting through the gloom. Two eagles are coming, the first one is approaching the gold cup.

The painting supposedly portrays Count Széchenyi's lover, his later wife, Crescence Seilern. At time of its creation the goddess was identified as Minerva or Amphitrite but the composition originated in the very popular subject of Goddess Hebe accompanied by the eagle of Jupiter.

In the center of the shield the Hungarian coat-of-arms is flanked by Minerva and Hungaria, the latter woman is veiled but the goddess lifts up her shroud. This is another visual reference to the enlightenment that science could bring to the country. The reliefs of the shield depict a famous episode from ancient history, the meeting of Attila, the ruler of the Huns with Pope Leo I. The inspiration for this scene was the famous painting by Raphael in the Apostolic Palace, The Meeting of Leo the Great and Attila. At the time the Huns were generally considered the forefathers of the Hungarians.

The painting has the same elaborate Rococo frame as the contemporary monumental portrait of Count István Széchenyi by Friedrich von Amerling.

== Sources ==
- Hungarian Academy of Sciences - information provided on the permanent exhibition
