= Edna =

Edna or EDNA may refer to:

== Places in the United States ==
- Edna, California, a census-designated place
- Edna, Iowa, an unincorporated town in Lyon County
  - Edna Township, Cass County, Iowa
- Edna, Kansas, a city
- Edna, Kentucky, an unincorporated community
- Edna, Texas, a city
  - Edna High School
- Edna, Washington, an unincorporated community
- Edna, West Virginia, an unincorporated community
- Edna Lake, Idaho
- Edna Township, Otter Tail County, Minnesota
- Edna Township, Barnes County, North Dakota

== Arts and entertainment ==
- Edna (album), a 2020 album by Headie One
- Edna, the Inebriate Woman, a 1971 television drama

== People ==
- Edna (given name), a list of people and characters so named

== Science and technology ==
- 445 Edna, an asteroid
- Environmental DNA (eDNA), DNA isolated from natural settings for the purpose of screening for the presence/absence of certain species
- ExtracellularDNA (eDNA)
- Ethylenedinitramine, an explosive
- Electronic Declarations for National Authorities (EDNA), a software developed by OPCW for national authorities

== See also ==
- Edna Valley AVA, American Viticultural Area in California
- Edna-Star colony, Alberta, Canada
- Enda
- Tropical Storm Edna (disambiguation)
