= Maria Ender =

Maria Vladimirovna Ender (1897, St. Petersburg - 1942, Leningrad) was a Russian artist and researcher.

Born in St. Petersburg, Russia, Ender came from a family with German roots. She was sister to also artists Ksenia Ender, Boris Ender, and Yuri Ender. She graduated from the Pedagogical Institute's Literature Studies Department in 1918 and studied painting, drawing, and music under Mikhail Matyushin. Ender attended the Petrograd State Free Art Workshops (1918-1922), focusing on "spatial realism". She worked at the State Institute of Artistic Culture (1923-1926), leading research in color-form perception. Some of her works were exhibibited in the 1923 Painting Exhibition of Petrograd Artists of All Directions, in the 1924 Venice Biennale, and in the 2017 Documenta 14.

Ender was known for her independent research in color characteristics and consulted on the painting of public buildings in Leningrad. She contributed to the Soviet Pavilion's design at the World Expositions in Paris (1937) and New York (1939). Ender died in 1942 during the siege of Leningrad and was buried in a mass grave.

Works by Maria Ender are preserved in the Costakis collection in the MOMus–Museum of Modern Art in Thessaloniki.
