= Enda =

Enda is an Irish given name. Though predominantly a male name, it can refer to a man or a woman.

It may refer to:

- Enda of Aran (died c. 530), Irish saint
- Enda Barrett (born 1987), Irish hurler
- Enda Bonner (born 1949), Irish politician
- Enda Colleran (1942–2004), Irish Gaelic football manager and player
- Enda Gormley (born 1966), Irish former Gaelic football player
- Enda Kenny (born 1951), Irish politician, Taoiseach of Ireland (2011–2017)
- Enda Kenny (singer), Irish-born Australian folk singer and songwriter
- Enda Markey (born 1976), Irish-born Australia-based theatrical producer and former singer and actor
- Enda McCormick (born 1997/8), Irish Gaelic footballer
- Enda Oates (born 1962), Irish actor
- Enda McCallion (born 1967), Irish film director
- Enda McDonagh (1930–2021), Irish priest of the Catholic Church
- Enda Rowland (born 1995), Irish hurler
- Enda Scahill, Irish banjo player
- Enda Stevens (born 1990), Irish footballer
- Enda Varley (fl. 2010-present), Irish Gaelic footballer
- Enda Walsh (born 1967), Irish playwright
- Enda Williams (born 1985), Irish Gaelic footballer
- Enda (Halloween), a character from the 1979 novelization Halloween by Curtis Richards
- Enda Harte (born 1994), Irish Writer, and Music Professional

== See also ==
- Ender (disambiguation)
- Edna (disambiguation)
- List of Irish-language given names
