= Endor =

Endor or Ein Dor may refer to:

== Places ==
- Endor (village), from the Hebrew Bible, a Canaanite village where the Witch of Endor lived
- Indur, a Palestinian village depopulated during the 1948 Arab-Israeli war
- Ein Dor, a Kibbutz in modern Israel

=== Fictional locations ===
- Endor (Star Wars), the fictional forest moon which is home to the Ewoks, or the gas giant the moon orbits, of the same name
- Middle-earth, in J. R. R. Tolkien's fictional world of Arda, known as Endor in the Quenya language
- Endor, the most successful nation in the video game Dragon Quest IV

== Other uses ==
- ENDOR, electron nuclear double resonance, a variation of electron spin resonance
- Endor, a DJ who remixed Danzel's hit "Pump It Up!" in 2019
- Endor AG, a German simulation racing peripherals manufacturer

== See also ==
- Witch of Endor
- Endora (disambiguation)
- Ender (disambiguation)
