= Thomas Ender =

Austrian painter (1793–1875)

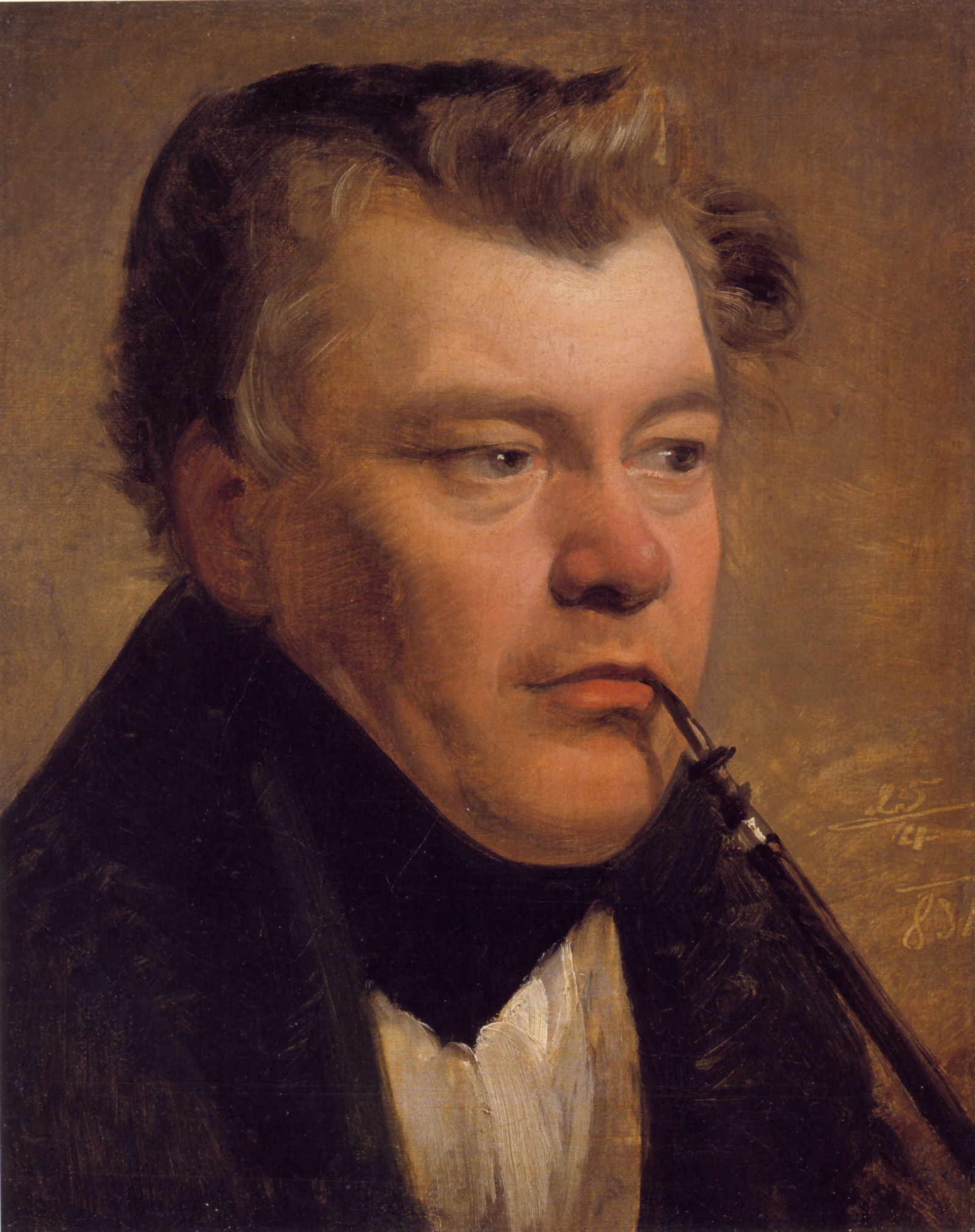
Thomas Ender; portrait by Friedrich von Amerling (1831)

Thomas Ender (3 November 1793, Vienna - 28 September 1875, Vienna) was an Austrian landscape painter and watercolorist.

== Life and work ==
He was born to Johann Ender, a junk dealer, and was the twin brother of Johann Nepomuk Ender, a history painter. He and his brother were both enrolled at the Academy of Fine Arts, Vienna, where he began by studying history painting with Hubert Maurer, but switched to landscape painting with Laurenz Janscha then, after Janscha's death in 1812, with Joseph Mössmer. He was awarded the Academy's first prize for landscape drawing.

In 1817, after several study trips, he was awarded the "Great Painter's Prize". The winning canvas was purchased by Prince Klemens von Metternich, who became Ender's patron. This made it possible for him to take part in the Austrian Brazilian Expedition, during which he made over 700 drawings and watercolors. After his return, he accompanied Metternich to Rome and remained there, on a government pension, until 1823. After that, he worked for Metternich in Salzkammergut and became a member of the Academy in 1824. Two years later, he made a study trip to Paris.

He was named a court painter to Archduke John in 1828. He accompanied him on a trip to the Middle East and Southern Russia in 1837; visiting Istanbul and Greece. Upon his return, he became a Professor at the Academy; a position he held until 1851, when he retired. His paintings grew to be very popular, and were often engraved by artists in England.

In 1845, he received an appointment as an Imperial Councilor; a largely honorary title. In 1853, he was awarded the Order of Franz Joseph. He made extended visits to Italy in 1855 and 1857.

A street in Vienna's Meidling district was named after him and his brother in 1922.

== Selected paintings ==
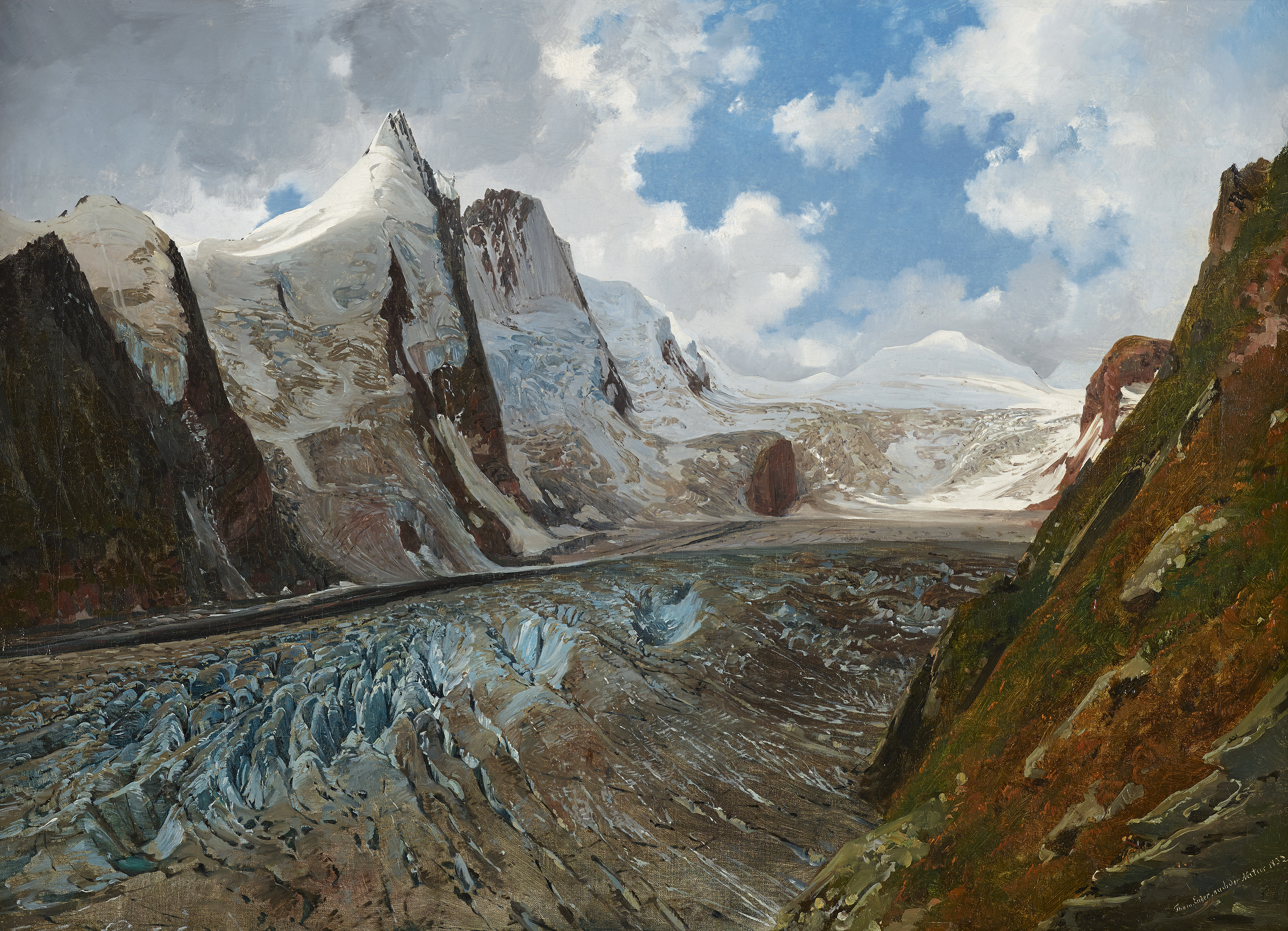
The Großglockner and the Pasterze Glacier

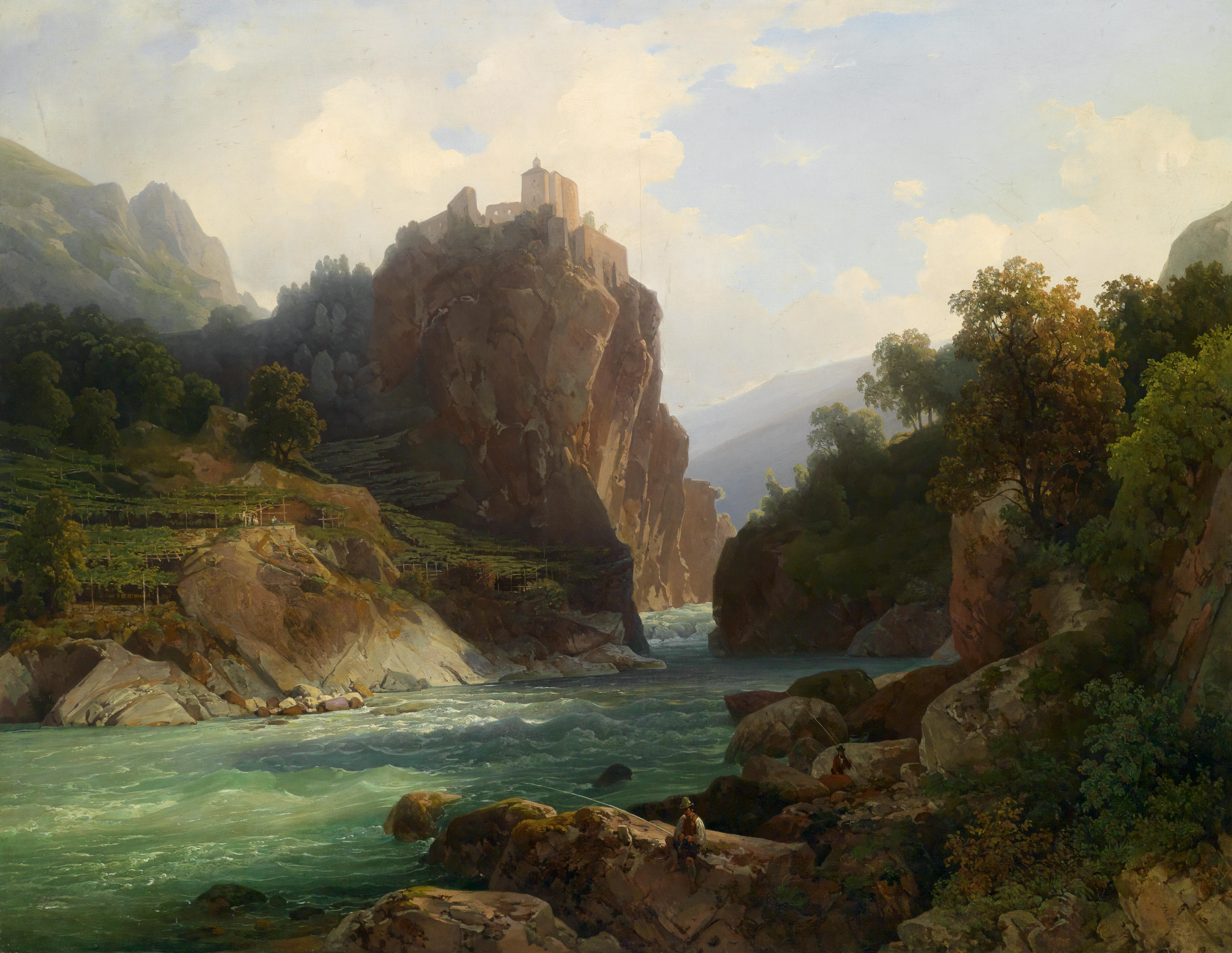
The Zenoburg, near Merano

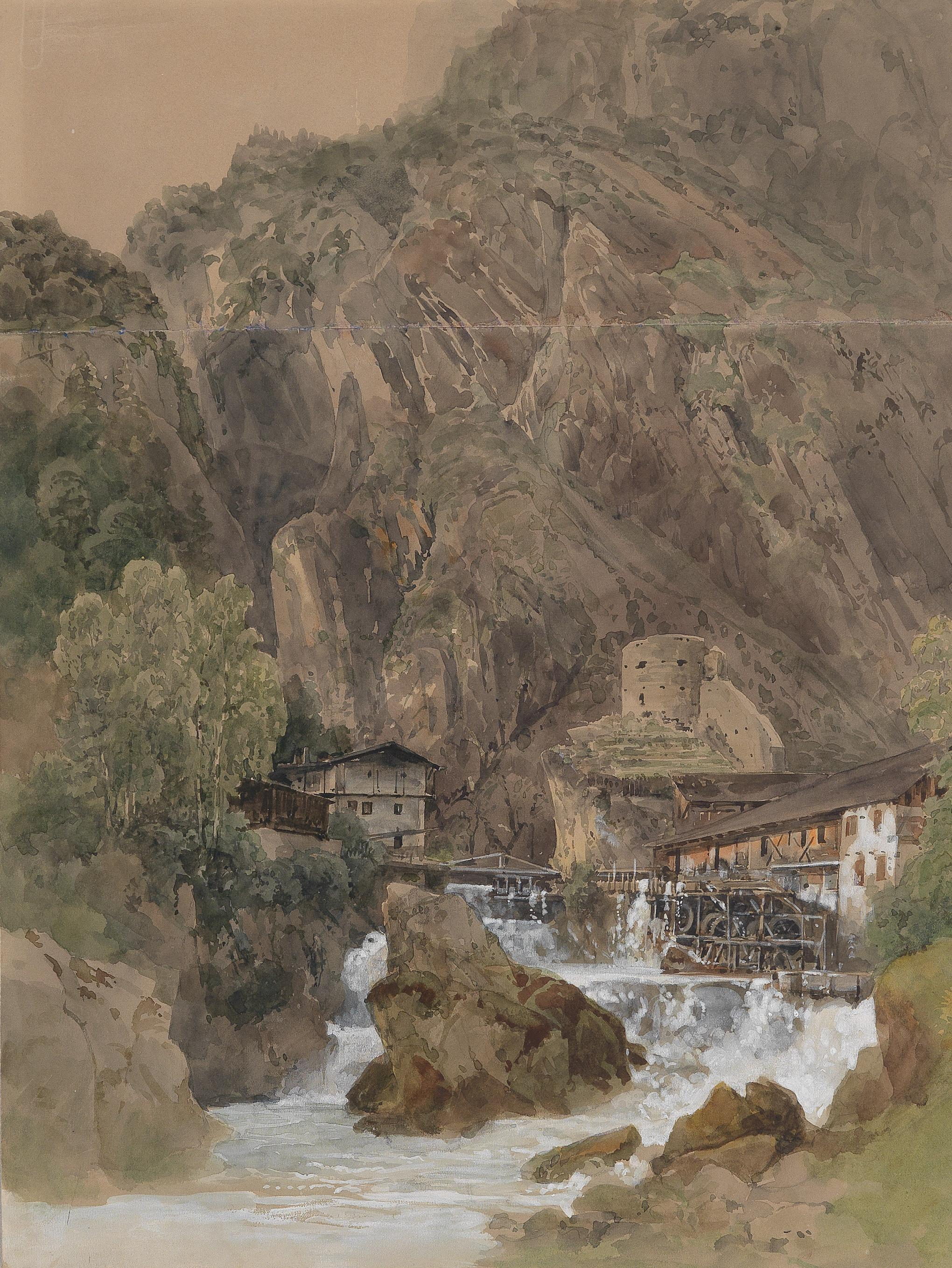
Weir System with Waterwheels

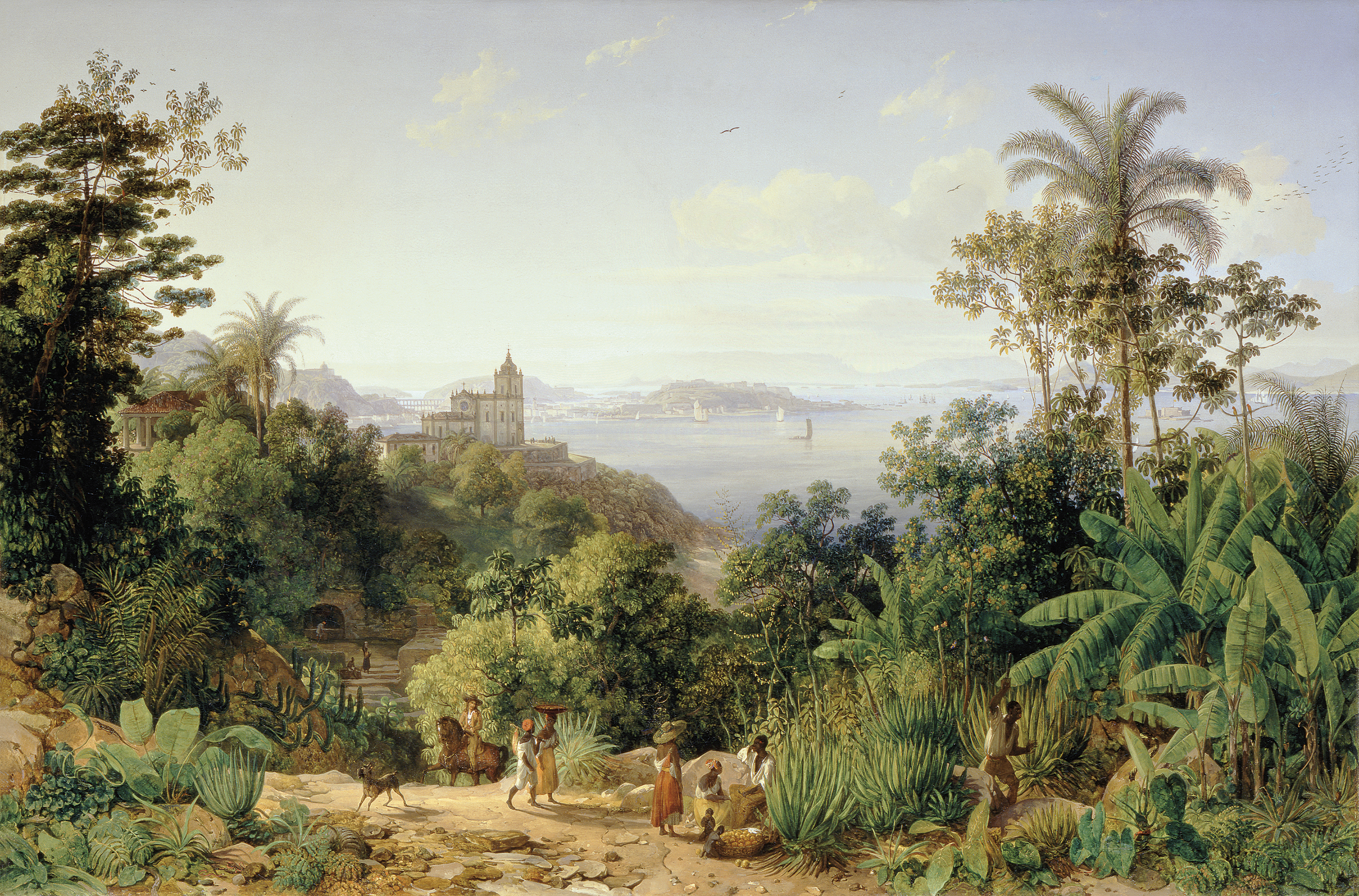
View of Rio de Janeiro

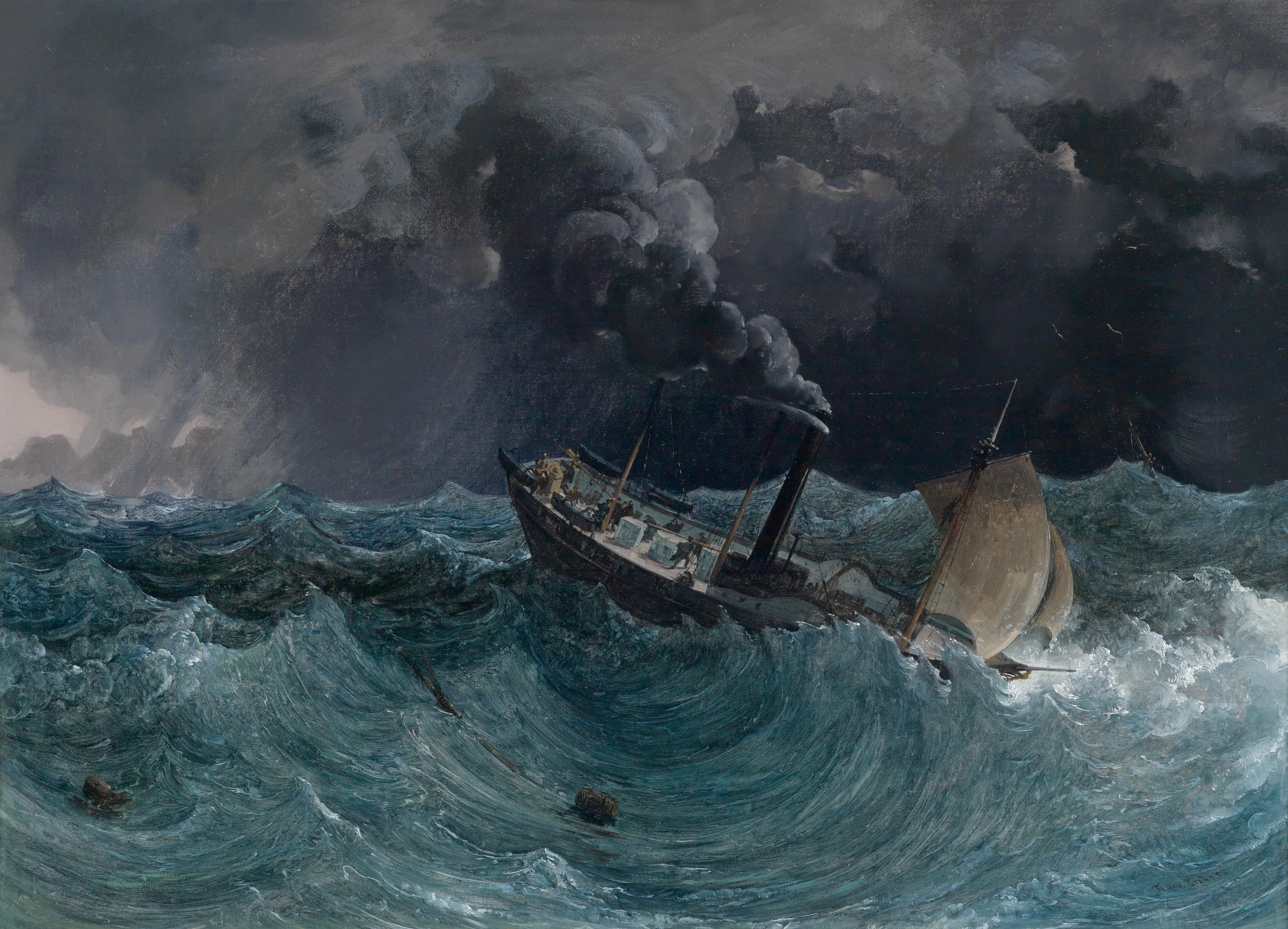
The Steamship Marianne in a Storm on the Black Sea

== Sources ==
- Constantin von Wurzbach: "Ender, Thomas." In: Biographisches Lexikon des Kaiserthums Oesterreich (Biographical Lexicon of the Empire of Austria). Part 4 Verlag der typogr.-literar.-artist. Anstalt (L. C. Zamarski, C. Dittmarsch & Comp.), Vienna 1858, p. 41–43 (digitalised).
- Kábdebo (1877). "Ender, Thomas" . Allgemeine Deutsche Biographie (in German). Vol. 6. Leipzig: Duncker & Humblot. pp. 106–107.
- "Ender Thomas". In: Österreichisches Biographisches Lexikon 1815–1950 (ÖBL). Vol. 1, Austrian Academy of Sciences, Vienna 1957, p. 247.
- Albertina (Vienna), „Von der Schönheit der Natur“ Die Kammermaler Erzherzog Johanns, Exhibition catalog, Klaus Albrecht Schröder and Maria Luise Sternath (Eds.), "Thomas Ender", by Stefanie Hoffmann-Gudehus, pp. 150–214, 2015; Hirmer Verlag GmbH München, ISBN 978-3-7774-2393-7
