= Joachim Ender =

German electrical engineer

Joachim Ender (birth 1950, Soest, Germany) is an electrical engineer with the Fraunhofer Group in Wachtberg, Germany. He was named a Fellow of the Institute of Electrical and Electronics Engineers (IEEE) in 2014 for his contributions to multi-channel synthetic aperture radar and radar array signal processing. Ender also received from EURASIP the Group Technical Achievement Award for the same work.

After receiving his diploma in mathematics and physics at Westfalian Wilhems University, Ender began his career as a radar scientist in 1976. He was director of the Fraunhofer Institute for High Frequency Physics and Radar Technology, as well as chairman for High Frequency Sensors and Radar Techniques at the University of Siegen Center for Sensor Systems, until July 2016. In his retirement, Ender is still active as senior scientist at the FHR and as senior member and professor at the Center for Sensor Systems (ZESS) at the University of Siegen.

Ender was one of the founding members of the European Conference on Synthetic Aperture Radar (EUSAR), which takes place every two years. He created, together with colleagues, the International Workshop on Compressive Sensing Applied to Radar" (CoSeRa), which first convened in April 2012. In 2009, Ender further founded the International Summer School on Radar and SAR, which gathers each July.
