= Eduard Ender =

Austrian painter (1822–1883)

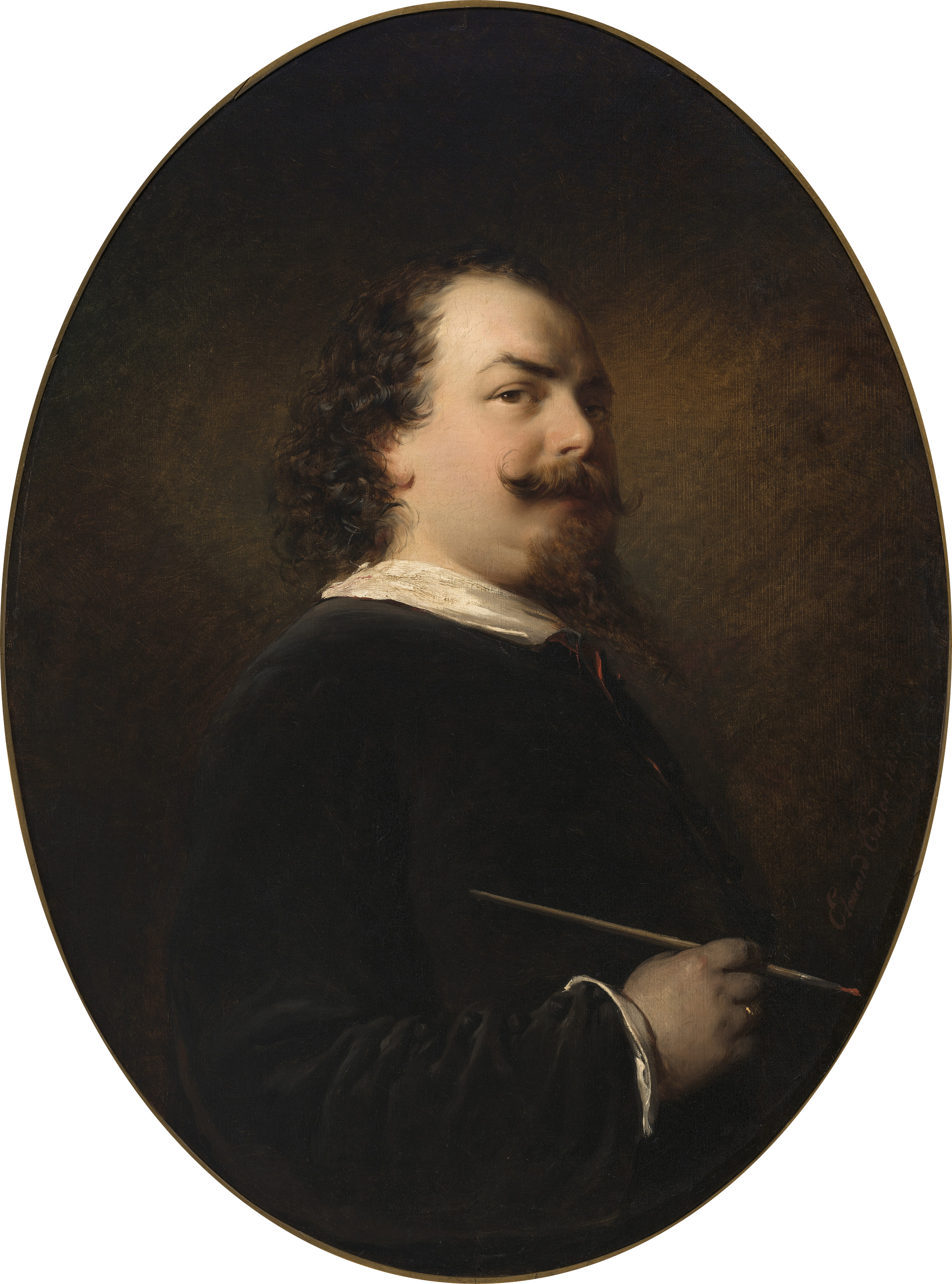
Ender's self-portrait (1853)

Eduard Ender (3 March 1822, Rome – 28 December 1883, London) was an Austrian painter.

Ender was the son of Johann Ender. He is noted for historical and genre works, among which are Francis I in the Studio of Cellini; Shakespeare Reading “Macbeth” before the Court of Elizabeth; La Corbeille de Mariage; and A Game of Chess, as well as a painting of the famous German scientist Alexander von Humboldt and his scientist travelling companion Aimé Bonpland. Humboldt did not like the painting, since the scientific instruments included in it were not accurately depicted.
