= Ender Atakul =

German politician (born 1989)

Member of the Berlin House of Representatives
- Incumbent
- Assumed office 29 October 2026
- Constituency: Spandau

Personal details
- Born: 1989 (age 36–37)
- Party: Die Linke

Ender Atakul (born 1989) is a German politician who was elected member of the Berlin House of Representatives in 2026. He has been a board member of Die Linke in Spandau since 2025.
