= List of shipwrecks in August 1855 =

The list of shipwrecks in August 1855 includes ships sunk, wrecked, grounded, or otherwise lost during August 1855.

== 1 August ==
List of shipwrecks: 1 August 1855
Ship	State	Description
Mulheide	Denmark	The schooner was wrecked in the Yangtze.
Oriental	United Kingdom	The barque ran aground on the Da Silva Sands, off the coast of Burma. She was on a voyage from Rangoon to London.

== 2 August ==
List of shipwrecks: 2 August 1855
Ship	State	Description
Cavalier	(United Kingdom of Great Britain and Ireland) British North America	The ship was driven ashore on Grand Manan, Nova Scotia. She was on a voyage from Saint John, New Brunswick to London. She was refloated on 10 August.
Shamrock	United Kingdom	The steamship ran aground in the Sound of Sunda. She was on a voyage from Glasgow, Renfrewshire to Sligo. She was refloated on 18 September and towed into Campbeltown, Argyllshire.

== 3 August ==
List of shipwrecks: 3 August 1855
Ship	State	Description
Indefatigable	Chile	The transport ship exploded and sank with the loss of three of her crew and a fourth reported missing.
Naomi	United Kingdom	The ship struck rocks off Falconera Island, Greece and sank. Her crew were rescued by Eliza Bower (United Kingdom). Naomi was on a voyage from Liverpool, Lancashire to Constantinople, Ottoman Empire.
Retriever	United Kingdom	The barque capsized and sank in the River Mersey off Tranmere, Cheshire with the loss of two of her fourteen crew. She was refloated on 18 August and was beached.
Undine	United Kingdom	The schooner ran aground on the Gunfleet Sand, in the North Sea off the coast of Essex. She was refloated but consequently sank off Harwich, Essex. She was on a voyage from Middlesbrough, Yorkshire to Dunkirk, Nord, France.

== 4 August ==
List of shipwrecks: 4 August 1855
Ship	State	Description
Endora	(United Kingdom of Great Britain and Ireland) British North America	The steamship was wrecked at Constitución, Chile.
Helen	United Kingdom	The ship was driven ashore and damaged in Culzean Bay. She was on a voyage from Belfast, County Antrim to Ayr. She was refloated on 13 August and towed into Ayr.
Jane	United Kingdom	The barque ran aground and wrecked on Lighthouse Island, off Syros, Greece. She was on a voyage from Constantinople, Ottoman Empire to Syros.
Œa	United Kingdom	The schooner was run into by Thisbe (French Navy) and sank in the Atlantic Ocean off the coast of Uruguay.
Rayo	Chile	The steamship was driven ashore and wrecked at Constitución.

== 6 August ==
List of shipwrecks: 6 August 1855
Ship	State	Description
Juanita	Brazil	The ship was driven ashore on the Barbary Coast. She was on a voyage from Bahia to Trieste. She was refloated and put into Gibraltar in a leaky condition.
Rob Roy	United Kingdom	The ship was driven ashore in Mollens Bay. She was on a voyage from Liverpool, Lancashire to Saint John, New Brunswick, British North America. She was refloated on 12 August and taken into Belfast, County Antrim.

== 7 August ==
List of shipwrecks: 7 August 1855
Ship	State	Description
Isabelle	France	The steamship struck rocks and Cabo Candor, Spain and sank. All on board were rescued. She was on a voyage from Havre de Grâce, Seine-Inférieure to Cádiz, Spain.

== 8 August ==
List of shipwrecks: 8 August 1855
Ship	State	Description
Lady Bannerman	United Kingdom	The ship was in collision with the gunboat Sainte Barbe (French Navy) and sank. Her crew were rescued by the gunboat. She was on a voyage from Newcastle upon Tyne, Northumberland to Plymouth, Devon.
Rossiya	Imperial Russian Navy	Crimean War, Bombardment of Sveaborg: The Fershampenuaz-class ship of the line was sunk at Sveaborg during an attack by French Navy and Royal Navy ships.

== 9 August ==
List of shipwrecks: 9 August 1855
Ship	State	Description
Carleton	United Kingdom	The full-rigged ship was wrecked off "Carysfoot", Falkland Islands. Her crew were rescued. She was on a voyage from Swansea, Glamorgan to Caldera, Chile.
Cottingham	United Kingdom	The steamship ran aground on Gotland, Sweden. All on board, her crew and 133 passengers, were rescued. She was declared a total loss, but was salvaged in 1856 and rebuilt as the Swedish ship Prins Oscar.
Mackintosh	United Kingdom	The ship ran aground at Newburgh, Fife. She was on a voyage from Newburgh to the Firth of Forth.
Sir Colin Campbell	United Kingdom	The barque capsized at South Shields, County Durham. She was righted.

== 10 August ==
List of shipwrecks: 10 August 1855
Ship	State	Description
Unicorn	United Kingdom	The steamship ran aground at Hong Kong.

== 11 August ==
List of shipwrecks: 11 August 1855
Ship	State	Description
Clown	United Kingdom	The ship sprang a leak and foundered in the South China Sea. Her crew were rescued by Paonshun ( China).
Dorothy and Mary	United Kingdom	The schooner ran aground at Flensburg, Duchy of Holstein. She was refloated on 13 August and resumed her voyage.
Fidentia	United Kingdom	The ship was wrecked on the Bird Island Reef. She was on a voyage from Newport, Monmouthshire to St. Thomas, Virgin Islands.
Henry	United Kingdom	The brigantine was run into by the steamship Vivid (United Kingdom) and sank off Dover, Kent with the loss of one of her four crew. She was on a voyage from South Shields, County Durham to Rouen, Seine-Inférieure, France. Henry subsequently floated, and came ashore at South Foreland, Kent on 30 September.

== 12 August ==
List of shipwrecks: 12 August 1855
Ship	State	Description
Loire	France	The steamship ran aground and was wrecked on the north point of Lundy Island, Devon, United Kingdom. She was on a voyage from Cardiff, Glamorgan, United Kingdom to Bordeaux, Gironde.
Result	United Kingdom	The ship ran aground on the Goodwin Sands, Kent. She was on a voyage from London to a Mediterranean port. She was refloated with assistance from the tug Charm (United Kingdom) and resumed her voyage.

== 13 August ==
List of shipwrecks: 13 August 1855
Ship	State	Description
Gentleman	United Kingdom	The brig ran aground on the Swineboden, in the Baltic Sea. She was on a voyage from Hull, Yorkshire to Memel, Prussia. She was refloated the next day and taken into Helsingør, Denmark in a leaky condition.

== 14 August ==
List of shipwrecks: 14 August 1855
Ship	State	Description
Christiane Charlotte	Sweden	The ship ran aground at Sønderho, Denmark and was damaged. She was on a voyage from Helsingborg to London, United Kingdom.
Genius	Hamburg	The galeas ran aground at Sønderho. She was on a voyage from Newcastle upon Tyne, Northumberland, United Kingdom to the Agger Canal, Denmark.
Hudson	United Kingdom	The brig was driven ashore at McMullen's Point, Nova Scotia, British North America. She was on a voyage from Tatamagouche, Nova Scotia to Liverpool, Lancashire. She was refloated the next day and resumed her voyage.
Wellington	United Kingdom	The Mersey Flat foundered off the Calf of Man, Isle of Man. Her crew survived. She was on a voyage from Peel, Isle of Man to Chester, Cheshire.
HMS Wolverine	Royal Navy	The Racer-class brig-sloop was wrecked on the Mosquito Coast in a hurricane. Her crew were rescued.

== 15 August ==
List of shipwrecks: 15 August 1855
Ship	State	Description
Emily Maria	United Kingdom	The Mersey Flat ran aground on the anchor of John (United Kingdom and sank at Dublin.
Science	United Kingdom	The brig foundered.

== 16 August ==
List of shipwrecks: 16 August 1855
Ship	State	Description
Elizabeth Grimmer	United Kingdom	The barque was wrecked on the Jardanillos, off the coast of Cuba. All on board survived. She was on a voyage from Jamaica to Liverpool, Lancashire.
Meteor	United Kingdom	The brig was driven ashore at Klitmøller, Denmark. She was on a voyage from Newcastle upon Tyne, Northumberland to Swinemünde, Prussia.

== 17 August ==
List of shipwrecks: 17 August 1855
Ship	State	Description
John Beynon	United Kingdom	The brig was run down by the steamship Imperatriz (United Kingdom and sank in the Sea of Marmora. She was on a voyage from Constantinople, Ottoman Empire to Syra, Greece.

== 18 August ==
List of shipwrecks: 18 August 1855
Ship	State	Description
Burlington	United Kingdom	The steamship ran aground at Cuxhaven. She was on a voyage from Hamburg to Hull, Yorkshire. She was refloated on 20 August with assistance from Superb (United Kingdom) and towed into Cuxhaven in a severely leaky condition.
Conquest	United Kingdom	The ship ran aground at Teignmouth, Devon. She was on a voyage from Exmouth to Teignmouth. She was refloated and found to be leaky.
Tory	United Kingdom	The ship was wrecked on the coast of Brazil. She was on a voyage from Cardiff, Glamorgan to Maranhão, Brazil.

== 19 August ==
List of shipwrecks: 19 August 1855
Ship	State	Description
Ann and Susannah	United Kingdom	The sloop struck The Skerries, Anglesey and sank. Her four crew were rescued by the Anglesey Lifeboat. She was on a voyage from Bangor, Caernarfonshire to Dundalk, County Louth.
Fenix	Spain	The brig was in collision with the troopship Mobile (United Kingdom) in the North Sea off the Brake Sand and was abandoned by her crew, who were rescued by Mobile. One crewman was reported missing. Fenix was on a voyage from London to Cardiff, United Kingdom. Fenix was subsequently taken into Ramsgate, Kent, United Kingdom.

== 20 August ==
List of shipwrecks: 20 August 1855
Ship	State	Description
Tugend	Rostock	The ship was wrecked at Sodra Naseby, Öland, Sweden.
Wemelina	Hamburg	The ship ran aground in the Wester Till and was wrecked. Her crew were rescued. She was on a voyage from Liverpool, Lancashire, United Kingdom to Hamburg.

== 21 August ==
List of shipwrecks: 21 August 1855
Ship	State	Description
Luck's All	United Kingdom	The ship foundered in the North Sea off the coast of Northumberland. Her crew were rescued by a steamboat.
Saggitare	France	The ship caught fire whilst on a voyage from Gijón to Adra, Spain. She put into Gibraltar, where she was scuttled.

== 22 August ==
List of shipwrecks: 22 August 1855
Ship	State	Description
Alma	United Kingdom	The ship capsized in the Hooghly River. She was on a voyage from Madras to Calcutta, India.
John Bright	United Kingdom	The ship ran aground on the Jack's Hole Bank, in the Irish Sea off the coast of County Dublin. She was on a voyage from Liverpool, Lancashire to New York, United States. She was refloated the next day and put back to Liverpool in a leaky condition.

== 23 August ==
List of shipwrecks: 23 August 1855
Ship	State	Description
Lady Jocelyn	United Kingdom	The steamship ran aground off Leander's Tower, Scutari, Ottoman Empire.

== 24 August ==
List of shipwrecks: 24 August 1855
Ship	State	Description
Content	France	The barque was wrecked on the south coast of Saint Croix, Virgin Islands in a hurricane.
Juliana	India	The ship was wrecked at Calicut.
Maid of Mostyn	United Kingdom	The ship was in collision with Ariadne (United Kingdom) and sank in the River Mersey. Her crew were rescued. She was on a voyage from Poole, Dorset to Liverpool, Lancashire.
Prince Albert	United Kingdom	The ship was wrecked on the Whale Rock, off Cannonier's Point, Mauritius. All on board, almost 400 people, were rescued. She was on a voyage from Calcutta, India to Mauritius and London.

== 25 August ==
List of shipwrecks: 25 August 1855
Ship	State	Description
Carl	United Kingdom	The ship was driven ashore at Liverpool, Lancashire. She was on a voyage from Liverpool to Saint Thomas, Virgin Islands.
Koh-i-Noor	(United Kingdom of Great Britain and Ireland) Barbados	The schooner was driven ashore and damaged in a hurricane at Barbados. She was refloated on 11 September.
New City of Cork	United Kingdom	The brig was driven ashore and wrecked in a hurricane at Barbados. Two of her crew were lost.
William Large	United Kingdom	The barque was driven ashore and wrecked in a hurricane at Barbados. She was refloated on 11 September.

== 26 August ==
List of shipwrecks: 26 August 1855
Ship	State	Description
A. V. Knickerbocker	United States	Bound from Sandy Bay, Michigan, with a crew of five and a cargo of bark, the 66-foot-8-inch (20.32 m) two-masted schooner capsized on Lake Michigan 10 nautical miles (19 km; 12 mi) off the coast of Wisconsin 6 miles (9.7 km) north of Port Washington during a gale. After her crew cut away her foremast, she partially righted herself and drifted ashore 6 miles (9.7 km) north of Port Washington, probably in the vicinity of 43°27.613′N 087°48.164′W. Her captain drowned trying to swim to shore, but the rest of her crew reached shore safely. Her wreck reportedly remained visible on the beach until 1920, but subsequently disappeared, probably buried in sand. Its exact location has been forgotten.
Brothers	United Kingdom	The schooner struck the quayside at Dundee, Forfarshire and was holed by her anchor. She then caught fire and sank due to her cargo of quicklime getting wet. She was on a voyage from Sunderland, County Durham to Dundee.
Charles	United Kingdom	The schooner was in collision with the schooner Snowdrop (United Kingdom) and foundered in the North Sea off Whitby, Yorkshire with the loss of four of her crew.
Content	France	The brig was lost off Saint Croix, Virgin Islands in a hurricane with the loss of all hands. She was on a voyage from Martinique to Marseille, Bouches-du-Rhône.
Ellen Campion	United Kingdom	The ship was driven ashore and wrecked at Georgetown, Prince Edward Island, British North America. She was on a voyage from Prince Edward Island to a British port.
Herald	United Kingdom	The schooner was lost in Esquimaux Bay. She was on a voyage from Newburyport, Massachusetts to Labrador, British North America.
Regulus	United Kingdom	The barque was wrecked on The Skerries, Anglesey. Her eighteen crew were rescued by the Cemlyn Lifeboat. She was on a voyage from Liverpool, Lancashire to Maranhão, Brazil.

== 27 August ==
List of shipwrecks: 27 August 1855
Ship	State	Description
Ebenezer	United Kingdom	The ship was driven ashore in Baglan Bay. She was on a voyage from Bristol, Gloucestershire to Port Talbot, Glamorgan. She was refloated on 31 August and taken into Port Talbot.
Herald	United States	The schooner was wrecked at Bonne-Espérance Province of Canada, British North America. Her crew were rescued. She was on a voyage from Newburyport, Massachusetts to Labrador, British North America.
Regulus	United Kingdom	The ship ran aground on The Skerries, off Anglesey. Her crew survived.
HMS Vulture	Royal Navy	The frigate ran aground off Hanko Head, Grand Duchy of Finland and was damaged.

== 28 August ==
List of shipwrecks: 28 August 1855
Ship	State	Description
Planter	(United Kingdom of Great Britain and Ireland) Antigua	The drogher was driven ashore in a squall at Antigua. She was refloated the next day.
Undine	(United Kingdom of Great Britain and Ireland) Antigua	The sloop capsized and sank in a squall at Antigua.

== 29 August ==
List of shipwrecks: 29 August 1855
Ship	State	Description
Artistic	United Kingdom	The ship departed from Swansea, Glamorgan for Huasco, Chile. No further trace, presumed foundered with the loss of all hands.
Jacob Prentiss	United Kingdom	The ship was wrecked off Skagen, Denmark. She was on a voyage from Memel, Prussia to Bristol, Gloucestershire.

== 31 August ==
List of shipwrecks: 31 August 1855
Ship	State	Description
Jacob Unger	Duchy of Holstein	The ship was severely damaged by an explosion in her cargo of coal at Cardiff, Glamorgan, United Kingdom. She was on a voyage from Cardiff to Flensburg.
Rainbow	United Kingdom	The barque was wrecked off Key Vaccas. Her crew were rescued. She was on a voyage from Swansea, Glamorgan to Havana, Cuba.
Rising Sun	Norway	The ship ran aground in the Rio Grande and was wrecked.
William Hendry	United Kingdom	The schooner ran aground in the River Foyle. She was on a voyage from Londonderry to Ardrossan, Ayrshire.

== Unknown date ==
List of shipwrecks: Unknown date in August 1855
Ship	State	Description
Aberfoyle	United Kingdom	The ship caught fire at Calcutta, India and was scuttled.
Balaklava	United Kingdom	The brig was wrecked on Gordon's Reef, off Deep Cove, Nova Scotia before 18 August.
Ballarat	(United Kingdom of Great Britain and Ireland) Victoria	The steamship ran aground on the Seventeen Mile Reef before 4 August. She was refloated and put into Ipswich, New South Wales, where she sank. She was later refloated and taken into Brisbane, New South Wales for repairs.
Broderene	Flag unknown	The ship was abandoned in the Atlantic Ocean off Ouessant, Finistère, France before 14 August. She was taken into the Isles of Scilly, United Kingdom by HMS Nautilus (Royal Navy) on 18 August.
Canada	United Kingdom	The ship was lost in La Poile Bay before 6 August. Her crew survived. She was on a voyage from Newcastle upon Tyne, Northumberland to Quebec City, Province of Canada, British North America.
Caro	United Kingdom	The barque was wrecked at Constitución before 14 August.
Charlotte	United Kingdom	The ship was wrecked at False Point, India. She was on a voyage from Bombay to Calcutta.
Childe Harold	United Kingdom	The full-rigged ship was driven ashore and wrecked on the Barbary Coast before 14 August. Her seventeen crew were rescued.
Ellen	United Kingdom	The brigantine was driven ashore at White Point, Cape North, Nova Scotia, British North America. She was on a voyage from Prince Edward Island, British North America to Belfast, County Antrim. She was refloated and taken into Sydney, Nova Scotia.
Endora	United States	The steamship was wrecked at Constitución before 14 August.
Flora McIvor	United Kingdom	The barque was wrecked at Constitución before 14 August.
General List	United Kingdom	The ship sprang a leak in the Indian Ocean before 8 August. She was taken in tow by HCS Zenobia ( Royal Indian Navy) and beached at Saugor, India. General List was on a voyage from Calcutta, India to London.
Glencairn	United Kingdom	The ship ran aground in the Magdalena River. She was on a voyage from Liverpool, Lancashire to Quebec City, Province of Canada, British North America. She was refloated and put into Montreal, Province of Canada.
Horsburg	United Kingdom	The ship was wrecked at Valparaíso, Chile.
Jessie	United Kingdom	The ship foundered in the North Sea off Heligoland. Her crew were rescued by Carl (United Kingdom).
John Hamilton	United Kingdom	The ship was abandoned in the Indian Ocean before 16 August. She was on a voyage from Bombay to the Clyde.
Kestrel	United Kingdom	The ship struck a sunken rock off Canna, Inner Hebrides and foundered. She was on a voyage from Liverpool to Memel, Prussia.
Leonor	Chile	The brig was wrecked at Constitución before 14 August.
Pepita	Spain	The barque ran aground on the Placa de los Roques, off the Bahamas Banks and was damaged. She was on a voyage from Havana, Cuba to Falmouth, Cornwall, United Kingdom. She was refloated and put into Matanzas, Cuba, where she arrived on 14 August.
Queen Victoria	United Kingdom	The brig was abandoned in the North Sea. Her crew were rescued by the steamship Bergen (Norway).
Raya	Chile	The steamship was wrecked at Constitución before 14 August.
Robert Barbour	United Kingdom	The ship was wrecked in the New Bedford Channel before 8 August. She was on a voyage from Liverpool to Calcutta.
Robert Robinson	(United Kingdom of Great Britain and Ireland) British North America	The schooner was abandoned in the Atlantic Ocean before 1 August.
William Cole	United Kingdom	The full-rigged ship was wrecked in San Antonio Bay. She was on a voyage from Valparaíso to Caldera, Chile.
