= Enders's small-eared shrew =

Conservation status
- Endangered (IUCN 3.1)

Scientific classification
- Kingdom: Animalia
- Phylum: Chordata
- Class: Mammalia
- Order: Eulipotyphla
- Family: Soricidae
- Genus: Cryptotis
- Species: C. endersi

Binomial name
- Cryptotis endersi Setzer, 1950
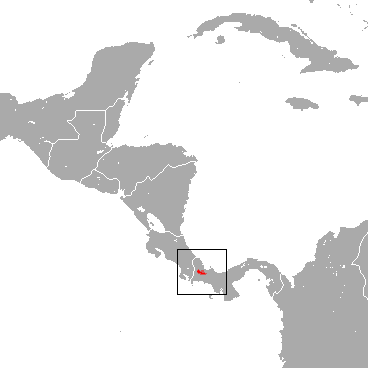
- Enders's small-eared shrew range

Species of mammal

Enders's small-eared shrew (Cryptotis endersi) is a species of mammal in the family Soricidae. It is endemic to Panama. This species is larger than the other species in the Cryptotis genus and has a tail that is about 49-60% of their head and body length. There have only been two specimens found in 1950 and 1980 which interests scientists but also concerns them about conservation.
