= Enders (automobile) =

Small vintage brass cyclecar automobile

The Enders was a French automobile manufactured from 1911 until 1923. A small cyclecar designed by an M. Violet, it ran on a two-stroke 500 cc engine.
