= Johann Ender =

Austrian painter and engraver (1793–1854)

Johann Nepomuk Ender
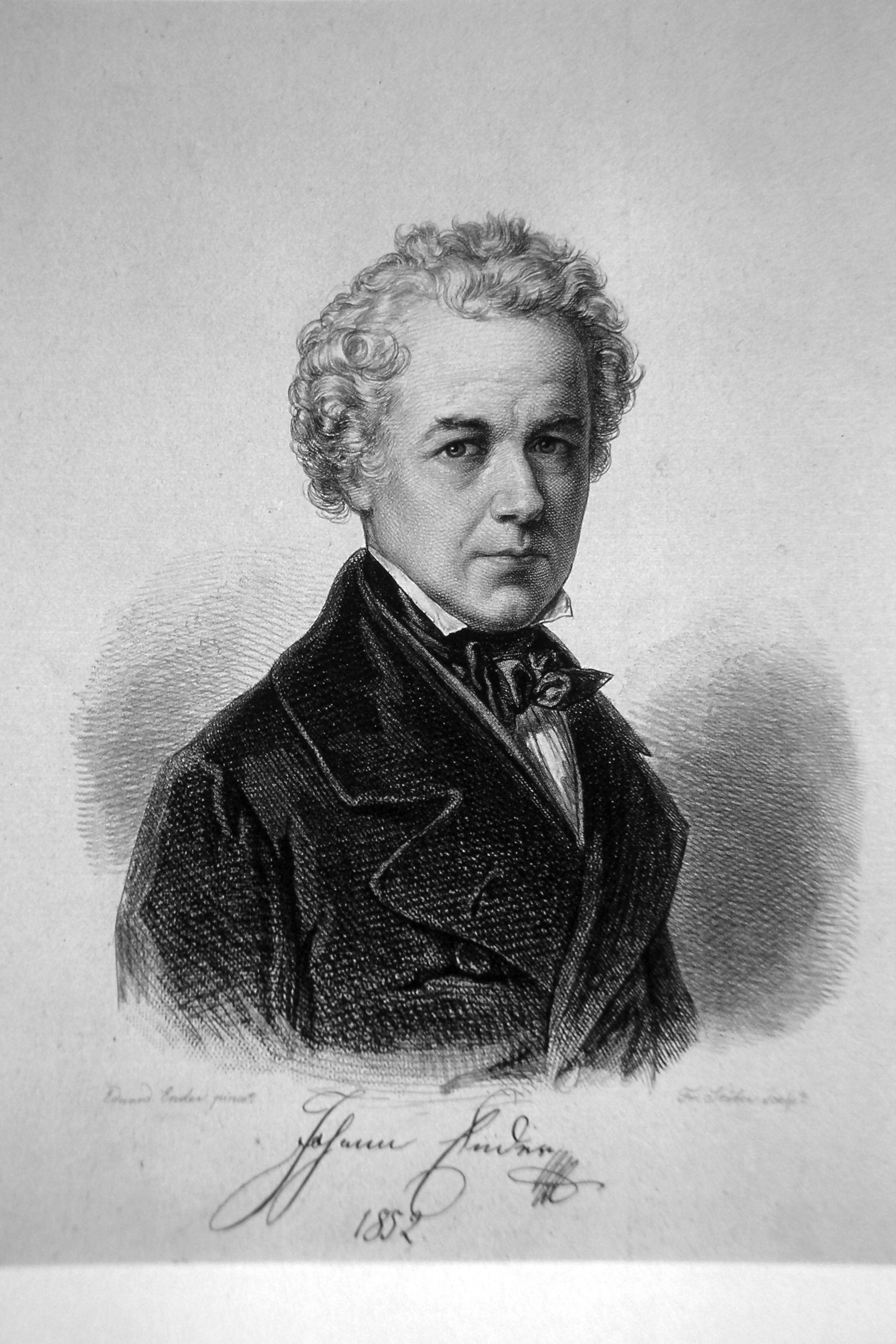
- Etching by Franz Xaver Stöber (1852)
- Born: 3 November 1793; Vienna, Austrian Empire
- Died: 16 March 1854 (aged 60); Vienna, Austrian Empire
- Occupations: Portrait painter; engraver

Johann Nepomuk Ender (3 November 1793 – 16 March 1854) was an Austrian portrait painter and engraver.

== Biography ==
He spent several years studying at the Academy of Fine Arts, Vienna, where he had his debut with his canvas depicting the death of Marcus Aurelius. which won an award. Although he developed his own style, his works show the obvious influence of his contemporary, Jean-Baptiste Isabey.

In 1818, Count István Széchenyi invited Ender to accompany him on a trip to Greece and Italy. Ender accepted, and brought back a large number of sketches that he turned into oil paintings. During the trip, he also made contacts which later enabled him to stay at the Accademia di San Luca in Rome.

After returning, in 1826, he settled in Vienna and worked as a freelance artist. From 1829 to 1850, he was a teacher at the Academy. He created numerous copper engravings and religious art, but earned most of his living by painting portraits. One of his most highly considered works is a Crucifixion scene, commissioned for the Pribce Eugen Chapel at St. Stephen's Cathedral. He worked on it from 1850 to 1852.

His twin brother, Thomas, and son Eduard were also painters. In 1922, a street in Vienna's Meidling district was named for them.

== Works ==
Among his works are:

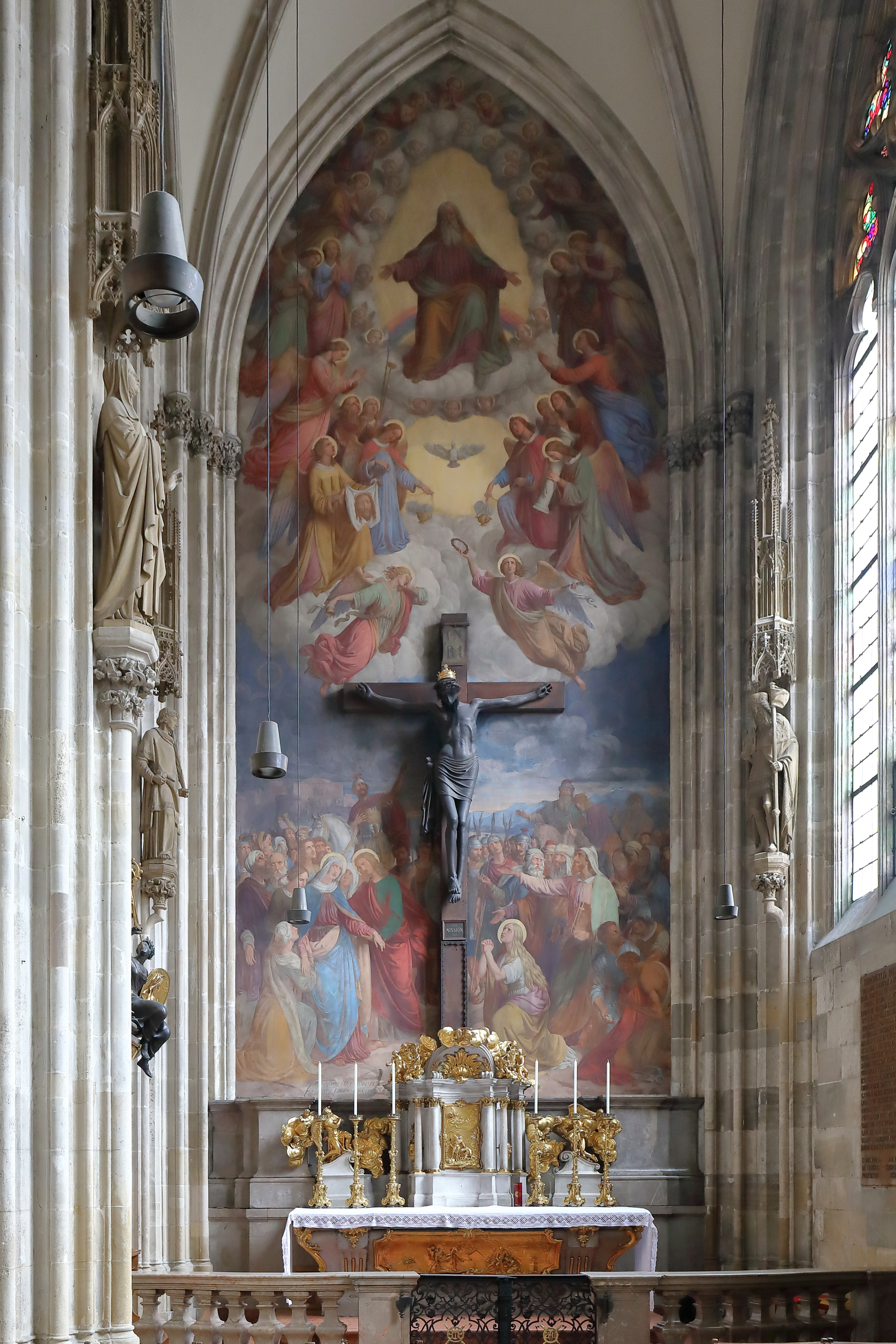
"Crucifixion" at St. Stephen's Cathedral (1853)

- “Madonna with Slumbering Christ Child” (Vienna Museum)
- “Marcus Aurelius on His Death Bed” (1814, Esterhazy Gallery)
- “The Crucifixion”, his masterpiece (a fresco in the Vienna Cathedral)
- “Orestes Pursued by the Furies” (1815)
- “Minerva Showing Ithaca to Ulysses” (1816)
- “Assumption” (1817)
- “Sleeping at Christ's Sepulchre” (1817)
- “Judith” (exhibited in 1824)
- “Miguel I of Portugal” (1827) (in the Queluz Palace)
- “From Darkness, the Light” or “Allegory of the Hungarian Academy of Sciences” (1831)
- “Bacchus Finding Ariadne”

== Sources ==
- Constantin von Wurzbach: "Ender, Johann Nepomuk." In: Biographisches Lexikon des Kaiserthums Oesterreich (Biographical Lexicon of the Empire of Austria). Part 4 Verlag der typogr.-literar.-artist. Anstalt (L. C. Zamarski, C. Dittmarsch & Comp.), Vienna 1858, p. 38–41 (digitalised).
- Heinrich Kábdebo (1877). "Ender, Johann" . Allgemeine Deutsche Biographie (in German). Vol. 6. Leipzig: Duncker & Humblot. pp. 105–106.
- "Ender Johann Nepomuk". In: Österreichisches Biographisches Lexikon 1815–1950 (ÖBL). Vol. 1, Austrian Academy of Sciences, Vienna 1957, p. 247.
