= Yuri Ender =

Russian painter

Yuri (Georgi) Vladimirovich Ender (Russian: Юрий (Георгий) Владимирович Эндер; 1898–1963) was a Russian painter, part of the avant-garde movement.

== Biography ==
Ender was born in 1898 in St. Petersburg. Born into a family with German roots, Ender was the youngest in the artistically inclined Ender family. He studied at the Petrograd Free Art Workshops (SVOMAS) under Mikhail Matyushin from 1918 to 1922. His studies in applied hydromechanics limited his participation in Matyushin's workshops compared to his siblings.

Ender was a member of the Matyushin circle and the Zorved group. Known for his studies on space, he contributed to the tradition of Organic Art. His works were exhibited in the 1923 Painting Exhibition of Petrograd Artists of All Directions, and later featured in international exhibitions.

== Legacy ==
Ender's works are part of the George Costakis collection, now in the Museum of Contemporary Art in Thessaloniki. Some of his works were showcased in the "El Cosmos de la Vanguardia Rusa" exhibition in Santander in 2010.

Several of his works are in the George Costakis Collection and have been housed in the State Museum of Contemporary Art since the collection was purchased in 1997 MOMus–Museum of Modern Art–Costakis Collection Thessaloniki. Two of these works were included in the 2010 exhibition El Cosmos de la Vanguardia Rusa shown in the exhibition hall of the Fundación Botín in Santander, with a watercolor serving as the cover image for the exhibition catalog.
