= Svomas =

Art schools in Russia

Svomas or SVOMAS (Russian: Свомас or СВОМАС), an abbreviation for Svobodnye gosudarstvennye khudozhestvennye masterskiye (Russian: Свободные Государственные художественные мастерские) (Free State Art Studios), was the name of a series of art schools founded in several Russian cities after the October Revolution.

The Moscow Svomas was founded in 1918, replacing the Stroganov Moscow State Academy of Arts and Industry (which became the First Free Art Studio), and the Moscow School of Painting, Sculpture, and Architecture (which became the Second Free Art Studio). In 1920, the school was replaced by Vkhutemas design school. The Petrograd Svomas was created in 1919 by renaming the Petrograd Free Art Educational Studios (Pegoskhuma), which had been formed a year earlier when the Academy of Arts was abolished; in 1921 it was replaced by the Petrograd State Art-Educational Studios of the Reconstructed Academy of Arts.

The aim of Svomas was to spread awareness of and competence in the arts to the previously underprivileged workers and peasants. Entrance examinations were abolished, art history courses were optional, the faculty was replaced by avant-garde artists, and students were free to choose their professors.
