= The Hive =

The Hive may refer to:

== Film and television ==
- The Hive (2008 film), an American film starring Tom Wopat
- The Hive (2014 film), an English film starring Gabriel Basso
- The Hive (2021 film), a Belgian film starring Ludivine Sagnier
- The Hive (Resident Evil), an underground lab in the 2002 film Resident Evil
- "The Hive" (Stargate Atlantis), an episode in the television series Stargate Atlantis
- Hive (Transformers), a group of characters in The Transformers TV cartoon
- The Hive (TV series), a 2010 animated kids series
- Hive (character), a Marvel Comics villain and character on Agents of S.H.I.E.L.D.

== Literature ==
- The Hive (Cela novel), (1950) by Spanish author Camilo José Cela
- The Hive (novella), (2004) by Star Wars author Steven Barnes
- The Hive (Card and Johnston novel), (2019) a novel in Orson Scott Card's Ender's Game series
- The Hive, a fictional entity in the Deltora Quest series

== Places ==
- The Hive, nickname of the Charlotte Coliseum
- The Hive Stadium, a football and Rugby League stadium in London, home to Barnet F.C. and the London Broncos
- The Hive (recording studio), a communal living space/recording studio run by the band 311
- The Hive, Worcester, a library and archival centre in Worcester, England
- The HIVE, a multimedia arts and technology centre in Mumbai, India
- The Hive, Singapore, a building in Singapore
- The Hive, colloquial name of the Sontag Center for Collaborative Creativity at the Claremont Colleges

== Video games ==
- The Hive, home of the Aliens in the computer game Aliens versus Predator 2
- The Hive (video game), a game released for PC and PlayStation in 1995
- The Hive, one of the four alien enemy factions found in the video game Destiny
- The Hive (server), a Minecraft minigame server

== Other uses ==
- The Hive (animation studio), Israeli animation studio
- The Hive (website), a once-popular web site for the discussion of the chemistry of mind-altering drugs
- The Hive, an online component of Vanity Fair

== See also ==
- Hive (disambiguation)
- The Hives, a Swedish rock band
