= Beehive (disambiguation) =

A beehive is a structure in which bees live and raise their young.

Beehive and Bee Hive may also refer to:

== Places and buildings ==
=== United Kingdom ===
- Beehive, Gatwick Airport, a building at London Gatwick Airport
- The Beehive, Marylebone, pub in London
- Beehive house, a type of stone building in Scotland and Ireland
- The Beehive, a recording studio in London
- The Beehive, one of the pubs and inns in Grantham, Lincolnshire

=== United States ===
- Bee Hive, Alabama, a neighborhood in Alabama
- Beehive, Kentucky, an unincorporated community
- Beehive Geyser, a geyser in Yellowstone National Park
- Beehive House, a historic home in Salt Lake City, Utah
- Beehive Peak, a mountain in Montana
- The Bee Hive, nickname of Braves Field, a baseball park in Boston, Massachusetts
- Beehive State, the state nickname of Utah

=== Elsewhere ===
- The Beehive, a wing of the New Zealand Parliament Buildings
- The Beehive (Alberta), a mountain in Banff National Park, Canada
- Beehive Corner or Beehive Building, a Neo-gothic building in Adelaide, South Australia
- Beehive tomb, a style of Mycenaean tomb from the Bronze Age
- Clochán or beehive hut, an ancient Irish dry stone structure

== Film and television ==
- The Beehive (1975 film), an Iranian Persian film
- The Beehive (1982 film) (La colmena), a Spanish film
- Beehive (TV series), a 2008 UK comedy series

== Music ==
- Bee Hive Records, a jazz record label
- Beehive (band), an electronic rock duo from Seattle, Washington
- Bee Hives, an album by Broken Social Scene
- Beehive Live, an album by Paul Gilbert
- "Beehive", a song by The Pillows

== Military ==
- Beehive (anti-aircraft shell), a weapon used by the Japanese Navy in World War II
- Beehive anti-personnel round, a type of anti-personnel artillery shell used by the US in the Vietnam War
- Beehive, a codename for units of the Szare Szeregi during World War II in Poland

== Computing ==
- Beehive Forum, Internet forum software
- Apache Beehive, a Java application development framework
- Oracle Beehive, a set of collaboration tools replacing Oracle Collaboration Suite

== Other uses ==
- Beehive (hairstyle), a hairstyle shaped like a beehive
- Beehive (LDS Church), a 12- or 13-year-old participant in the Young Women organization of The Church of Jesus Christ of Latter-day Saints
- The Bee-Hive (journal), a 19th-century British trade union newspaper
- Beehive burner, a conical wood waste burner
- Beehive Cluster, a cluster of stars
- Beehive quern, a neolithic device for grinding grain.
- Beehive stone, a conical rock formation found in Hungary
- Beehive fireworks, a pyrotechnic launch system used in the Feng Pao celebration of Yanshuei District in Tainan, Taiwan

== See also ==
- "Beyhive" (or "The Beyhive"), a term used to refer to fans of American R&B singer Beyoncé
- De Bijenkorf, a Dutch department store chain
- Hive (disambiguation)=
