= La Colmena =

La Colmena is Spanish for "the hive" or "the beehive". "La Colmena" may refer to:

- La Colmena, Paraguay, a city in Paraguay
- La colmena (film), a 1982 Spanish-language film
- La colmena, a computer game released in 1992 by the Spanish company Opera Soft
- The Hive (Cela novel), a 1951 Spanish-language novel by Camilo José Cela, entitled La Colmena in Spanish
- La Colmena, a nickname for Nicolás de Piérola Avenue in Lima
- La Colmena, another name for the Tacna-Colmena Building in Lima

== See also ==
- Beehive (disambiguation)
- Hive (disambiguation)
