= Hive =

A hive may refer to a beehive, an enclosed structure in which some honey bee species live and raise their young.

Hive or hives may also refer to:

== Arts ==
- Hive (game), an abstract-strategy board game published in 2001
- "Hive" (song), a 2013 song by Earl Sweatshirt featuring Vince Staples and Casey Veggies
- Hive (album), a 2022 album by alternative singer, producer, songwriter Sub Urban
- "Hives", a song by IBOPA and later covered by Xiu Xiu as "Hives Hives" on the album Knife Play
- H.I.V.E. ("Hierarchy of International Vengeance and Extermination"), a DC Comics villain organization
- H.I.V.E. (series) ("Higher Institute of Villainous Education"), a series of young-adult novels
- Hive Propolis, stylized as hive | Propolis, a science fiction transmedia series
- Hive (character), a Marvel Comics villain and character on Agents of S.H.I.E.L.D.
- The Hives, a Swedish rock band
- Star Trek: The Next Generation – Hive, a Star Trek four-issue comic book limited series published by IDW Publishing (September 2012–February 2013)

== Business ==
- Hive (artificial intelligence company), services for businesses, known for content moderation
- HIVE (ISP), an ISP in Iceland, founded in 2004
- Hive Social, a social network

== Film and television ==
- The Hive (2008 film), an American science fiction television film
- The Hive (2014 film), an American science fiction horror film
- Hives (film), a 2012 Croatian anthology film
- Hive (2021 film), a Kosovan drama film
- Hive (2026 film), a Canadian horror thriller film
- MTV Hive, a former web portal operated by MTV
- The Hive, an online component of Vanity Fair (magazine)
- The Hive, an alien race in the television series Dark Skies (TV series)
- "Hive", a season 3 episode of Servant (TV series)

== Medicine ==
- Hives, also called urticaria, a common form of skin rash
- HIVE, HIV encephalitis

== Places ==
- Hive, East Riding of Yorkshire, England
- Vestfold University College (Høgskolen i Vestfold, HiVe), a Norwegian university college

== Technology ==
- Hive, a highest-level logical section in the Windows Registry
- Apache Hive, a data warehouse infrastructure built on top of Hadoop
- Hive Connected Home, a home automation platform
- High-performance Integrated Virtual Environment, a computing environment used to process biological data
- HIVE (virtual environment), a research project at Miami University
- Hive UI, a custom ROM for the Android operating system
- std::hive, a collection in the C++ Standard Library which implements an object pool

== Other ==
- Hives (surname)
- Hive BC, a basketball team based in Miami, Florida
- Hive (1820), a 485-ton sailing ship built in 1820 at Deptford, England
- Hive (ransomware), a ransomware as a service (RaaS) operation

== See also ==
- The Hive (disambiguation)
- Hive mind (disambiguation)
