= Lava Iris X9 =

Type of phone

LAVA Iris X9
- Manufacturer: LAVA
- Type: Smart phone
- First released: June 4, 2015, India
- Predecessor: Iris X8
- Successor: Iris X10
- Dimensions: 9mm thickness, 76mm width, 152mm height
- Weight: 145 g (5 oz)
- Operating system: Android Lollipop
- GPU: Mali-400 MP2
- Memory: 2GB RAM
- Storage: 16GB ROM
- Battery: Li-polymer 2650mAh
- Rear camera: 13MP
- Front camera: 8MP
- Display: 5.5' 1280x720 pixels
- Connectivity: Bluetooth, USB microusb 2.0
- Data inputs: touch screen
- Model: Iris X9
- Other: Wifi hotspot
- Website: www.lavamobiles.com

Lava Iris X9 is an android based smartphone from the manufacturer Lava mobiles. It is equipped with a quad-core processor. It includes features like 13 MP back camera and 8 MP front camera. Memory capacity of this mobile includes 2 GB RAM and 16 GB ROM. Input is given via touch screen.
