= Blaze Mountain =

Mountain in Montana, United States

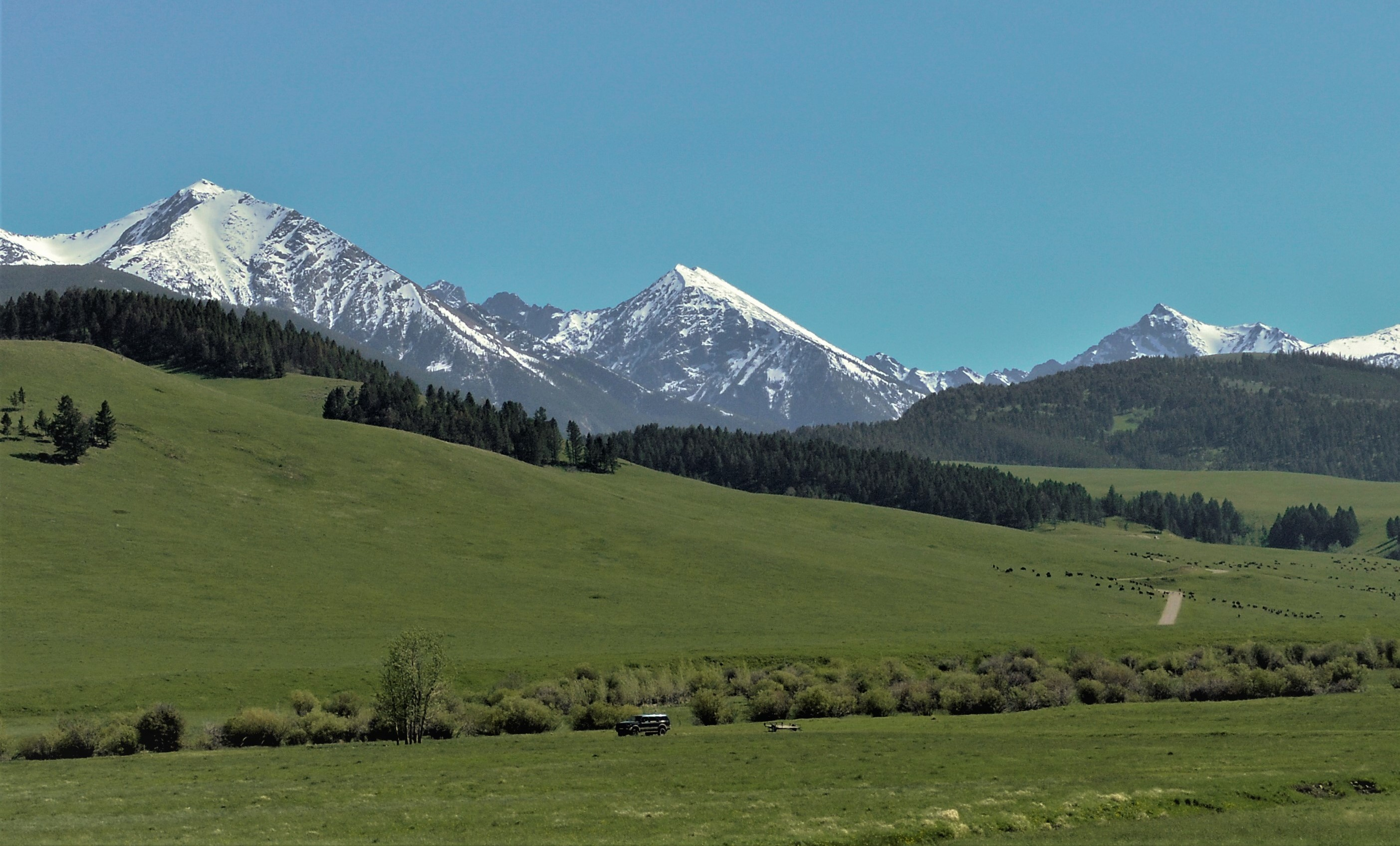
- North aspect, centered in the distance

Highest point
- Elevation: 10,384 ft (3,165 m)
- Prominence: 484 ft (148 m)
- Parent peak: Beehive Peak (10,740 ft)
- Isolation: 1.05 mi (1.69 km)
- Listing: Mountains of Montana
- Coordinates: 45°22′07″N 111°24′43″W

Naming
- Etymology: Blaze

Geography
- Location within Montana Location within the United States
- Country: United States
- State: Montana
- County: Madison County
- Protected area: Lee Metcalf Wilderness
- Parent range: Rocky Mountains; Madison Range; Spanish Peaks
- Topo map: USGS Lone Mountain

Blaze Mountain is a 10,384-foot (3,165-metre) summit located in Madison County, Montana, United States.

== Description ==
Blaze Mountain is located in the Spanish Peaks which is a subrange of the Madison Range. It is situated nine miles (14 km) north-northwest of Big Sky, Montana, and 25 miles (40 km) southwest of Bozeman. The peak is set within the Lee Metcalf Wilderness on land managed by Gallatin National Forest. Precipitation runoff from the mountain drains into South Fork Spanish Creek → Spanish Creek → Gallatin River → Missouri River. Topographic relief is significant as the summit rises 3,000 feet (910 meters) above South Fork Spanish Creek in one mile (1.6 km). The mountain's descriptive toponym was submitted by the US Forest Service and officially adopted in 1930 by the United States Board on Geographic Names. It is so named because the mountain is marked with a white strip from the snow in a narrow draw on its west face which does not melt during the summer.

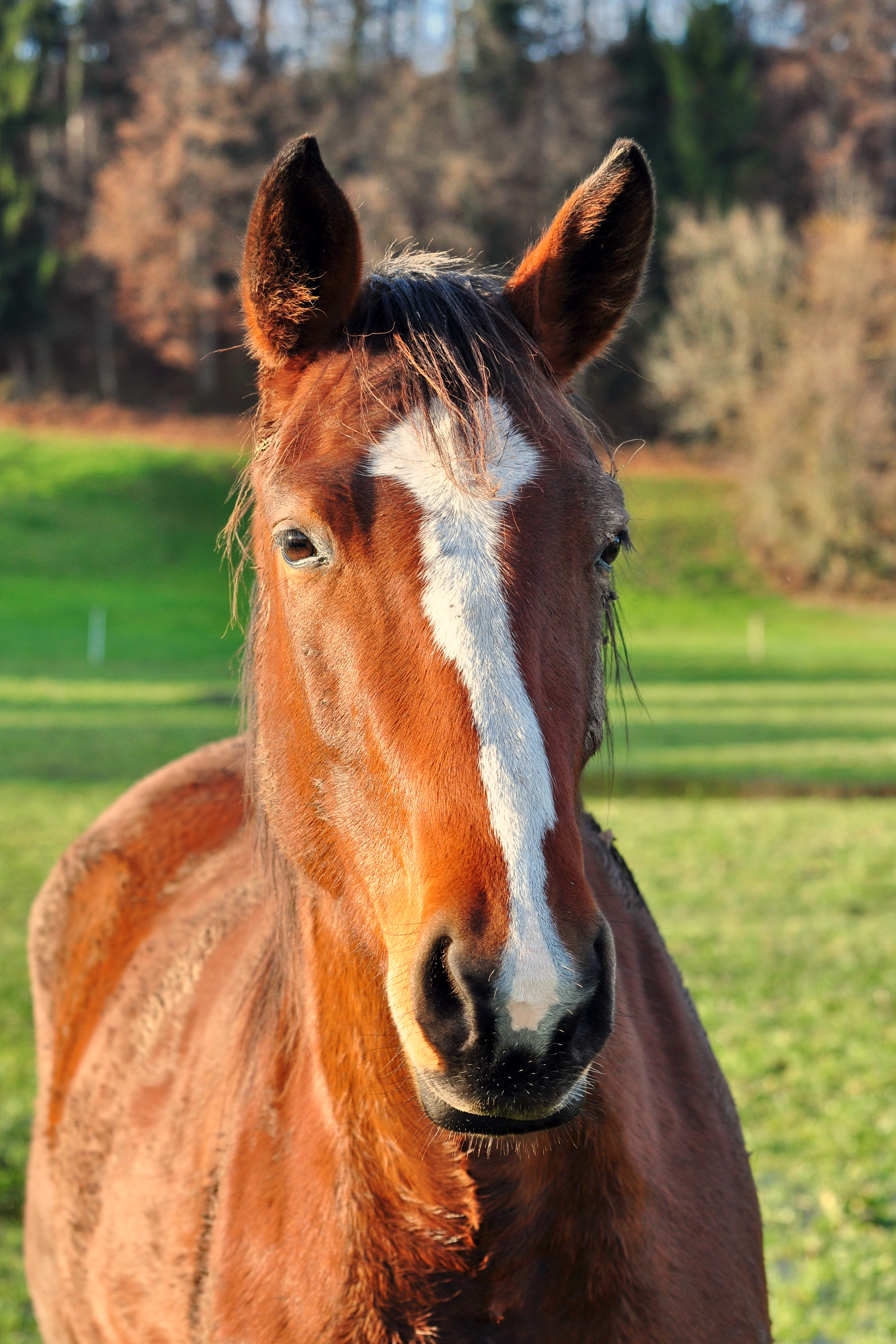
Horse with white blaze

== Climate ==
Based on the Köppen climate classification, Blaze Mountain is located in a subarctic climate zone characterized by long, usually very cold winters, and short, cool to mild summers. Winter temperatures can drop below −10 °F with wind chill factors below −30 °F.

== See also ==
- Geology of the Rocky Mountains
- Mountains of Madison County, Montana

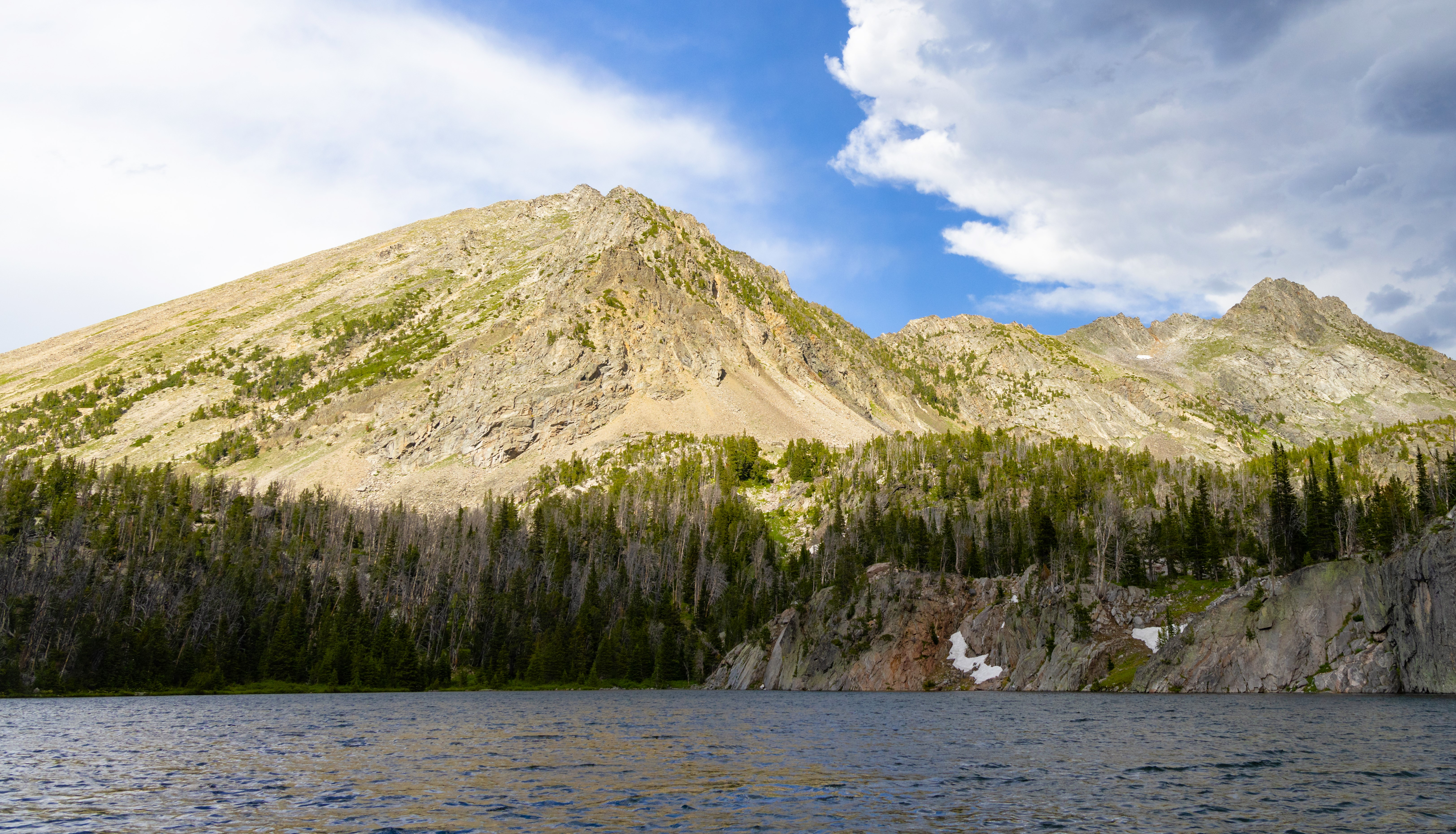
Southwest aspect of Blaze Mountain (left), from Spanish Lakes
