= La Ruche =

La Ruche may refer to:

- La Ruche (residence), artists' residence in Paris
- La Ruche (school), early 1900s anarchist school outside Paris

== See also ==
- Beehive (disambiguation)
