= Xolo =

Xolo may refer to:

- Xoloitzcuintle, a dog breed sometimes known as a "Xolo" or "Mexican Hairless Dog"
- Xolo (company), an Indian smart device company
- Xolos, or Club Tijuana, a Mexican association football team
- Xolo Maridueña, an American actor
