= T. S. Cook =

American screenwriter

- Born: Thomas Steven Cook; August 25, 1947; Cleveland, Ohio, U.S.
- Died: January 5, 2013 (aged 65); Los Angeles, California, U.S.
- Occupations: Screenwriter, producer
- Years active: 1975–2008
- Spouse: Marie Monique de Varennes

Thomas Steven Cook (August 25, 1947 – January 5, 2013) was an American screenwriter and producer, who wrote The China Syndrome (1979) with Mike Gray and James Bridges, which garnered him Academy Award and Golden Globe Award nominations.

== Early life ==
Thomas Steven Cook was born in Cleveland to Horace William, a business executive, and Betty Marion Cook (née Thompson), a homemaker. He began working as a technical editor in 1974 at the engineering and manufacturing company ITT Gilfillan in Panorama City, California. In 1984, Cook was hired as a lecturer at the University of Nevada.

== Career ==
As a writer, Cook has written several television movies. He got his first writing credit with the 1979 thriller film The China Syndrome, which earned him Oscar and Golden Globe-nominations for Best Screenplay. He continued his career by writing episodes of shows, such as Project UFO (1978), and Airwolf (1984). For Nightbreaker (1989), Cook received Writers Guild of America Award. He received an Emmy nomination for Outstanding Individual Achievement in Writing for a Miniseries or a Special, sharing with Paris Qualles, Trey Ellis, Ron Hutchinson, and Robert Williams for The Tuskegee Airmen (1995). By the 2000s, he wrote The Hive (2008), and NYC: Tornado Terror (2008), both of them which aired on Syfy.

== Personal life ==
Cook was married to homemaker and writer Marie Monique de Varennes. He died from complications of cancer on January 5, 2013.

== Filmography ==
=== Screenwriter ===
- Baretta (1975)
- The Paper Chase (1978)
- Project UFO (1978)
- The China Syndrome (1979)
- Scared Straight! Another Story (1980) (TV)
- We're Fighting Back (1981) (TV)
- Red Flag: The Ultimate Game (1984) (TV)
- Attack on Fear (1984) (TV)
- Airwolf (1984)
- Out of the Darkness (1985) (TV)
- Nightbreaker (1989) (TV)
- High Desert Kill (1989) (TV)
- In the Line of Duty: Street War (1992) (TV)
- The Switch (1993) (TV)
- Texas Justice (1995) (TV)
- The Tuskegee Airmen (1995) (TV)
- Forgotten Sins (1996) (TV)
- One Step Too Far (1998) (TV)
- High Noon (2000) (TV)
- Lucy (2003) (TV)
- The Hive (2008) (TV)
- NYC: Tornado Terror (2008) (TV)
