= The Swarm (Card and Johnston novel) =

Book by Orson Scott Card and Aaron Johnston

- Author: Orson Scott Card and Aaron Johnston
- Cover artist: John Harris
- Language: English
- Series: Ender's Game series
- Genre: Science fiction
- Publisher: Tor Books
- Publication date: August 2, 2016
- Publication place: United States
- Media type: Print (Hardcover)
- Pages: 462 (Hardcover)
- ISBN: 978-0-7653-7562-9
- OCLC: 953833134
- Preceded by: Earth Awakens
- Followed by: The Hive

Chart

Short Stories	Novels	Comics	Audioplay	Film

First Meetings (in the Enderverse) (2002 (2003)) Ender's Game Investment Counselor The Polish Boy Teacher's Pest
OSCs InterGalactic; Medicine Show (2008) Mazer in Prison Cheater Pretty Boy A Young Man with Prospects
Cheater (2006)
Ender's Shadow (1999) (Note: The events of Ender's Game, Ender's Shadow and A War of Gifts take place in roughly the same time period. The events of A War of Gifts only take place during the time at Battle School).) Ender's Shadow: Battle School (2009) Command School (2010) Ultimate collection (2012)
The Shadow Trilogy (Note: The events of Ender in Exile and the Shadow Trilogy take place in roughly the same time period.: First part of Ender in Exile (2/3) takes place during the Shadow Trilogy.; Last part of Ender in Exile (1/3) takes places after Shadow of the Giant.) (Note: Note on the following (maybe not yet so common) Trilogies: "Speaker Trilogy": Original set of sequels to Ender's Game, also referred to as: "Ender Quartet" (Ender's Game combined with "Speaker Trilogy"), also referred to as: "Ender Quintet" ("Ender Quartet" combined with Ender in Exile).; "Shadow Trilogy": Original set of sequels to Ender's Shadow, also referred to as: "Bean Quartet"/"Shadow Quartet" (Ender's Shadow combined with "Shadow Trilogy"), also referred to as: "Bean Quintet"/"Shadow Quintet" ("Bean Quartet" combined with Shadows in Flight), could be referred to as: "Bean Sextet"/"Shadow Sextet" ("Bean Quintet" combined with The Last Shadow)) Shadow of the Hegemon (2001) Shadow Puppets (2002) Shadow of the Giant (2005)
Shadows in Flight (2012)
Messenger (2018)
The Last Shadow (2021)

Formic Wars: Burning Earth (2011) Formic Wars: Silent Strike (2012)	First Formic; War Trilogy Earth Unaware (2012) Earth Afire (2013) Earth Awakens (2014)
Second Formic; War Trilogy The Swarm (2016) The Hive (2019) The Queens (TBA)
Mazer in Prison (2005)	Mazer in Prison (2010)
Pretty Boy (2006)
Ender's Game; Alive (2013) Recruiting Valentine (2009) The League War (2010)	Ender's Game (1977) Ender's Game (1985) Ender's Game: Battle School (2009) Command School (2010) Ultimate collection (2012) Ender's Game (2013)
Ender's Homecoming (2008) A Young Man with Prospects (2007) Ender in Flight (2008) The Gold Bug (2007)	Ender in Exile (2008) Ender in Exile (2011) Gold Bug (2010)
Governor Wiggin (2017)
Investment Counselor (1999)
Speaker for the Dead (2011) Gloriously Bright (1991)	The Speaker Trilogy Speaker for the Dead (1986) Xenocide (1991) Children of the Mind (1996)

War of Gifts (2010) Mazer in Prison Recruiting Valentine The League War War of Gifts
The Polish Boy (2002)
Teacher's Pest (2003)
Ender's Stocking (2007) A War of Gifts (2007) War of Gifts (2009)
Fleet School (Note: Title is also mentioned in regard to a possible sequel for the film.) Children of the Fleet (2017)... (TBC)
Renegat (2017)

The Swarm is a 2016 science fiction novel by American writers Orson Scott Card and Aaron Johnston, and the first book of the Second Formic Wars trilogy of novels in the Ender's Game series. It was released on August 2, 2016.

== Plot ==
The first invasion of Earth was beaten back by a coalition of corporate and international military forces, and the Chinese army, but China has been devastated by the Formics' initial efforts to eradicate Earth life forms and prepare the ground for their own settlement. The Scouring of China struck fear into the other nations of the planet; that fear blossomed into drastic action when scientists determined that the single ship that wreaked such damage was merely a scout ship. Earth's government has been reorganized for defense; it now comprises a Hegemon, a planetary official responsible for keeping all the formerly warring nations in line, and a Polemarch, responsible for organizing all the military forces of the planet into the new International Fleet. But ambition and politics, greed and self-interest remain, as important members of the military continue to place their career prospects ahead of Earth's defense. It is up to Bingwen, Mazer Rackam, Victor Delgado and Lem Jukes to create a weapon that can effectively defend humanity.

== Series ==
The book is the first of the Second Formic War trilogy by Card and Johnston. The projected titles for the second and third books are The Hive and The Queens respectively. The Hive was released on June 11, 2019.

== See also ==
- List of Ender's Game characters
- Orson Scott Card bibliography
