= In the Line of Duty: Street War =

1992 television film directed by Dick Lowry

- Movie cover
- Genre: Action; Drama; Thriller
- Based on: "Living Large" by Mark Kriegel
- Written by: T. S. Cook
- Directed by: Dick Lowry
- Starring: Ray Sharkey; Peter Boyle; Mario Van Peebles; Michael Boatman; Morris Chestnut; Courtney B. Vance
- Music by: Mark Snow
- Country of origin: United States
- Original language: English

Production
- Executive producers: T.S. Cook; Kenneth Kaufman; Tom Patchett
- Producer: Dick Lowry
- Production locations: Atlanta; Brooklyn, New York
- Cinematography: Frank Beascoechea
- Editor: Anita Brandt Burgoyne
- Running time: 96 minutes
- Production companies: Patchett Kaufman Entertainment; World International Network

Original release
- Network: NBC
- Release: October 25, 1992

In the Line of Duty: Street War is an American action film which was released in 1992. It is about a New York City Housing Authority policeman whose partner is killed and he seeks revenge for the killing.

== Cast ==
- Peter Boyle as Det. Dan Reilly
- Courtney B. Vance as Justice Butler
- Morris Chestnut as Prince Franklin
- Mario Van Peebles as Raymond Williamson
