= Hives (surname) =

Hives is a surname. Notable people with the surname include:

- Ernest Hives, 1st Baron Hives of Duffield (1886-1965), Chairman of Rolls-Royce Ltd
- Harry Hives (1901–1974), Canadian Anglican bishop
- Zoe Hives (born 1996), Australian tennis player

== See also ==
- Baron Hives, a Peerage of the United Kingdom
- Hives (disambiguation)
