= Nightbreaker (film) =

1989 television film directed by Peter Markle

- Film poster
- Inspired by: Atomic Soldiers: American Victims of Nuclear Experiments by Howard L. Rosenberg
- Written by: T. S. Cook
- Directed by: Peter Markle
- Starring: Martin Sheen; Emilio Estevez; Lea Thompson
- Composer: Peter Bernstein
- Country of origin: United States
- Original language: English

Production
- Executive producers: Martin Sheen; Jeffrey Auerbach
- Producer: William R. Greenblatt
- Cinematography: Ronald Víctor García
- Editor: Stephen E. Rivkin
- Running time: 99 minutes
- Production companies: Symphony Pictures; Wisdom Productions; Companionway Films

Original release
- Network: TNT
- Release: March 8, 1989

Nightbreaker (also known as Advance to Ground Zero) is a 1989 American historical drama television film directed by Peter Markle and written by T. S. Cook, inspired by the book Atomic Soldiers: American Victims of Nuclear Experiments by Howard L. Rosenberg. The film stars Martin Sheen and Emilio Estevez as older and younger versions of fictional neurologist Alexander Brown. It also stars Lea Thompson, Melinda Dillon, and Joe Pantoliano.

== Plot ==
Dr. Alexander Brown (played by Sheen in framing scenes and Estevez in flashbacks) reflects on his involvement in the exposure of American soldiers to radiation in the proving grounds in Nevada in the 1950s after he is approached by a man who is dying of cancer due to the tests.

== Cast ==
- Martin Sheen as Alexander Brown (1980s)
- Emilio Estevez as Alexander Brown (1950s)
- Joe Pantoliano as Sergeant Jack Russell
- Lea Thompson as Sally Matthews
- Melinda Dillon as Paula Brown
- Paul Eiding as Roscoe Cummings
- Geoffrey Blake as Python
- James Marshall as Barney Immerman
