= Spanish Peaks (Montana) =

Mountain range in Montana, United States

- Location within Montana

Highest point
- Peak: Gallatin Peak
- Elevation: 11,015 ft (3,357 m)
- Coordinates: 45°23′13″N 111°25′39″W

Geography
- Country: United States
- State: Montana
- Parent range: Madison Range

Geology
- Rock type: 1.6 billion year-old Gneiss

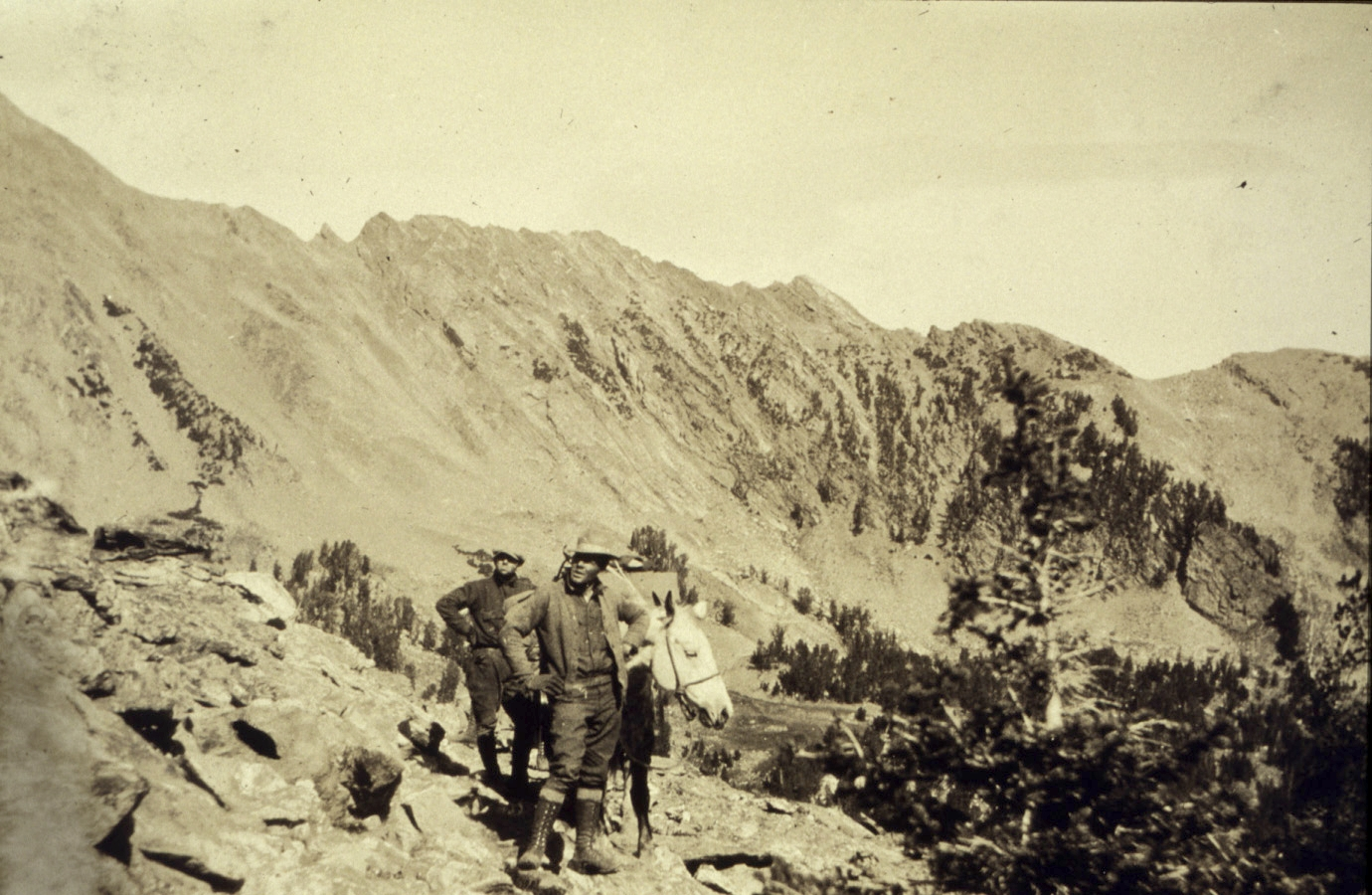
"Climbing" of Gallatin Peak in 1922 by the Triangulation party of William M. Scaife.

The Spanish Peaks, avg el. 8,441 feet (2,573 m), is a mountain range between Bozeman, Montana and Ennis, Montana in Gallatin and Madison County, Montana. It is a sub-range of the much larger Madison Range, itself a sub-range of the Rocky Mountains. The hydrological divide of the range serves as the border between Gallatin and Madison County, Montana. The Spanish Peaks are made up of 1.6 billion year-old gneiss, making them the oldest peaks in the Madison Range, predating the rest of the range by 50-60 million years. Gallatin Peak, el. 11,015 ft., is the highest peak in the group.

== See also ==
- List of mountain ranges in Montana
- Blaze Mountain
- Beehive Peak
