= Hive Social =

Social App

- Website type: Social networking service
- Available in: Multilingual
- Founded: June 5, 2019; 7 years ago
- Area served: Worldwide
- Owner: Hive
- Founder: Kassandra Pop
- CEO: Kassandra Pop
- Website: www.hivesocial.app
- Registration: Required
- Users: 1 million
- Launched: October 2019; 6 years ago
- Current status: Active
- Native clients on: Android; iOS

Hive Social is a microblogging service and mobile app. It was developed by Raluca Pop, also known as Kassandra Pop, with the help of a freelance developer.

The first version launched on the Apple App Store in October 2019. A beta version for Android was released via the Google Play store on November 10, 2022. The app has been described as a hybrid between Twitter, Instagram and Tumblr, with text, image and video posts supported. Hive is rated for ages 17+ and explicit images are permitted, including sexual intercourse, genitalia and nude close-ups. Hive features a chronological timeline with no personalisation algorithms, while profiles offer a MySpace-like song playing feature.

The app received news coverage during the acquisition of Twitter by Elon Musk in November 2022. As of November 2022, the app reached number one on the top free social apps on the App Store and has over one million user accounts, despite email verification limits being reached. This spike in growth may be attributed to those who were leaving Twitter due to the controversy that ensued following Elon Musk's purchase of Twitter on October 27, 2022.

On 30 November 2022, "zerforschung", a German hacker collective, published information about severe security issues with Hive Social, among them the possibility to access all personal data, including private posts, private messages, shared media and even deleted direct messages. This also included private email addresses and phone numbers entered during login. Attackers could also overwrite data such as posts owned by other users. In response to the publication of the security report, Hive abruptly shut down their service to attempt to address the vulnerabilities. As of December 15, 2022, Hive's servers were back online and the platform returned online. The app also left beta on Android devices and saw a full release on the Google Play Store. Some features were disabled in the 2.0.0 update after the shutdown, such as direct messages, music, and polls.

== See also ==
- Bluesky
- Mastodon (social network)
