= Lava International =

Indian multinational technology company

Lava International Limited
- The Lava logo as of 2025

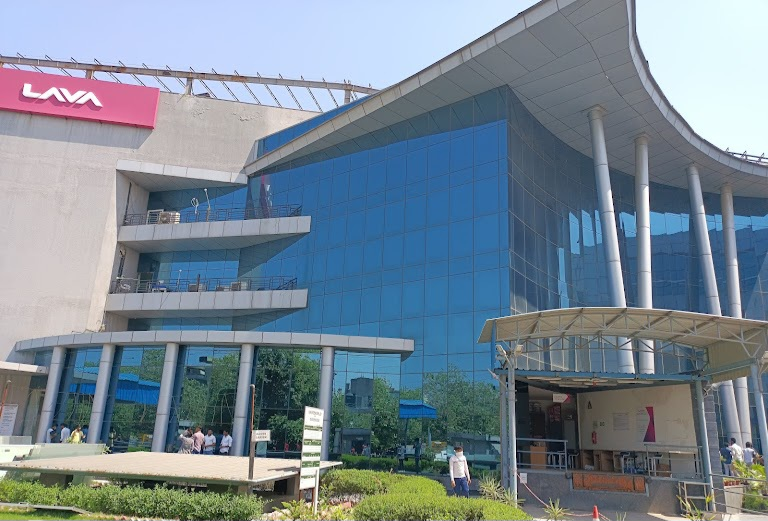
- Headquarters of Lava International in Noida, India
- Trade name: Lava Mobiles
- Type: Private
- ISIN: INE745X01014
- Industry: Technology; Telecommunications; Consumer electronics Computer hardware
- Founded: 27 March 2009; 17 years ago
- Founders: Vishal Sehgal; Hari Om Rai; Shailendra Nath Rai; Sunil Bhalla
- Headquarters: Noida, Uttar Pradesh, India
- Area served: Worldwide
- Key people: Sunil Raina (MD)
- Products: Smartphones; Mobile phones; Laptops; Smartwatches; Tablet computers; Peripherals; Datacards; Software
- Services: Electronics manufacturing services
- Revenue: ▲₹3,667 crore (US$390 million) (FY 2023-24)
- Operating income: ▲₹103 crore (US$11 million) (FY 2023-24)
- Net income: ▲₹11.59 crore (US$1.2 million) (FY 2023-24)
- Total assets: ▲₹1,650.2 crore (US$180 million) (FY 2023-24)
- Number of employees: 5000+ (2025)
- Subsidiaries: Xolo
- Website: lavamobiles.com

Lava International (stylized as LΛVΛ) is an Indian multinational technology company that manufactures smartphones, tablets, laptops, computer hardware, and other consumer electronics. Founded on 27 March 2009 by Vishal Sehgal, Hari Om Rai, Shailendra Nath Rai, and Sunil Bhalla, the company operates under the Lava brand name. It is headquartered in Noida, Uttar Pradesh, India, and serves markets across South Asia, the Middle East, Africa, and several other regions worldwide.

Lava operates in numerous countries, including India, Nepal, Bhutan, Bangladesh, Peru, Qatar, Sri Lanka, Burundi, South Sudan, Vietnam, Guatemala, the United States, the United Arab Emirates, Kenya, Nigeria, Saudi Arabia, Kuwait, Bahrain, Oman, Egypt, Ghana, Mexico, Papua New Guinea, Switzerland, the British Virgin Islands, Taiwan, Somalia, Mauritius, Ireland, Israel, Sweden, Greece, and the United Kingdom (since early 2026).

Benco which is owned by Chinese electronics manufacturer INONE technology uses the name "Lava Benco" in many markets with license from Lava since 2019.

In 2021, Lava revamped its product lineup with the launch of the AGNI series, aimed at revitalizing the brand and increasing market share in the Indian smartphone segment.

== Research and Development ==
Lava has developed research and development facilities in India, supported by the government's Make in India and Atmanirbhar Bharat initiatives. The company primarily designs and develops its products domestically.

== Market Share ==
During the financial year 2023, Lava held approximately 25% market share in the Indian feature phone segment. In 2025, Lava International lead Indian mobile brands with a 2–3% overall market share, followed by other brands such as Micromax, Karbonn, and Xolo, each with less than 1%.

== Notable Products ==
- The first smartphone under the Benco brand, the Lava Benco V8, launched on 4 November 2019.
- Lava Pulse, the first feature phone with heart rate and blood pressure sensors, launched on 20 August 2020.
- Lava Agni 5G, the first India-made 5G smartphone, launched on 9 November 2021.
- Lava PRO Watch ZN, the first smartwatch under the brand, launched on 23 April 2024.
- Lava Agni 3 5G, India’s first AMOLED dual-screen smartphone with an AMOLED rear display and an action button, launched on 4 October 2024.
- The Play Ultra and Play Max, India's first mild gaming focused models, launched in 2025.
- Vayu AI, an AI assistant made by Lava Mobiles.

== Current Products ==
- AGNI 5G flagship series, launched on 9 November 2021.
- Blaze series, launched on 14 July 2022, suspected discontinued.
- Yuva series, launched on 11 October 2022, suspected discontinued.
- Storm series, launched on 28 December 2023, suspected discontinued.
- O series, launched on 4 October 2023, discontinued.
- Bold series, launched on 2 April 2025.
- Shark series, launched on 25 March 2025.
- Play series for mild gaming, launched on 25 August 2025.
- Virat series, launched on 4 September 2026.
- Aura series, launched on 21 October 2026.
- Additional product lines include Prowatch series smartwatches, Probuds series earphones, S-series tablets, Prowatt powerbanks, and feature phones.

== Awards and Honours ==
Lava was awarded the "Fastest Growing Mobile Phone Indian Brand" by the Communications Multimedia and Infrastructure (CMAI) Association of India during the 5th National Telecom Awards in 2011. The company also received the "Emerging Company of the Year" award from the Voice & Data Telecom Leadership Forum Awards in 2013. Additionally, it earned recognition from the Government of Uttar Pradesh in July 2017 for hiring the highest number of apprentices in the state in 2016, with 710 apprentices in compliance with the Apprenticeship Act, 1961.

== See also ==
- List of mobile phone brands by country
- List of companies of India
- Micromax Informatics
- Karbonn Mobiles
- Intex Technologies
- Spice
- Xolo
