= HIVE (virtual environment) =

Human cognitive research project

The H.I.V.E. (Huge Immersive Virtual Environment) is a joint research project between the departments of Psychology, Computer Science, and Systems Analysis at Miami University. The project is funded by a grant from the U.S. Army Research Office and is currently the world's largest virtual environment in terms of navigable floor area (currently over 1200m^{2}). The goal of the research project is to conduct experiments in human spatial cognition.

== System Components ==
The H.I.V.E. platform consists of several components, including:

- Position-Tracking Camera Array
- Wearable Rendering System
