= Xolo (company) =

Indian mobile handset brand

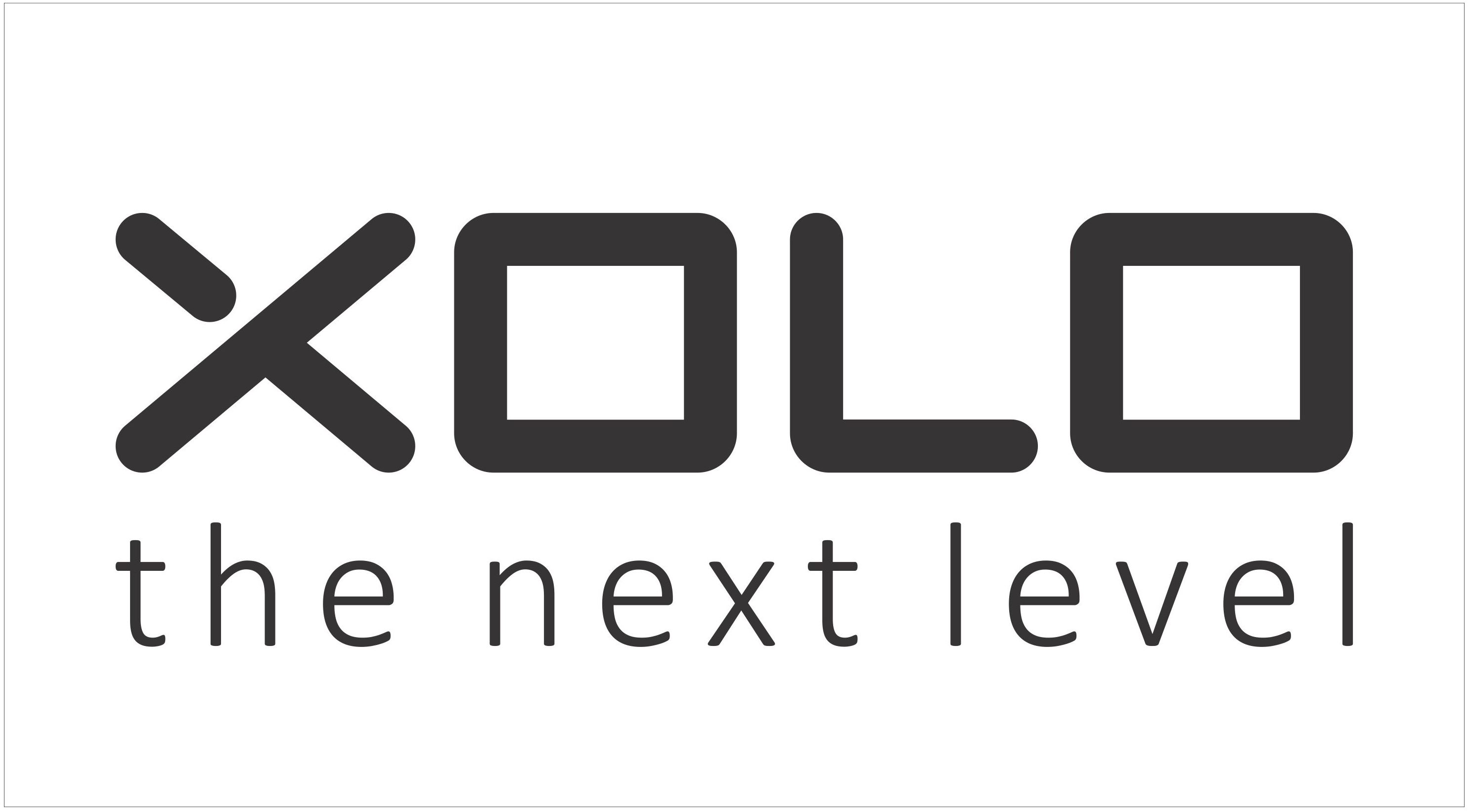
- Type: Subsidiary
- Founded: 2012
- Headquarters: Sector 64, Noida, Uttar Pradesh, India
- Area served: India, UAE
- Key people: Vishal Sehgal (Co-Founder & Director – Lava International Ltd.); Sunil Raina (Business Head)
- Products: Smartphones; Tablet computers; Hive UI; Laptops
- Parent: Lava
- Website: www.xolo.in

Xolo, stylised as XOLO, is an Indian mobile handset brand by Lava International. It manufactures personal electronics devices such as smartphones, tablets and laptops, and accessories such as powerbanks.

In April 2012, Xolo launched India's first smartphone with an Intel processor, the Xolo X900. Xolo was the first Indian manufacturer to partner with AMD to launch a tablet, the Xolo Win tablet. This was followed by the first 4G-enabled smartphone in India, the LT900, in December 2013. On 6 January 2014, Liverpool FC announced Xolo as its first regional partner in India. Xolo launched one of the first dual camera phones in India, Xolo Black, in July 2015 in an exclusive partnership with India's largest online marketplace, Flipkart. Xolo Era series was launched in July 2015 in an exclusive partnership with Snapdeal.

Xolo uses various series of MediaTek processors in its smartphones. Xolo focuses on online retail through Amazon and Flipkart.

== Smartphones ==
=== Android phones ===
Xolo offers Android smartphones in the series: Era, Black, Q, Omega and Play. The company sells its devices only via online marketplaces/ e-commerce websites such as Snapdeal, Flipkart and Amazon.

Era series handsets are priced from INR 5,000 to 10,000, whereas Black series ones are priced above Rs. 10,000.

Different models introduced in the Xolo Era series: Era (launched in July 2015), Era HD (October 2015), Era 4G (February 2016), Era 4K (February 2016), Era X (February 2016), Era 2 (October 2016), Era 1X (September 2016), Era 2X (January 2017), Era 2V (October 2017), Era 3 (October 2017), Era 3X (October 2017), and Era 4X (January 2019).

Xolo Black series: Black (launched in July 2015), Black 1X (October 2015).

Xolo Q series: Q700 (2014), Q1000 Opus (2013), Q2000 (2013), Q3000 (2013), Q1010i (2014).
Other notable smartphones:
Xolo Omega 5.0 and Omega 5.5.
Xolo One Liverpool FC limited-edition smartphone, launched on 14 May 2015.
Xolo Cube 5.0 (2015)
Xolo One HD (2015)

=== Windows Phone devices ===
Xolo Win series: Win Q900s (launched in 2014), Win Q1000 (2015), Win (2015)

== Tablets ==
Xolo launched an Android tablet in 2014 called Xolo Play Tegra which ran MediaTek Helio 66.

== Laptop ==
- Xolo Chromebook, launched in 2015, operated by Android Auto. A fingerprint sensor, 2K resolution, USB, HDMI, AUX, Bluetooth, and WiFi are installed, powered By Google.

== Marketing ==
In 2013, Xolo signed Bollywood actor Ayushmann Khurrana to endorse its products.
