= The HIVE =

The Hive (also spelled The HIVE) is a multimedia arts and technology centre in Bandra, Mumbai, India, that has been running since 2010.

The centre was founded by Sudeip Nair and Sharin Bhatti, who wanted to see more entertainment shows in Mumbai and were frustrated by the lack of space available to small startups. The complex includes performance areas, a recording studio and offices. The facilities support hot desking.

Events have been well received. The centre has been described by The Guardian as "one giant lab-meets-playground inside a fantastical magical bungalow".
