= Beehive (band) =

American electronic rock duo

- Origin: Seattle, Washington, USA
- Genres: Pop, rock, electronica
- Years active: 2004–present
- Labels: Independent
- Members: Butterfly Beats; David Miller
- Website: Official website

Beehive is a pop and electronica duo from Seattle, Washington. The band began as a studio project between two close friends, Alethea (AKA Butterfly Beats) and David Miller. Beehive combines the new electronic music forms with classic pop hooks and rock attitude. Songs by Beehive have been licensed by MTV shows such as Cheyenne, The Real World and Road Rules. In 2006, the band was nominated in the Seattle Weekly 2006 Music Awards. In December 2007 Beehive released their album Pretty Little Thieves and has worked with Planetary Group for radio promotion as well as Buddy Buddy for licensing and GoDigital Media Group for label representation.

== History ==
Beehive began while Beats and Miller were studying neurobiology together at the University of Washington. Not long after they had finished their studies, the two realized a musical career was in their future.

They started to record songs that they wrote together in a back-and-forth process, each layering on some new idea, melody or riff. Eventually, they took their work public, and found themselves performing at clubs and festivals throughout the Pacific Northwest. Their high energy live shows earned them a devoted following, and they started to get radio airplay with the release of Cycle A. "Kaiser So-Say", an instrumental track that's included on Operation Artichoke, as well as the songs, "Fear", "Love I Know" "One" and "Oath of Gold" from the demo Cycle A were licensed for MTV on the shows The Real World, Road Rules, and Cheyenne. Beehive's late 2007 release Pretty Little Thieves continues to be licensed for shows such as the CW 90210, The Real World: Hollywood, Bad Girls Club, Keeping Up with the Kardashians, The Real World, and VH1's Old Skool as well as the soundtrack to the film Loaded. Beehive's label for their album Pretty Little Thieves is GoDigital Media Group, and their licensing agent is Buddy Buddy Licensing, who started to work with Beehive in 2008.

== Members ==
- Alethea — laptop, keyboards, production, drums, vocals
- David Miller — guitar, slide guitar, bass, keyboards, vocals

== Discography ==
- Cycle A, Demo 2005
- Operation Artichoke (EP), 2006
- Pretty Little Thieves (LP), 2007. Remastered 2010
