= The Hive (Card and Johnston novel) =

2019 novel by Orson Scott Card and Aaron Johnston

- First edition
- Author: Orson Scott Card and Aaron Johnston
- Cover artist: John Harris
- Language: English
- Series: Ender's Game series
- Genre: Science fiction
- Publisher: Tor Books
- Publication date: June 11, 2019
- Publication place: United States
- Media type: Print (Hardcover)
- Pages: 396 (Hardcover)
- ISBN: 978-0-7653-7564-3
- Preceded by: The Swarm
- Followed by: The Queens

Chart

| Short Stories | Novels | Comics | Audioplay | Film |

First Meetings (in the Enderverse) (2002 (2003)) Ender's Game Investment Counselor The Polish Boy Teacher's Pest
OSCs InterGalactic; Medicine Show (2008) Mazer in Prison Cheater Pretty Boy A Young Man with Prospects
Cheater (2006)
Ender's Shadow (1999) (Note: The events of Ender's Game, Ender's Shadow and A War of Gifts take place in roughly the same time period. The events of A War of Gifts only take place during the time at Battle School).) Ender's Shadow: Battle School (2009) Command School (2010) Ultimate collection (2012)
The Shadow Trilogy (Note: The events of Ender in Exile and the Shadow Trilogy take place in roughly the same time period.: First part of Ender in Exile (2/3) takes place during the Shadow Trilogy.; Last part of Ender in Exile (1/3) takes places after Shadow of the Giant.) (Note: Note on the following (maybe not yet so common) Trilogies: "Speaker Trilogy": Original set of sequels to Ender's Game, also referred to as: "Ender Quartet" (Ender's Game combined with "Speaker Trilogy"), also referred to as: "Ender Quintet" ("Ender Quartet" combined with Ender in Exile).; "Shadow Trilogy": Original set of sequels to Ender's Shadow, also referred to as: "Bean Quartet"/"Shadow Quartet" (Ender's Shadow combined with "Shadow Trilogy"), also referred to as: "Bean Quintet"/"Shadow Quintet" ("Bean Quartet" combined with Shadows in Flight), could be referred to as: "Bean Sextet"/"Shadow Sextet" ("Bean Quintet" combined with The Last Shadow)) Shadow of the Hegemon (2001) Shadow Puppets (2002) Shadow of the Giant (2005)
Shadows in Flight (2012)
Messenger (2018)
The Last Shadow (2021)

Formic Wars: Burning Earth (2011) Formic Wars: Silent Strike (2012) | First Formic; War Trilogy Earth Unaware (2012) Earth Afire (2013) Earth Awakens (2014)
Second Formic; War Trilogy The Swarm (2016) The Hive (2019) The Queens (TBA)
Mazer in Prison (2005) | Mazer in Prison (2010)
Pretty Boy (2006)
Ender's Game; Alive (2013) Recruiting Valentine (2009) The League War (2010) | Ender's Game (1977) Ender's Game (1985) Ender's Game: Battle School (2009) Command School (2010) Ultimate collection (2012) Ender's Game (2013)
Ender's Homecoming (2008) A Young Man with Prospects (2007) Ender in Flight (2008) The Gold Bug (2007) | Ender in Exile (2008) Ender in Exile (2011) Gold Bug (2010)
Governor Wiggin (2017)
Investment Counselor (1999)
Speaker for the Dead (2011) Gloriously Bright (1991) | The Speaker Trilogy Speaker for the Dead (1986) Xenocide (1991) Children of the Mind (1996)

War of Gifts (2010) Mazer in Prison Recruiting Valentine The League War War of Gifts
The Polish Boy (2002)
Teacher's Pest (2003)
Ender's Stocking (2007) A War of Gifts (2007) War of Gifts (2009)
Fleet School (Note: Title is also mentioned in regard to a possible sequel for the film.) Children of the Fleet (2017)... (TBC)
Renegat (2017)

The Hive is a 2019 science fiction novel by American writers Orson Scott Card and Aaron Johnston, and the second book of the Second Formic Wars trilogy of novels in the Ender's Game series. It was released on June 11, 2019. It is the sequel to The Swarm and will be followed by a novel titled The Queens.

== Plot ==
In The Swarm, the Formic's initial efforts to eradicate Earth life forms were beaten back by a coalition of corporate and international military forces, and the Chinese army, with notable efforts by Bingwen, Mazer Rackham, Victor Delgado and Lem Jukes. The devastation of China associated with this led to the reorganization of Earth's government for defense of the human species. In The Hive, the series' main characters face the forces of nationalism, tribalism, paranoia, egotism, jealousy, and self-aggrandizement that threaten to tear apart Earth's new defense forces from within. Meanwhile, they must battle the ever growing forces of the Formics and attempt to locate and destroy the Hive Queen.

== See also ==
- List of Ender's Game characters
- Orson Scott Card bibliography
