= Hive UI =

Custom ROM for the Android operating system

HIVE
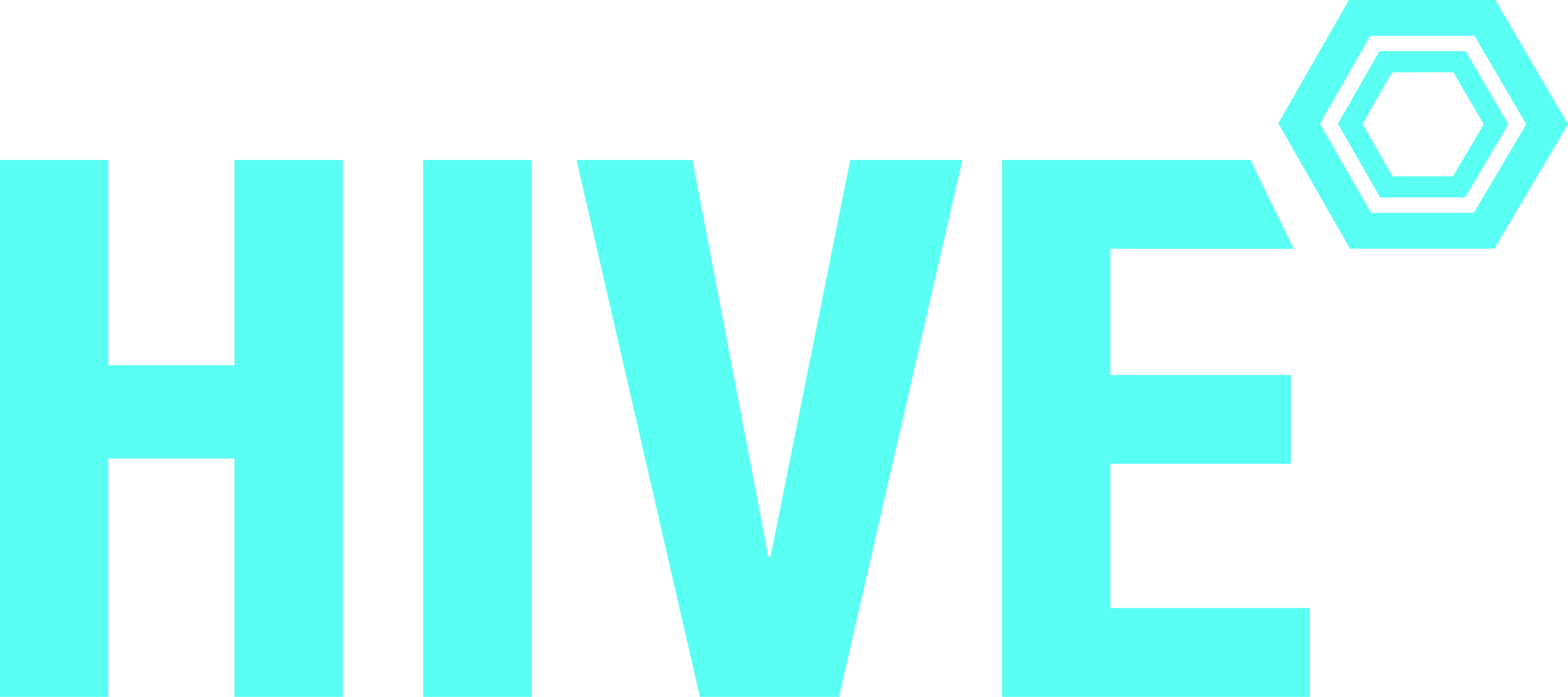
- Developer: Xolo
- Operating system: Android
- Type: Graphical user interface
- License: proprietary
- Website: www.hiveinside.com

Hive (stylized as HIVE) is a custom ROM developed by Xolo and is built on the Android operating system v 4.4.4 (KitKat). Hive is exclusive to Xolo devices and is not licensed to third-parties.

Hive was designed by Xolo's software design team at Bangalore. Users can interact with the development team and share ideas for new features. The Hive Development Team aims to release over-the-air updates with new features or bug fixes every fortnight.

The first Xolo device (8X-1000) with Hive was launched in August 2014.

== Smartphones running Hive UI ==
- Xolo 8X-1000
- Xolo Omega 5.0
- Xolo Omega 5.5
- Xolo Black
- Xolo Black 1X

== See also ==
- List of custom Android firmware
