= Apache Beehive =

Java application development framework

- Developer: Apache Software Foundation
- Final release: 1.0.2 / December 4, 2006; 19 years ago
- Written in: Java
- Operating system: Cross-platform
- Type: Java Application Framework
- License: Apache License 2.0
- Website: beehive.apache.org
- Repository: svn.apache.org/repos/asf/beehive/trunk/

Apache Beehive is a discontinued Java Application Framework that was designed to simplify the development of Java EE-based applications. It makes use of various open-source projects at Apache, such as XMLBeans. Apache Beehive uses Java 5, including JSR-175, a facility for annotating fields, methods, and classes so that they can be treated in special ways by runtime tools. It builds on the framework developed for BEA Systems WebLogic Workshop for its 8.1 series. BEA later decided to donate the code to Apache.

== History ==
Version 8.1 of BEA's WebLogic Workshop includes several improvements over version 7.0. The previous version focused on creating web services quickly, but saw low adoption. For version 8.1, BEA created a new Integrated Development Environment (IDE) designed to streamline Java EE application development. Version 8.1 received several industry awards for its design updates over Version 7.0.

Following the release of Workshop 8.1, the underlying WebLogic Workshop Framework was ported to work with other Java EE-based application servers when BEA decided to open-source the project under the purview of the Apache Software Foundation. In order for it to be used with other Java EE-based application servers, BEA decided to open-source the project under the purview of the Apache Software Foundation. The latest version of Beehive was released on December 4, 2006, and retired to Apache Attic in January 2010.

== Beehive components ==
=== Netui Page Flows ===
This is an application framework built on top of Apache Struts designed to automate the updating of Struts configuration files.

=== Controls ===
Controls are the core of the Beehive framework. A control can be defined as a program that can be used by the developer to access enterprise-level resources, such as Enterprise Java Beans (EJBs), web services etc. For example, consider accessing an old legacy EJB 2 bean. It involved a lot of routine code like getting access to a home interface, creating/finding an EJB using finder methods, and then accessing the remote methods of the bean. Using a control simplifies this process by handling most of the routine coding for the developer, letting them work on business logic rather than the inner-details of Java EE technology. Controls are also useful to advanced developers, allowing them to concentrate on things like constructing a Facade to a complex set of application APIs. In essence, a control to a legacy EJB 2 been ensured that the developer could simply use the control and call any business method of the EJB, using it in the same way as any other Java class. When EJB 3 came around, such simplification was already provided by the EJB specification itself, And Beehive controls were of little further use here. The Controls come with a standard set of controls wiz EJB Control, Web service Control, Database Control and JMS Control. Custom controls can also be developed, which in turn could make use of the controls already built-in.

=== Web services ===
This third component of Beehive enables a developer to create web services using meta-data/annotations. By using meta-data/annotations one can create complex web services utilizing features like conversation, state etc. This approach consolidates metadata and annotations into a single source file. Using this approach, any plain Java class can be converted into a web service just by the addition of annotations into the Java source files. This is based on JSR-181 which builds on JSR-175.

== Bibliography ==
- Mittal, Kunal; Kanchanavally, Srinivas (August 15, 2005), Pro Apache Beehive (1st ed.), Apress, p. 240, ISBN 978-1-59059-515-2, archived from the original on January 2, 2010
