= Beehive Peak =

Summit in Madison County, Montana, United States

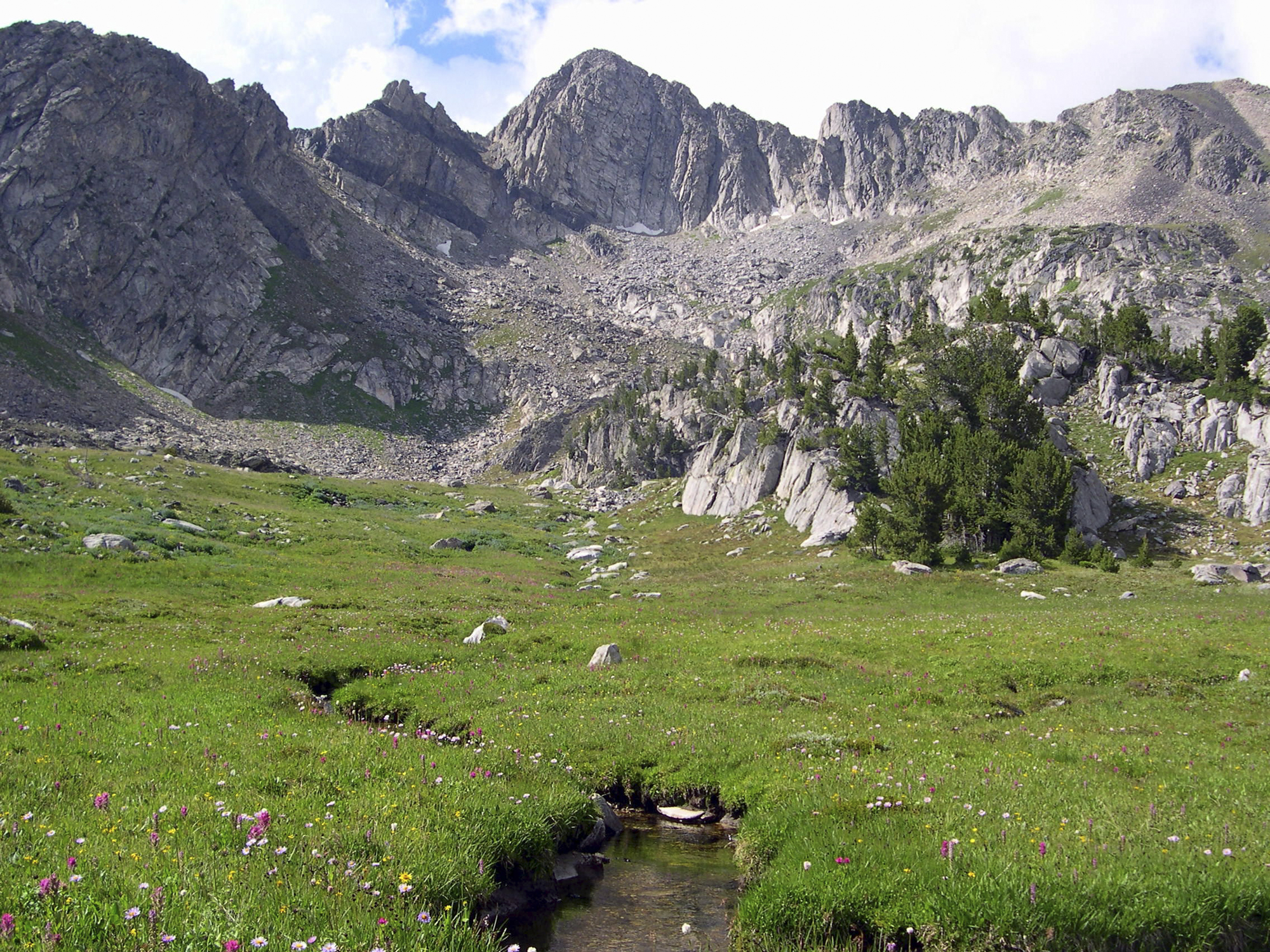
- South aspect, from Beehive Basin

Highest point
- Elevation: 10,740 ft (3,274 m)
- Prominence: 1,040 ft (320 m)
- Parent peak: Gallatin Peak (11,015 ft)
- Isolation: 2.17 mi (3.49 km)
- Coordinates: 45°21′14″N 111°24′20″W

Geography
- Location within Montana Location within the United States
- Country: United States
- State: Montana
- County: Madison County
- Protected area: Lee Metcalf Wilderness
- Parent range: Rocky Mountains; Madison Range; Spanish Peaks
- Topo map: USGS Lone Mountain

Climbing
- Easiest route: class 4 scrambling

Beehive Peak is a 10,740-foot (3,274-metre) summit located in Madison County, Montana, United States.

== Description ==
Beehive Peak is the second-highest peak in the Spanish Peaks which is a subrange of the Madison Range. It is situated eight miles (13 km) north-northwest of Big Sky, Montana, and 25 miles (40 km) southwest of Bozeman. The peak is set within the Lee Metcalf Wilderness on land managed by Gallatin National Forest. Precipitation runoff from the mountain drains into tributaries of the Gallatin River. Topographic relief is significant as the summit rises 2,000 feet (610 meters) above South Fork Spanish Creek in one mile (1.6 km).

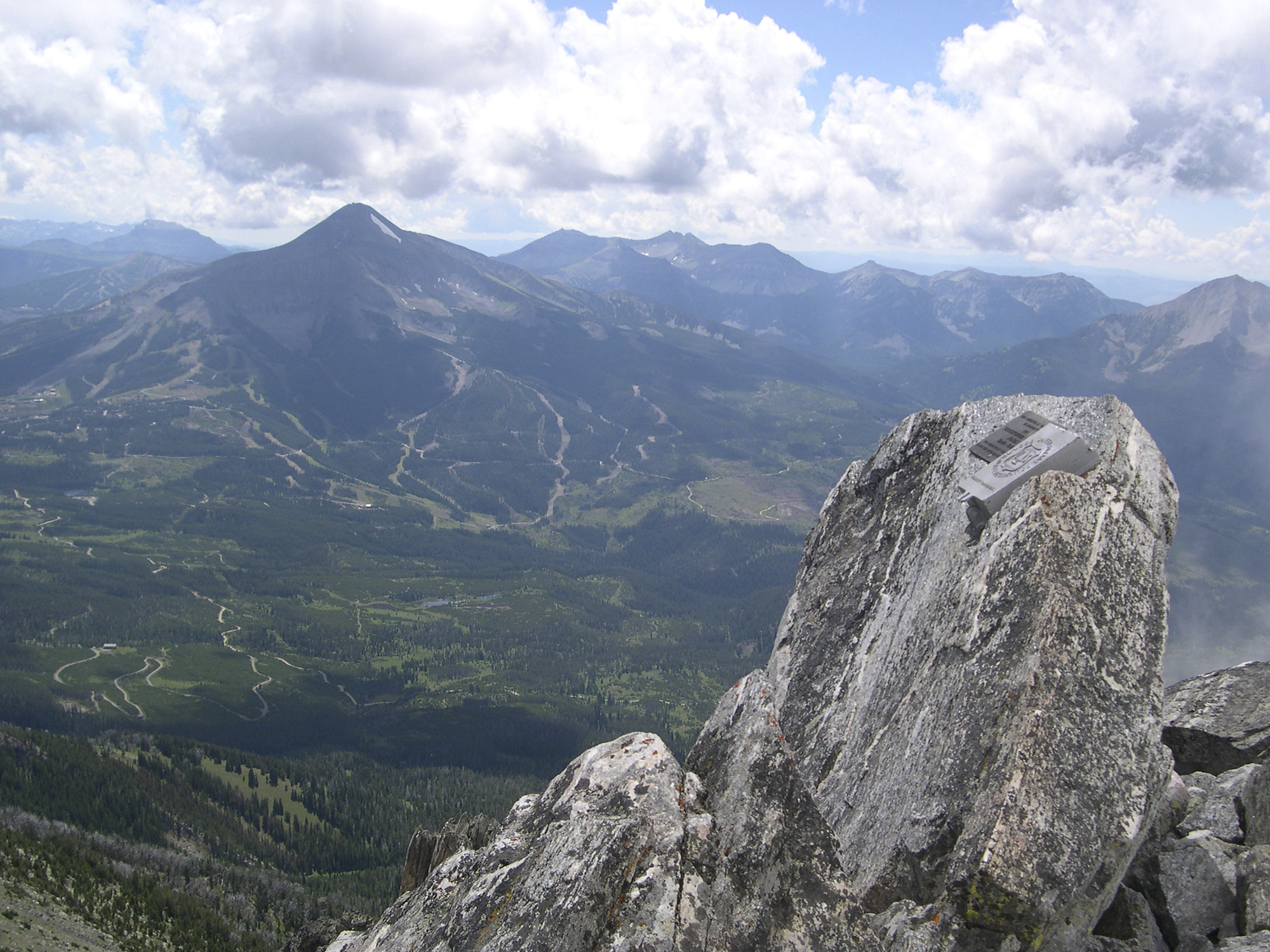
View from summit. (Note plaque)

== Climate ==
Based on the Köppen climate classification, Beehive Peak is located in a subarctic climate zone characterized by long, usually very cold winters, and short, cool to mild summers. Winter temperatures can drop below −10 °F with wind chill factors below −30 °F.

== Etymology ==
This mountain's toponym has not been officially adopted by the United States Board on Geographic Names, so it is not labelled on USGS maps, and will remain unofficial as long as the USGS policy of not adopting new toponyms in designated wilderness areas remains in effect. The peak is named in association with Beehive Lake and Beehive Basin which are both below the peak, and are both officially named.

== Climbing ==
The first recorded ascent of the summit was made in the early 1950s by Dave Wessel. The summit can be accessed via the class 4 southwest couloir following a 5.5-mile hike and 2,842 feet of elevation gain. A plaque on the summit is placed in memory of Kit Jones, who was killed while climbing in 1965 in the Mission Mountains. Beehive Peak was Jones’ first summit and the climb that hooked him on mountaineering.

== See also ==
- Geology of the Rocky Mountains
- Mountains of Madison County, Montana
