= The Hive (2008 film) =

- DVD cover
- Written by: T. S. Cook
- Directed by: Peter Manus
- Starring: Tom Wopat; Kal Weber; Elizabeth Healey
- Music by: Charles Olins; Mark Ryder
- Country of origin: United States
- Original language: English

Production
- Producer: Charles Salmon
- Cinematography: Kittiwat Saemarat
- Editor: Laurie McDowell
- Running time: 90 minutes
- Production company: Thai Occidental Productions

Original release
- Network: Syfy
- Release: February 17, 2008

The Hive is an American 2008 science fiction made-for-television film set in Thailand, directed by Peter Manus and written by T. S. Cook. Starring Tom Wopat, Kal Weber and Mark Ramsey, the film follows a group of scientists who must stop a swarm of man-eating ants feeding on the population, but eventually discover that something was controlling the ants. It is the eighth film in the Maneater film series, it premiered on the Syfy channel on February 17, 2008. The film was released to DVD on August 5, 2008.

== Plot ==
A large swarm of ants arrives on Earth one night, terrorizing many cities and towns. A group of scientists must work together to stop the ants before it is too late.

== Cast ==
- Tom Wopat as Bill
- Kal Weber as Dr. Horace "Len" Lennart
- Elizabeth Healey as Claire Dubois
- Mark Ramsey as Cortez
- Jessica Reavis as Debs
- Elizabeth Bodner as Ying
- Pisek Intarakanchit as Chang
- Nicky Tamrong as Minister Zhing
- Dorrie Salmon as Baby
- Sujinthara Phumjan as Young Mother
